= Province of Valladolid =

Province of Castile and León, Spain

Province of Valladolid Provincia de Valladolid (Spanish)
- Province
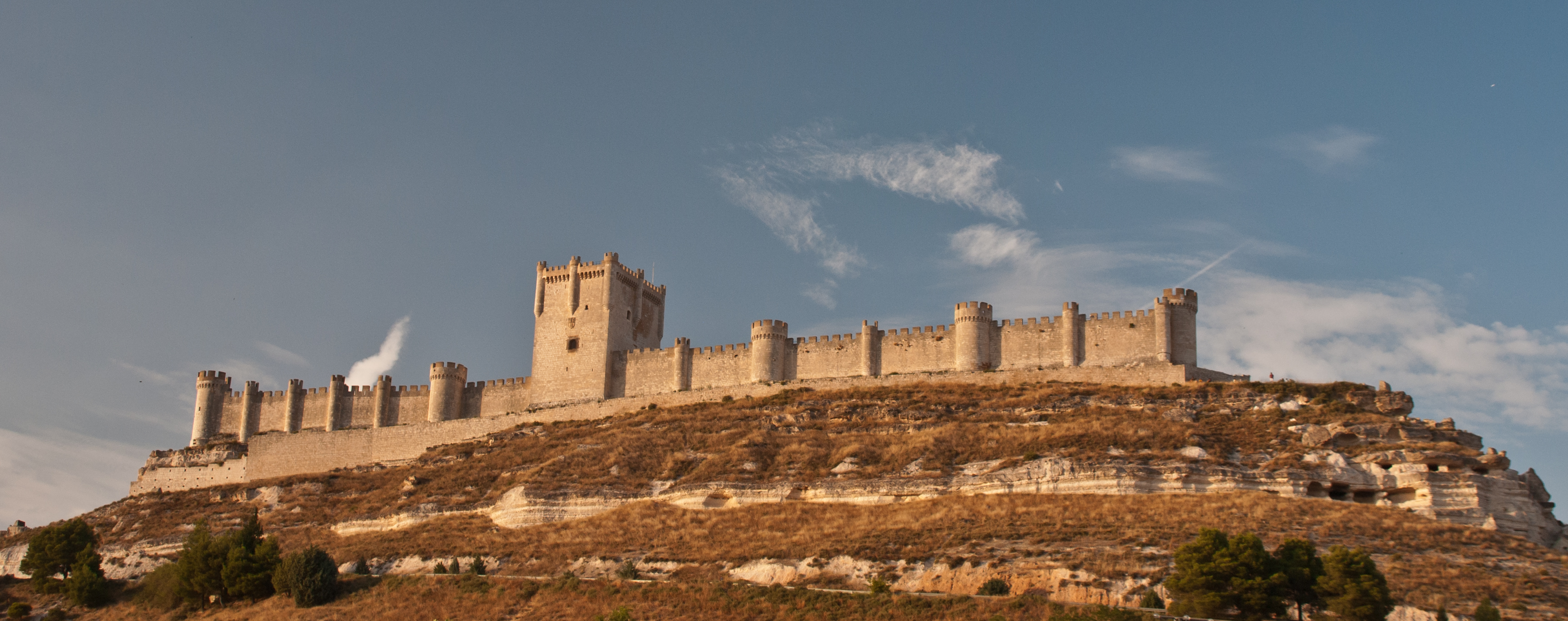
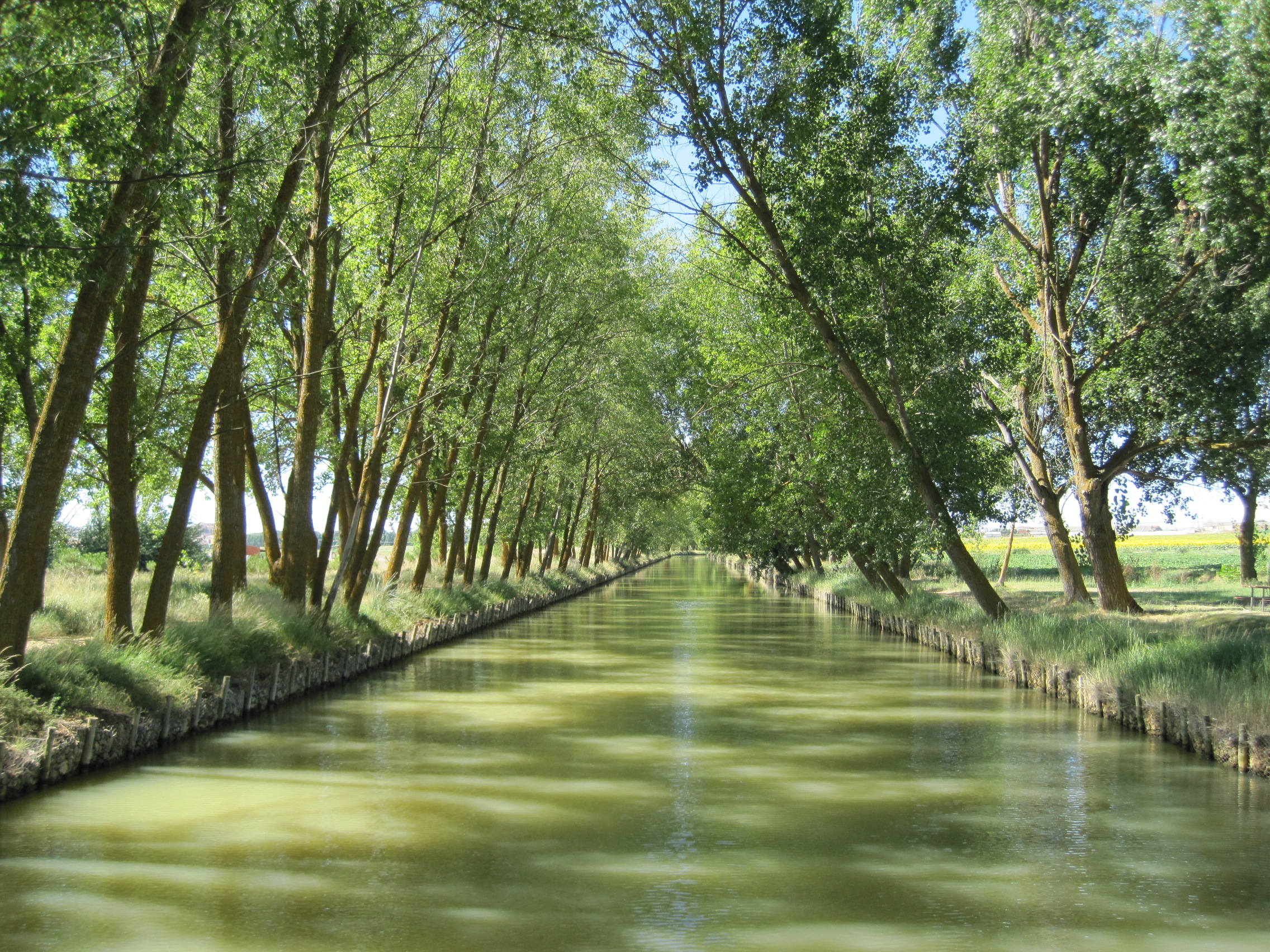
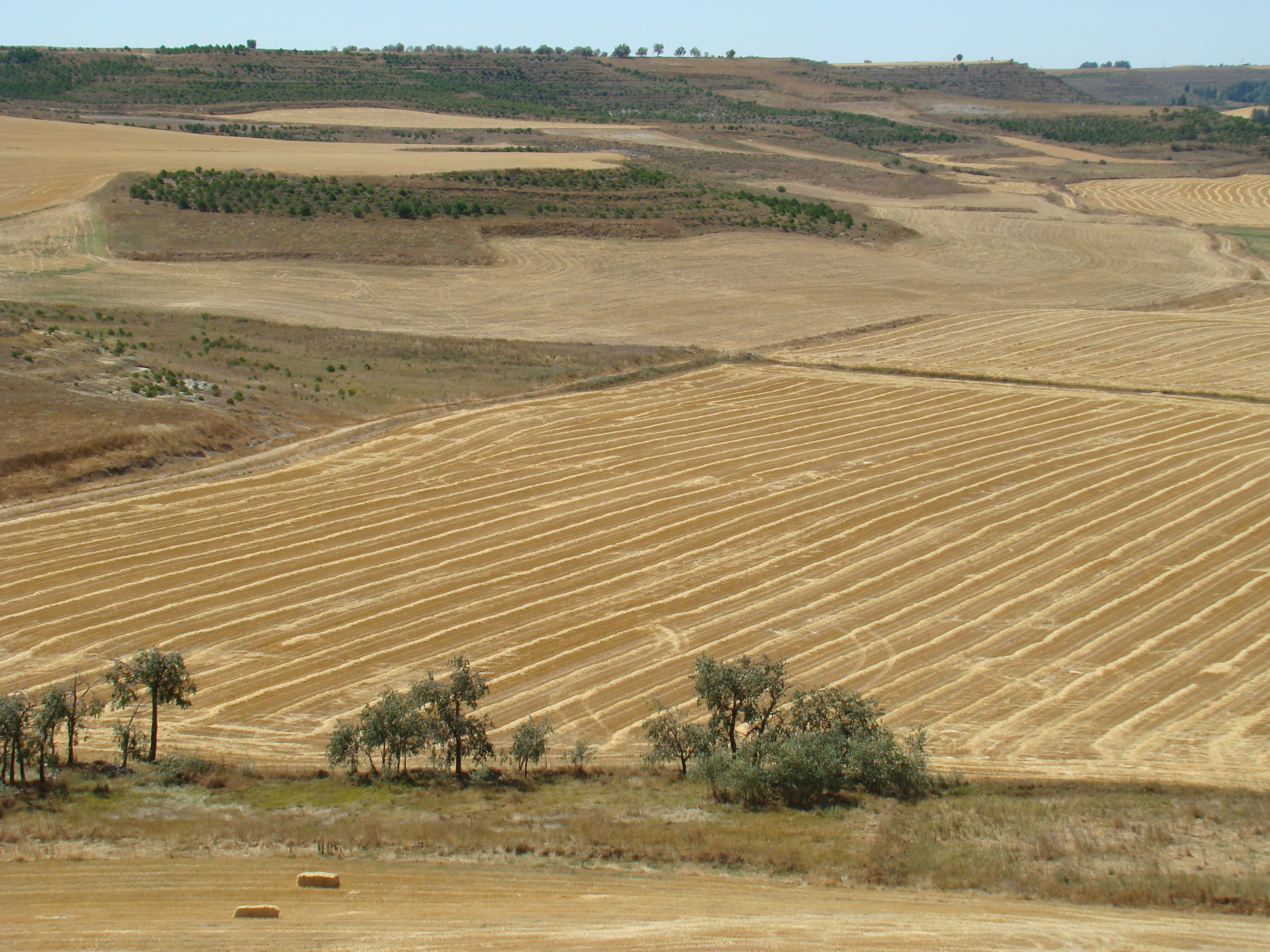
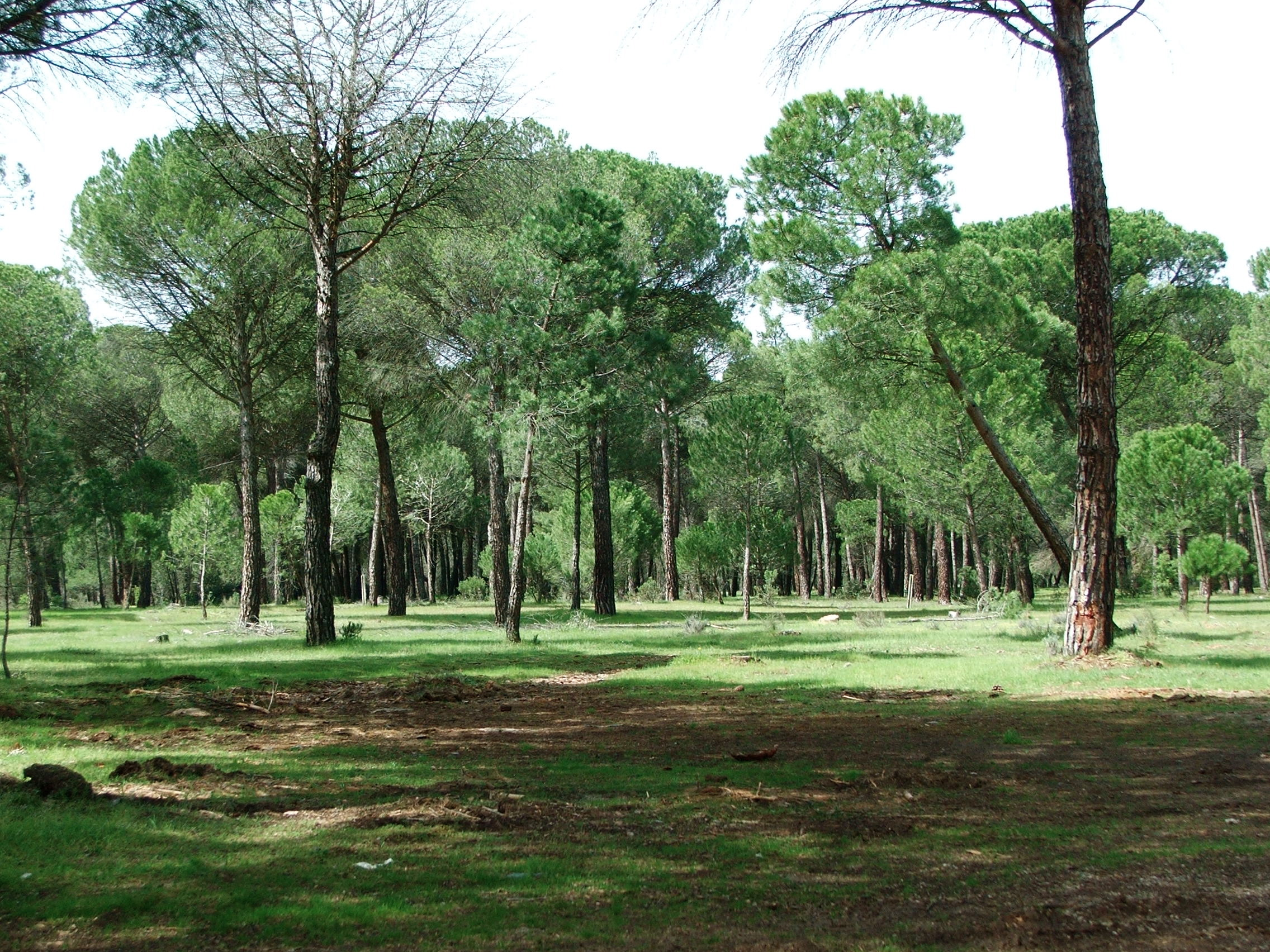
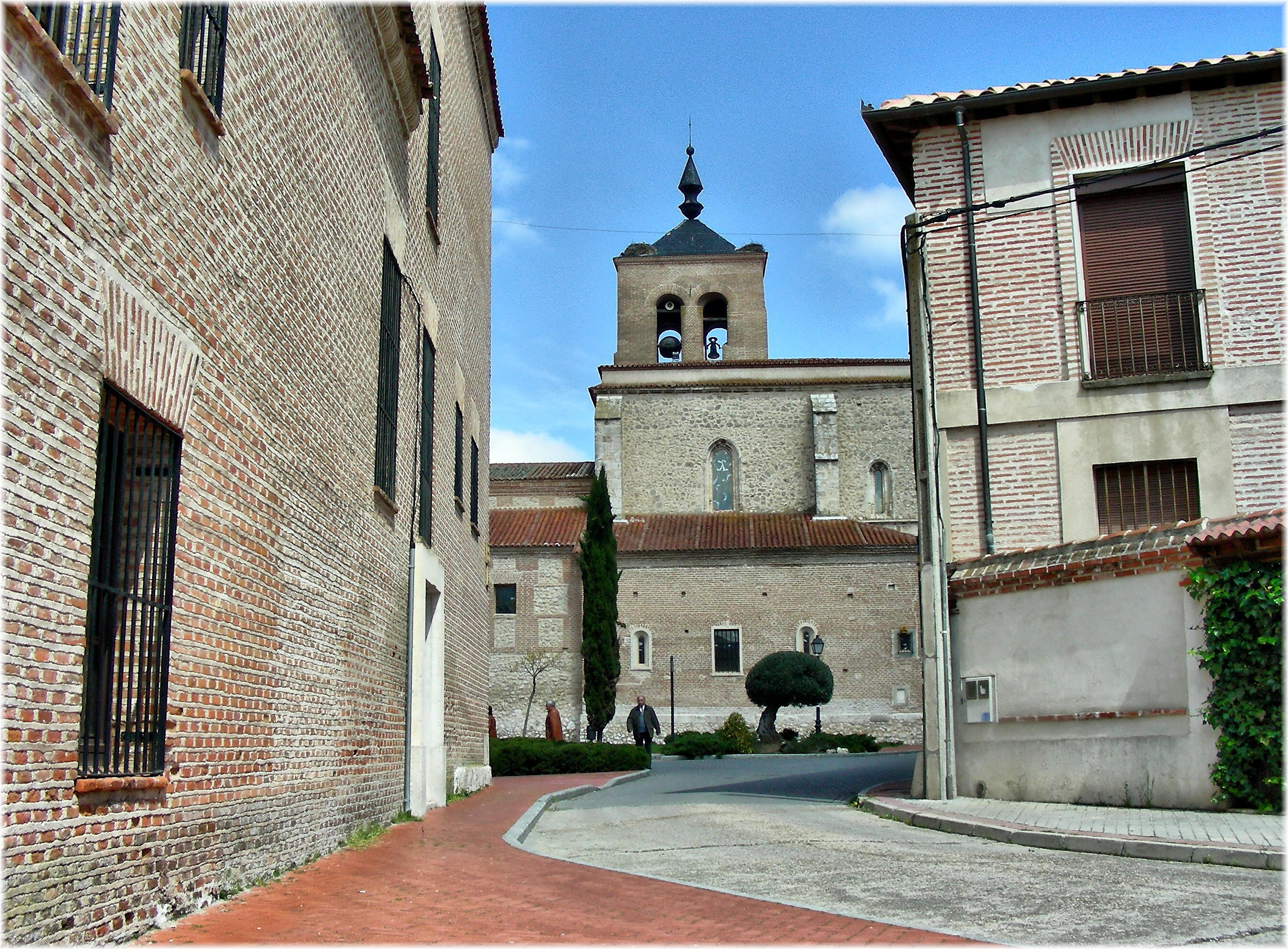
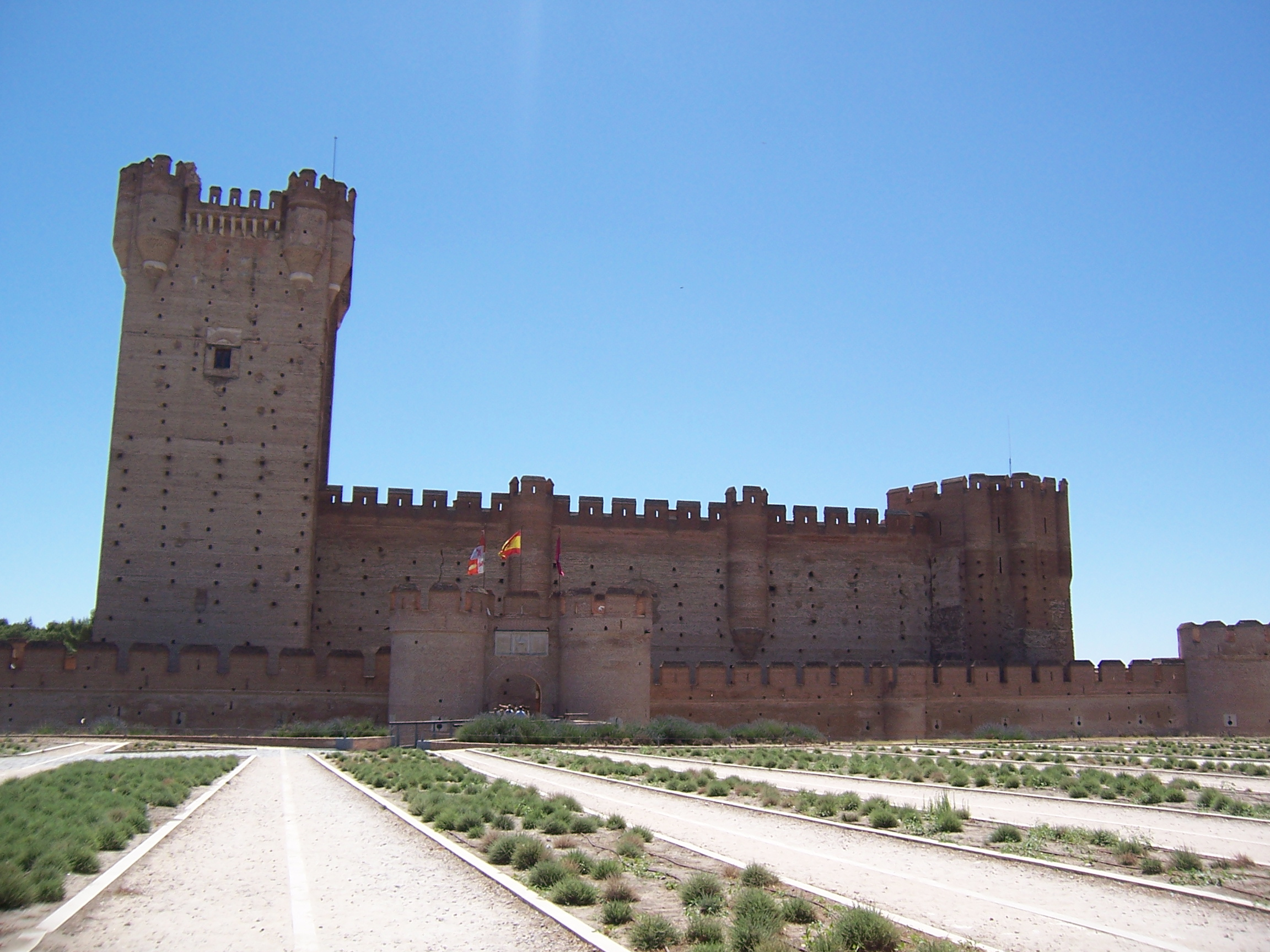
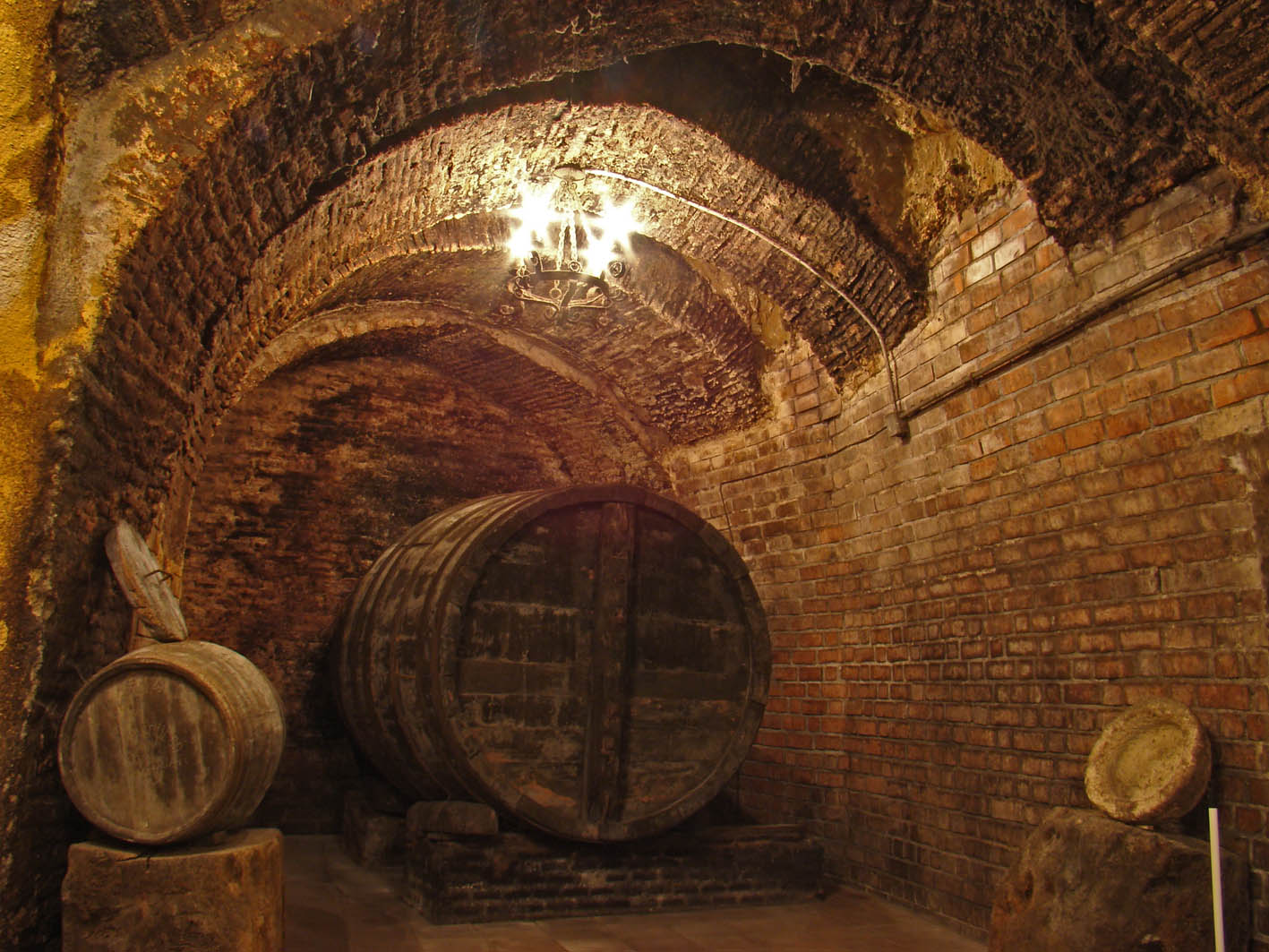
- From top to bottom and from left to right: The Castle of Peñafiel, Canal of Castile, typical landscape of the province, a pine forest, centre of a Castilian town, Castle of La Mota and a wine cellar.

- Flag Coat of arms

- Location of the Province of Valladolid in Spain
- Interactive map of Province of Valladolid
- Coordinates: 41°35′N 4°40′W
- Country: Spain
- Autonomous community: Castile and León
- Capital: Valladolid

Area
  - Total: 8,110.51 km^{2} (3,131.49 sq mi)
  - Rank: 28th in Spain
- 1.6% of Spain

Population (2025)
  - Total: 528,644
  - Rank: 30th in Spain
  - Density: 65.1801/km^{2} (168.816/sq mi)
- 1.1% of Spain
- Demonym: Spanish: Vallisoletano/a
- ISO 3166 code: ES-VA
- Official language(s): Spanish
- Parliament: Cortes Generales
- Website: diputaciondevalladolid.es

The Province of Valladolid (/ˌvælədəˈlɪd/ VAL-ə-də-LID; Spanish: [baʎaðoˈlið]) is a province of northwestern Spain, in the central part of the autonomous community of Castile and León. It has a population of 528,644 in an area of 8,110.51 km^{2} (3,131.49 sq mi) across its 225 municipalites.

The capital is the city of Valladolid. It is bordered by the provinces of Zamora, León, Palencia, Burgos, Segovia, Ávila, and Salamanca. It is the only Spanish province surrounded entirely by other provinces of the same autonomous community. It is the only peninsular province that has no mountains.

Lying on an extensive plain relevant to overland transport, the province is a major communications hub. Nationally, it connects Madrid with the north of Spain, from Vigo in Galicia to San Sebastián in the Basque Country; internationally, it is on the shortest land route connecting Porto in the north of Portugal with Hendaye in the south of France.

The cuisine of the province is similar to that of the rest of Castile, with meats and roasts occupying a central place. One of the most typical dishes is lechazo, a dish made from unweaned lambs (similar to veal). Suckling pig, black pudding, sausages, sheep's milk cheeses, and breads are also traditional. The province has five wines with a denomination of origin.

The province once served as the capital of the Castilian court and the former capital of the Spanish Empire during the reigns of Emperors Carlos I, Philip II and Philip III, with many castles and strongholds from that time remaining to this day. The capital has an important historical and artistic heritage and is home to one of the more important sculpture museums in Europe. The province of Valladolid is particularly noted for its Holy Week processions, both in the capital and in the localities of Medina de Rioseco and Medina del Campo. In addition, the province includes two sites listed in the UNESCO Memory of the World Programme: the Treaty of Tordesillas and the Archivo General de Simancas.

== History ==
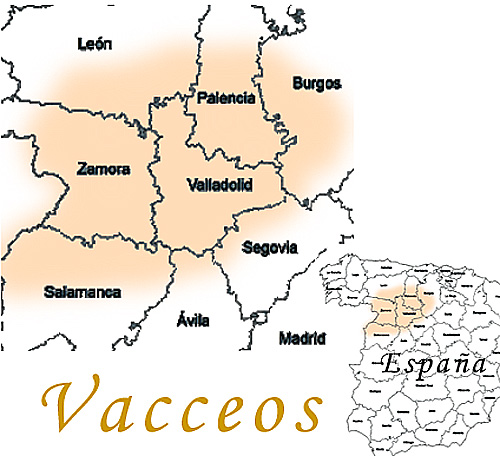
Map of the territory of the Vaccaei, the first people with stable presence in the middle valley of the Douro River documented in historical times.

Province of Valladolid in 1590 (Crown of Castile).

The province of Valladolid was established by the Royal Decree of 29 September 1833, promoted by Minister Javier de Burgos; it was attached to the historic region of Old Castile.

The first stable population to settle in the present province were the pre-Roman Vaccaei people (Spanish: vacceos; the area they inhabited is called the "Vaccea Region"). They belonged to a very advanced culture when the other Celtic peoples arrived in the peninsula from northern Europe (there is evidence that they also occupied territories corresponding to other provinces). Chronicles defined the region as "free and open" and "an open country, fields of wheat, deforested land"; the Vacceos engaged in livestock farming and especially agriculture (cereals).

In 178 BC, the Romans conquered the territory. The lands that make up the current province came under their occupation until the barbarian invasions of the early fifth century AD, when the province came under the control of the Visigothic Kingdom.

Following the Muslim invasion of the Iberian Peninsula in 711, Muslims arrived in the area in 712. Later, during the Reconquista, this area was the subject of battles between the Muslims and the Christian Kingdom of León in the first half of the eleventh century. In 939, the Battle of Simancas secured control of the Douro river basin for the Christian kingdoms. Valladolid was founded in 1072 by Count Pedro Ansúrez. From here its history was linked to that of the Crown of Castile. Cities such as Medina del Campo or Valladolid became important Castilian administrative centres and experienced an economic boom (including the mesta and fairs).

The province was of great importance in the Discovery of the Americas in 1492; Christopher Columbus spent the last years of his life in Valladolid until his death in 1506. It played a role in the subsequent colonization with explorers such as Juan Ponce de León, discoverer of Florida (United States). The Treaty of Tordesillas, which decided the partition of the New World between the Catholic Monarchs and the Kingdom of Portugal and shaped Latin America, was signed in Tordesillas.

The Revolt of the Comuneros occurred in 1520 and ended with the ringleaders publicly executed in Villalar de los Comuneros. Valladolid became the capital of the Spanish Empire between 1601 and 1606. When the Empire began to decline due to continued wars and the emergence of new powers, there was an economic decline in the area, as in the rest of the Spanish monarchy. During the War of the Spanish Succession (1700–1715), the province sided with the Bourbon pretender, who eventually secured the throne. In the Peninsular War against France (1808–1814), a succession of small battles occurred, led by guerrilla fighters such as "The Undaunted".

In the Spanish Civil War (1936–1939), Valladolid was the "most significant regional nucleus" of Falangism in the Spanish Second Republic, garnering the second-highest provincial vote for the party in the otherwise dismal (for Falangists) elections of 1936, just behind Cádiz. The province was controlled by Franco's Nationalists throughout the Civil War. During the Franco period there was an exodus from the rural countryside to the industrial cities. A further exodus occurred with the arrival of democracy in Spain (early 1980s), when the province was made part of the new autonomous community of Castile and León.

A process of economic growth began that peaked with the Spanish property bubble and then suffered from the economic crisis of 2008–2015, similar to the rest of southern Europe. Subsequently, there was some economic growth until 2020, when the COVID-19 pandemic caused the declaration of a state of alarm throughout Spain, resulting in a strong economic standstill. After the lifting of lockdown measures, economic activity reactivated.

== Geography ==
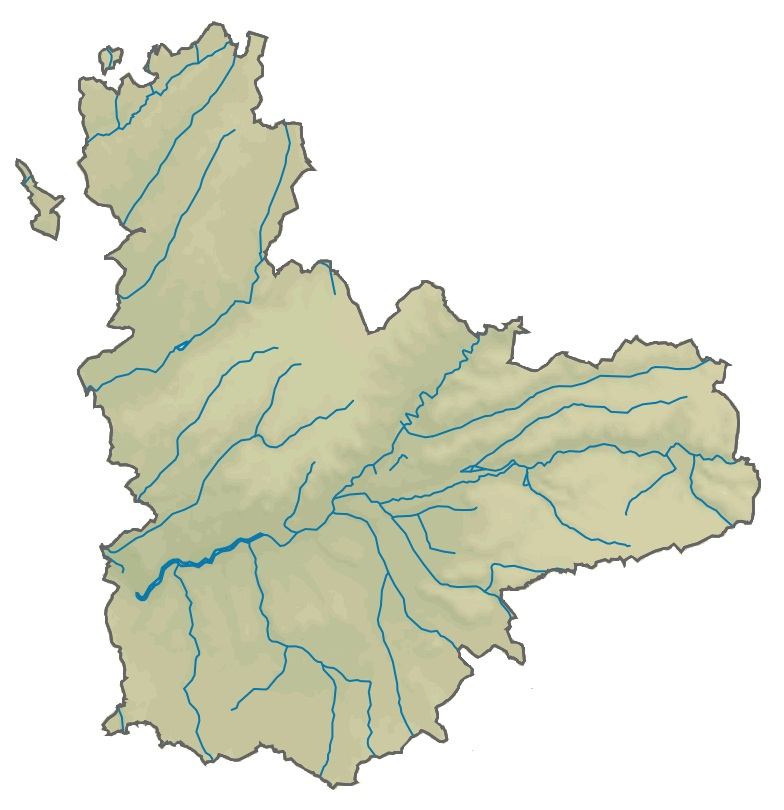
Map of the provincial relief, showing that the province is flat, without significant elevations.

It is bordered by the provinces of Burgos, Palencia and León to the north; Zamora to the west; Salamanca and Ávila to the south; and Segovia to the east. It is the only Spanish province surrounded entirely by others in the same autonomous community (Castile and León).

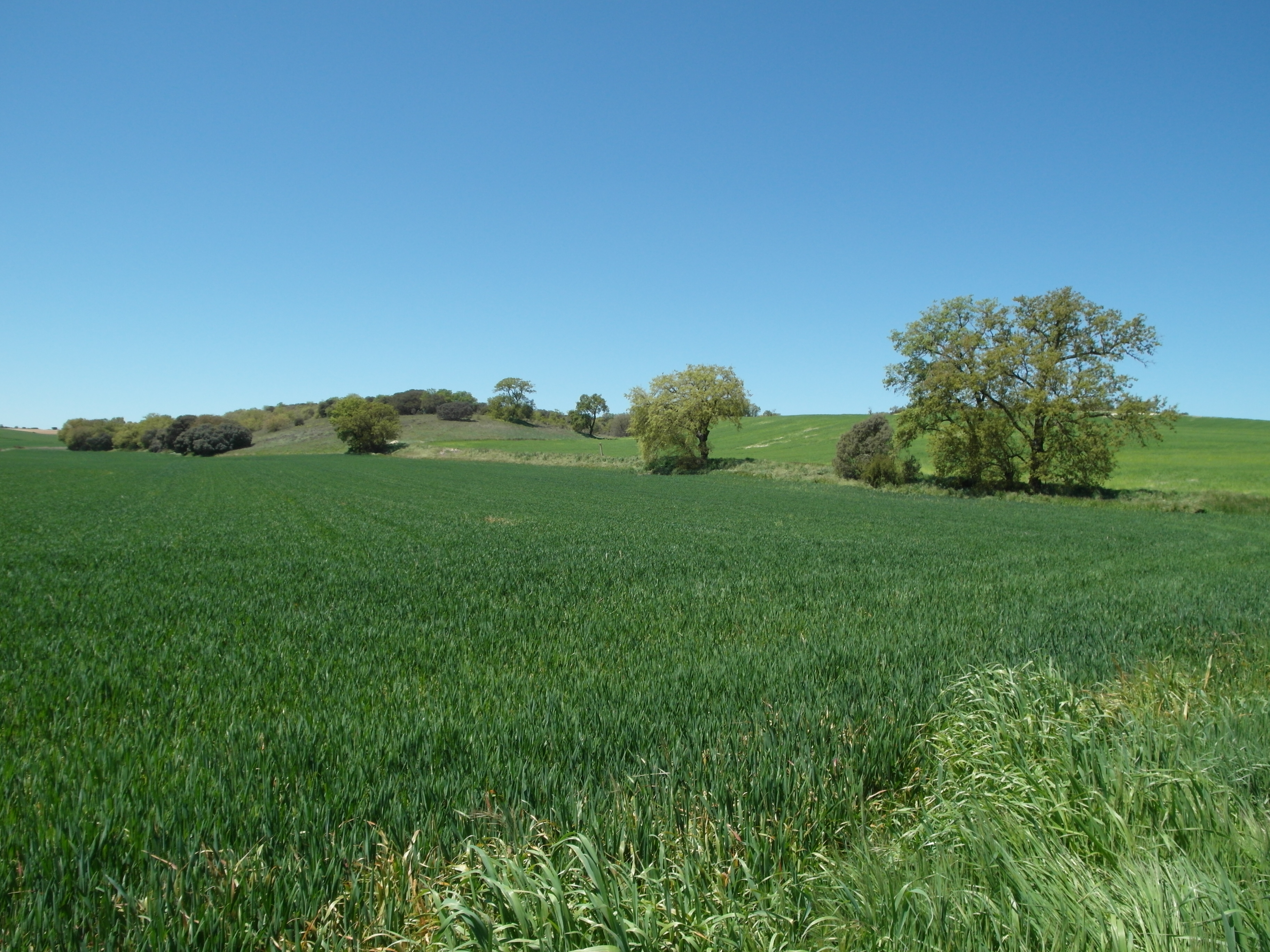
Montes Torozos in spring.

The province of Valladolid covers an area of 8,110 km^{2} (3,130 sq mi). It is located in the centre of the Meseta Central, a plateau in the middle of the northern half of the Iberian Peninsula, and is characterized by its uniform terrain (777 metres on average with a maximum difference in altitude of 300 metres), making it the most geographically homogeneous province in Spain. The Douro river, which crosses it from east to west, is the backbone of the territory.

It is dominated by an extensive plain in which several areas are distinguished: a moorland area defined by river valleys, some of which stand out in altitude causing a mountainous landscape of isolated hills, such as the Montes Torozos, San Cristobal hill (843 m) and the Sardanedo (854 m); a countryside of rolling hills; and separating them, slopes and deep gorges, such as the Cuesta del Prado, Santovenia, and Cabezón de Pisuerga.

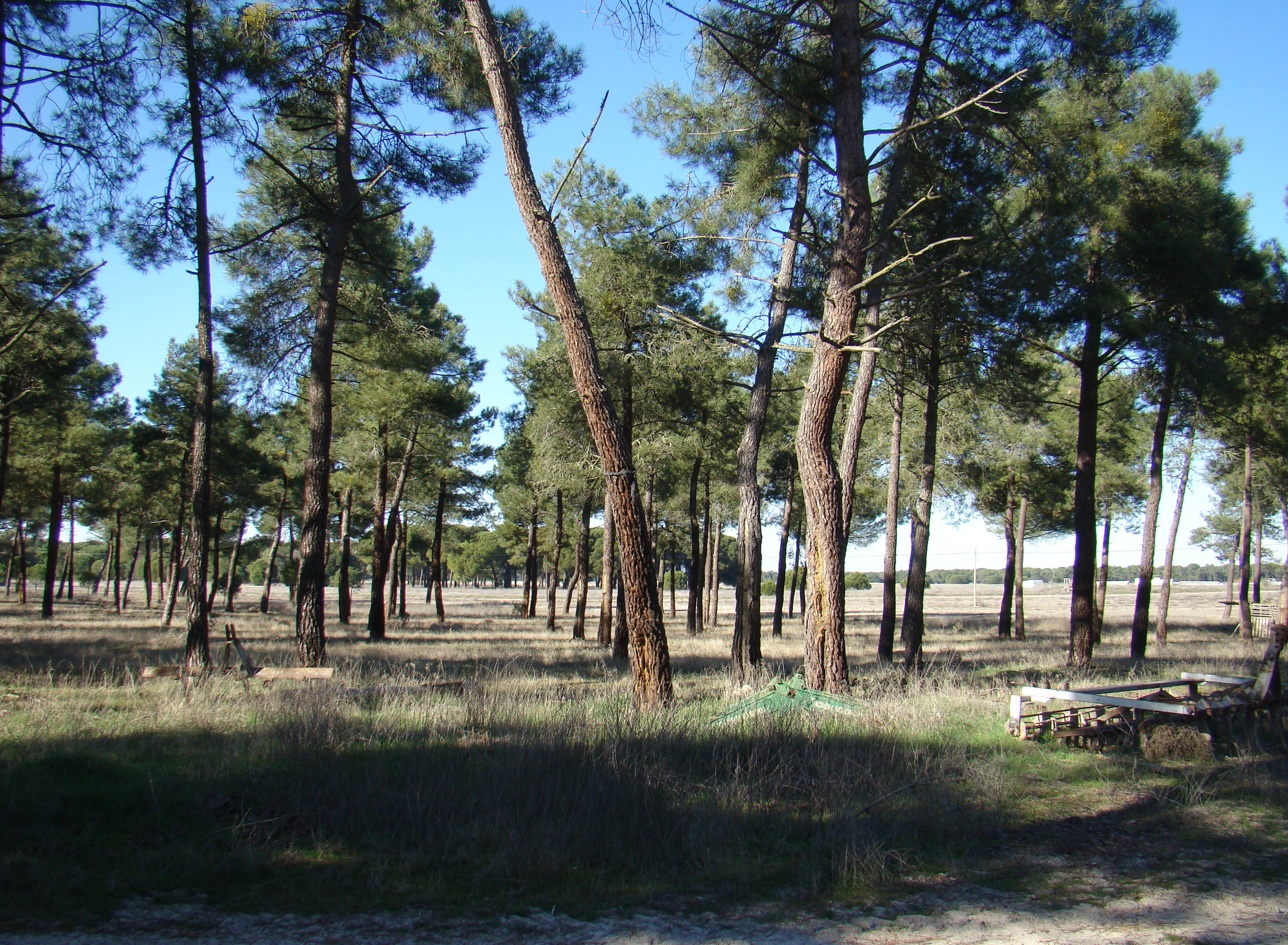
Most of the scarce forests are pine, holm oak and oak.

It is the only peninsular province with absolutely no mountains (it has no coastline either), and—together with the Province of Almería—is the least forested (less than 16% of the territory). The highest point is in Castrillo de Duero at the Cuchillejos hill (933 m). The lowest point is the Douro passing by Villafranca de Duero (626 m). Therefore, it is also the only province of Castile and León that does not reach 1,000 m above sea level at any point in its territory.

The hydrographic network is dominated by the Douro and its tributaries (Pisuerga, Esgueva, Adaja, Eresma, Duratón, Zapardiel and Cega, among others) and completed by the Canal de Castilla and the Canal of Douro. There is only one relevant lake: Laguna de Duero. The province has four reservoirs: Encinas de Esgueva Reservoir, San José, Santa Espina Reservoir and Valdemudarra Reservoir, all built in the 20th century, except for the last one, which was built in the 2000s. Additionally, it features the Villalón pond, the highest-capacity artificial pond in Spain.

=== Climate ===
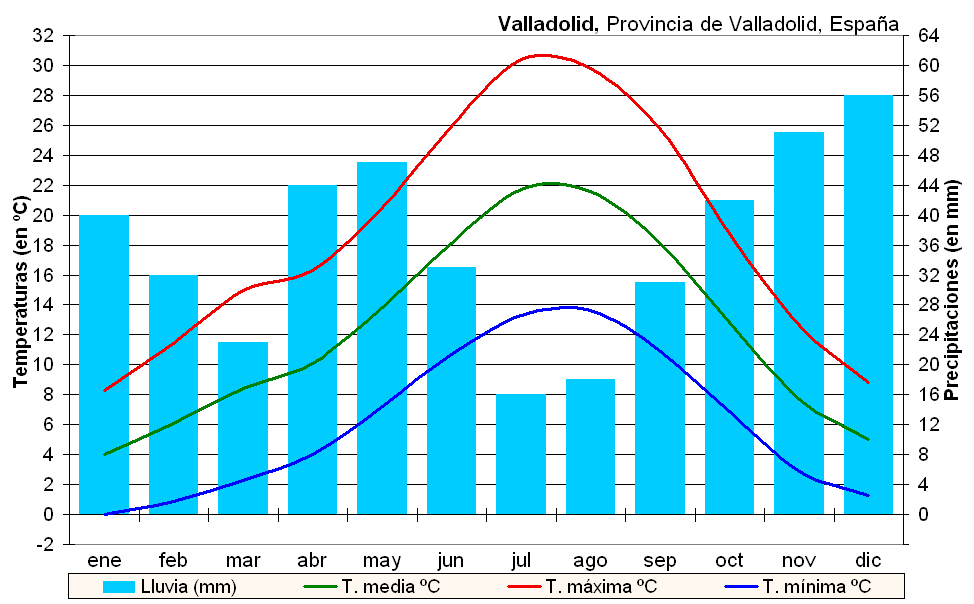
Climograph of Valladolid.

The Continental Mediterranean climate is typical of the Meseta Central where the province of Valladolid is located. It is similar to the typical Mediterranean climate but with characteristics of continental climates, including more extreme temperatures, although it is not different enough to be classified separately. In addition, this climate does not receive the influence of the sea; consequently, temperatures are among the most extreme in Spain, with very hot summers and quite cold winters, with a range of 18.5 °C. According to the Köppen climate classification, the main climate in the province in the 1981–2010 reference period is type Csa (Hot-summer Mediterranean climate) and type Csb (Warm-summer Mediterranean climate).

Summer is the driest season and can frequently exceed 30 °C, reaching sporadically over 35 °C. However, in winter it is frequent for temperatures to fall to 0 °C, producing ice on cloudless nights and snow sporadically. When frost combines with fog, it produces hard rime, a very characteristic phenomenon of the area. This northern region of Spain, along with the rest of the provinces of Castile and León, is the coldest region in Southern Europe.

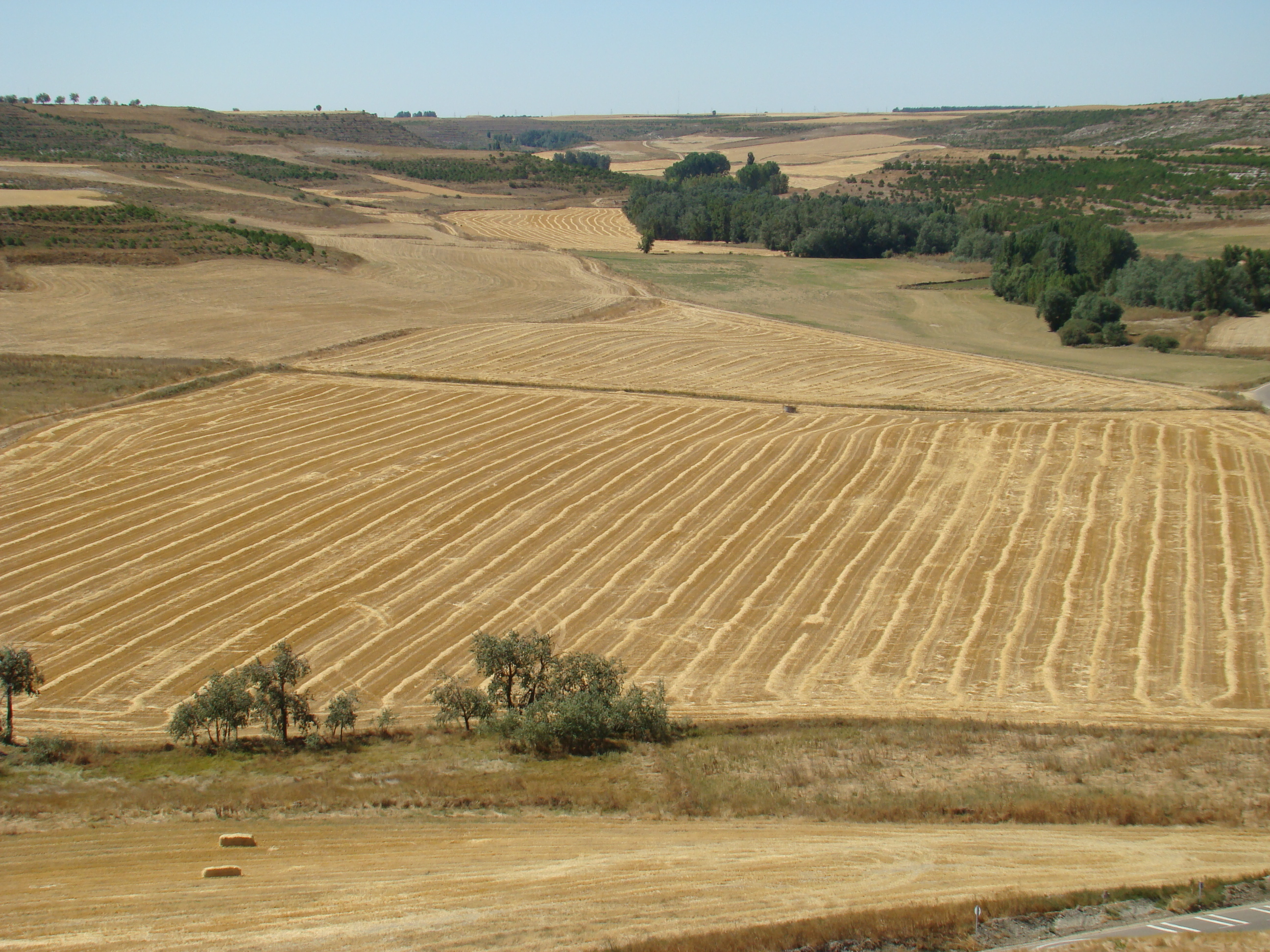
Due to the climate, the predominant crop is dryland farming, which means that the typical provincial landscape is associated with the cereal steppe.

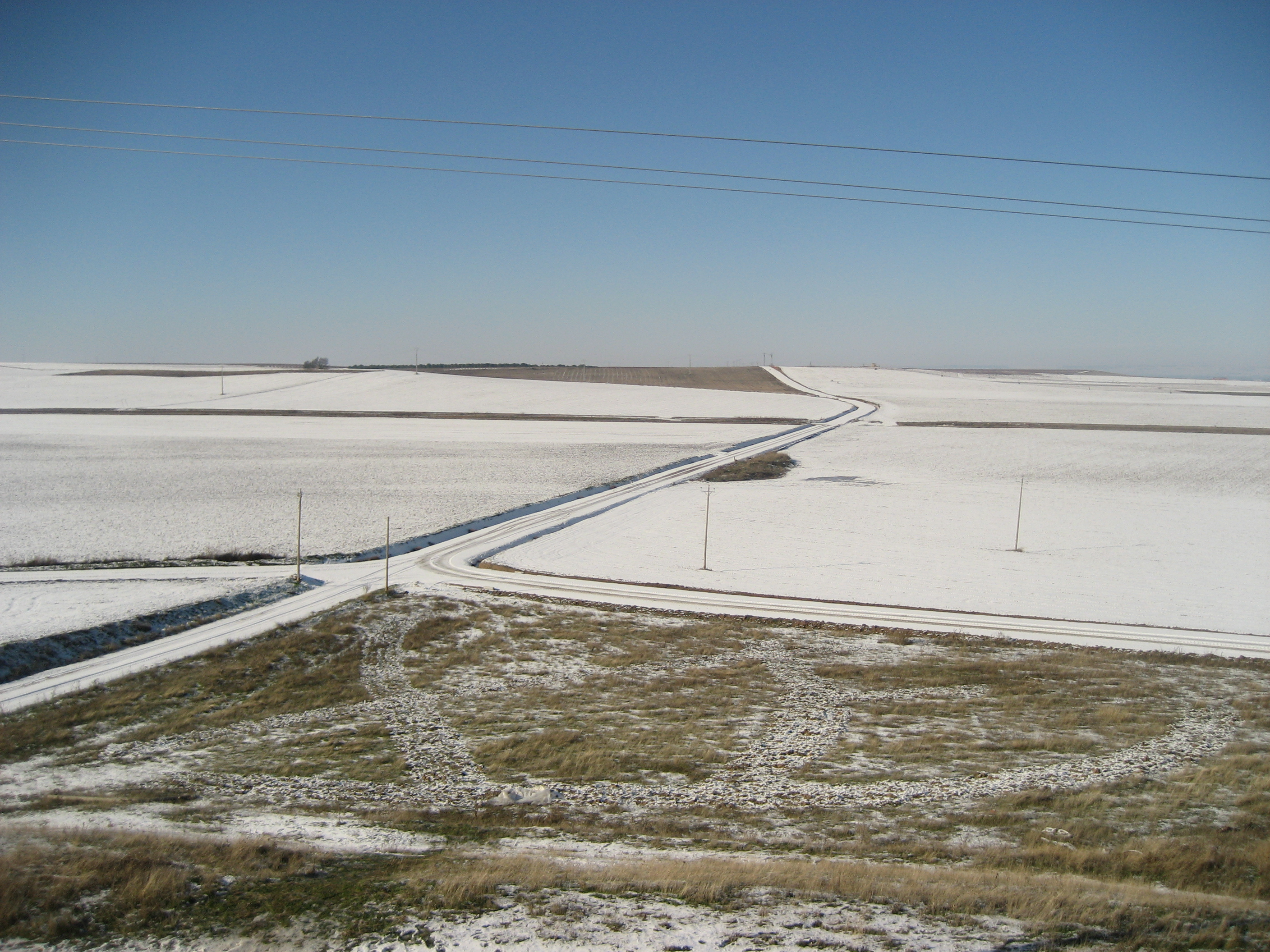
Fields in winter. In this climate the thermal differences between day and night can exceed 20 degrees. Phenomena such as fog, ground frost, and rime ice are common, although snow is less common.

Rainfall follows a very similar pattern to that of the typical Mediterranean climate, reaching between 400 and 600 mm, with a peak during spring and autumn. The declining influence of the sea, however, makes it a drier climate than typical. In the province of Valladolid, the continental Mediterranean climate has temperatures approximately two degrees higher than in other areas with this climate, mainly due to the scarcity of mountains in this province and the altitude, which is between 50 and 200 metres lower on average than in the whole of Castile and León.

Therefore, the province of Valladolid has the most moderate climate of the northern plateau, with an average annual temperature of 11.8 °C. Its average annual rainfall ranges between 400 and 600 millimetres per year, distributed throughout the year with a fairly strong minimum in summer and a very attenuated winter minimum. Rainfall in the province of Valladolid is generally gentle and spread over several days, which favors agriculture.

The extreme weather values recorded at either of the two State Meteorological Agency (AEMet) observatories in the province are 40.2 °C recorded on 19 July 1995, at the Valladolid observatory and -18.8 °C recorded at the Villanubla observatory on 3 January 1971. The strongest wind gust recorded was 133 km/h on 24 January 1971, while the maximum accumulated precipitation in a single day was 90.8 l/m^{2} on 5 December 1951.

Climate data for Valladolid
| Month | Jan | Feb | Mar | Apr | May | Jun | Jul | Aug | Sep | Oct | Nov | Dec | Year |
|---|---|---|---|---|---|---|---|---|---|---|---|---|---|
| Record high °C (°F) | 17.0 (62.6) | 23.6 (74.5) | 24.6 (76.3) | 29.2 (84.6) | 33.0 (91.4) | 37.0 (98.6) | 39.4 (102.9) | 38.6 (101.5) | 37.6 (99.7) | 29.0 (84.2) | 23.2 (73.8) | 19.8 (67.6) | 39.4 (102.9) |
| Mean daily maximum °C (°F) | 7.4 (45.3) | 10.3 (50.5) | 13.4 (56.1) | 14.8 (58.6) | 18.7 (65.7) | 23.9 (75.0) | 28.5 (83.3) | 28.2 (82.8) | 24.2 (75.6) | 17.6 (63.7) | 11.8 (53.2) | 8.1 (46.6) | 17.2 (63.0) |
| Daily mean °C (°F) | 3.1 (37.6) | 5.1 (41.2) | 7.2 (45.0) | 8.7 (47.7) | 12.3 (54.1) | 16.6 (61.9) | 20.1 (68.2) | 20.1 (68.2) | 17.0 (62.6) | 11.8 (53.2) | 6.9 (44.4) | 4.2 (39.6) | 11.1 (52.0) |
| Mean daily minimum °C (°F) | −1.2 (29.8) | −0.1 (31.8) | 1.0 (33.8) | 2.6 (36.7) | 5.8 (42.4) | 9.2 (48.6) | 11.7 (53.1) | 12.0 (53.6) | 9.8 (49.6) | 6.0 (42.8) | 2.1 (35.8) | 0.2 (32.4) | 4.9 (40.8) |
| Record low °C (°F) | −18.8 (−1.8) | −16 (3) | −12.4 (9.7) | −6.5 (20.3) | −5.4 (22.3) | −0.5 (31.1) | 2.4 (36.3) | 2.4 (36.3) | −0.4 (31.3) | −5.6 (21.9) | −9.2 (15.4) | −12.6 (9.3) | −18.8 (−1.8) |
| Average precipitation mm (inches) | 42 (1.7) | 33 (1.3) | 23 (0.9) | 48 (1.9) | 54 (2.1) | 35 (1.4) | 19 (0.7) | 19 (0.7) | 30 (1.2) | 45 (1.8) | 48 (1.9) | 55 (2.2) | 455 (17.9) |
| Average precipitation days (≥ 1.0 mm) | 7 | 6 | 5 | 8 | 9 | 5 | 3 | 3 | 4 | 7 | 7 | 8 | 71 |
| Average relative humidity (%) | 86 | 76 | 66 | 66 | 65 | 58 | 49 | 51 | 58 | 72 | 81 | 87 | 68 |
| Mean monthly sunshine hours | 120 | 155 | 203 | 220 | 264 | 313 | 361 | 340 | 245 | 196 | 136 | 98 | 2,645 |
Source 1: Agencia Estatal de Meteorología (normals 1971–2000)
Source 2: Agencia Estatal de Meteorología (extremes only 1938–2012)

=== Nature ===
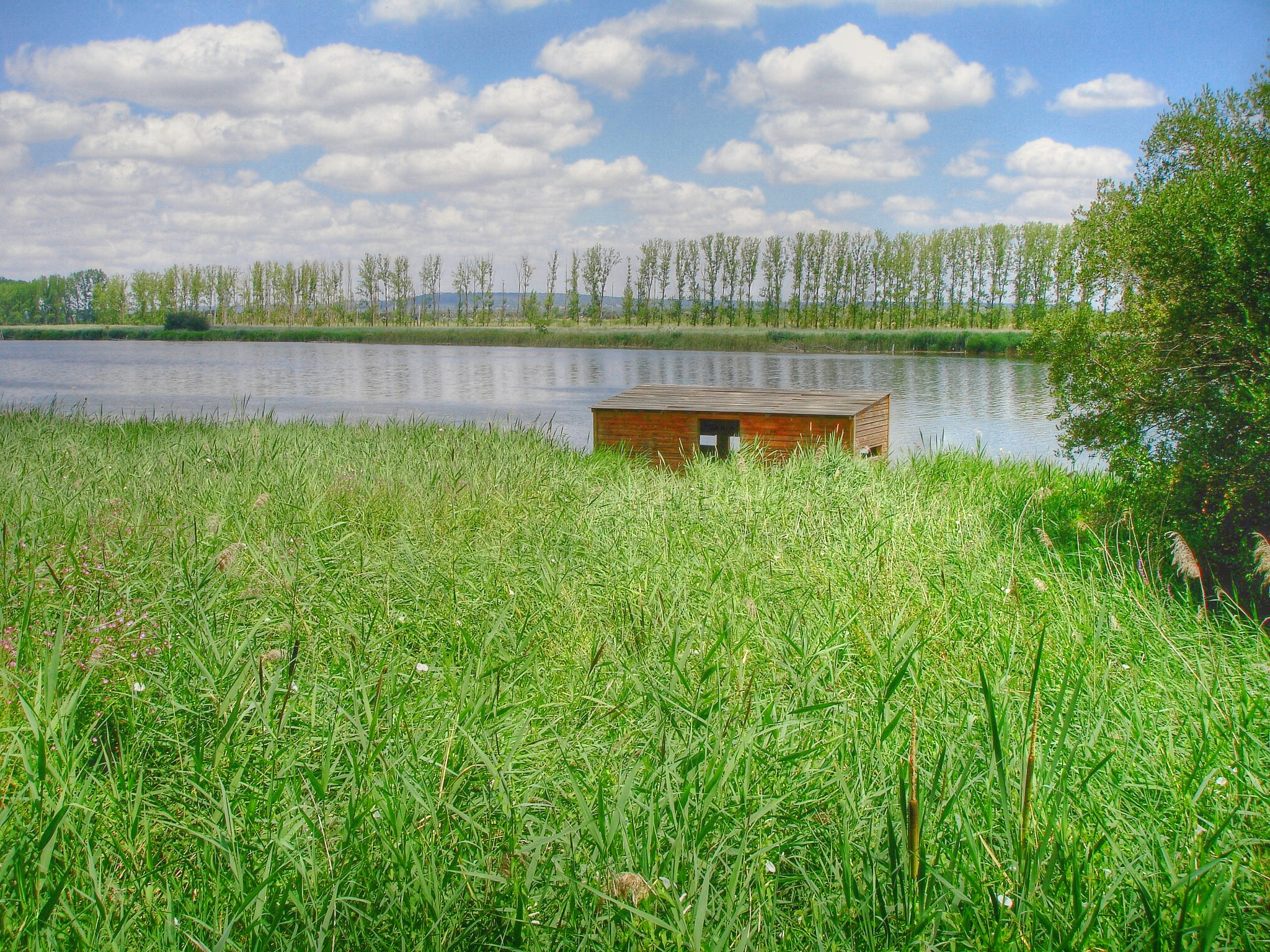
The Castronuño Banks Nature Reserve (Riberas de Castronuño-Vega del Duero) is the only protected natural area in this province. It is crossed by the Douro.

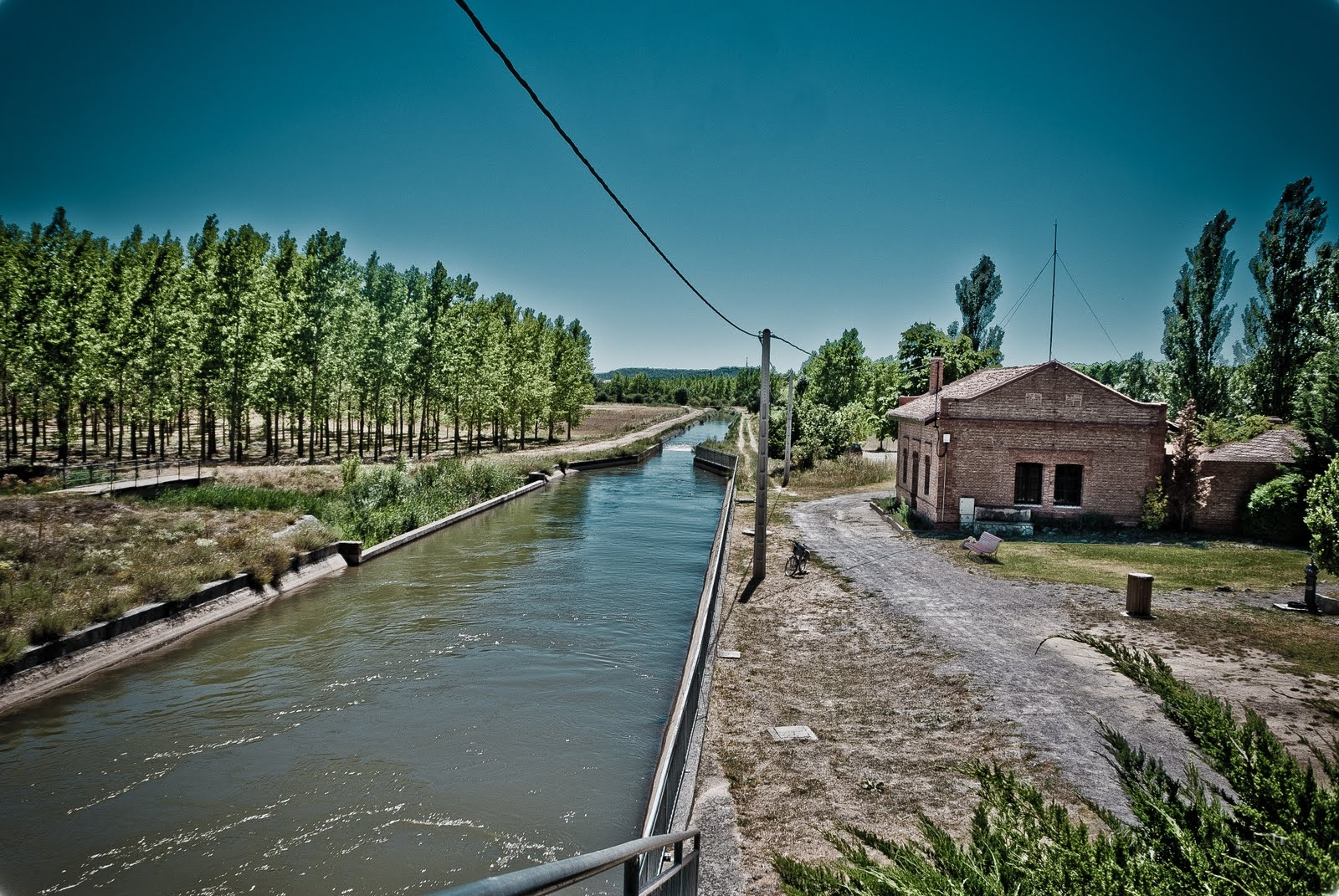
Canal of Castile.

- Nature Reserve Banks of Castronuño (Spanish: Reserva Natural de las Riberas de Castronuño-Vega del Duero): Located in the Montes Torozos shire, this is an area of moorland and sedimentary floodplains. It is a migratory and nesting area for waterbirds. The Duero is surrounded by riparian forests and constitutes a very interesting swamp ecosystem. It is an area of great plains and an absence of high elevations. Fauna is abundant, including herons, night herons, little egrets, snakes, northern shovelers, common pochards, tufted ducks, cormorants, hobbies, ospreys, grass snakes, ladder snakes, peregrine falcons, ocellated lizards, San Antonio frogs, midwife toads, polecats, and badgers. The nature reserve is considered a Special Protection Area for Birds.
- Canal of Castile (Spanish: Canal de Castilla): Construction started in 1753 and took almost a century to complete; it opened in 1849. It is shaped like an inverted "Y" and its purpose was the transport of Castilian wheat toward the ports of the Cantabrian Sea, but the arrival of the railroad soon made it obsolete. It crosses nine municipalities in the province. With the passage of time, a series of wetlands of high ecological value have formed along the banks of the canal, representing an island of biodiversity. Its high ecological value is related to its diverse aquatic vegetation and the large number of vertebrate species supported by them. The canal hosts 121 species of nesting, wintering, and accidental birds; 42 species of mammals, 15 of them insectivorous; 11 species of amphibians; 14 reptiles; and 14 species of fish.

=== Flora and vegetation ===
Vegetation is typical of the plateau (700–800 metres above sea level), with various species of pine (Pinus pinea and Pinus pinaster), holm oak (Quercus ilex), oak (Quercus pyrenaica and Quercus faginea), Cork oak (Quercus suber), elms, poplars, ashes, willows, alders, honeysuckles, cane, bulrushes, shrubs and pastures.

=== Fauna ===
In general, animals found in the area are those of a typical Mediterranean plateau, such as the European rabbit, red squirrel, European hedgehog, common vole, partridge, little bustard and great bustard, white stork, barn swallow, European robin, common cuckoo, common nightingale, common woodpigeon, Eurasian magpie, mallard, greylag goose, Spanish sparrow and House sparrow, Perez's frog, Montagu's harrier, western marsh harrier, hen harrier, peregrine falcon, short-toed snake eagle, lesser kestrel, common crane, pin-tailed sandgrouse, Geoffroy's bat, trout, common carp, crayfish, Eurasian otter, shrew, Iberian hare, roe deer, wild boar, red fox and grey wolf.

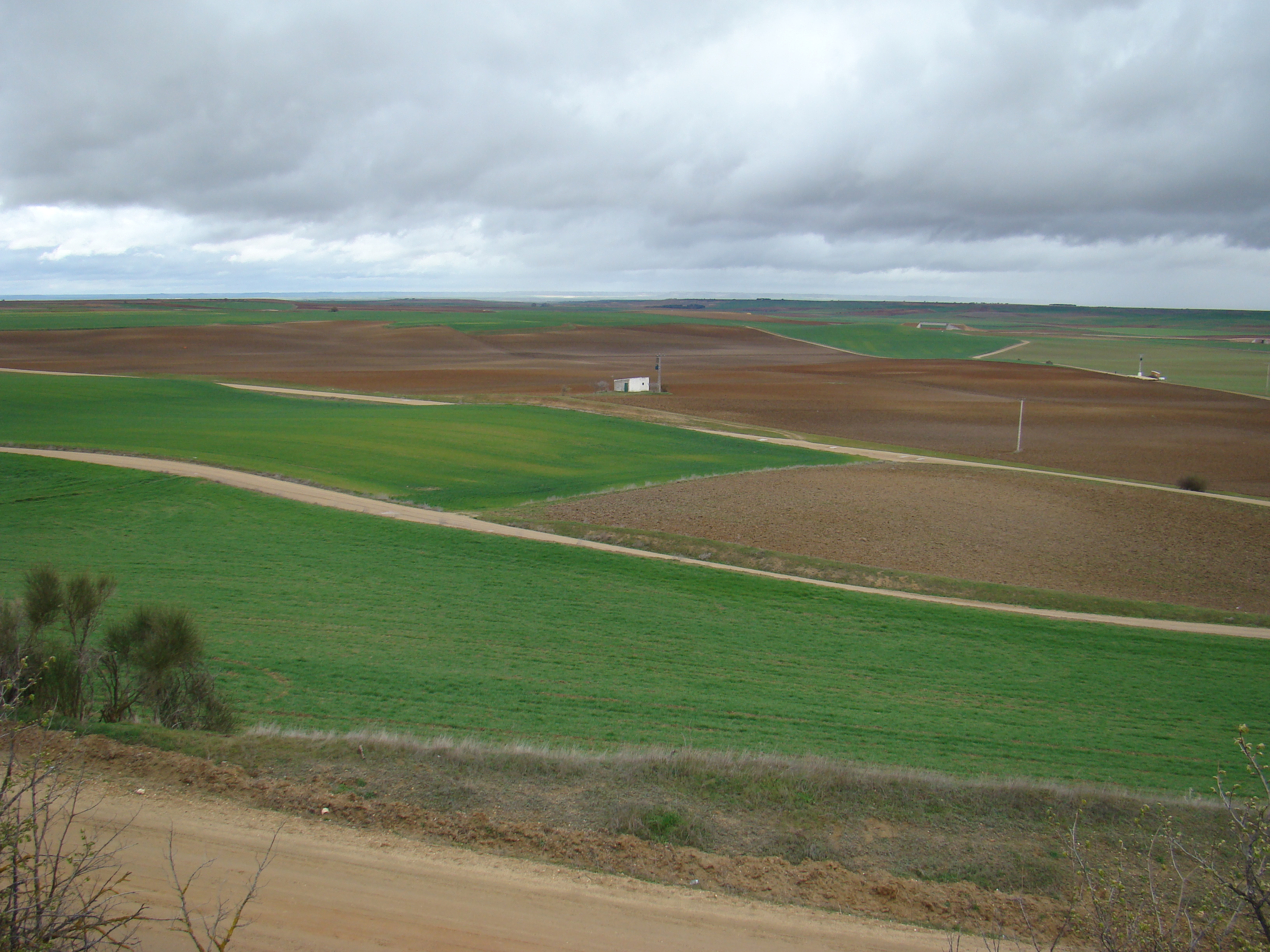
Cultivated fields

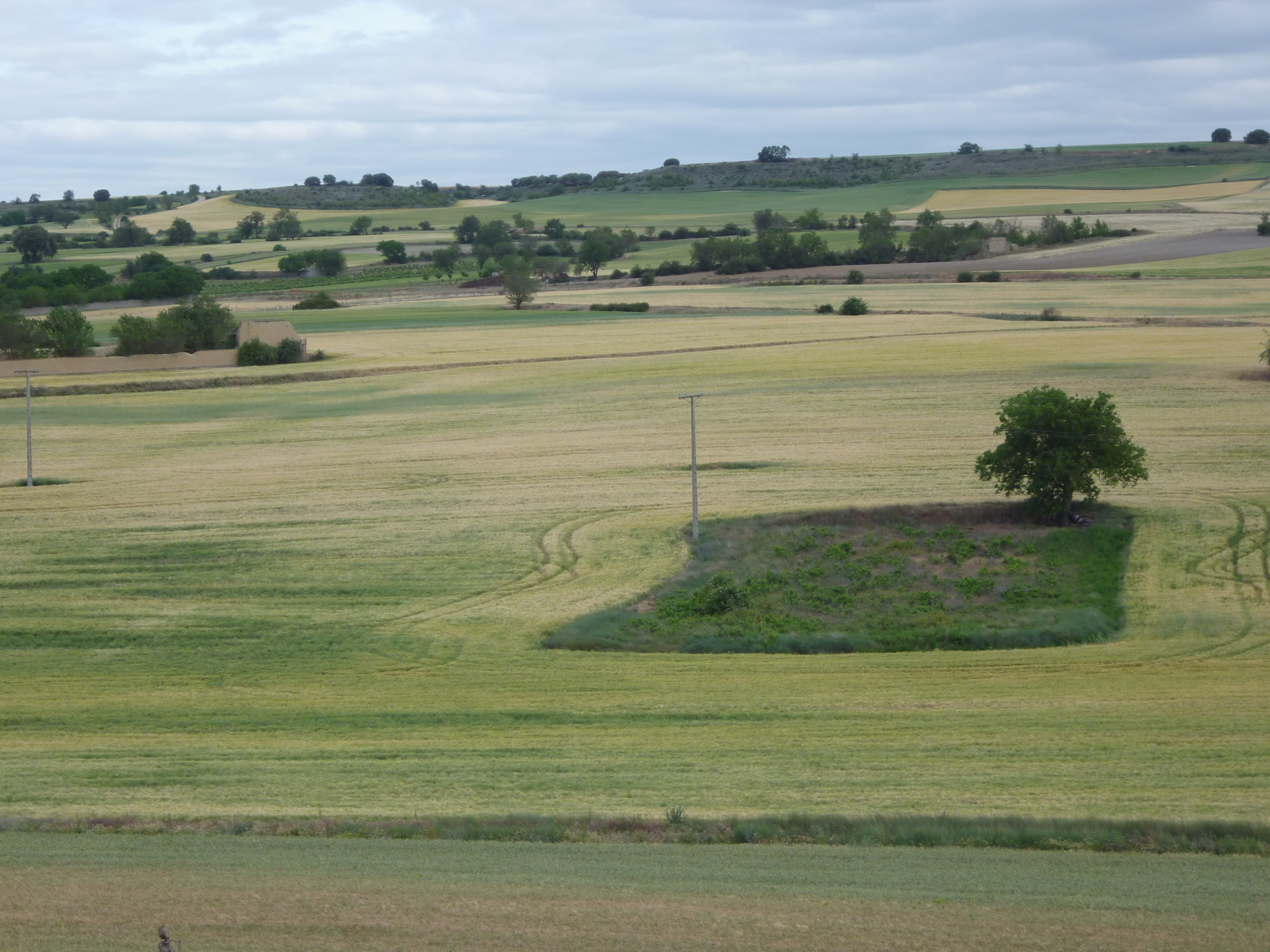
Typical field

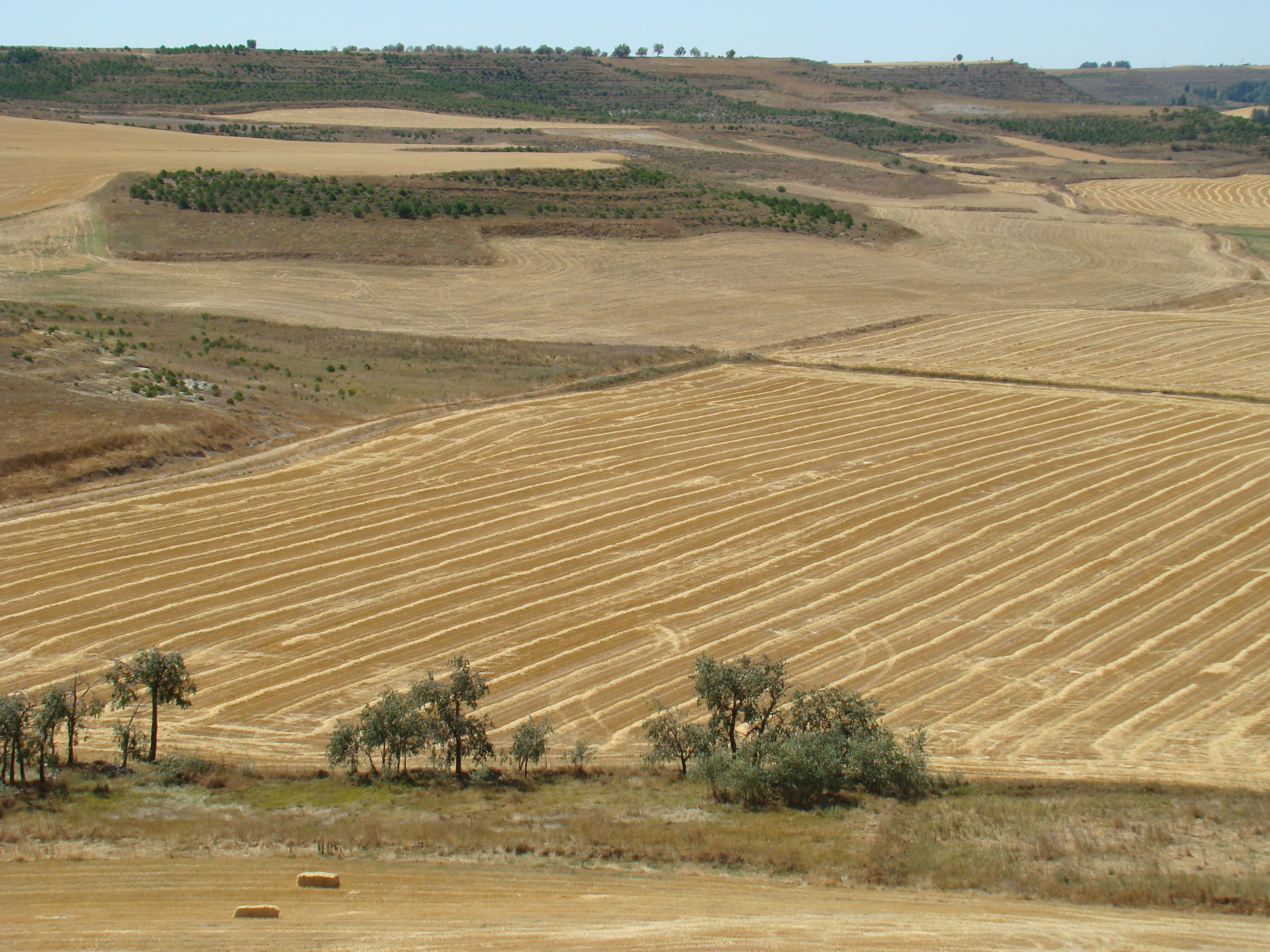
Harvest field

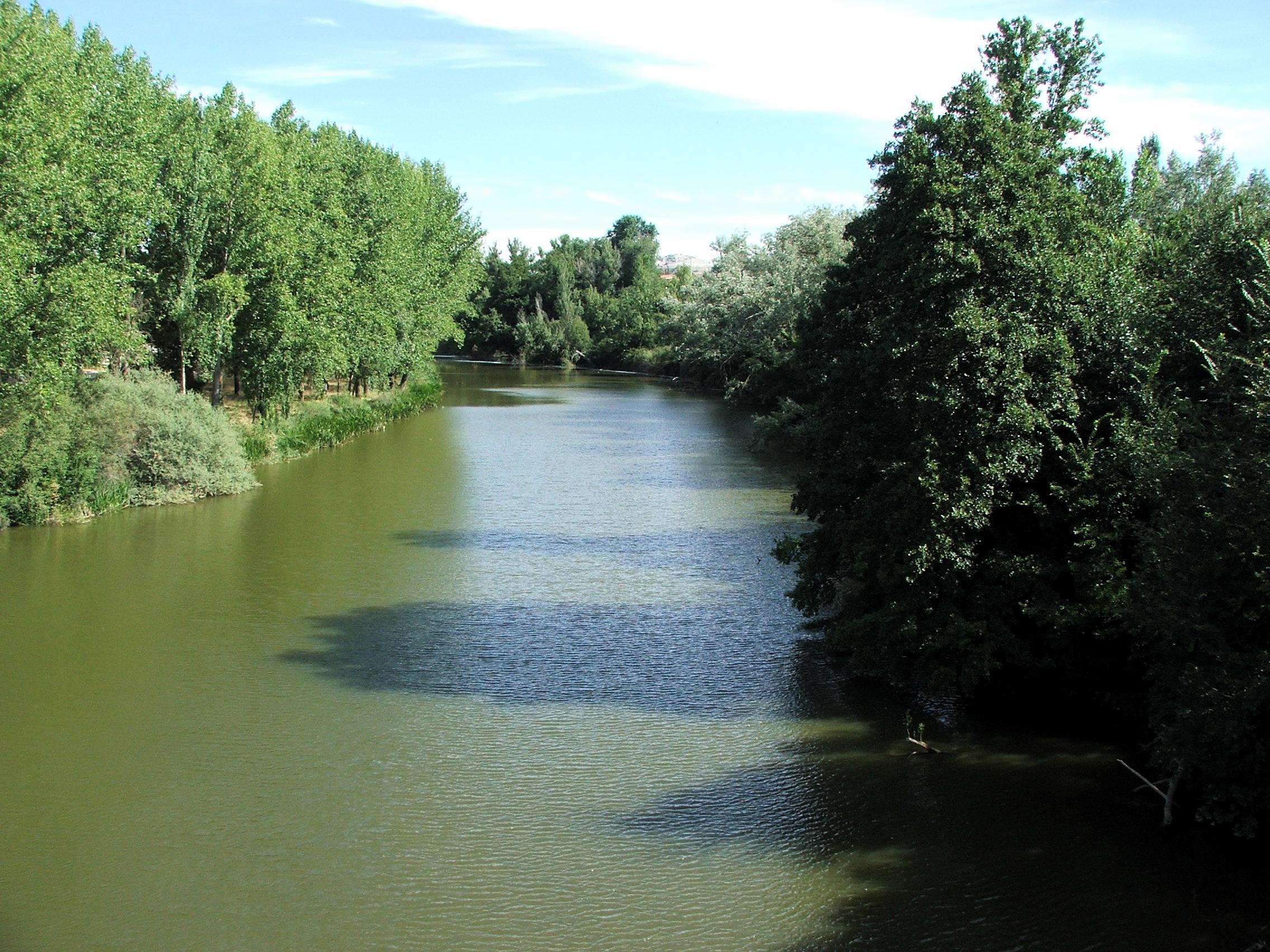
Douro River

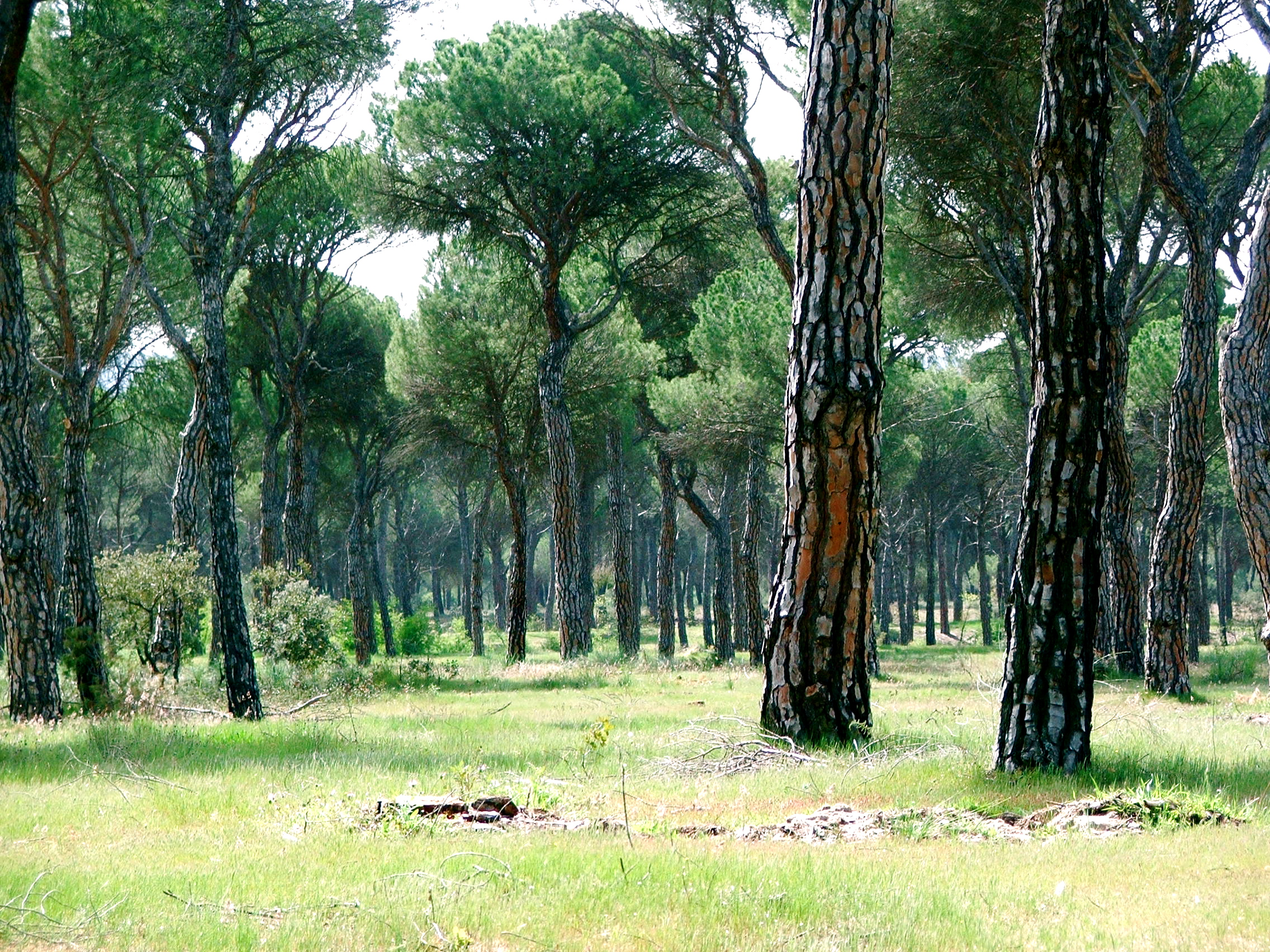
Pines

== Government and politics ==
Tierra de Campos Montes Torozos Tierra del Vino Tierra de Medina Campiña del Pisuerga Páramos del Esgueva Campo de Peñafiel Tierra de Pinares

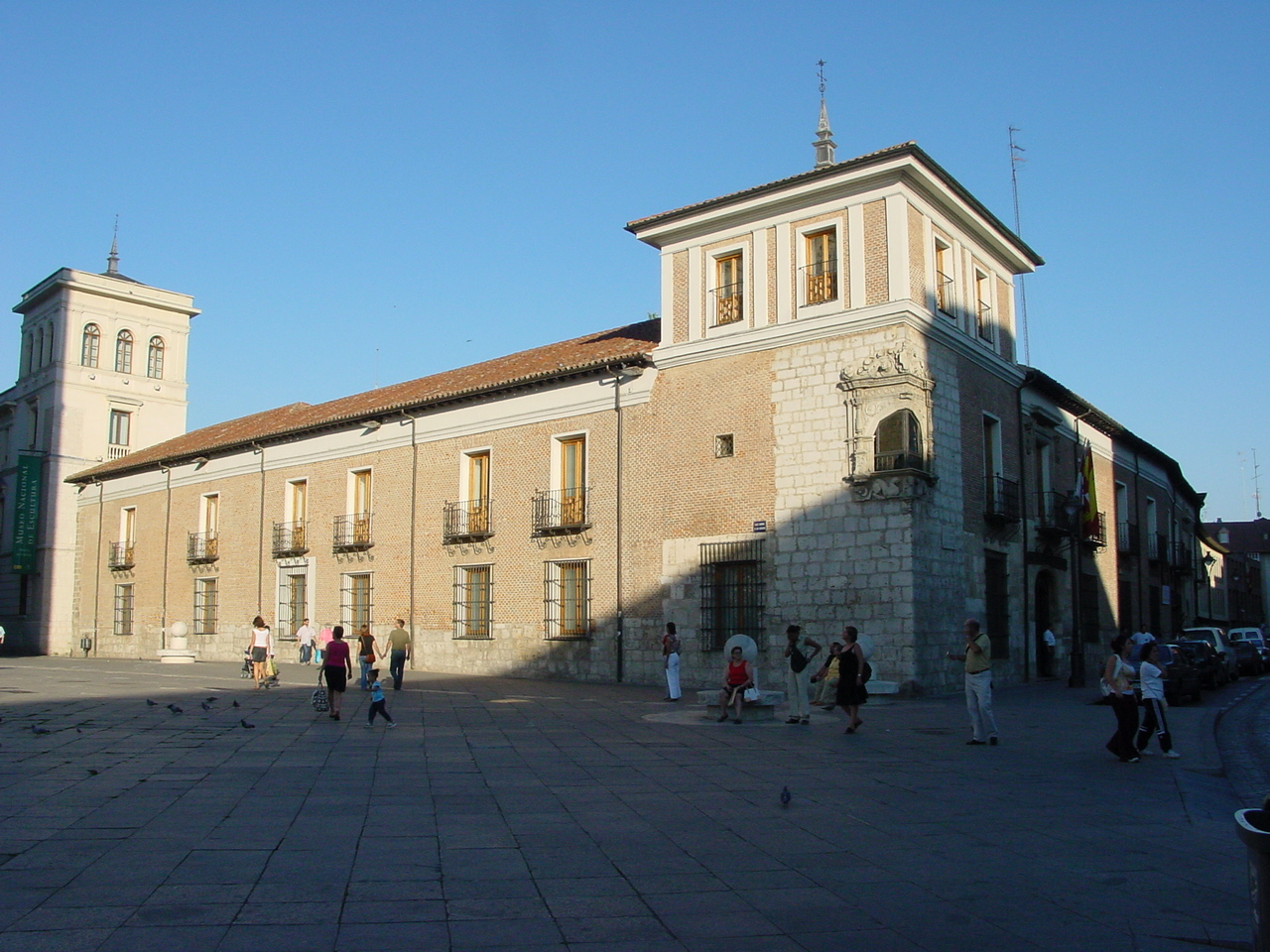
Pimentel Palace, headquarters of the Provincial Government.

The Province of Valladolid was established by the Royal Decree of 30 November 1833, driven by the minister Javier de Burgos, like the rest of the provinces of the country (see: 1833 territorial division of Spain). This division considered the common historic, cultural, and economic characteristics of each territory.

The government and administration of the province of Valladolid is the responsibility of the Provincial Council of Valladolid, as outlined in the statute of autonomy of Castile and León. Its headquarters have been located in the Pimentel Palace of Valladolid since 1875, when the building was purchased by the Provincial Government.

=== Political divisions ===
Today, the province does not have official divisions, but historically it has been divided into eight comarcas (a Spanish term for shires):

- Tierra de Campos ("Land of Fields")
- Montes Torozos ("Torozos Mountains")
- Campiña del Pisuerga ("The Pisuerga Countryside")
- Páramos del Esgueva ("Esgueva's Moorland")
- Tierra del Vino ("Land of Wine")
- Tierra de Pinares ("Land of Pines")
- Campo de Peñafiel ("Peñafiel Field")
- Tierra de Medina ("Land of Medina")

=== Municipalities ===
The province has 225 municipalities:

- Adalia
- Aguasal
- Aguilar de Campos
- Alaejos
- Alcazarén
- Aldea de San Miguel
- Aldeamayor de San Martín
- Almenara de Adaja
- Amusquillo
- Arroyo de la Encomienda
- Ataquines
- Bahabón
- Barcial de la Loma
- Barruelo del Valle
- Becilla de Valderaduey
- Benafarces
- Bercero
- Berceruelo
- Berrueces
- Bobadilla del Campo
- Bocigas
- Bocos de Duero
- Boecillo
- Bolaños de Campos
- Brahojos de Medina
- Bustillo de Chaves
- Cabezón de Pisuerga
- Cabezón de Valderaduey
- Cabreros del Monte
- Campaspero
- El Campillo
- Camporredondo
- Canalejas de Peñafiel
- Canillas de Esgueva
- Carpio
- Casasola de Arión
- Castrejón de Trabancos
- Castrillo de Duero
- Castrillo-Tejeriego
- Castrobol
- Castrodeza
- Castromembibre
- Castromonte
- Castronuevo de Esgueva
- Castronuño
- Castroponce
- Castroverde de Cerrato
- Ceinos de Campos
- Cervillego de la Cruz
- Cigales
- Ciguñuela
- Cistérniga
- Cogeces de Íscar
- Cogeces del Monte
- Corcos
- Corrales de Duero
- Cubillas de Santa Marta
- Cuenca de Campos
- Curiel de Duero
- Encinas de Esgueva
- Esguevillas de Esgueva
- Fombellida
- Fompedraza
- Fontihoyuelo
- Fresno el Viejo
- Fuensaldaña
- Fuente el Sol
- Fuente-Olmedo
- Gallegos de Hornija
- Gatón de Campos
- Geria
- Herrín de Campos
- Hornillos de Eresma
- Íscar
- Laguna de Duero
- Langayo
- Llano de Olmedo
- Lomoviejo
- Manzanillo
- Marzales
- Matapozuelos
- Matilla de los Caños
- Mayorga
- Medina de Rioseco
- Medina del Campo
- Megeces
- Melgar de Abajo
- Melgar de Arriba
- Mojados
- Monasterio de Vega
- Montealegre de Campos
- Montemayor de Pililla
- Moral de la Reina
- Moraleja de las Panaderas
- Morales de Campos
- Mota del Marqués
- Mucientes
- La Mudarra
- Muriel de Zapardiel
- Nava del Rey
- Nueva Villa de las Torres
- Olivares de Duero
- Olmedo
- Olmos de Esgueva
- Olmos de Peñafiel
- Palazuelo de Vedija
- La Parrilla
- La Pedraja de Portillo
- Pedrajas de San Esteban
- Pedrosa del Rey
- Peñafiel
- Peñaflor de Hornija
- Pesquera de Duero
- Piña de Esgueva
- Piñel de Abajo
- Piñel de Arriba
- Pollos
- Portillo
- Pozal de Gallinas
- Pozaldez
- Pozuelo de la Orden
- Puras
- Quintanilla de Arriba
- Quintanilla de Onésimo
- Quintanilla de Trigueros
- Quintanilla del Molar
- Rábano
- Ramiro
- Renedo de Esgueva
- Roales de Campos
- Robladillo
- Roturas
- Rubí de Bracamonte
- Rueda
- Saelices de Mayorga
- Salvador de Zapardiel
- San Cebrián de Mazote
- San Llorente
- San Martín de Valvení
- San Miguel del Arroyo
- San Miguel del Pino
- San Pablo de la Moraleja
- San Pedro de Latarce
- San Pelayo
- San Román de Hornija
- San Salvador
- San Vicente del Palacio
- Santa Eufemia del Arroyo
- Santervás de Campos
- Santibáñez de Valcorba
- Santovenia de Pisuerga
- Sardón de Duero
- La Seca
- Serrada
- Siete Iglesias de Trabancos
- Simancas
- Tamariz de Campos
- Tiedra
- Tordehumos
- Tordesillas
- Torre de Esgueva
- Torre de Peñafiel
- Torrecilla de la Abadesa
- Torrecilla de la Orden
- Torrecilla de la Torre
- Torrelobatón
- Torrescárcela
- Traspinedo
- Trigueros del Valle
- Tudela de Duero
- La Unión de Campos
- Urones de Castroponce
- Urueña
- Valbuena de Duero
- Valdearcos de la Vega
- Valdenebro de los Valles
- Valdestillas
- Valdunquillo
- Valladolid
- Valoria la Buena
- Valverde de Campos
- Vega de Ruiponce
- Vega de Valdetronco
- Velascálvaro
- Velilla
- Velliza
- Ventosa de la Cuesta
- Viana de Cega
- Villabáñez
- Villabaruz de Campos
- Villabrágima
- Villacarralón
- Villacid de Campos
- Villaco
- Villafrades de Campos
- Villafranca de Duero
- Villafrechós
- Villafuerte de Esgueva
- Villagarcía de Campos
- Villagómez la Nueva
- Villalán de Campos
- Villalar de los Comuneros
- Villalba de la Loma
- Villalba de los Alcores
- Villalbarba
- Villalón de Campos
- Villamuriel de Campos
- Villán de Tordesillas
- Villanubla
- Villanueva de Duero
- Villanueva de la Condesa
- Villanueva de los Caballeros
- Villanueva de los Infantes
- Villanueva de San Mancio
- Villardefrades
- Villarmentero de Esgueva
- Villasexmir
- Villavaquerín
- Villavellid
- Villaverde de Medina
- Villavicencio de los Caballeros
- Viloria
- Wamba
- Zaratán
- La Zarza

== Demographics ==
As of 2026, the population is 528,644, of which 48.7% are male, and 51.3% are female. Minors make up 14.8% of the population, and seniors make up 25.1%.

Historical population

| Year | Pop. | ±% |
|---|---|---|
| 1842 | 156,430 | — |
| 1857 | 244,023 | +56.0% |
| 1877 | 250,473 | +2.6% |
| 1887 | 270,938 | +8.2% |
| 1900 | 283,045 | +4.5% |
| 1910 | 293,069 | +3.5% |
| 1920 | 294,410 | +0.5% |
| 1930 | 311,414 | +5.8% |
| 1940 | 332,934 | +6.9% |

| Year | Pop. | ±% |
|---|---|---|
| 1950 | 348,185 | +4.6% |
| 1960 | 367,392 | +5.5% |
| 1970 | 413,026 | +12.4% |
| 1981 | 481,786 | +16.6% |
| 1991 | 494,207 | +2.6% |
| 2001 | 498,094 | +0.8% |
| 2011 | 532,765 | +7.0% |
| 2021 | 519,380 | −2.5% |

Source: INE

=== Immigration ===
As of 2025, immigrants make up 10.8% of the population. The 5 largest foreign countries of birth are Colombia, Morocco, Venezuela, Bulgaria, and Romania.

=== Most populous cities and towns ===
The twenty most populated municipalities in the province of Valladolid are the following (INE 2025):

Largest municipalities in the province of Valladolid INE (1 January 2025)
| Rank | | Pop. | Rank | | Pop. |
|---|---|---|---|---|---|
| 1 | Valladolid | 302,614 | 11 | Simancas | 5,533 |
| 2 | Laguna de Duero | 22,965 | 12 | Cigales | 5,454 |
| 3 | Arroyo de la Encomienda | 22,800 | 13 | Peñafiel | 5,143 |
| 4 | Medina del Campo | 20,215 | 14 | Santovenia de Pisuerga | 4,762 |
| 5 | Cistérniga | 9,489 | 15 | Medina de Rioseco | 4,617 |
| 6 | Tudela de Duero | 8,861 | 16 | Boecillo | 4,446 |
| 7 | Tordesillas | 8,773 | 17 | Renedo de Esgueva | 3,993 |
| 8 | Íscar | 6,493 | 18 | Cabezón de Pisuerga | 3,910 |
| 9 | Zaratán | 6,386 | 19 | Olmedo | 3,592 |
| 10 | Aldeamayor de San Martín | 6,290 | 20 | Pedrajas de San Esteban | 3,434 |

Considering that the populations of Valladolid, Laguna de Duero, Arroyo de la Encomienda, and Medina del Campo represent almost 75% of the total of the 23 municipalities in the metropolitan area of Valladolid, there is a clear demographic contrast with highly depopulated areas of a marked rural character. Among the least inhabited areas of the province are Aguasal, Torrecilla de la Torre, Almenara de Adaja, San Salvador, and Fontihoyuelo, which do not exceed 40 registered inhabitants.

== Heritage ==
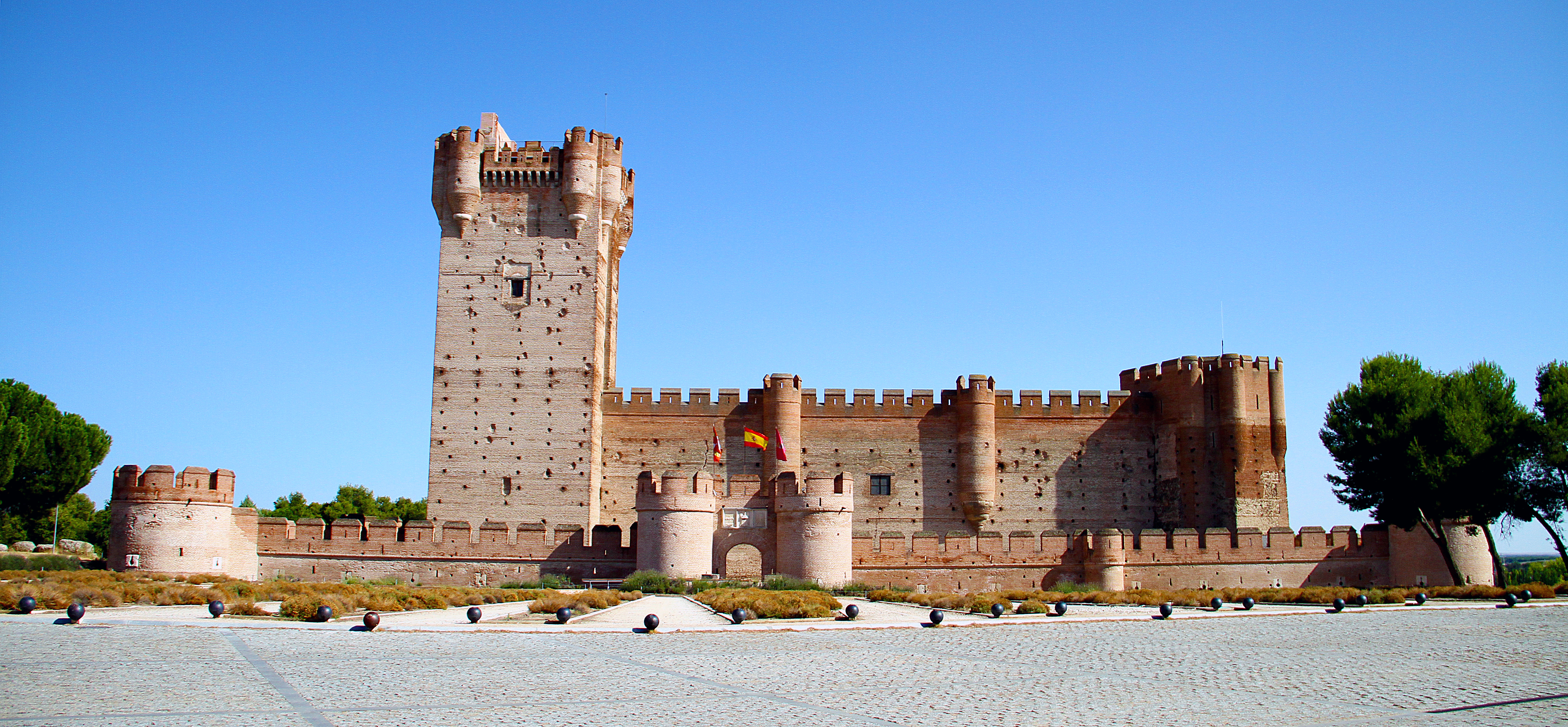
Castle of La Mota

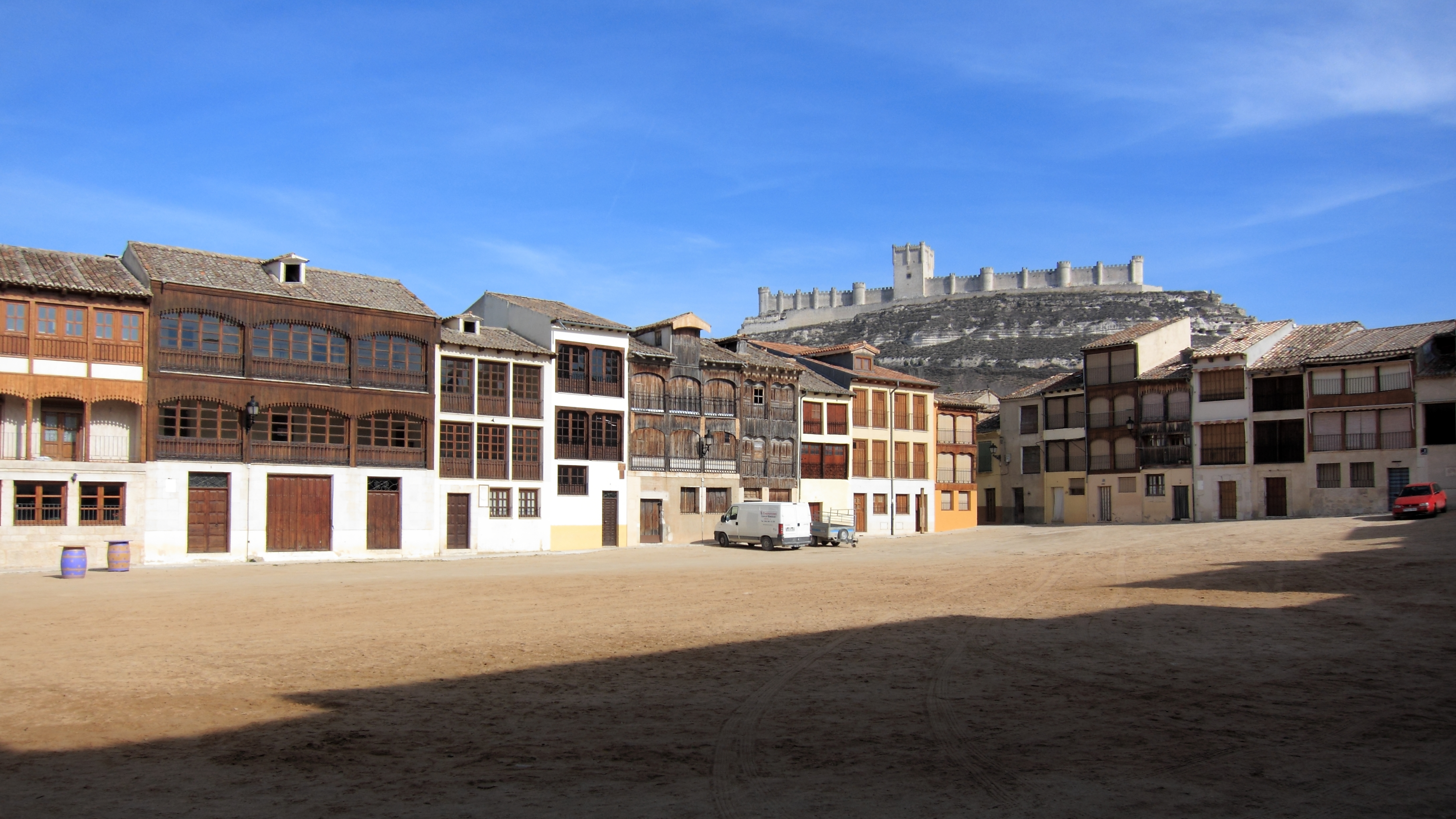
Castle of Peñafiel, view from Plaza del Coso

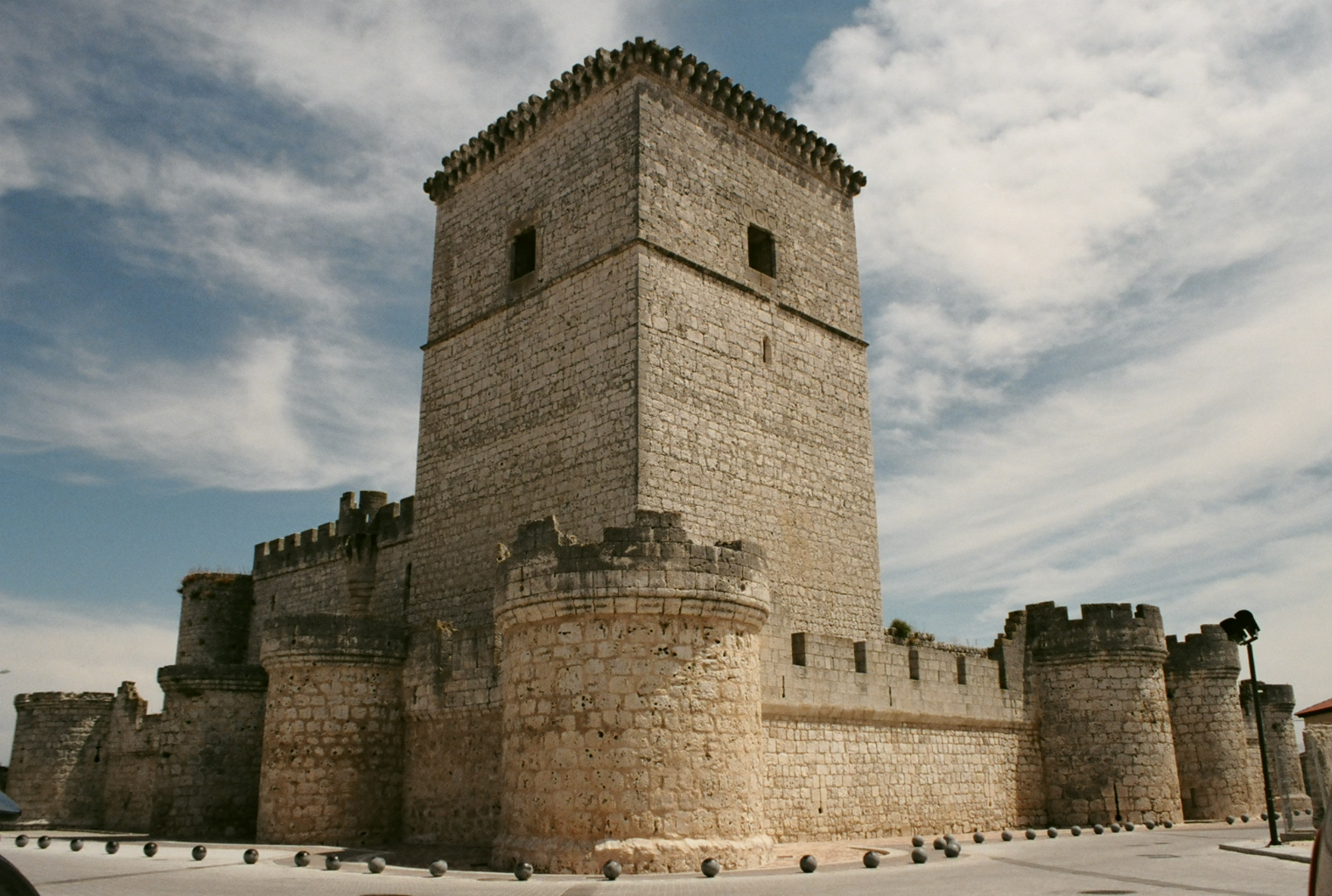
Portillo Castle

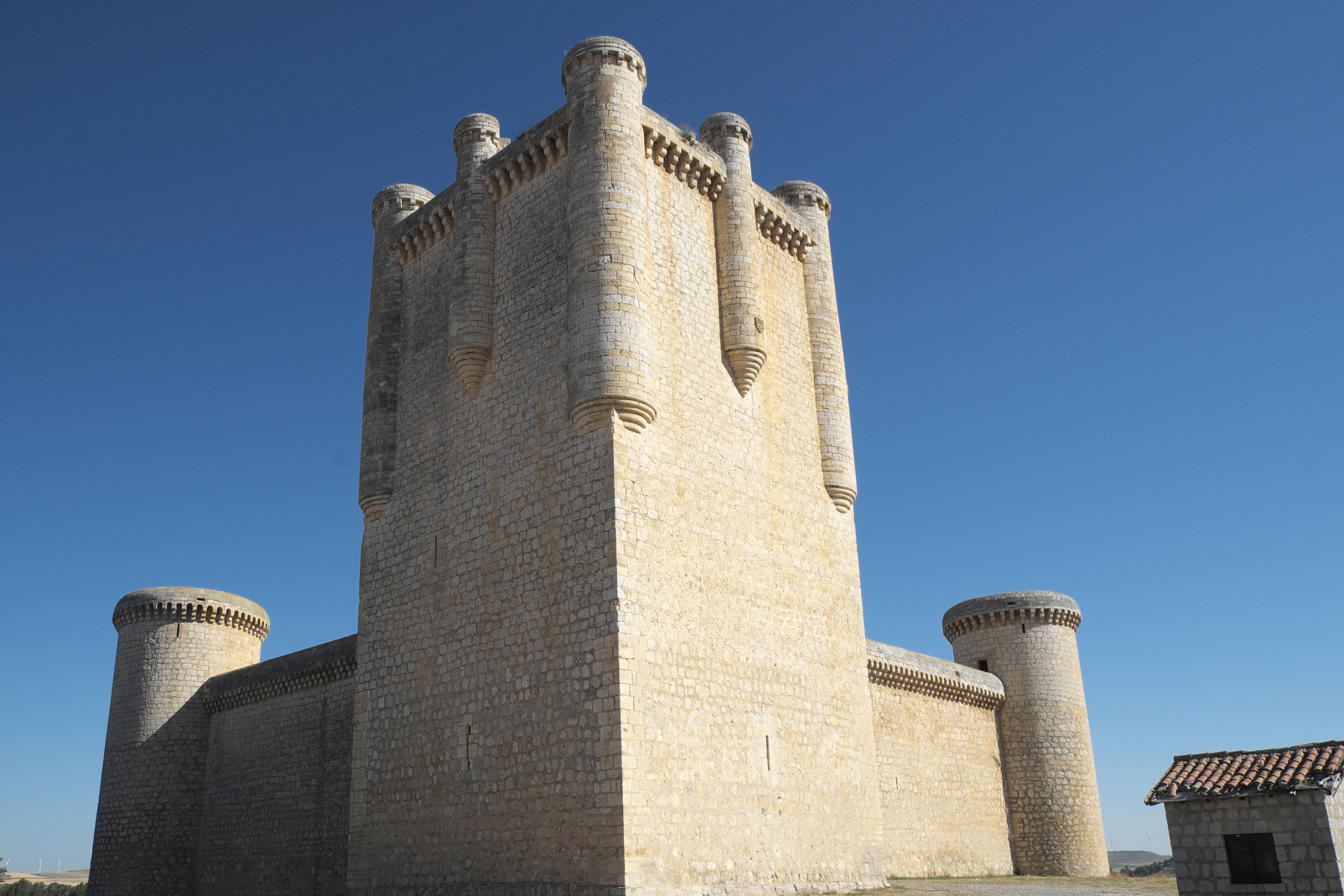
Castle of Torrelobatón

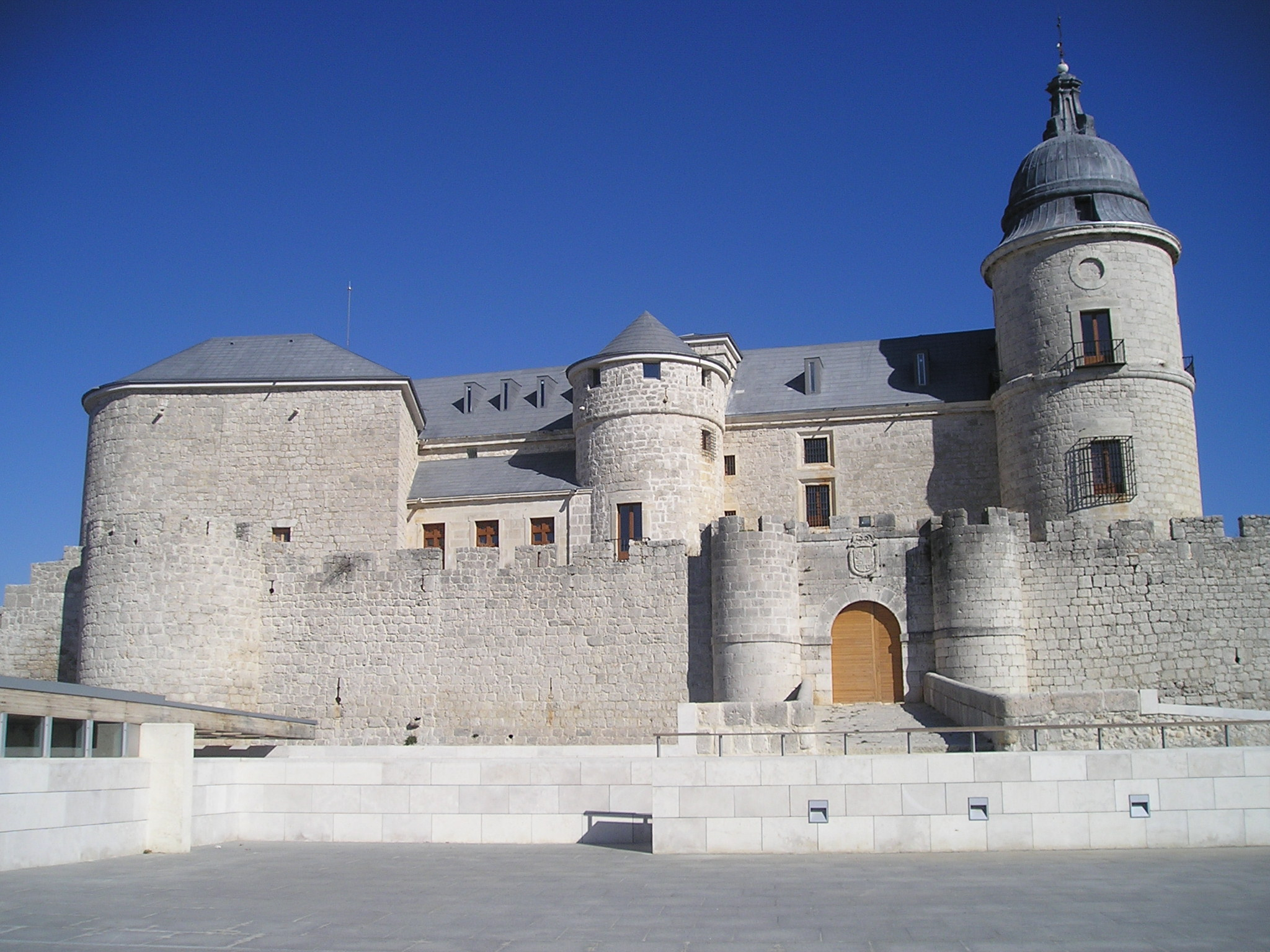
Castle of Simancas

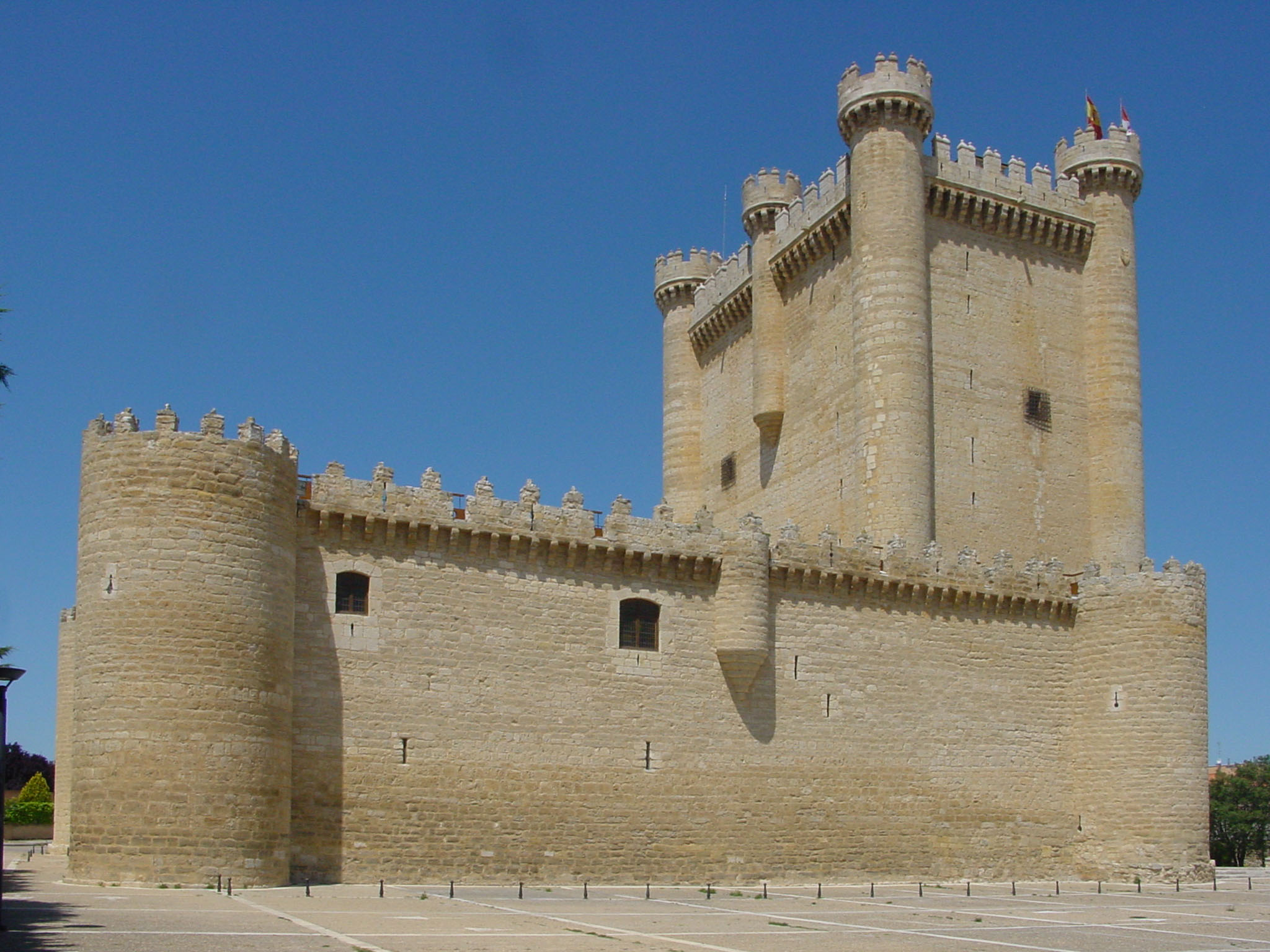
Fuensaldaña Castle

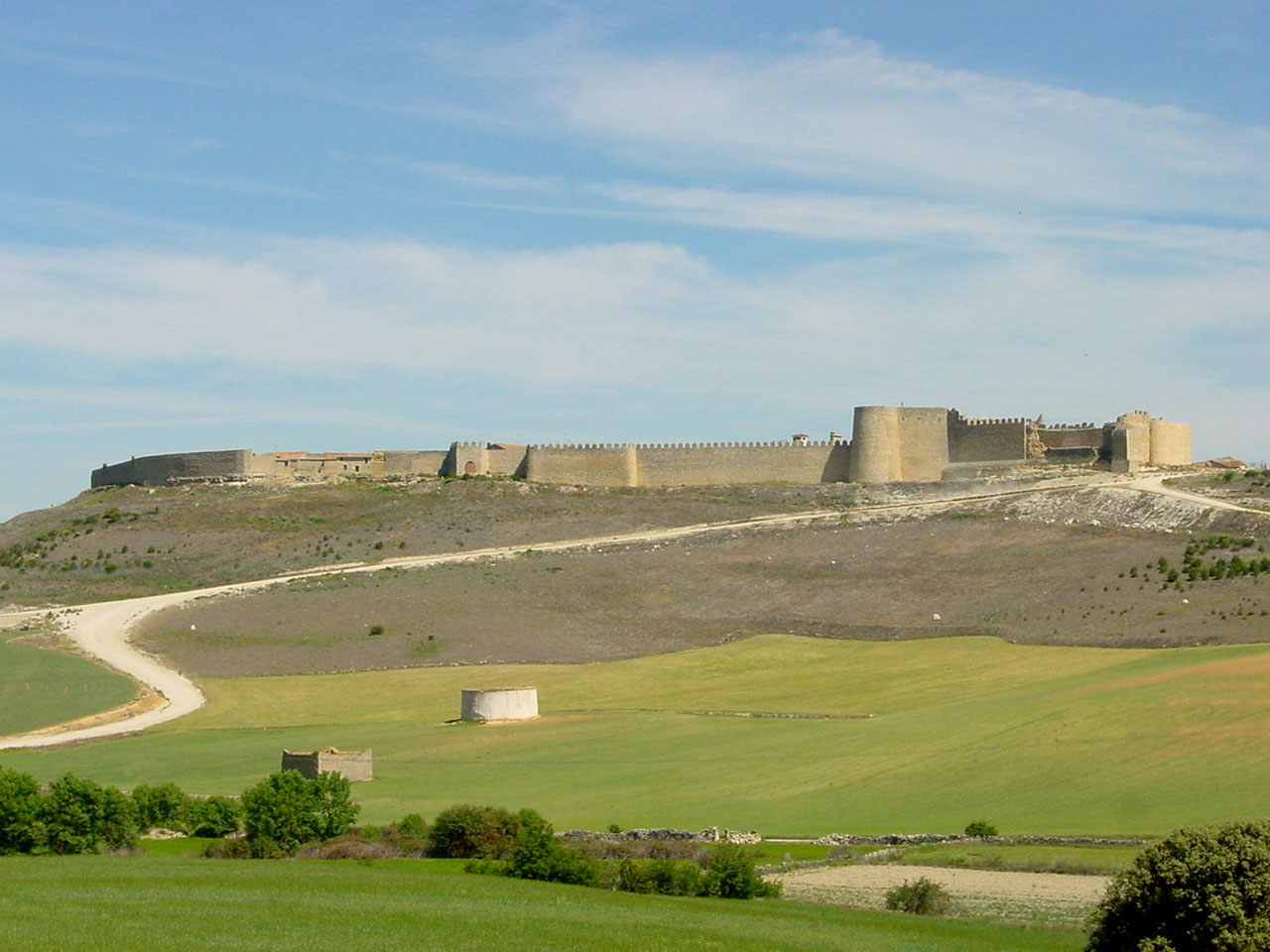
Walls of Urueña, a medieval town

The province has a total of 188 monuments considered Properties of Cultural Interest. Many are castles, churches, and historical sites, although there are also archaeological sites and archives. In the case of churches and monasteries, there is a wide variety of architectural styles, including Pre-Romanesque, Romanesque, Gothic, Renaissance and Baroque.

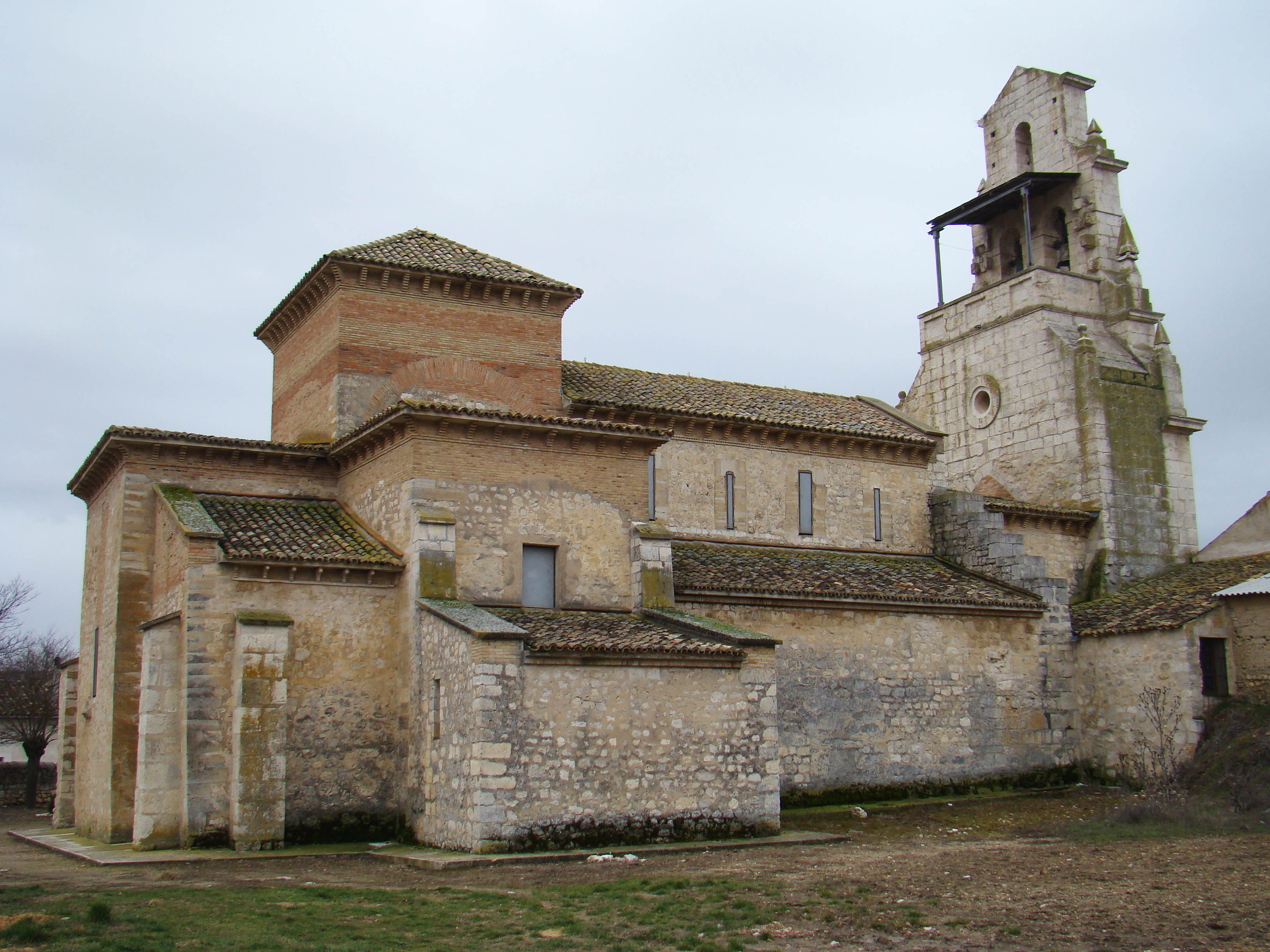
Church of San Cipriano of San Cebrián de Mazote, of Pre-Romanesque style.

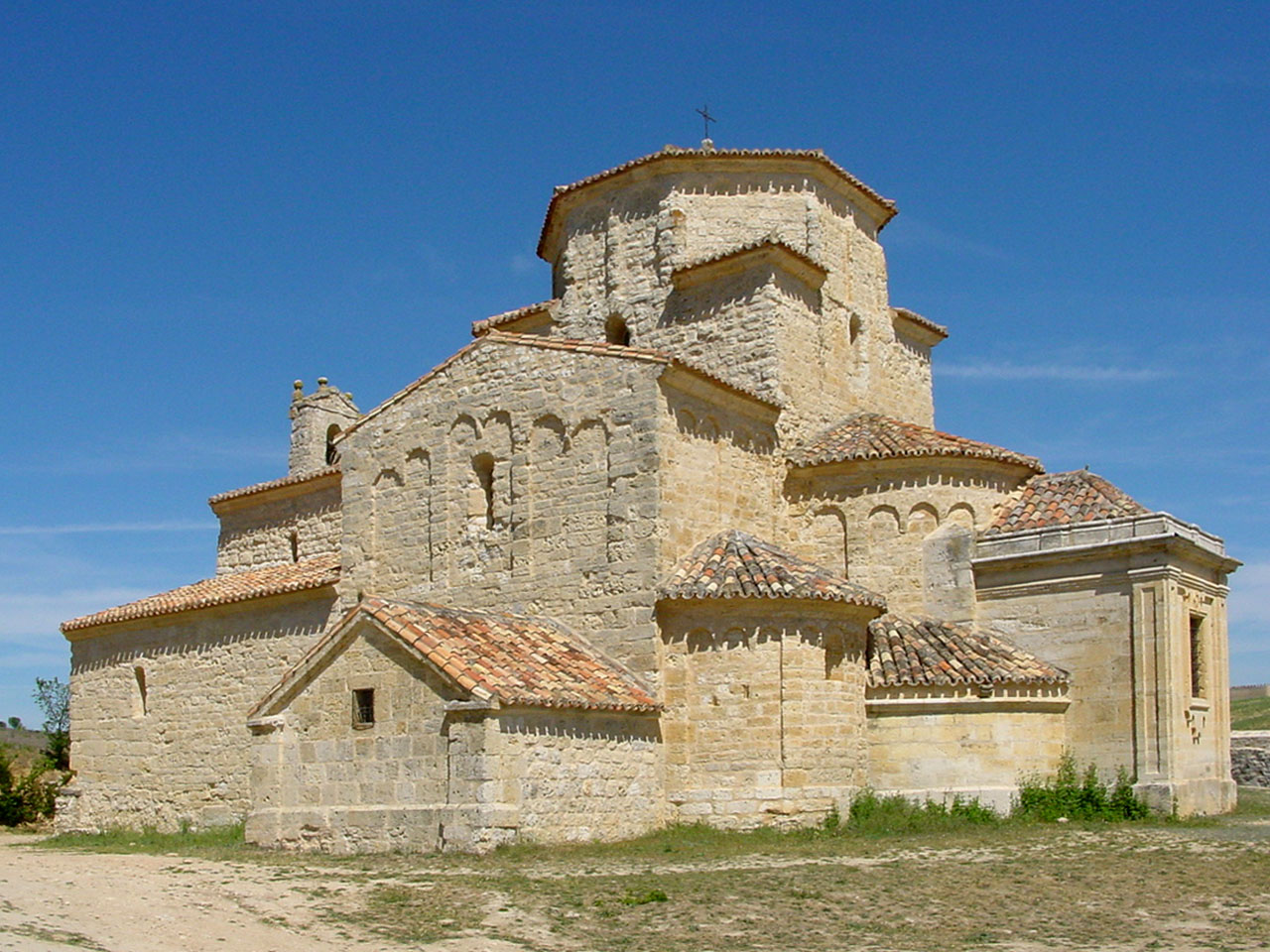
Church of Our Lady of the Announced of Urueña, example of Romanesque.

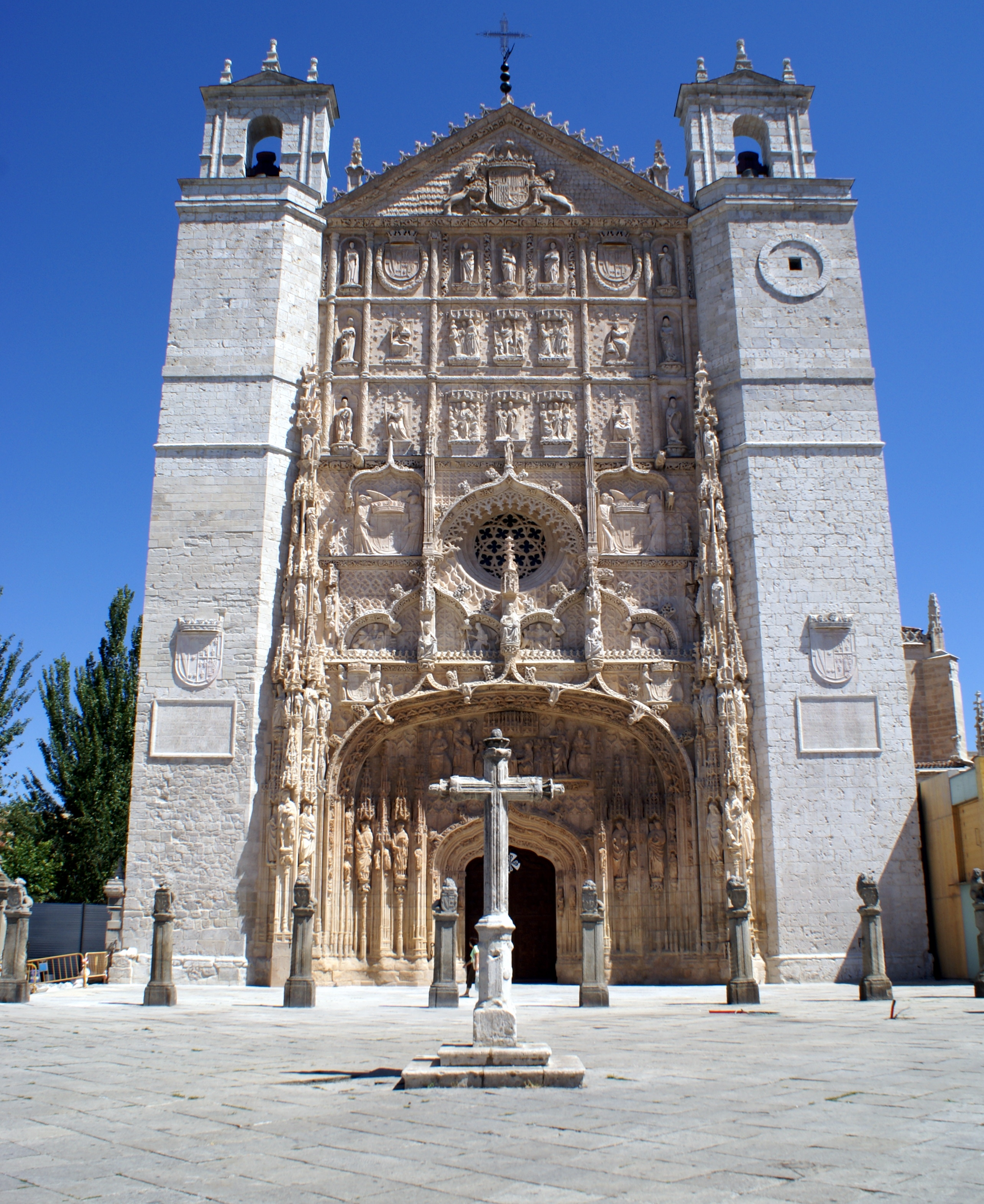
San Pablo Church (Valladolid), example of Gothic style.

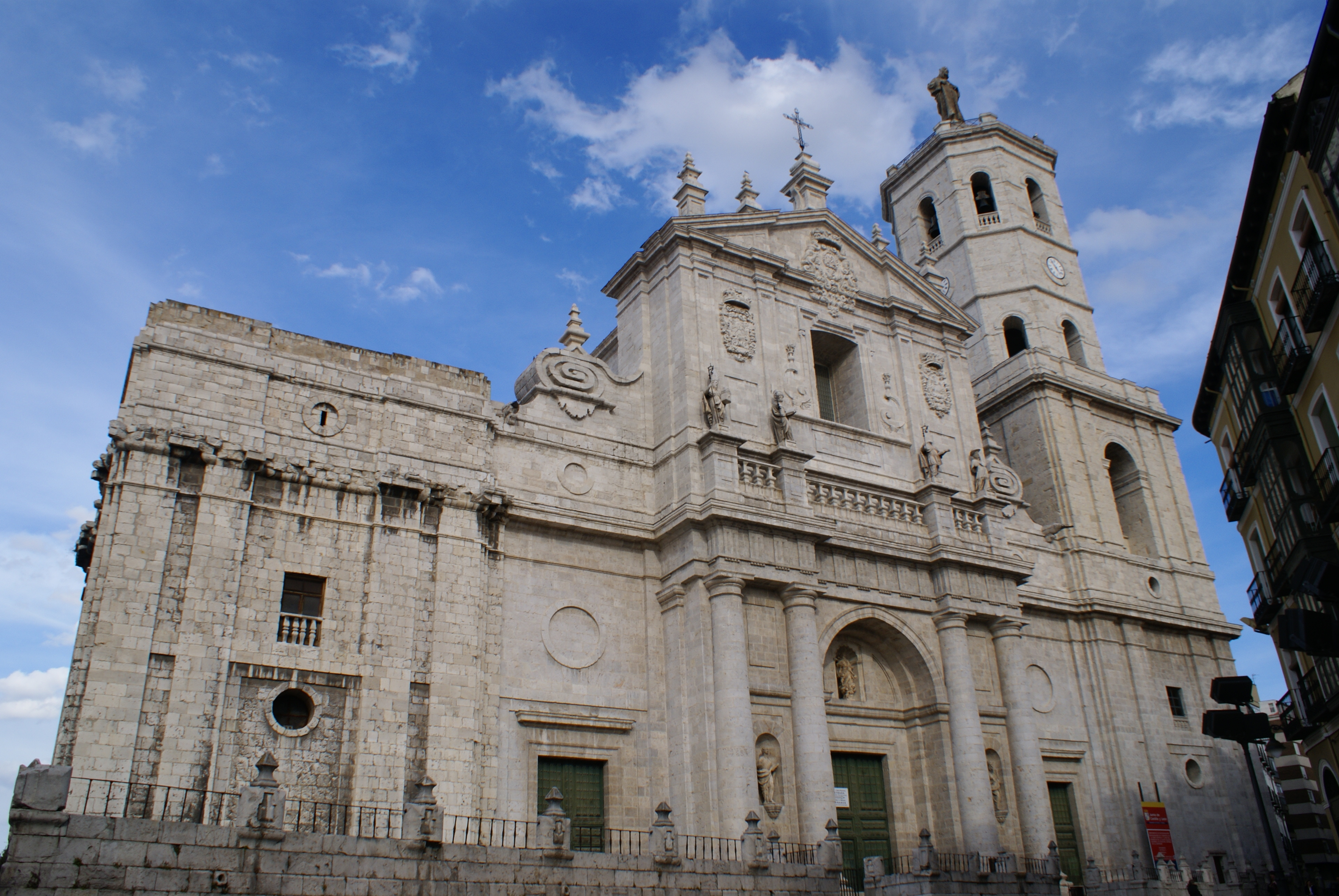
Cathedral of Valladolid, example of Renaissance Herrerian style.

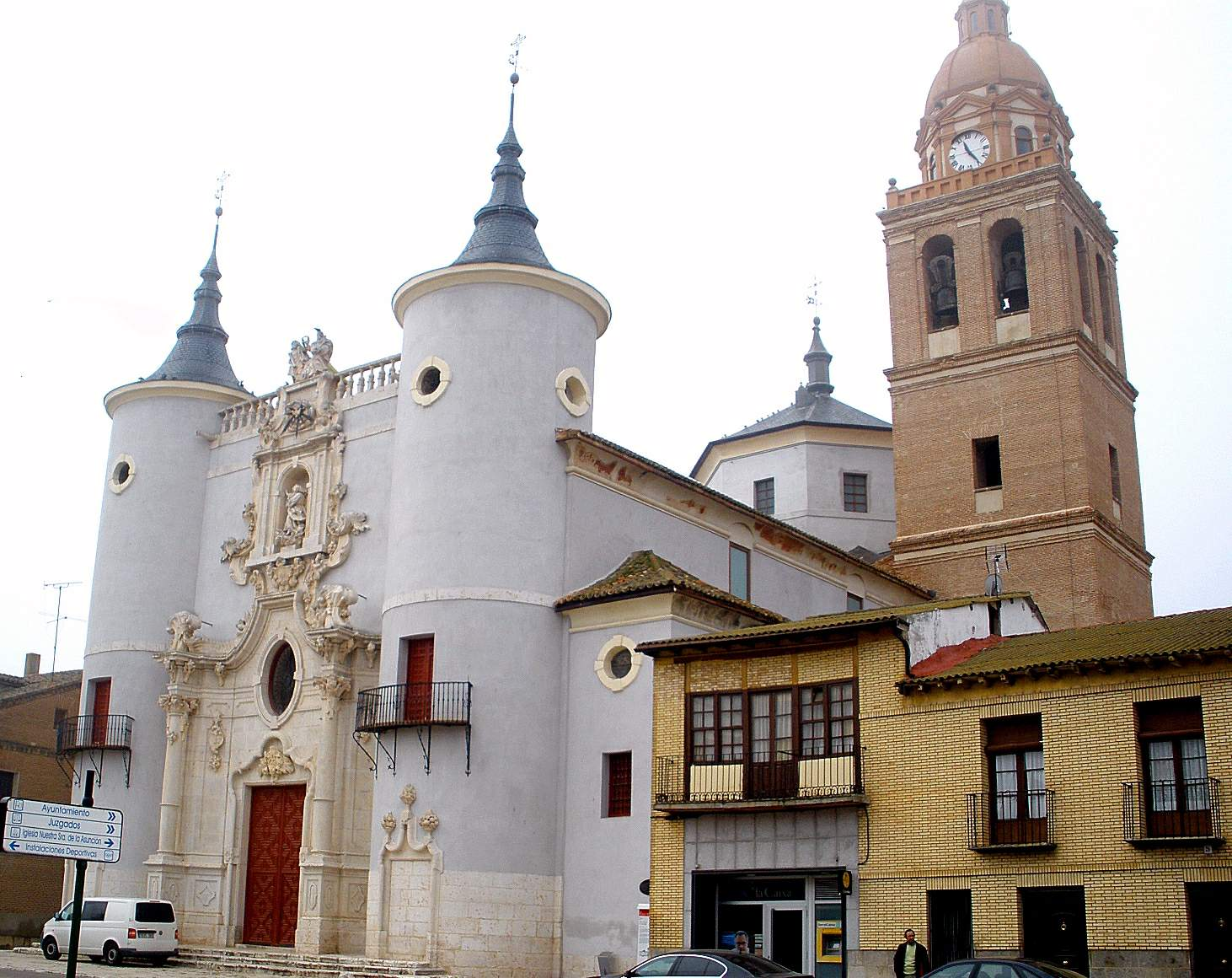
Church of Our Lady of the Assumption of Rueda, one of the best examples of Baroque.

=== Castles of Valladolid ===
The province of Valladolid is one of the European regions with the most castles, and is improving them for public use. The importance of these castles has led to the "School of Valladolid" (escuela de Valladolid) model of castle construction. The following castles are preserved in the province:

- Castromembibre Castle (Castromembibre)
- Peñafiel Castle (Peñafiel)
- Curiel de Duero Castle-Palace (Curiel de Duero)
- Curiel de Duero Castle (Curiel de Duero)
- Canillas de Esgueva Castle (Canillas de Esgueva)
- Encinas de Esgueva Castle (Encinas de Esgueva)
- Foncastín Castle (Foncastín)
- Fuensaldaña Castle (Fuensaldaña)
- Fuente el Sol Castle (Fuente el Sol)
- Íscar Castle (Íscar)
- La Mota Castle (Medina del Campo)
- Mota del Marqués Castle (Mota del Marqués)
- Montealegre Castle (Montealegre)
- Mucientes Castle (Mucientes)
- Portillo Castle (Portillo)
- San Pedro de Latarce Castle (San Pedro de Latarce)
- Tiedra Castle (Tiedra)
- Tordehumos Castle (Tordehumos)
- Castle of Torrelobatón (Torrelobatón)
- Trigueros del Valle Castle (Trigueros del Valle)
- Urueña Castle (Urueña)
- Villafuerte de Esgueva Castle (Villafuerte de Esgueva)
- Villagarcia de Campos Castle (Villagarcia de Campos)
- Villavellid Castle (Villavellid)
- Castle of Simancas (Simancas)
- Castroverde de Cerrato Castle (Castroverde de Cerrato)
- Villalba de los Alcores Castle (Villalba de los Alcores)
- Barcial de la Loma Castle (Barcial de la Loma)
- Alaejos Castle (Alaejos)
- Pozaldez Castle (Pozaldez)
- San Martín de Valvení Castle (San Martín de Valvení)
- Eván de Abajo Castle (Siete Iglesias de Trabancos)
- Eván de Arriba Castle (Siete Iglesias de Trabancos)
- Alderete Palace-Castle (Tordesillas)
- Villagómez la Nueva Castle (Villagómez la Nueva)

=== Walls ===
- Walls of Cigales (Cigales)
- Walls of Curiel de Duero (Curiel de Duero)
- Walls of Mayorga (Mayorga)
- Walls of Medina de Rioseco (Medina de Rioseco)
- Walls of Medina del Campo (Medina del Campo)
- Walls of Olmedo (Olmedo)
- Walls of Peñafiel (Peñafiel)
- Walls of Portillo (Portillo)
- Walls of Tordesillas (Tordesillas)
- Walls of Torrelobatón (Torrelobatón)
- Walls of Tudela de Duero (Tudela de Duero)
- Walls of Urueña (Urueña)
- Walls of Valbuena de Duero (Valbuena de Duero)
- Walls of Valladolid (Valladolid)
- Walls of Villabrágima (Villabrágima)
- Walls of Villalba de los Alcores (Villalba de los Alcores)

=== Monasteries ===
Monasteries are another important part of the province's cultural heritage. Some are in excellent condition, while others are preserved only as ruins. Some of the most important are:

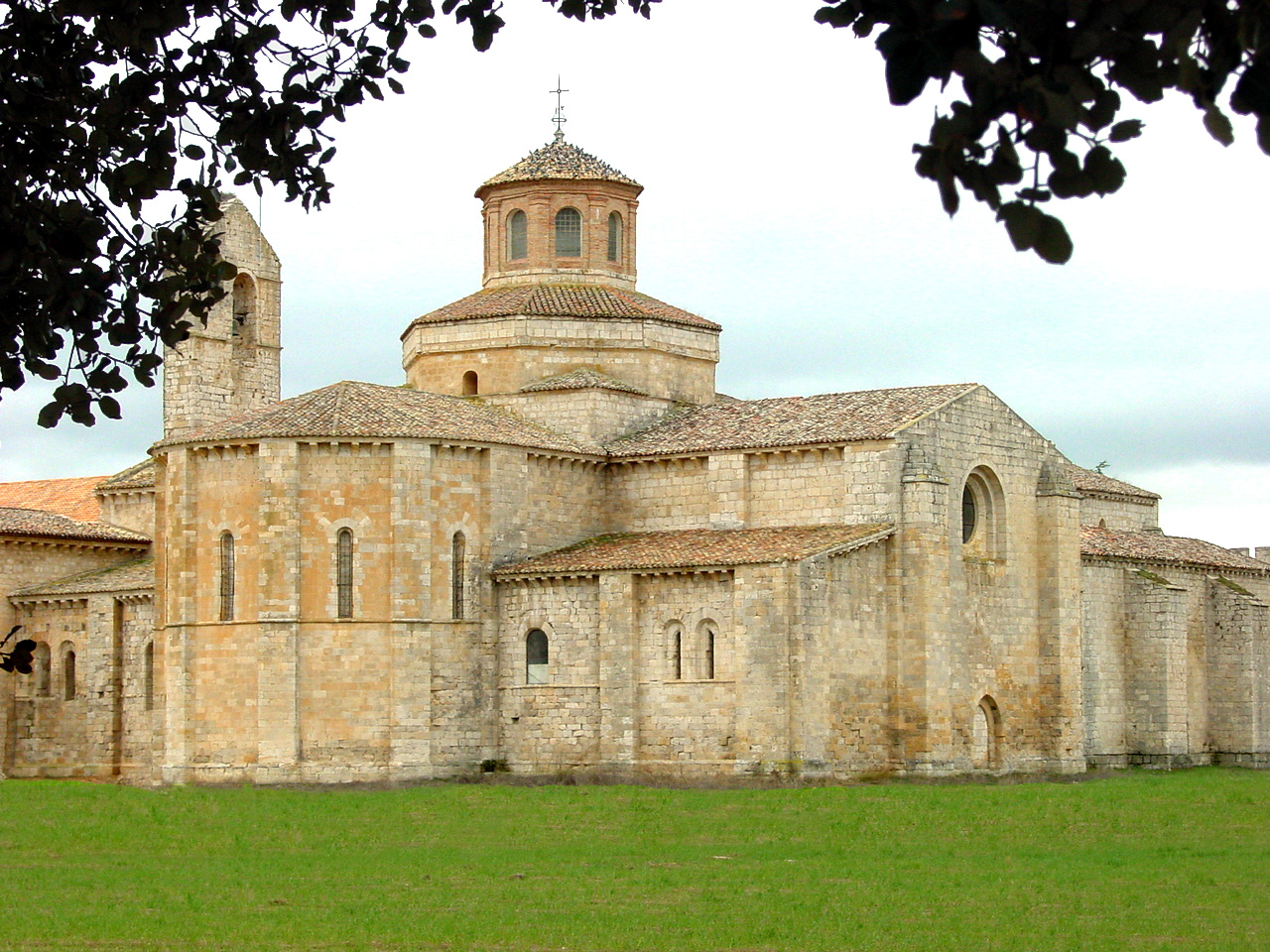
Monastery of Santa María de Valbuena.

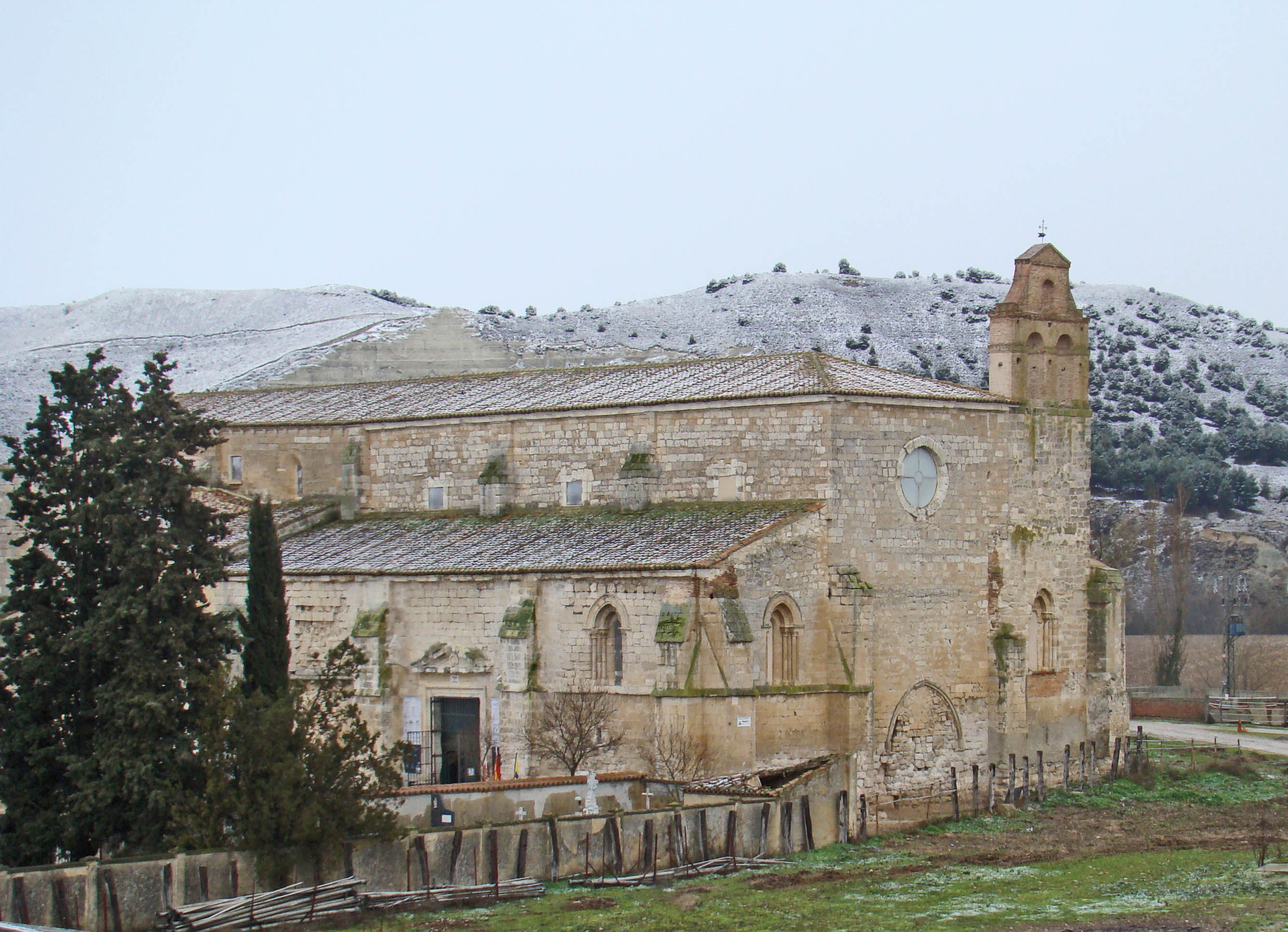
Monastery of Santa María de Palazuelos.

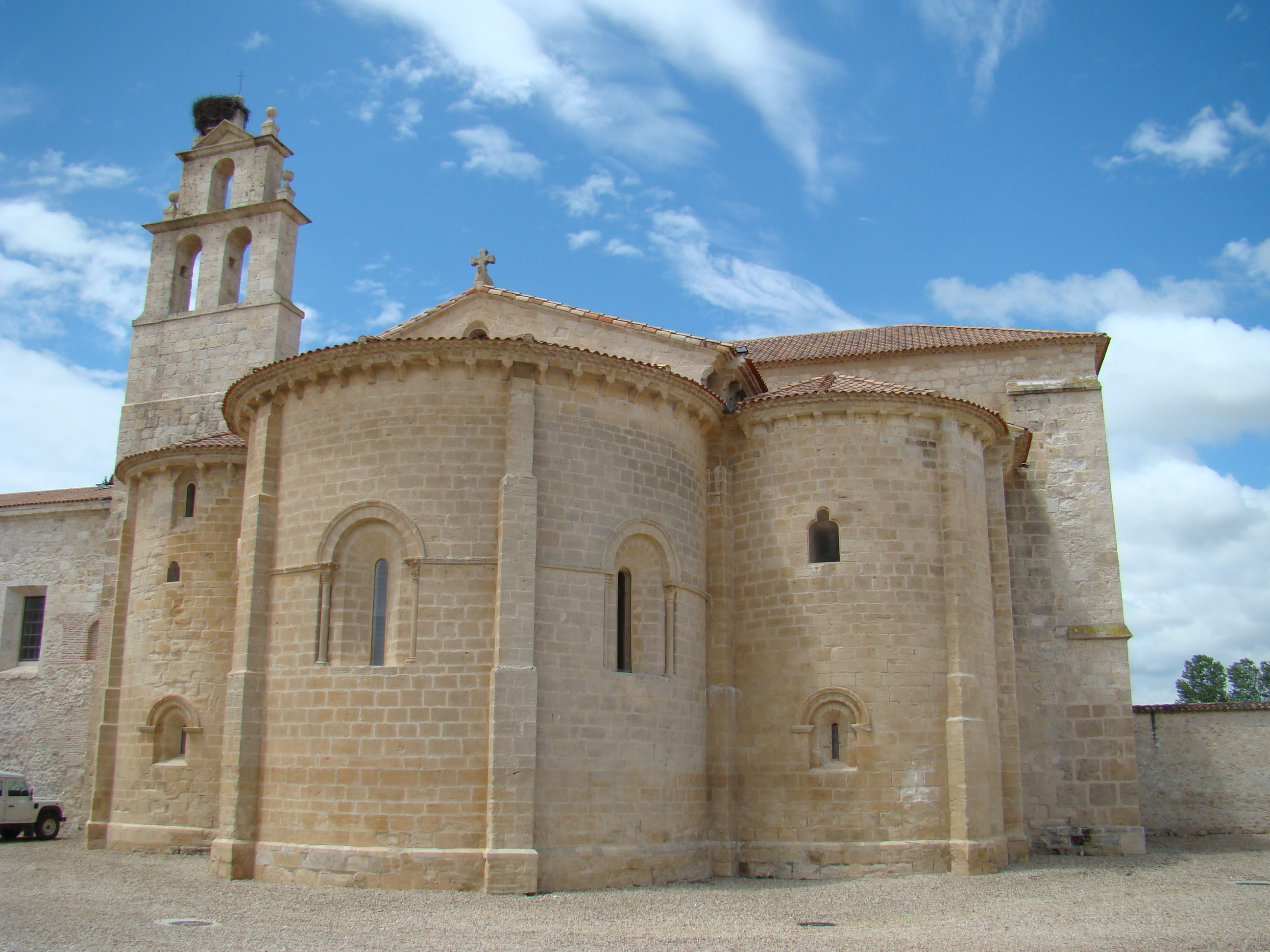
Monastery of Santa María de Retuerta.

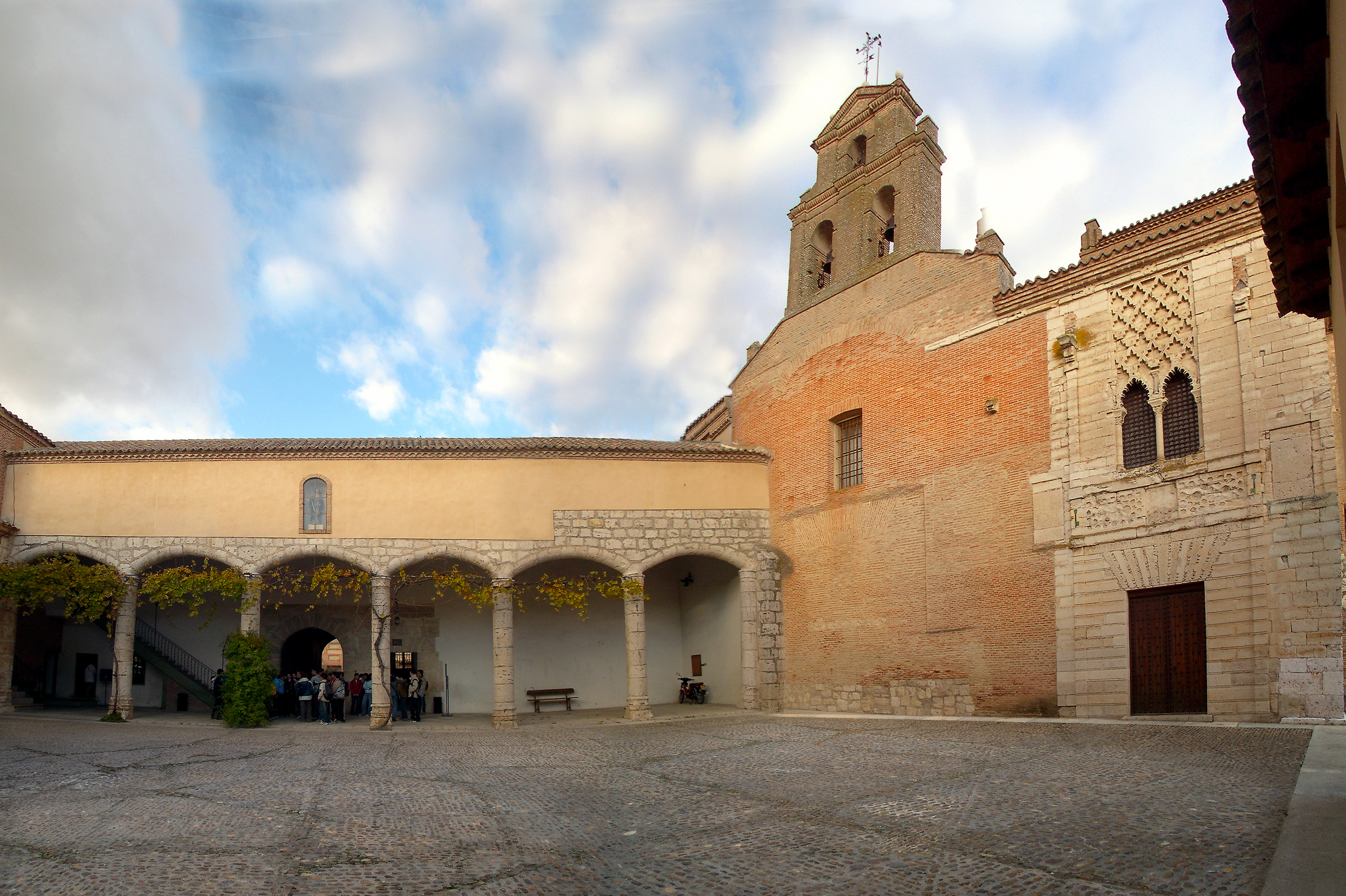
Monastery of Santa Clara.

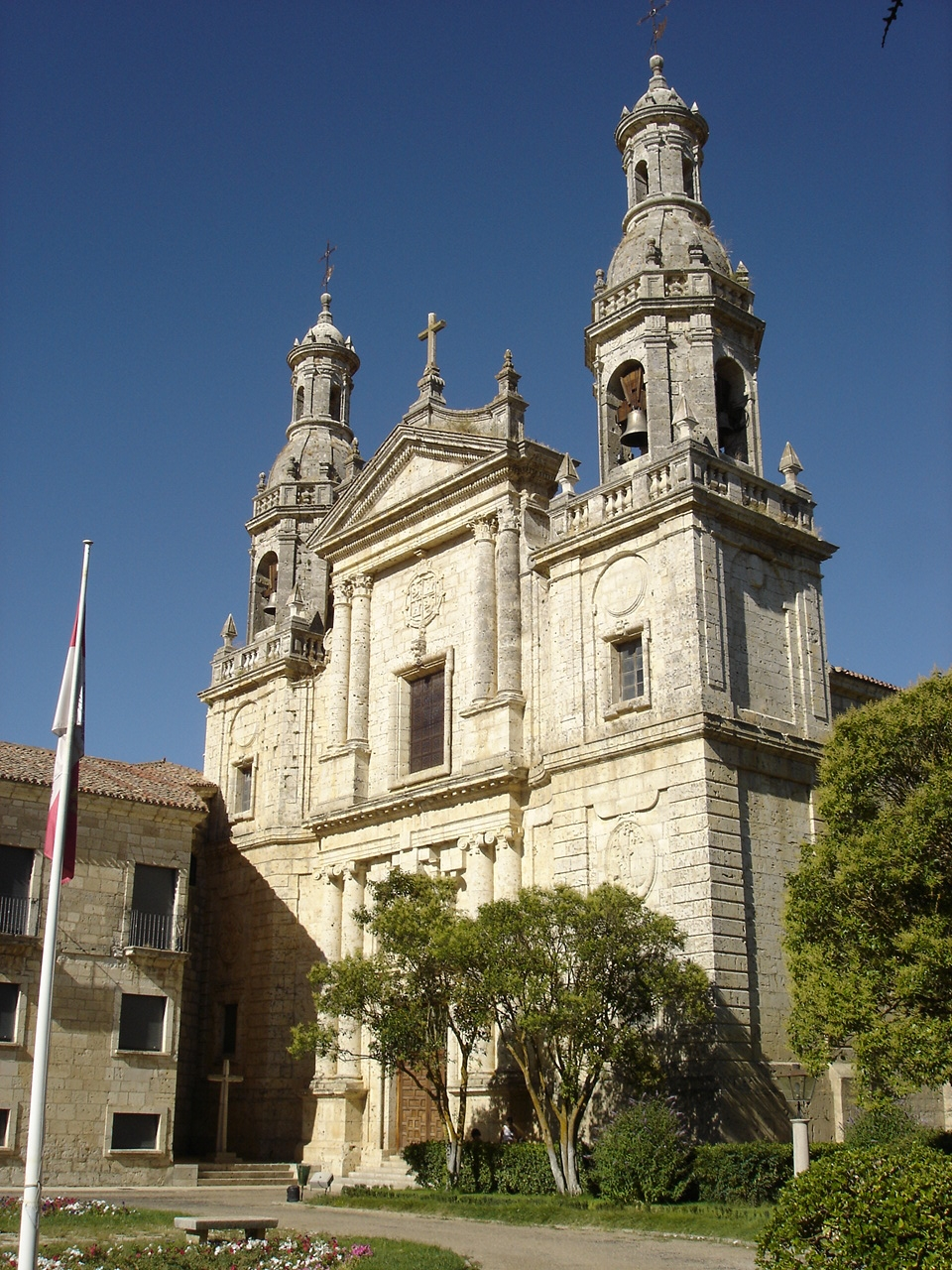
Monastery of Santa María de La Santa Espina.

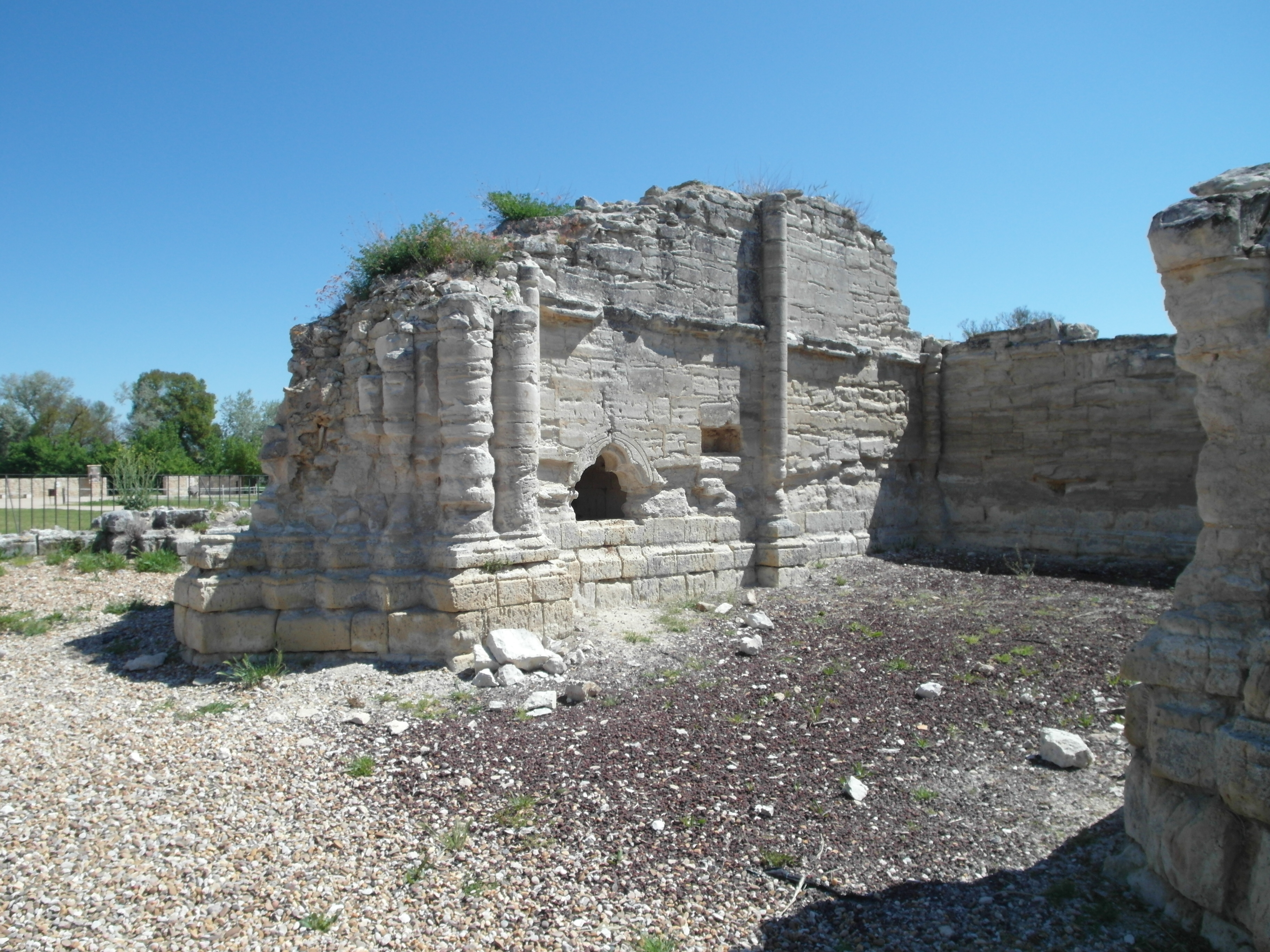
Monastery of Santa María de Matallana.

== Culture ==
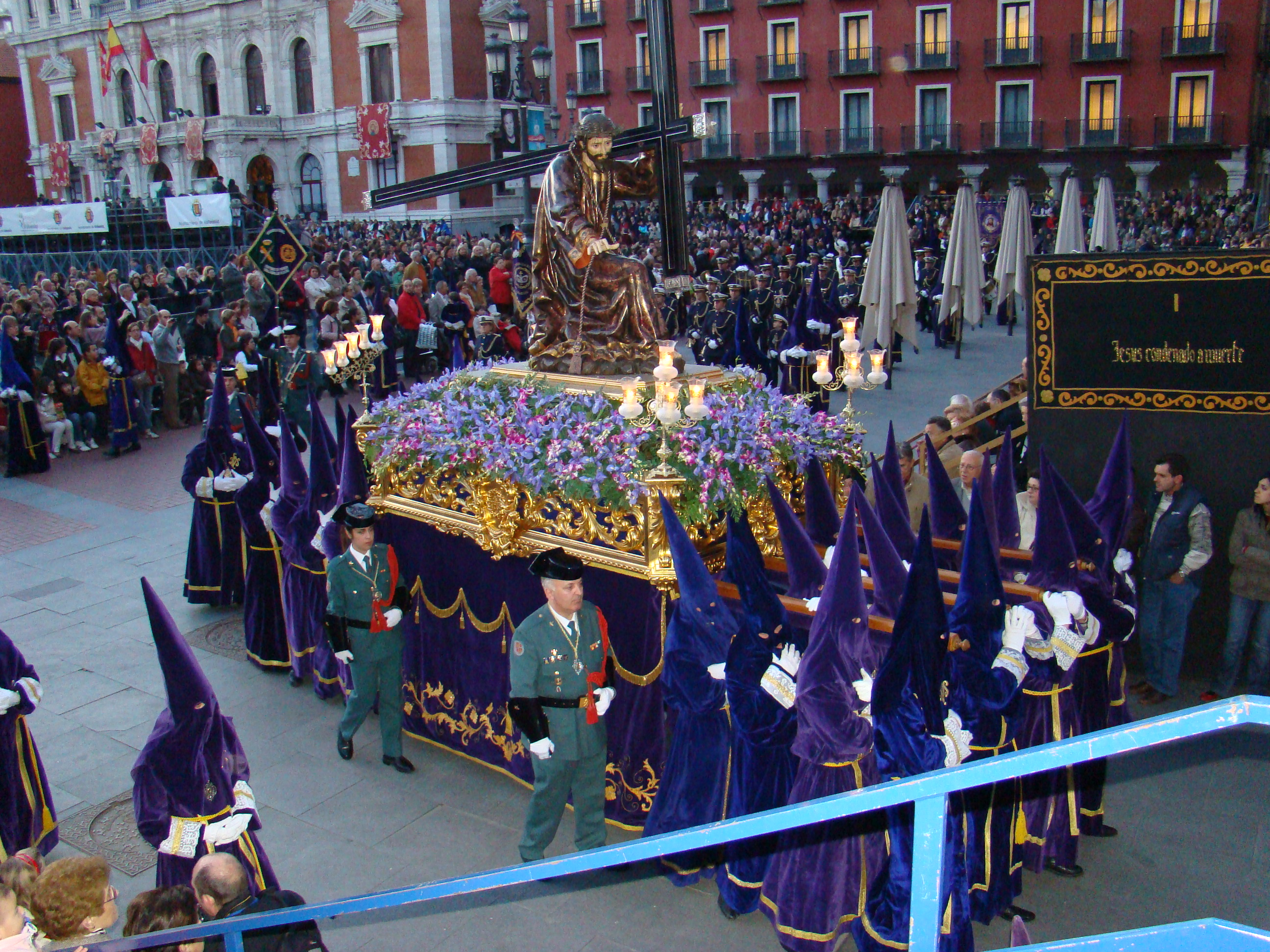
A Holy Week procession.

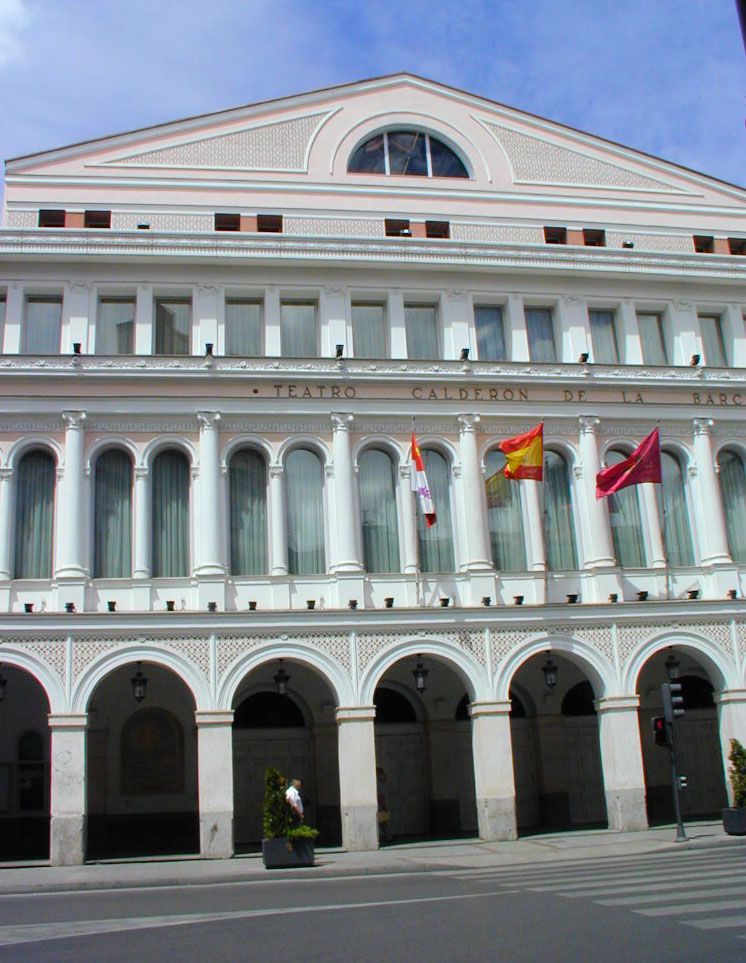
Calderón Theatre is the festival headquarters of Seminci.

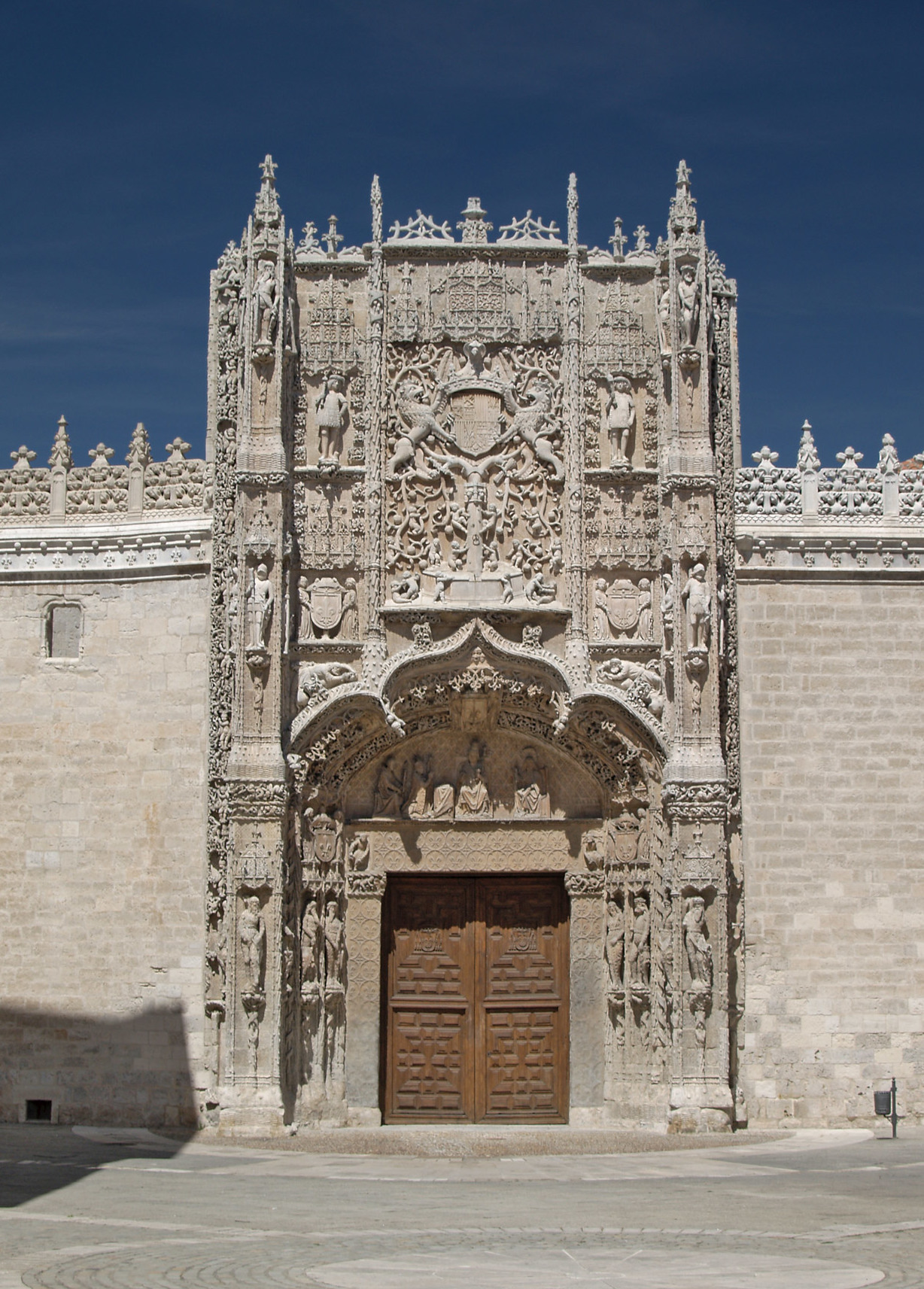
National Sculpture Museum.

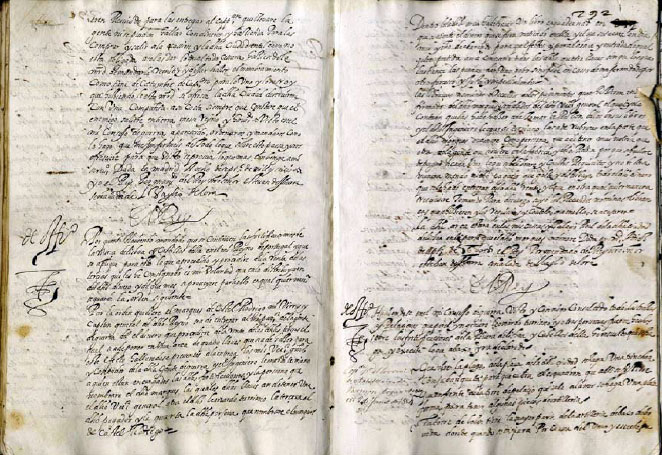
A document from the Archivo General de Simancas (General Archive of Simancas). UNESCO awarded the distinction of World Heritage Site within the Memory of the World Programme category to both this archive and the Treaty of Tordesillas.

The provincial government is developing a programme called "Cultural Travel" with the intention of bringing the rich history and cultural heritage of the province of Valladolid to the population of the province and all of Spain (including castles, palaces, churches, museums, and gastronomy). The province is one of the most advanced in terms of museums, hosting some of the most important in Castile and León and Spain.

Holy Week (Spanish: Semana Santa) is one of the best known Catholic traditions in the province. It is the annual commemoration of the Passion of Jesus Christ celebrated by Catholic brotherhoods and fraternities that perform penance processions on the streets of each city and town during the last week of Lent, immediately before Easter.

Easter is one of the most spectacular and emotional festivals in Valladolid. Religious devotion, art, colour and music combine in acts to commemorate the death of Jesus Christ: the processions. Members of the different Easter brotherhoods, dressed in their characteristic robes, parade through the streets carrying religious statues (pasos) to the sound of drums and music.

Seminci ("Valladolid International Film Festival") is a film festival held annually in Valladolid since 1956. It is one of their foremost (and oldest) film festivals. The festival has been characterised by its willingness to take risks in its programming. It has also been keen to examine critically each new school or movement as it has arisen, whether German, Polish, Chinese, Canadian or otherwise. With a concern for the art of cinema, film-making and film-makers rather than the commercial aspects of the industry, the festival has built an identity of its own.

The National Sculpture Museum holds more than 1,500 sculptures and 1,200 paintings from the Middle Ages until the beginning of the 19th century, as well as a number of high-quality paintings (Rubens, Zurbarán or Melendez, among others). The sculptural collection is the most important in the Iberian Peninsula and one of the most prominent European collections of this type.

The museum exhibits many national and European sculptures, as well as paintings ranging from the 13th to 19th centuries from the Iberian Peninsula and former territories linked to Spain (Latin America, Flanders and Italy). Painters such as Bononi, Rubens, Zurbarán, Ribalta and Melendez are present, but the centre of the collection corresponds to sculptures dating from the 15th to 17th centuries.

UNESCO awarded the World Heritage Site distinction within the Memory of the World Programme category to the Treaty of Tordesillas in 2007 and the Archivo General de Simancas in 2017.

=== Languages ===
Spanish is the only official language throughout the territory. Valladolid is notable for having been the residence of the author of Don Quixote, Miguel de Cervantes, as well as authors such as José Zorrilla and Miguel Delibes, and for the influence of its University. The province receives a significant number of people eager to learn the Spanish language (language tourism).

Some outstanding personalities from Valladolid in the field of literature in the Spanish language are:

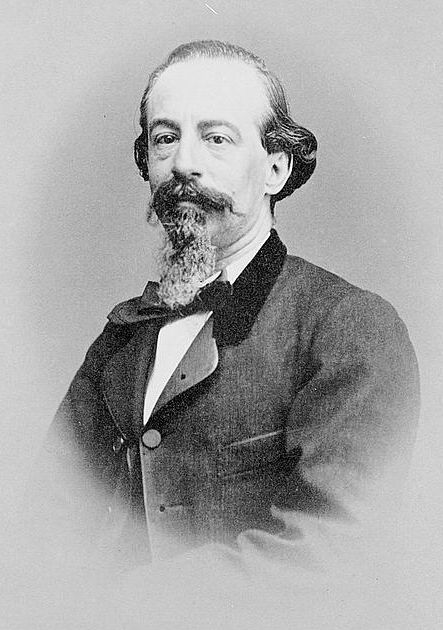
José Zorrilla

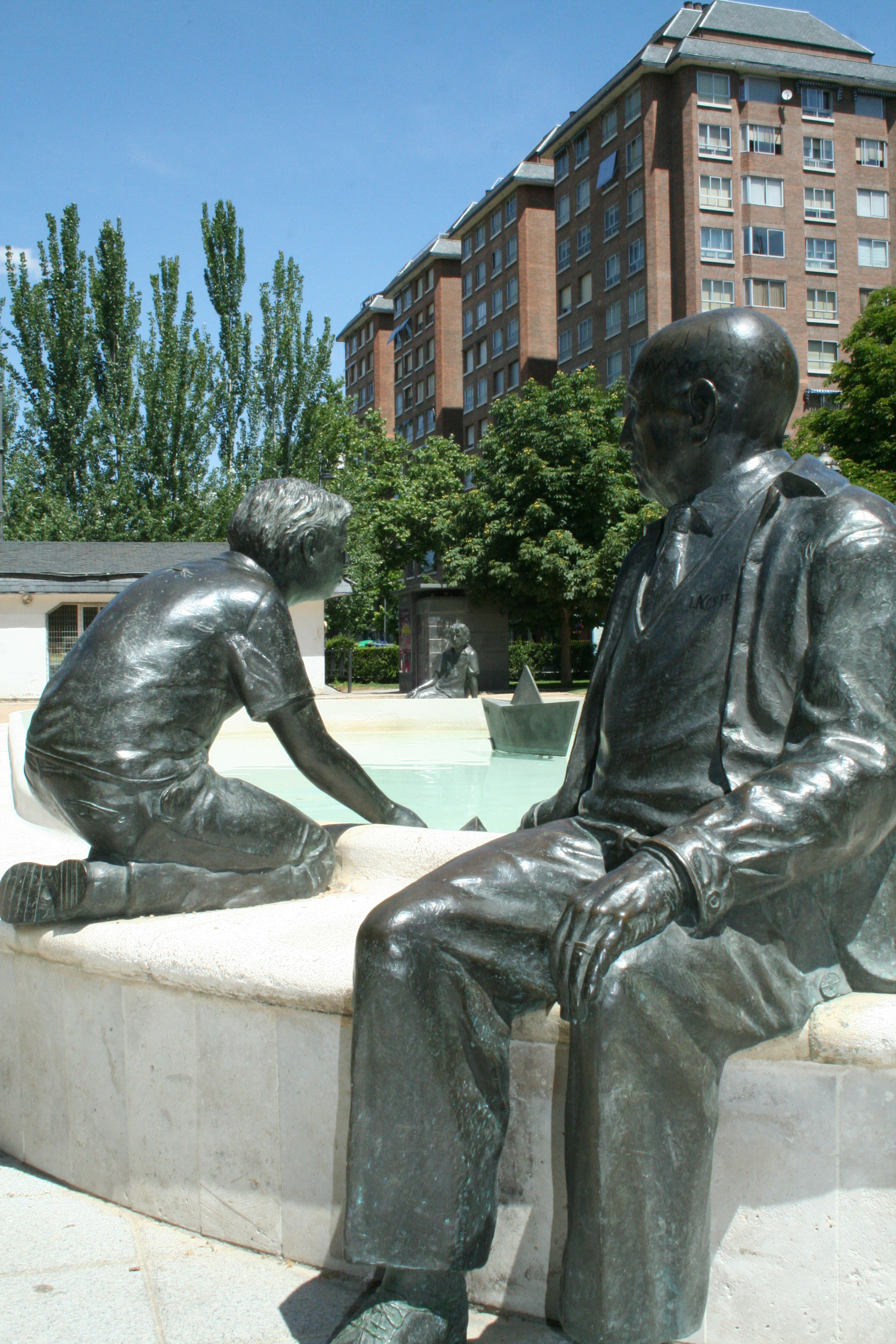
Jorge Guillén

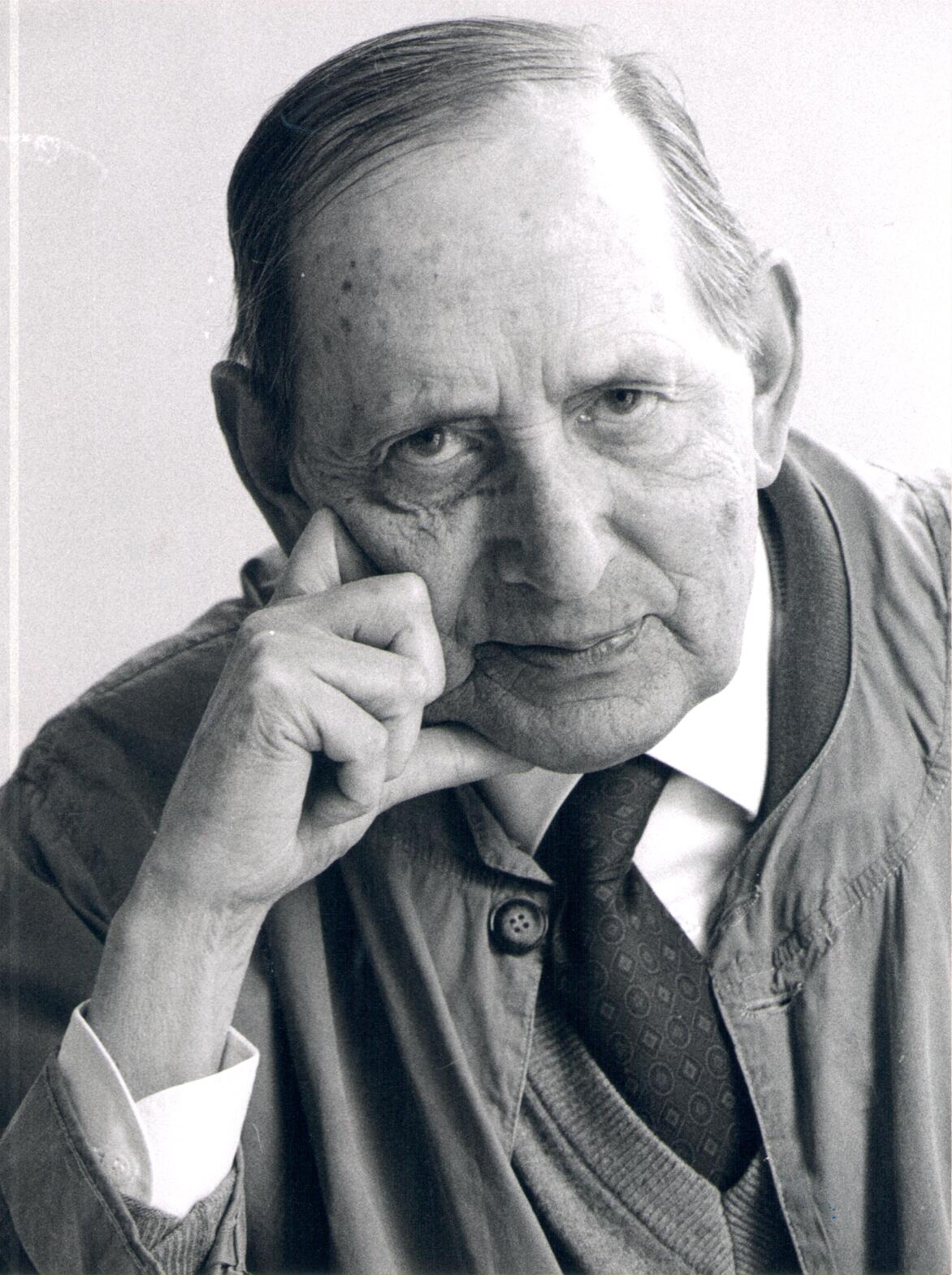
Miguel Delibes

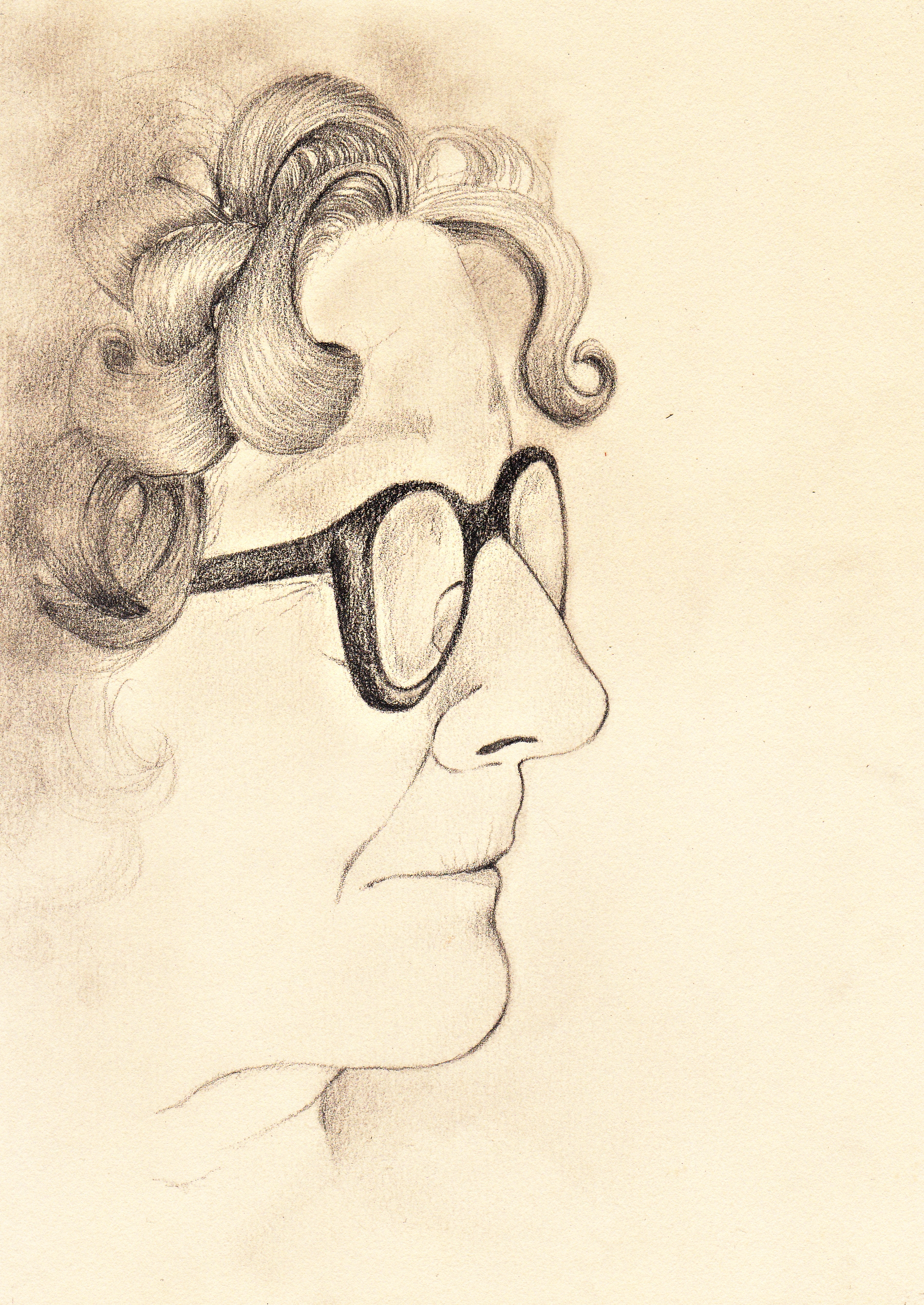
Rosa Chacel

=== Cuisine ===
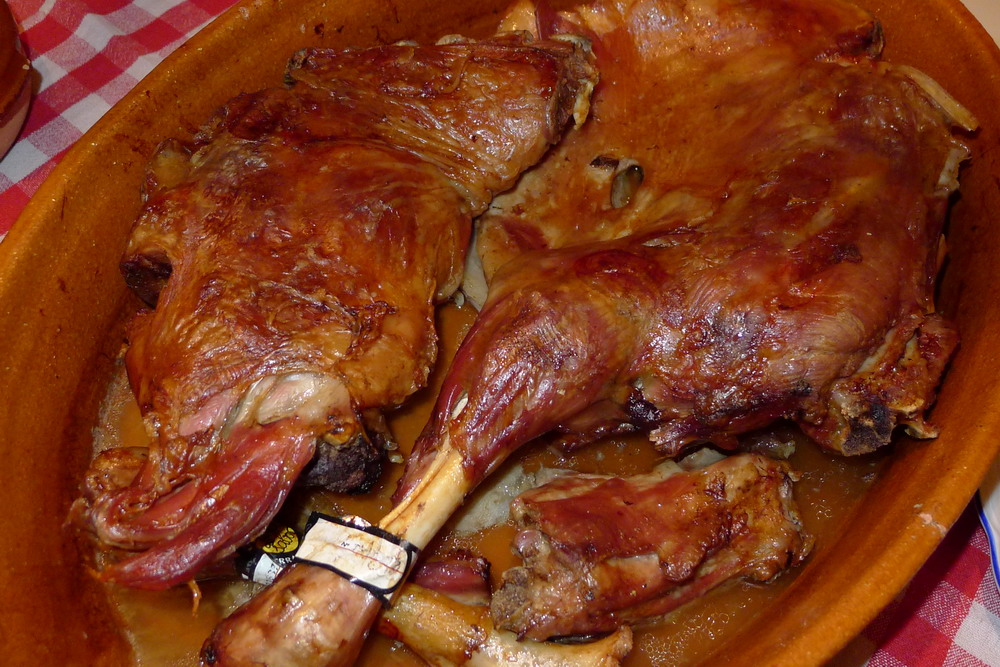
Roast lechazo is a very typical dish from the province, as well as others such as roast suckling pig.

The gastronomy of the Valladolid province is typically Spanish, although each area presents a different picture. In the northern area of the province, especially in the region of Tierra de Campos ("Land of Fields"), traditional sheep's cheese is made, among which is the cheese of Villalón de Campos, fresh or cured; it is a cheese also known as pata de mulo ("mule's leg"). Also common are garlic soup, stew developed slowly over a fire, lentils stewed elaborately with the Pardina variety from Tierra de Campos, and pigeon or squab prepared with different techniques. Among the typical cakes are the rolls of the Virgin of the Sources (rollos de la Virgen de las Fuentes) in Villalón de Campos, rosquillas de palo (stick doughnuts), aceitadas, oil cakes and greaves. In Medina de Rioseco one can taste traditional sugared almonds or marinas, puff pastry filled with cream and covered with sugar.

==== Wine ====
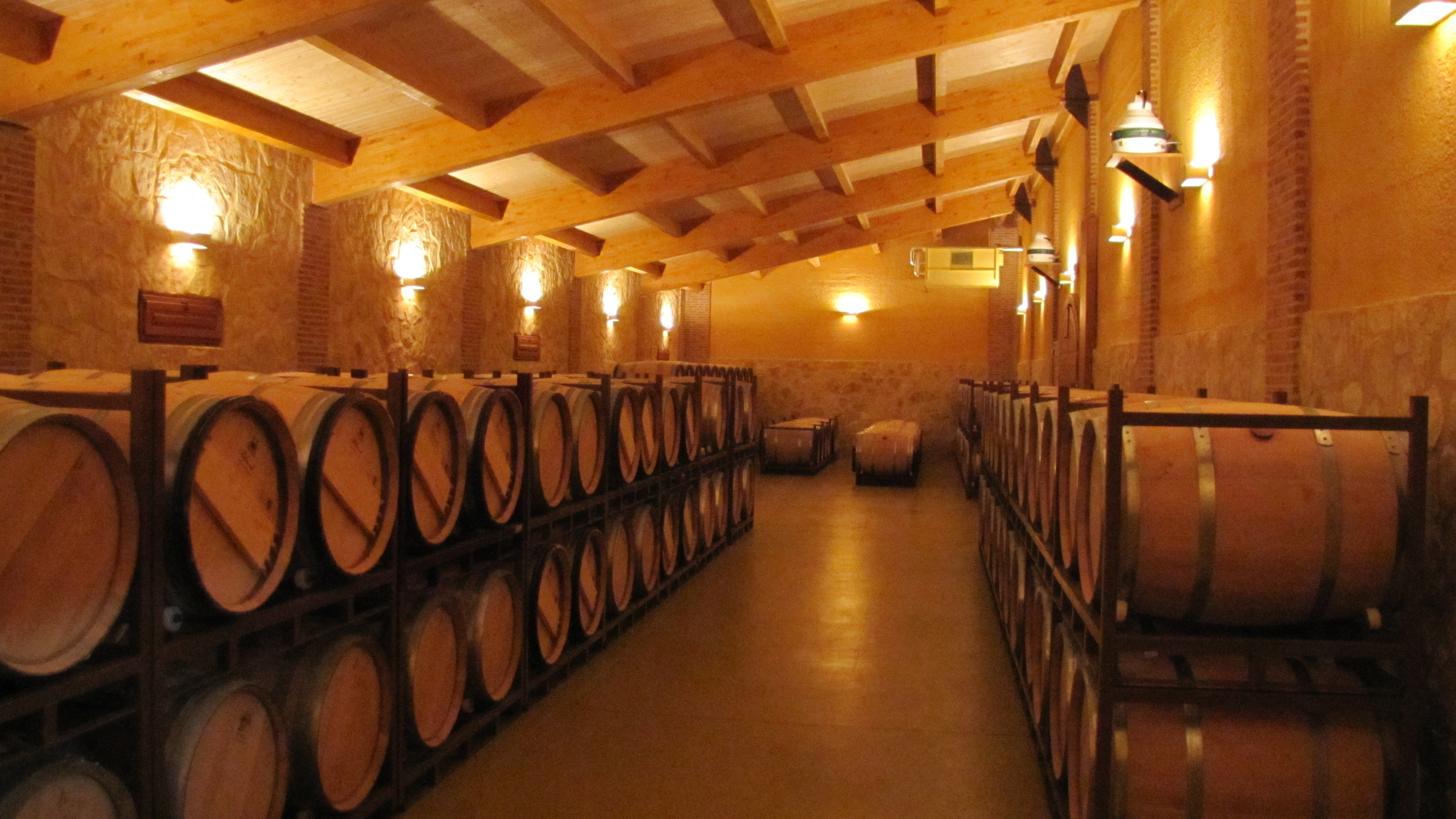
Barrels of a winery with the Ribera del Duero protected designation of origin.

Wines from the province of Valladolid are among the best in the world due to their taste and quality. An example of the fame of these wines is the Vega Sicilia winery. The province has five wines with a Denomination of Origin. Wines of Rueda Denomination of Origin were considered the wines of the court at the time of the Catholic Monarchs. The Verdejo grape variety is used for its production, and to a lesser extent, Sauvignon blanc. Under this appellation, there are white, sparkling, red, rosé and liqueur wines.

Wines of Ribera del Duero are made with the Tinta del País (Tempranillo) grape, and produce young red wines, Reserva and Gran Reserva. Wines of the Toro Designation of Origin are mainly white, rosé and red; the wines of Tierra de León Denomination of Origin are white, rosé and red; and finally, there are the rosé wines of the Cigales Denomination of Origin.

Cigales Denomination of Origin

Ribera del Duero

Rueda Denomination of Origin

Toro Designation of Origin

Tierra de León Denomination of Origin

=== Meat ===
The province is also famous for its meats, mainly lechazo (veal or lamb), suckling pig, steaks, chops, veal ribs, pork ribs, black pudding, and embutidos. There are numerous restaurants that specialize in lechazo and feature hornos de leña (wood-fired ovens), in which the lamb is roasted. The typical restaurant where the meat is traditionally cooked is called a mesón castellano (Castilian tavern).

==== Bread ====
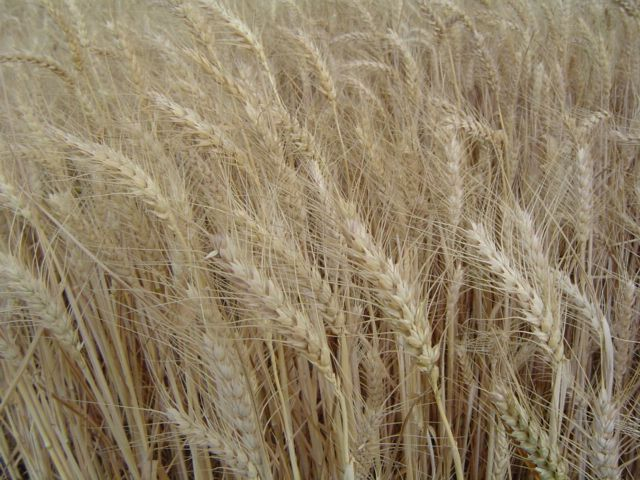
Variety of Durum wheat (Triticum aestivum). Due to the climate, the predominant crop is dryland farming (barley, wheat, oats, rye...).

Bread made in the province of Valladolid has a great tradition that goes back to the ninth century (see also: History of bread). Holy Roman Emperor Charles V, during his retreat in the monastery of Yuste, had bread brought from Valladolid; during the 16th century the master bakers were financially supported by the Crown.

The typically Castilian bread is named "Candeal bread", "sobao o bregado" ("kneaded" or "labored"), because since remote times in Castile the wheat variety most used is durum. It has a thin, lightly toasted crust, and a very white, compact crumb with a fine texture and distinctive flavour. This type of bread is suitable to accompany red meats, stews or legumes accompanied by wines from the province. Traditionally it is made by hand, with slow fermentation and prolonged baking in a wood-fired oven.

Different varieties fall under this denomination; the most prominent is the "lechuguino bread" variety, characterized by its typical pattern and care that gives the name to the variety, since formerly, especially in rural areas, "lechuguino" referred to people who were overly dressed up.

Other varieties are the typical four-cornered bread (pan de cuatro canteros), with a characteristic splitting of the dough where the central part is separated from the four edges; the checkered bread (pan de cuadros); the pulley bread (pan de polea), with a slit made with a string that imitates a pulley; the white bar or peaks; and the Fabiola, created in 1961 by a baker from Valladolid in honour of Queen Fabiola of Belgium.

Other types not so traditional in the province but widely consumed in the area are the rustic bar and the barra rica (rich bar).

=== Sports ===
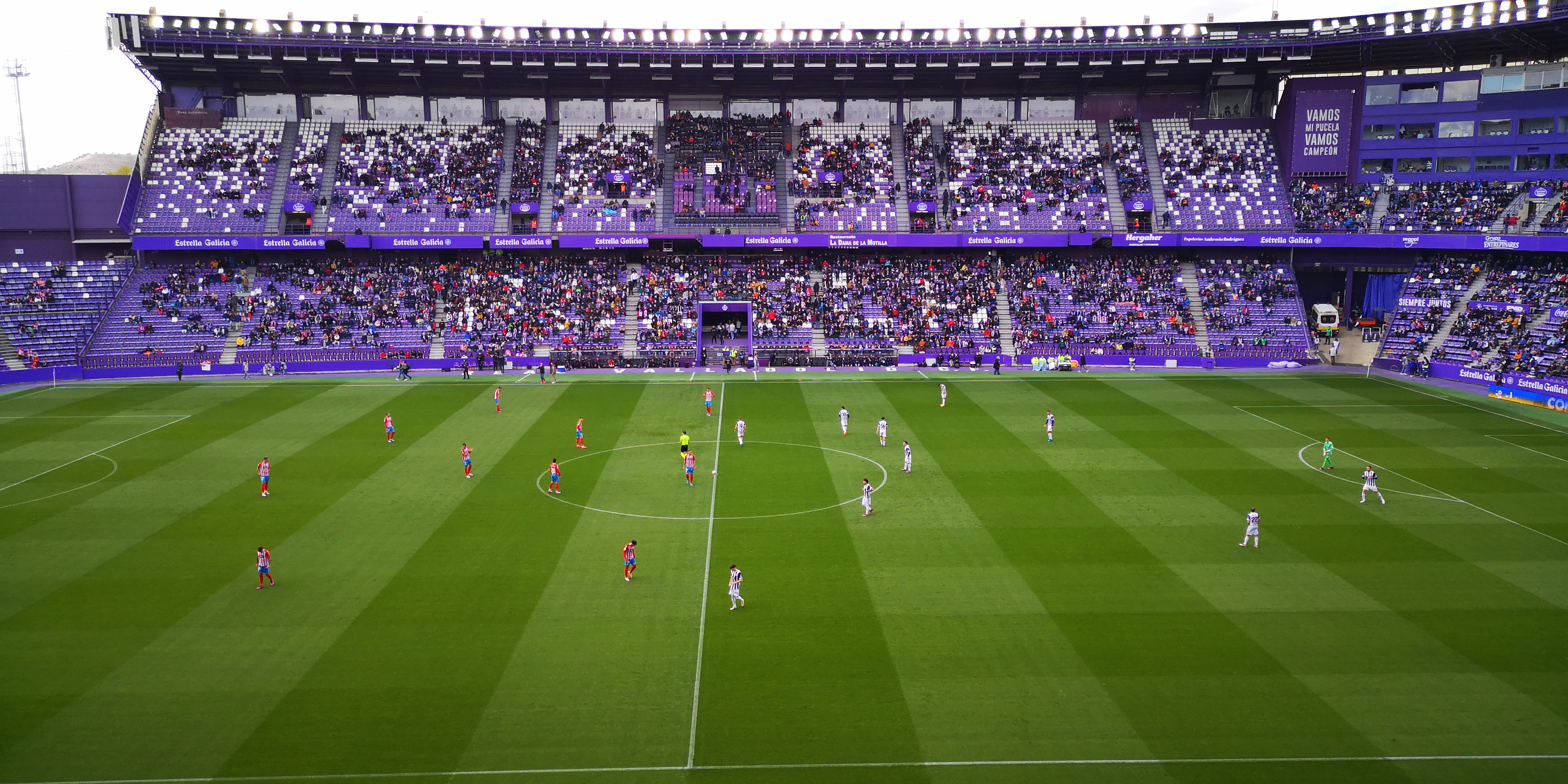
Real Valladolid plays as the home team in the José Zorrilla Stadium.

Valladolid has professional teams in four sports: football (soccer), basketball, handball and rugby. In football, Real Valladolid is a historic team of the Spanish La Liga. In basketball, CB Ciudad de Valladolid replaces the original CB Valladolid (which featured players such as Arvydas Sabonis, Oscar Schmidt, John Williams, Ed O'Bannon and Panagiotis Vasilopoulos) following the older team's bankruptcy. In handball, BM Atlético Valladolid replaced BM Valladolid (winner of two King's Cups, one ASOBAL Cup and one EHF Cup Winners' Cup). There is also a women's handball team, BM Aula Cultural. Valladolid is also known as a national centre for rugby, with two of the top teams of the División de Honor de Rugby league: CR El Salvador and Valladolid RAC, which between them have won twenty-three National League Championships, fifteen King's Cups and sixteen Spanish Supercups.

== Economy ==
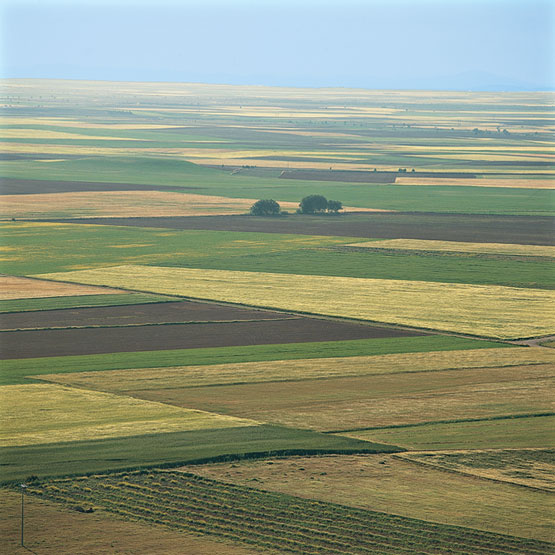
Cultivated fields (Open field system).

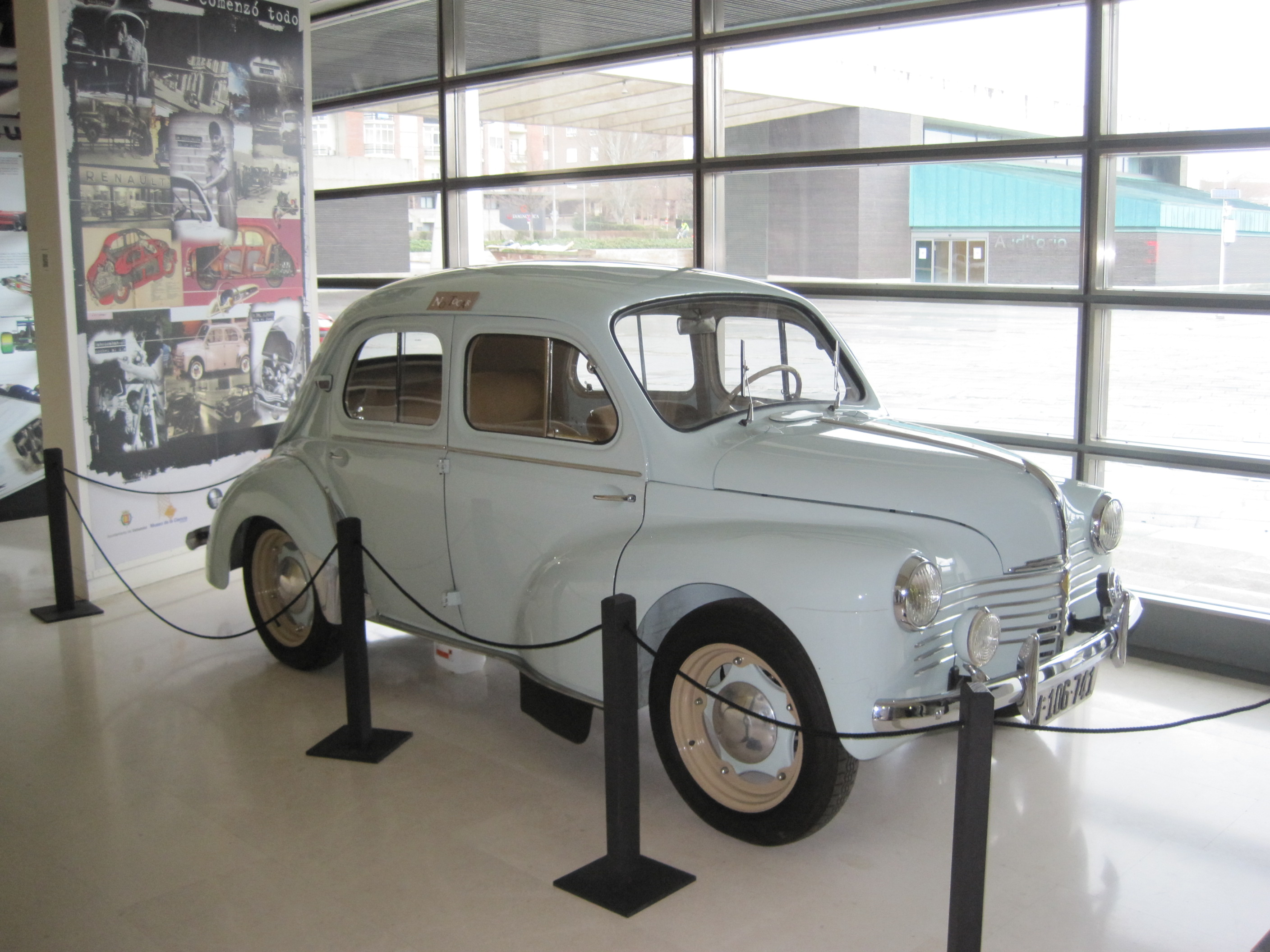
The first Renault 4CV car manufactured by FASA-Renault at the factory in Valladolid. The factory opened in 1951, resulting in sharp industrial growth.

The GDP per capita of the province was €24,751 per year in 2010 (approximately $32,176). The province's GDP per capita was 109% of the national average. The total GDP of the province amounted to €13,000,403,000 (approximately $16.9 billion).

Agriculture is dedicated to the cultivation of cereals (wheat and barley), legumes, sugar beets, alfalfa, vegetables, and vines. Livestock farming is also important. Intense industrial activity, especially concentrated in the capital, is derived from agriculture (pasta, flour, chocolate, sugar, etc.), textiles, metallurgy, automobile manufacturing (FASA-Renault), chemicals, construction, paper, and graphic arts. In addition to the capital city Valladolid, the populations of Medina del Campo, Peñafiel, Tordesillas, Tudela de Duero, Laguna de Duero, Íscar, Olmedo and Pedrajas de San Esteban (the last due to its large production of pine nuts) are notable.

The top 10 companies by economic turnover in 2013 were: Renault-España, Michelin, Iveco, El Árbol, Aquagest (Grupo Agbar), Lauki (Lactalis), Begar, ACOR, Grupo Norte and Queserías Entrepinares.

=== Energy ===
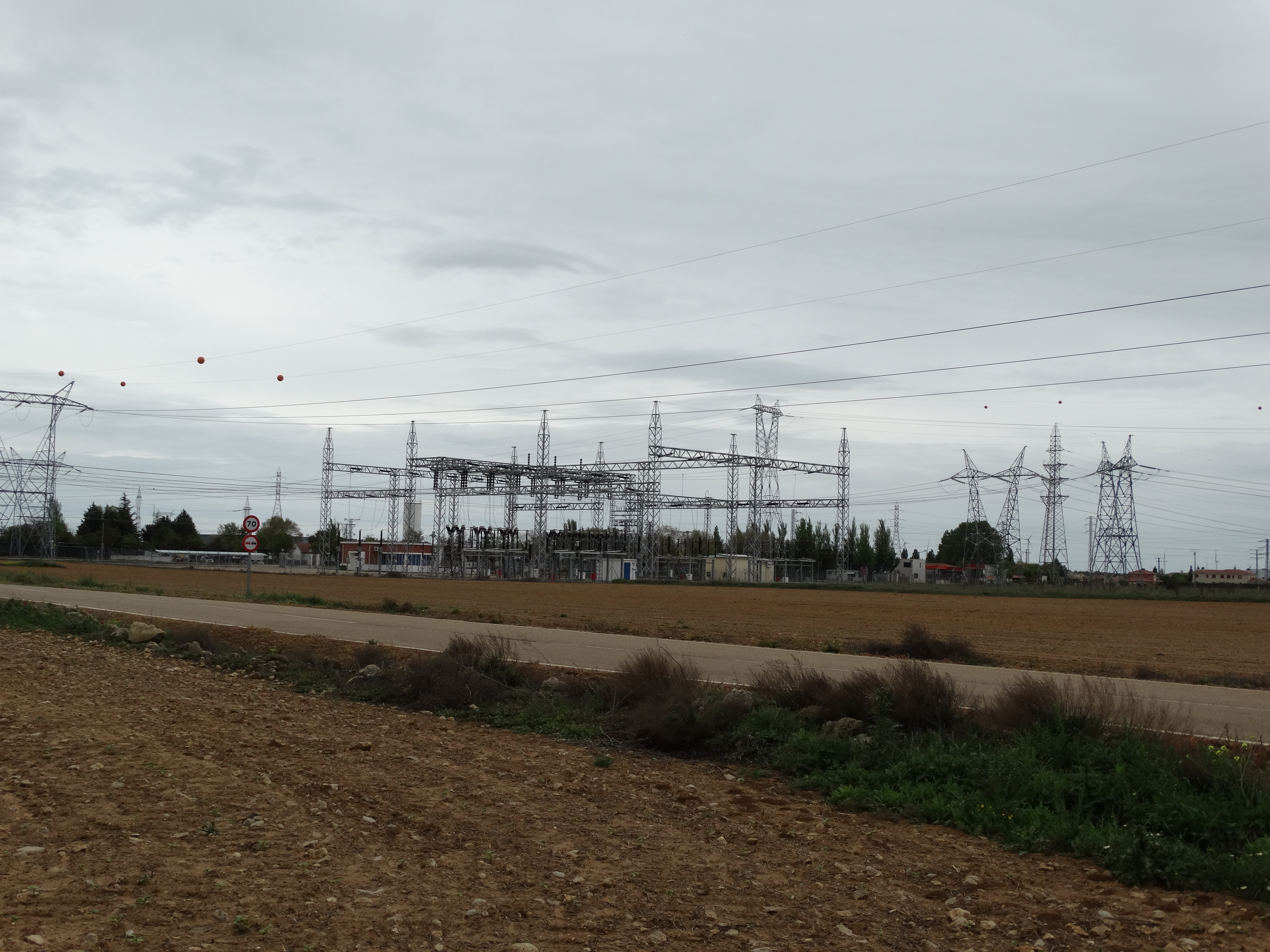
Electrical substation of La Mudarra.

Unlike other provinces in Castile and León, such as Burgos and León, the province of Valladolid does not have large nuclear, thermal, or hydroelectric power plants. This is due, among other reasons, to the absence of mountain ranges and valleys that could favor the construction of reservoirs for energy production. In La Mudarra, there is an electrical substation, owned by Red Eléctrica de España, which distributes electricity throughout northwestern Spain.

==== Hydroelectric Power Plants ====
| Image | Name | Municipality | County | Type | Power | Owner | Location |
| | San José Hydroelectric Power Plant | Castronuño | Land of Wine | Kaplan turbine | 20,000 MWh (2'28 MW) | Iberdrola | 41°24′14″N 5°16′24″W |

==== Wind farms ====
The following link shows the 25 wind farms in the province of Valladolid (as of November 2025): Wind farms on Castile and León (Spanish)

==== Photovoltaic parks ====
As of 31 December 2024, there were 1,350 photovoltaic installations in the province of Valladolid generating 709,174 kW, including 122 installations producing more than 500 kW. The data can be consulted at the following link: Photovoltaic parks on Castile and León (Spanish)

=== Transport ===
The province of Valladolid has great strategic importance as a communications hub. Nationally, it is the route that connects Madrid with the entire north of Spain, from Vigo (Galicia) to San Sebastián (Basque Country). Internationally, it lies on the shortest land route connecting Portugal with France, from northern Portugal (Porto) to southern France (Hendaye).

==== Roads ====
Motorways and autovías
| Name | From/Until | Important towns of Valladolid where it passes |
|---|---|---|
| Autovía del Noroeste | Madrid–A Coruña | Medina del Campo, Rueda, Tordesillas, Urueña |
| Autovía de Castilla | Burgos–Portugal | Cabezón de Pisuerga, Cigales, Valladolid, Simancas, Tordesillas, Alaejos |
| Autovía del Duero | Soria–Zamora | Peñafiel, Quintanilla de Onésimo, Tudela de Duero, Valladolid, Tordesillas |
| Autovía Valladolid-León | Valladolid–León | Valladolid, Medina de Rioseco, Mayorga |
| Autovía de Pinares | Valladolid–Segovia | Valladolid, Boecillo, Portillo, Aldeamayor de San Martín |
| VA-11 | Valladolid–Tudela de Duero | Valladolid, Tudela de Duero |
| VA-12 | Valladolid–Boecillo | Valladolid, Laguna de Duero, Boecillo |
| VA-20 | Valladolid–Arroyo de la Encomienda | Valladolid, Arroyo de la Encomienda |
| VA-30 | Cabezón de Pisuerga–Arroyo de la Encomienda | Cabezón de Pisuerga, Santovenia de Pisuerga, Renedo de Esgueva, Valladolid, Arroyo de la Encomienda |

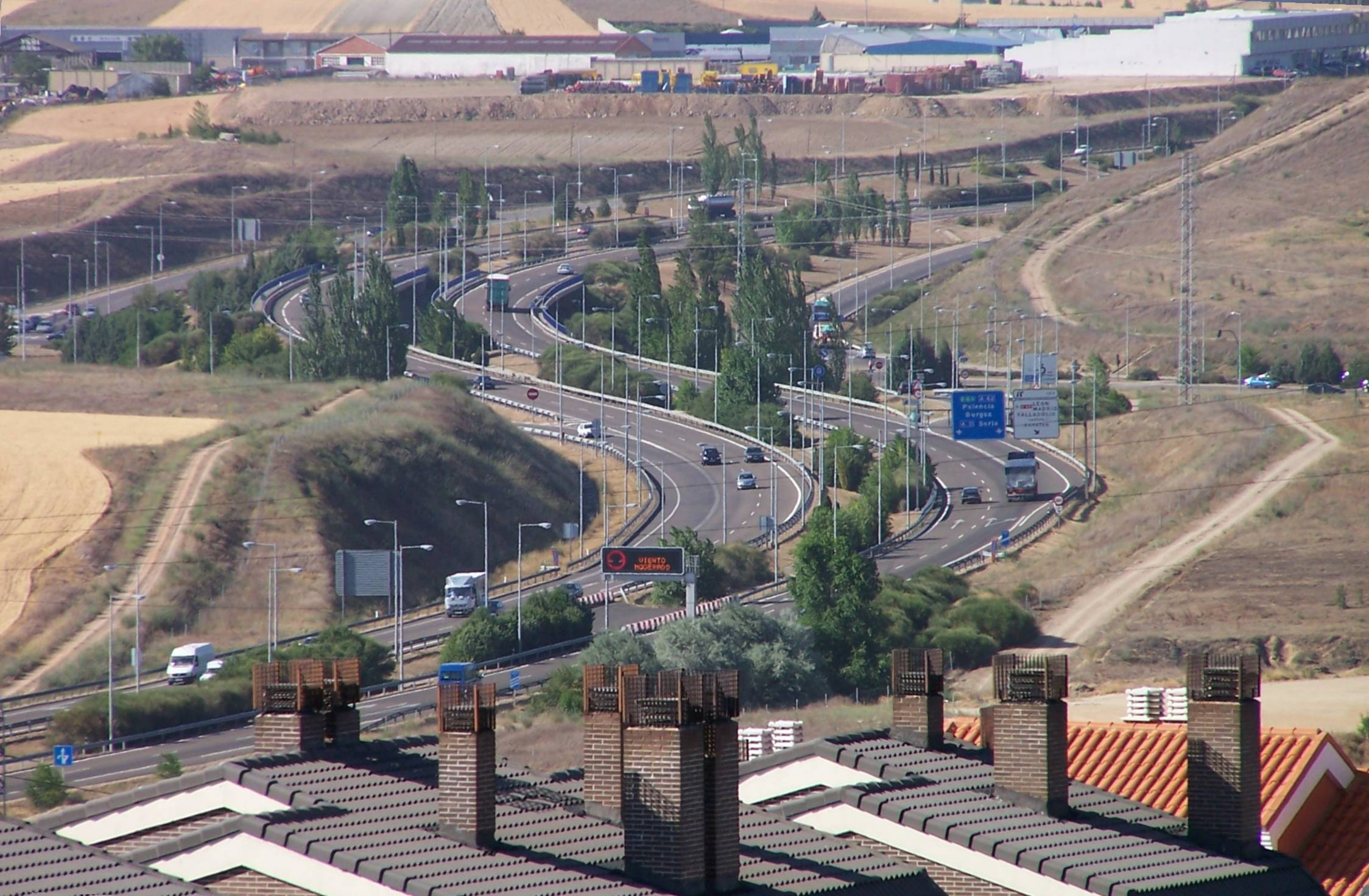
Autovía de Castilla.

National roads
| Name | From/Until | Important towns of Valladolid where it passes |
|---|---|---|
| N-VI | Madrid–A Coruña | Medina del Campo, Rueda, Tordesillas, Mota del Marqués, Villardefrades |
| N-122 | Zaragoza–Portugal | Peñafiel, Quintanilla de Arriba, Quintanilla de Onésimo, Tudela de Duero, Valladolid, Tordesillas |
| N-601 | Madrid–León | Olmedo, Mojados, Laguna de Duero, Valladolid, Medina de Rioseco, Mayorga |
| N-620 | Burgos–Portugal | Valladolid, Tordesillas, Alaejos |

European roads
| Name | From/Until | Important towns of Valladolid where it passes |
|---|---|---|
| E-80 | Lisbon–Gürbulak | Valladolid, Tordesillas, Alaejos |
| E-82 | Tordesillas–Porto | Tordesillas |

==== Railways ====
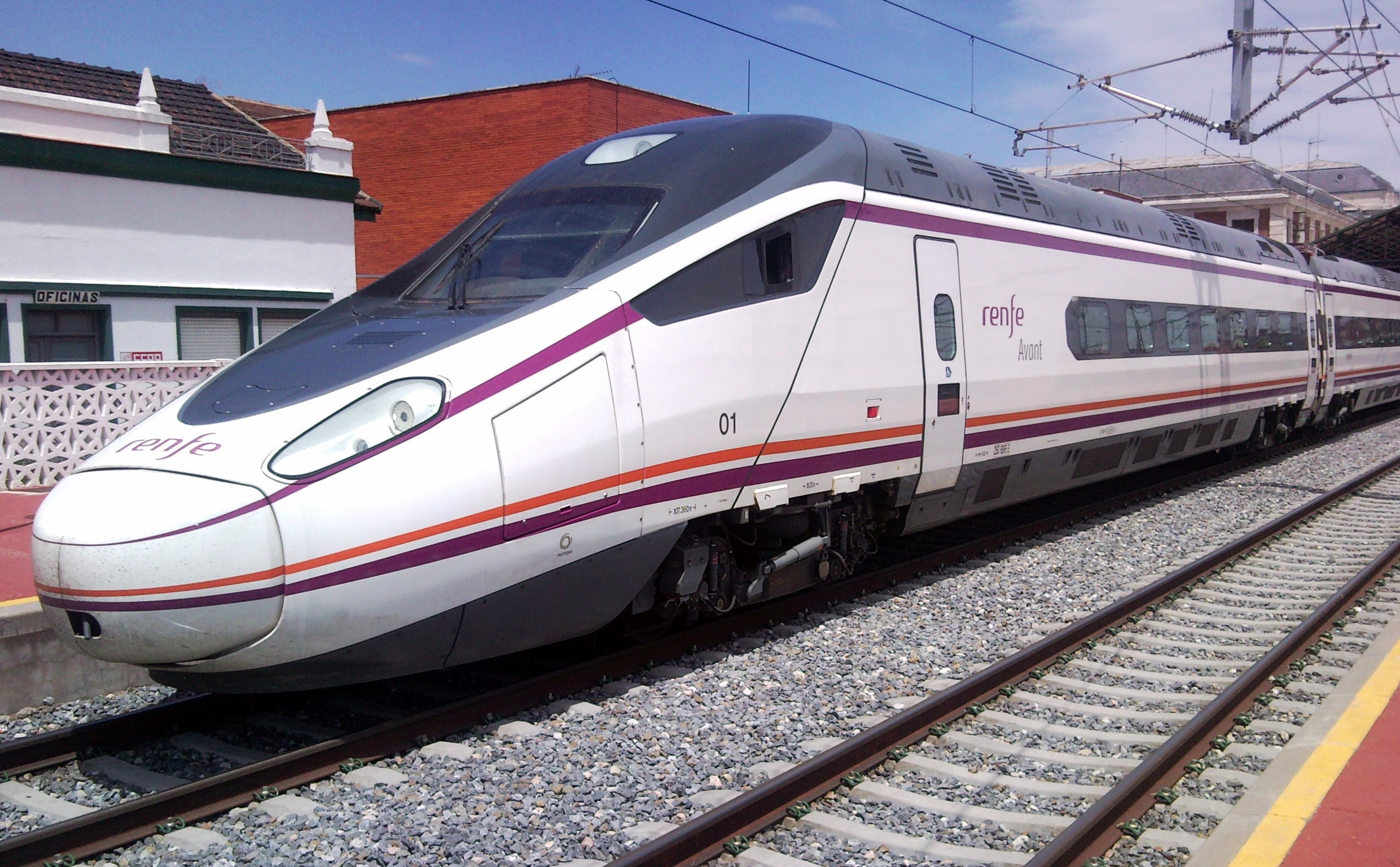
Train of the Renfe (AVE) Class 114 in Valladolid-Campo Grande railway station.

The AVE (Spanish High Speed) network in the province of Valladolid includes stops in the towns of Valladolid, Olmedo, and Medina del Campo. These are part of the following lines: the Madrid–Valladolid high-speed rail line, the Madrid–León high-speed rail line, and the Madrid–Galicia high-speed rail line. A "bypass" near Olmedo is under construction; it will connect the Madrid–Valladolid line with the Madrid–Galicia line.

The future Atlantic Corridor (CORR 7), part of the basic Trans-European Transport Network (TEN-T), will serve as a passenger and freight rail corridor connecting the ports of the Atlantic coast with the interior and the rest of Europe. It is scheduled for completion before 2031.

The publicly owned railway company Renfe operates long-distance and high-speed rail services (AVE, Avant and Talgo).

==== Airports ====
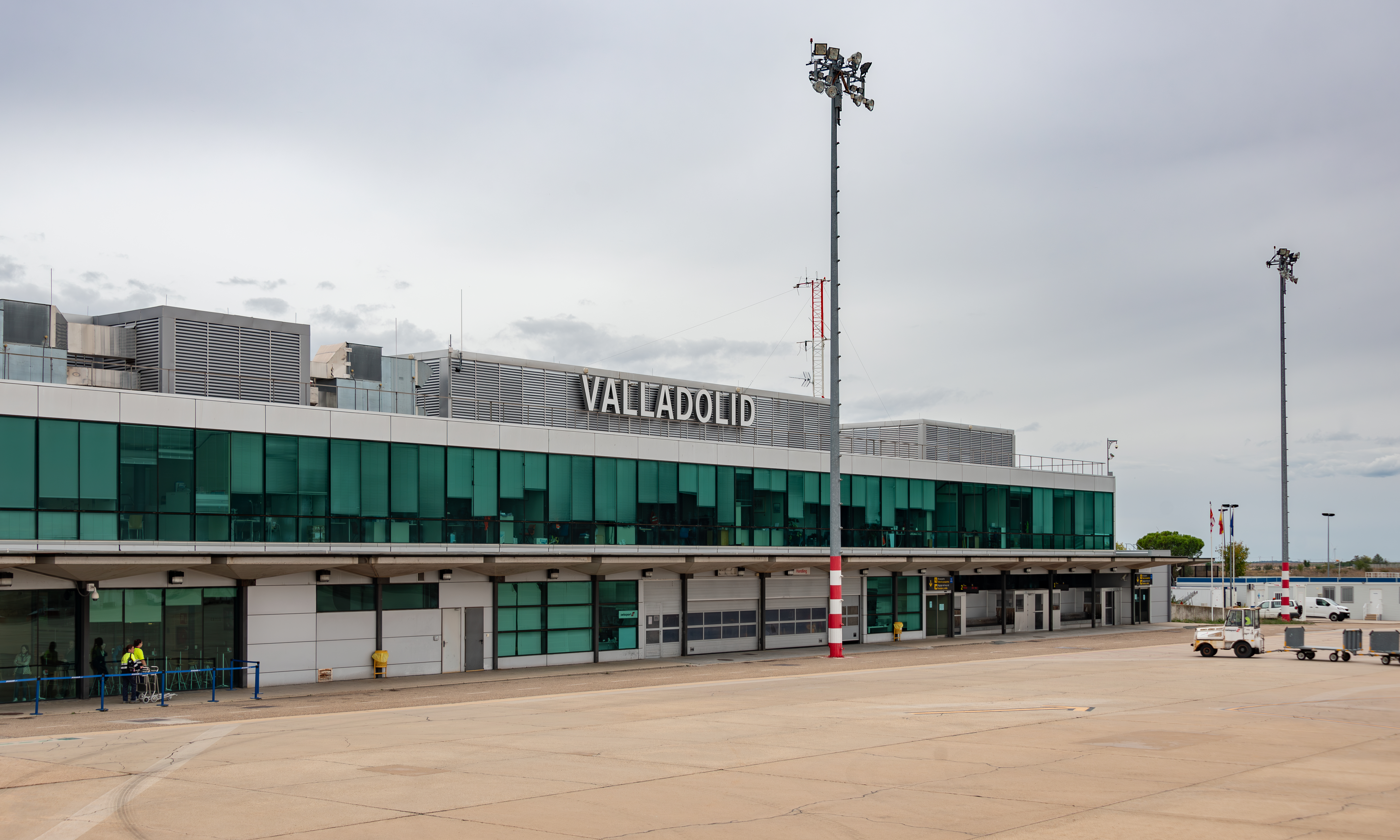
Valladolid Airport terminal.

The province has one airport, Valladolid Airport, located in Villanubla. It handled 172,006 passengers, 7,268 aircraft movements, and 6,317 tonnes of cargo in 2022. It serves as a key passenger hub for Castile and León, linking to destinations such as Alicante, Barcelona, Palma de Mallorca, Ibiza, Menorca, Gran Canaria, Tenerife South, Lanzarote, Valencia, and Málaga.

There are also a number of small private airfields.
