= List of municipalities in Valladolid =

Map of Spain with Valladolid highlighted

This is a list of the municipalities in the province of Valladolid in the autonomous community of Castile-Leon, Spain.

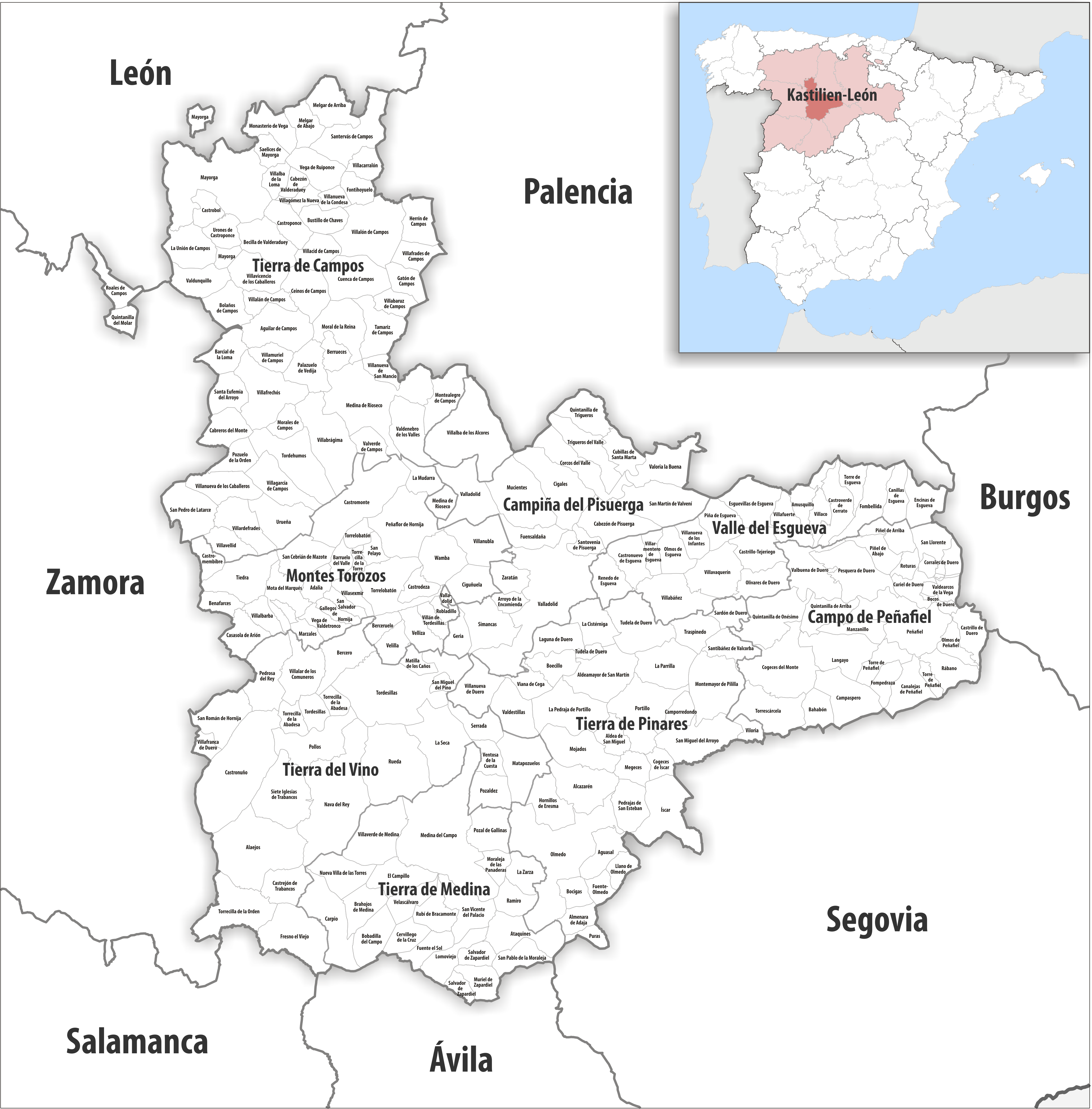
Names of the municipalities and comarcas (shires) that make up the province of Valladolid

Name	Population (2002)
Adalia	82
Aguasal	28
Aguilar de Campos	362
Alaejos	1539
Alcazarén	691
Aldea de San Miguel	219
Aldeamayor de San Martín	1582
Almenara de Adaja	40
Amusquillo	168
Arroyo de la Encomienda	4494
Ataquines	850
Bahabón	195
Barcial de la Loma	154
Barruelo del Valle	75
Becilla de Valderaduey	393
Benafarces	104
Bercero	267
Berceruelo	43
Berrueces	113
Bobadilla del Campo	395
Bocigas	133
Bocos de Duero	80
Boecillo	1884
Bolaños de Campos	380
Brahojos de Medina	169
Bustillo de Chaves	88
Cabezón de Pisuerga	1936
Cabezón de Valderaduey	50
Cabreros del Monte	88
Campaspero	1427
El Campillo	248
Camporredondo	202
Canalejas de Peñafiel	289
Canillas de Esgueva	129
Carpio	1152
Casasola de Arión	339
Castrejón de Trabancos	252
Castrillo de Duero	189
Castrillo-Tejeriego	243
Castrobol	81
Castrodeza	238
Castromembibre	84
Castromonte	420
Castronuevo de Esgueva	332
Castronuño	1056
Castroponce	178
Castroverde de Cerrato	266
Ceinos de Campos	268
Cervillego de la Cruz	146
Cigales	3166
Ciguñuela	368
Cistérniga	4378
Cogeces de Íscar	151
Cogeces del Monte	907
Corcos	248
Corrales de Duero	129
Cubillas de Santa Marta	289
Cuenca de Campos	276
Curiel de Duero	114
Encinas de Esgueva	350
Esguevillas de Esgueva	386
Fombellida	260
Fompedraza	145
Fontihoyuelo	39
Fresno el Viejo	1229
Fuensaldaña	1074
Fuente el Sol	285
Fuente-Olmedo	60
Gallegos de Hornija	149
Gatón de Campos	41
Geria	495
Herrín de Campos	202
Hornillos de Eresma	183
Íscar	6320
Laguna de Duero	21258
Langayo	433
Llano de Olmedo	89
Lomoviejo	252
Manzanillo	54
Marzales	73
Matapozuelos	988
Matilla de los Caños	111
Mayorga	1730
Medina de Rioseco	4864
Medina del Campo	17102
Megeces	473
Melgar de Abajo	175
Melgar de Arriba	306
Mojados	2737
Monasterio de Vega	108
Montealegre de Campos	156
Montemayor de Pililla	1036
Moral de la Reina	223
Moraleja de las Panaderas	33
Morales de Campos	195
Mota del Marqués	455
Mucientes	624
La Mudarra	252
Muriel de Zapardiel	215
Nava del Rey	2198
Nueva Villa de las Torres	418
Olivares de Duero	323
Olmedo	3340
Olmos de Esgueva	202
Olmos de Peñafiel	87
Palazuelo de Vedija	260
La Parrilla	635
La Pedraja de Portillo	1106
Pedrajas de San Esteban	3239
Pedrosa del Rey	237
Peñafiel	5225
Peñaflor de Hornija	440
Pesquera de Duero	562
Piña de Esgueva	387
Piñel de Abajo	212
Piñel de Arriba	145
Pollos	785
Portillo	2536
Pozal de Gallinas	498
Pozaldez	512
Pozuelo de la Orden	73
Puras	64
Quintanilla de Arriba	220
Quintanilla de Onésimo	1123
Quintanilla de Trigueros	117
Quintanilla del Molar	84
Rábano	258
Ramiro	74
Renedo de Esgueva	1201
Roales de Campos	254
Robladillo	104
Roturas	31
Rubí de Bracamonte	314
Rueda	1434
Saelices de Mayorga	196
Salvador de Zapardiel	190
San Cebrián de Mazote	204
San Llorente	197
San Martín de Valvení	104
San Miguel del Arroyo	790
San Miguel del Pino	232
San Pablo de la Moraleja	175
San Pedro de Latarce	638
San Pelayo	43
San Román de Hornija	426
San Salvador	44
San Vicente del Palacio	237
Santa Eufemia del Arroyo	131
Santervás de Campos	159
Santibáñez de Valcorba	205
Santovenia de Pisuerga	2557
Sardón de Duero	661
La Seca	1047
Serrada	1079
Siete Iglesias de Trabancos	591
Simancas	4009
Tamariz de Campos	109
Tiedra	403
Tordehumos	528
Tordesillas	8067
Torre de Esgueva	101
Torre de Peñafiel	48
Torrecilla de la Abadesa	355
Torrecilla de la Orden	352
Torrecilla de la Torre	36
Torrelobatón	572
Torrescárcela	168
Traspinedo	863
Trigueros del Valle	311
Tudela de Duero	6762
La Unión de Campos	326
Urones de Castroponce	151
Urueña	225
Valbuena de Duero	522
Valdearcos de la Vega	128
Valdenebro de los Valles	229
Valdestillas	1584
Valdunquillo	223
Valladolid	318576
Valoria la Buena	643
Valverde de Campos	116
Vega de Ruiponce	124
Vega de Valdetronco	170
Velascálvaro	190
Velilla	150
Velliza	171
Ventosa de la Cuesta	150
Viana de Cega	1628
Villabáñez	478
Villabaruz de Campos	41
Villabrágima	1174
Villacarralón	103
Villacid de Campos	113
Villaco	124
Villafrades de Campos	106
Villafranca de Duero	352
Villafrechós	516
Villafuerte de Esgueva	143
Villagarcía de Campos	426
Villagómez la Nueva	90
Villalán de Campos	55
Villalar de los Comuneros	486
Villalba de la Loma	46
Villalba de los Alcores	566
Villalbarba	162
Villalón de Campos	2008
Villamuriel de Campos	83
Villán de Tordesillas	180
Villanubla	1129
Villanueva de Duero	1027
Villanueva de la Condesa	40
Villanueva de los Caballeros	255
Villanueva de los Infantes	141
Villanueva de San Mancio	102
Villardefrades	240
Villarmentero de Esgueva	123
Villasexmir	120
Villavaquerín	207
Villavellid	68
Villaverde de Medina	576
Villavicencio de los Caballeros	321
Viloria	382
Wamba	375
Zaratán	1727
La Zarza	151

== See also ==
- Geography of Spain
- List of cities in Spain
