= Puras =

Coordinates: 41°11′N 4°39′W

Puras, Spain
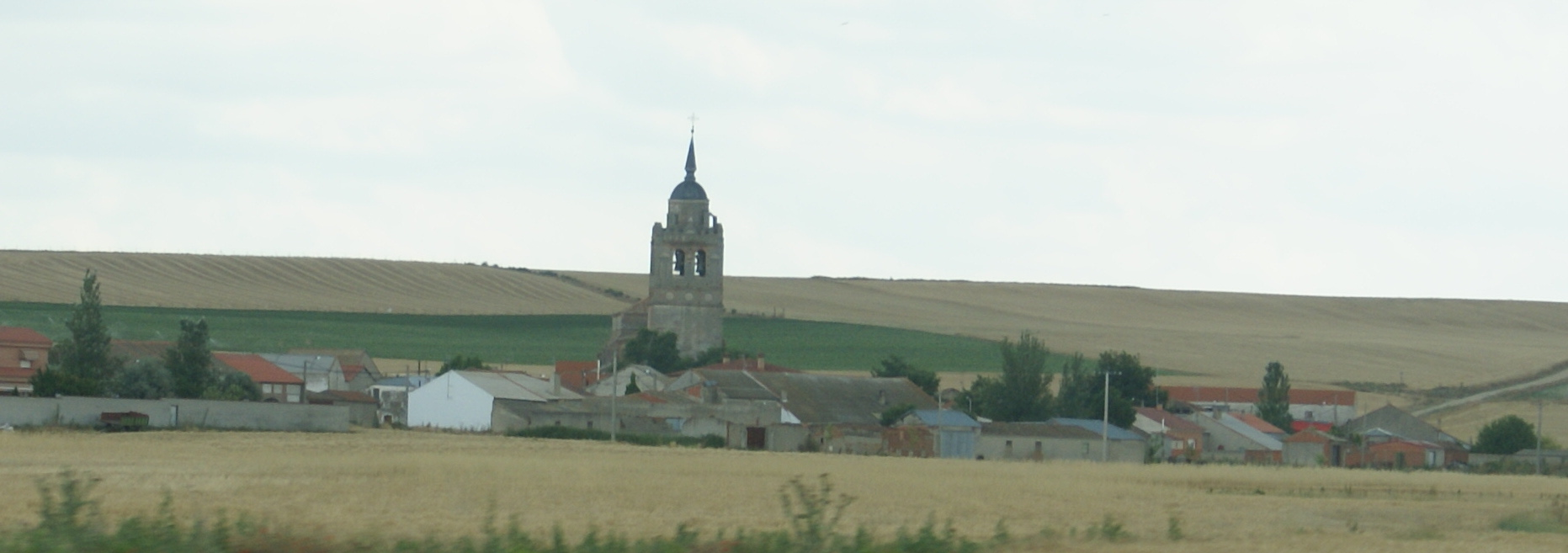
- view
- Country: Spain
- Autonomous community: Castile and León
- Province: Valladolid
- Municipality: Puras

Area
  - Total: 10 km^{2} (3.9 sq mi)

Population (2025-01-01)
  - Total: 44
  - Density: 4.4/km^{2} (11/sq mi)
- Time zone: UTC+1 (CET)
  - Summer (DST): UTC+2 (CEST)

Puras is a municipality located in the province of Valladolid, Castile and León, Spain. According to the 2004 census (INE), the municipality has a population of 63 inhabitants.
