= Velliza =

Coordinates: 41°35′N 4°57′W

Velliza, Spain
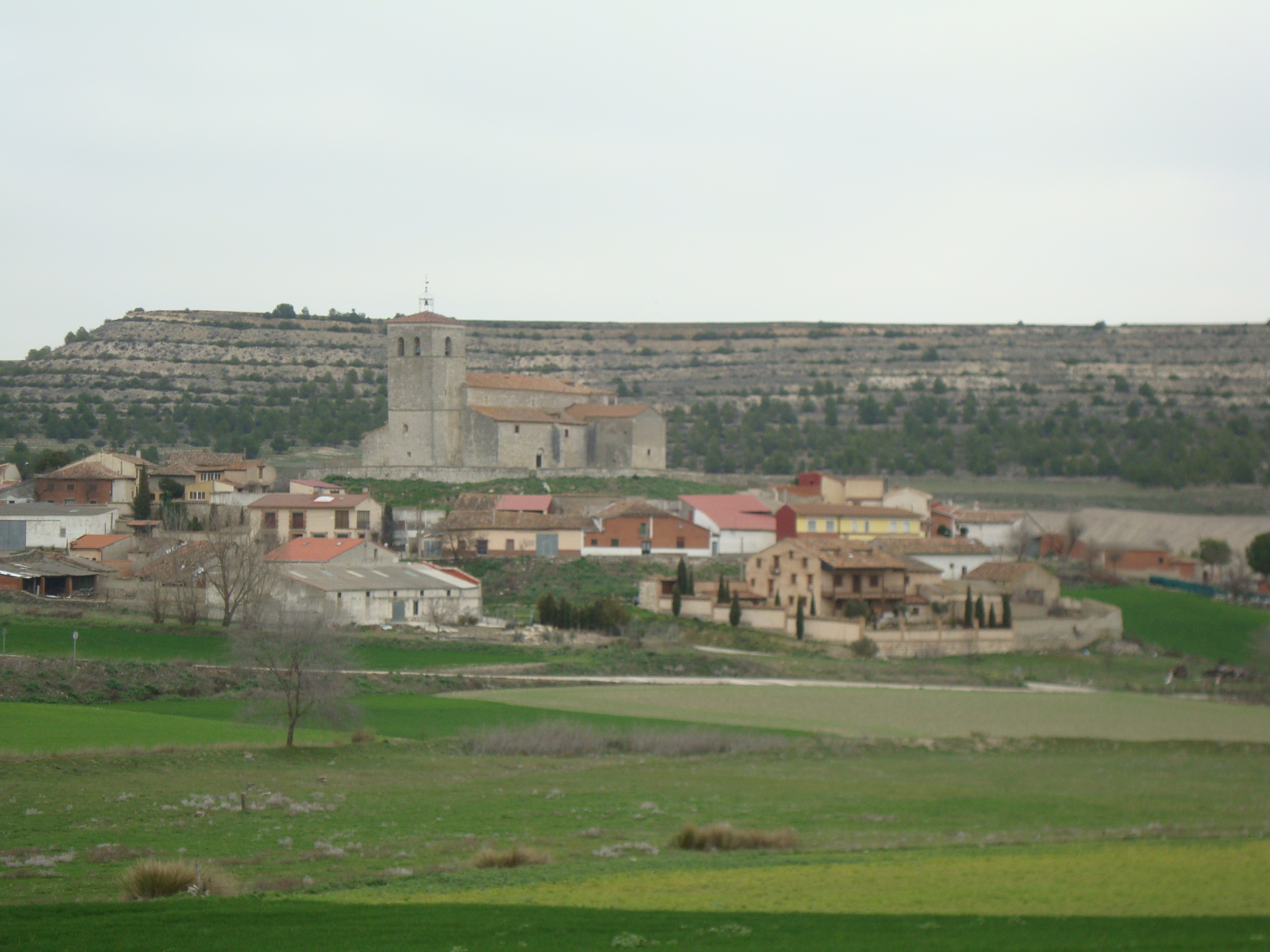

- Coat of arms
- Interactive map of Velliza, Spain
- Country: Spain
- Autonomous community: Castile and León
- Province: Valladolid
- Municipality: Velliza

Area
  - Total: 22 km^{2} (8.5 sq mi)

Population (2025-01-01)
  - Total: 121
  - Density: 5.5/km^{2} (14/sq mi)
- Time zone: UTC+1 (CET)
  - Summer (DST): UTC+2 (CEST)

Velliza is a municipality located in the province of Valladolid, Castile and León, Spain. According to the 2004 census (INE), the municipality has a population of 149 inhabitants.
