= Bercero =

Coordinates: 41°34′N 5°03′W

Bercero, Spain
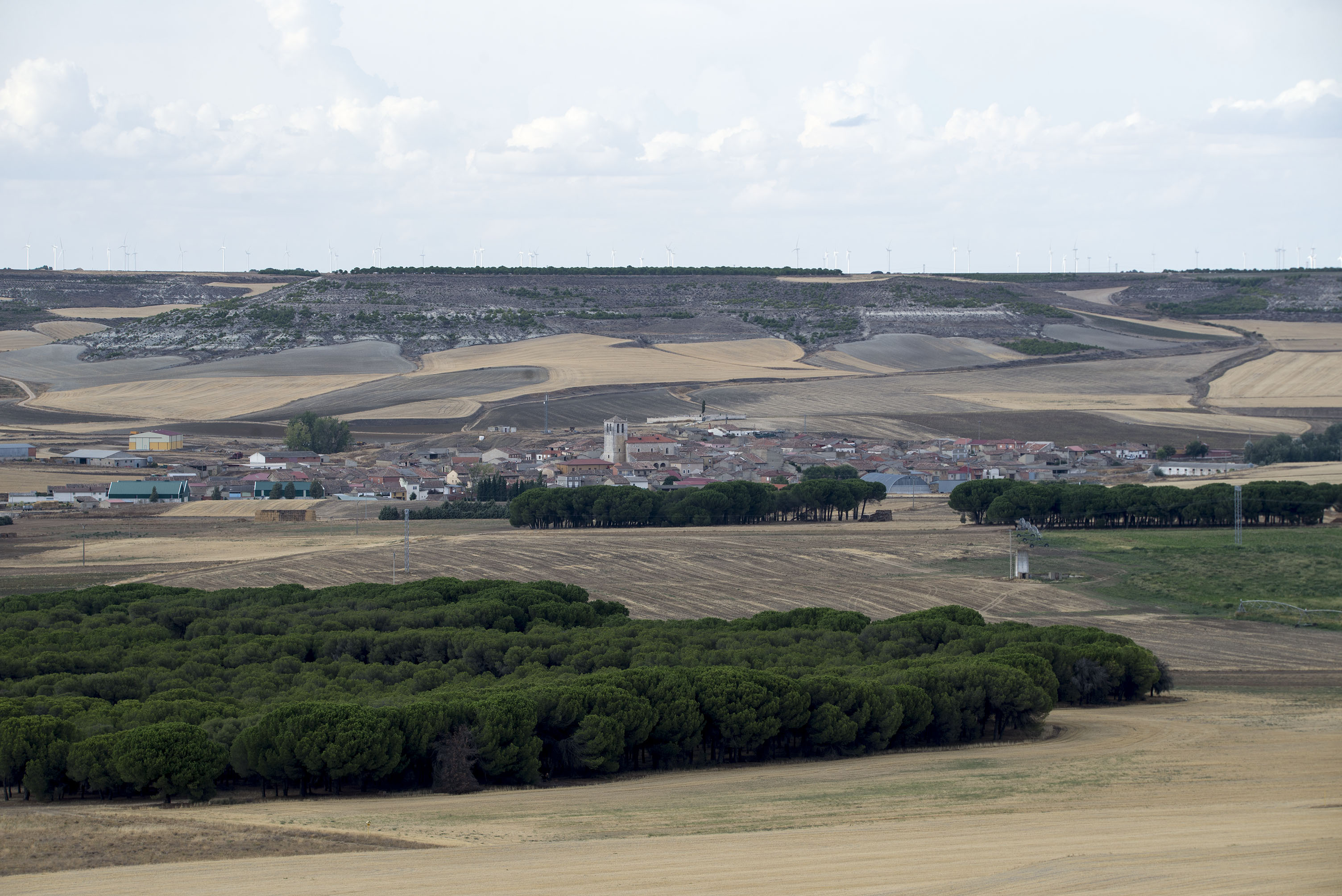
- View of Bercero

- Coat of arms
- Interactive map of Bercero, Spain
- Country: Spain
- Autonomous community: Castile and León
- Province: Valladolid
- Municipality: Bercero

Area
  - Total: 41 km^{2} (16 sq mi)

Population (2025-01-01)
  - Total: 170
  - Density: 4.1/km^{2} (11/sq mi)
- Time zone: UTC+1 (CET)
  - Summer (DST): UTC+2 (CEST)

Bercero is a municipality located in the province of Valladolid, Castile and León, Spain. According to the 2004 census (INE), the municipality has a population of 248 inhabitants.
