= Cogeces de Íscar =

Coordinates: 41°24′00″N 4°32′00″W

Cogeces de Íscar, Spain
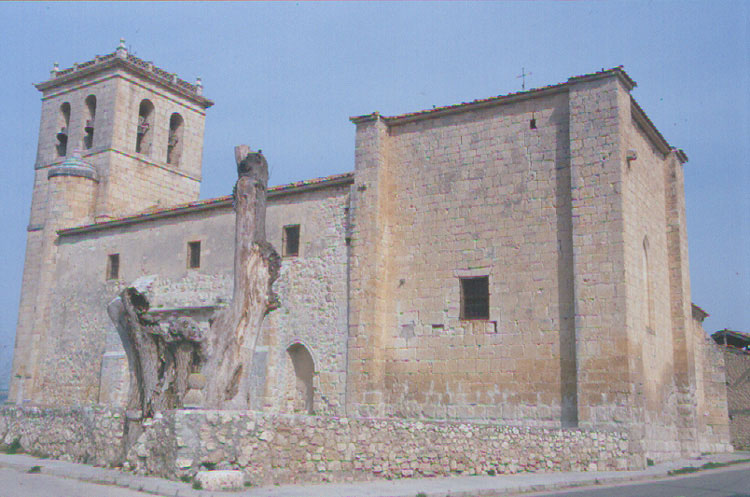
- Church of San Martín
- Country: Spain
- Autonomous community: Castile and León
- Province: Valladolid
- Municipality: Cogeces de Íscar

Area
  - Total: 13.41 km^{2} (5.18 sq mi)

Population (2025-01-01)
  - Total: 143
  - Density: 10.7/km^{2} (27.6/sq mi)
- Time zone: UTC+1 (CET)
  - Summer (DST): UTC+2 (CEST)

Cogeces de Íscar is a municipality located in the province of Valladolid, Castile and León, Spain. According to the 2025 census (INE), the municipality had a population of 143 inhabitants.
