= Rábano =

Coordinates: 41°32′N 4°04′W

Rábano, Spain
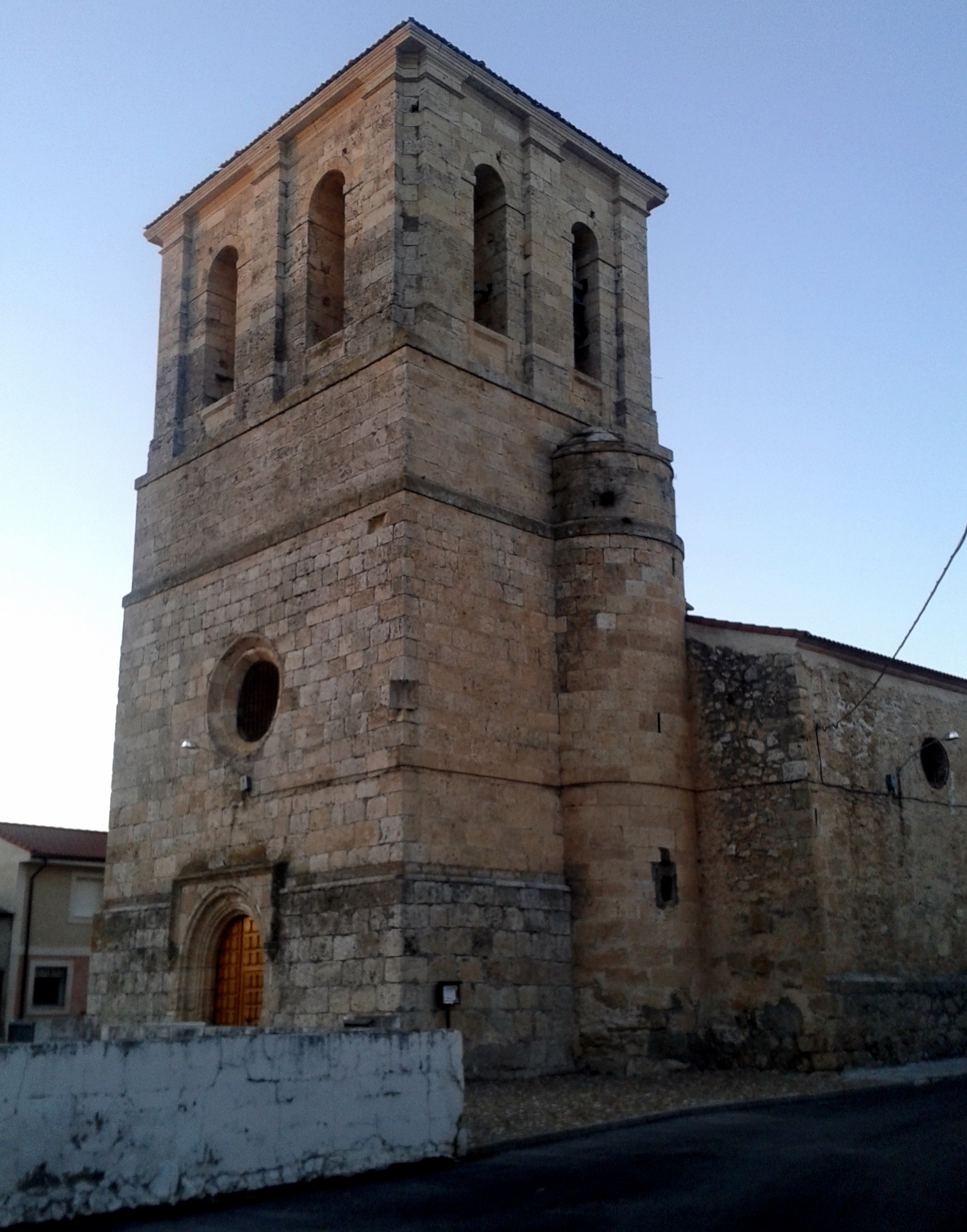
- Church of St. Thomas in Rábano

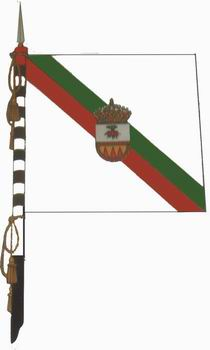
- Flag Coat of arms
- Interactive map of Rábano, Spain
- Country: Spain
- Autonomous community: Castile and León
- Province: Valladolid
- Municipality: Rábano

Area
  - Total: 27 km^{2} (10 sq mi)

Population (2025-01-01)
  - Total: 169
  - Density: 6.3/km^{2} (16/sq mi)
- Time zone: UTC+1 (CET)
  - Summer (DST): UTC+2 (CEST)

Rábano is a municipality located in the province of Valladolid, Castile and León, Spain. According to the 2004 census (INE), the municipality has a population of 249 inhabitants.
