= Marzales =

Coordinates: 41°35′N 5°08′W

Marzales, Spain
- Coat of arms
- Interactive map of Marzales, Spain
- Country: Spain
- Autonomous community: Castile and León
- Province: Valladolid
- Municipality: Marzales

Area
  - Total: 12 km^{2} (4.6 sq mi)

Population (2025-01-01)
  - Total: 45
  - Density: 3.8/km^{2} (9.7/sq mi)
- Time zone: UTC+1 (CET)
  - Summer (DST): UTC+2 (CEST)

Marzales is a municipality located in the province of Valladolid, Castile and León, Spain. According to the 2004 census (INE), the municipality has a population of 64 inhabitants.

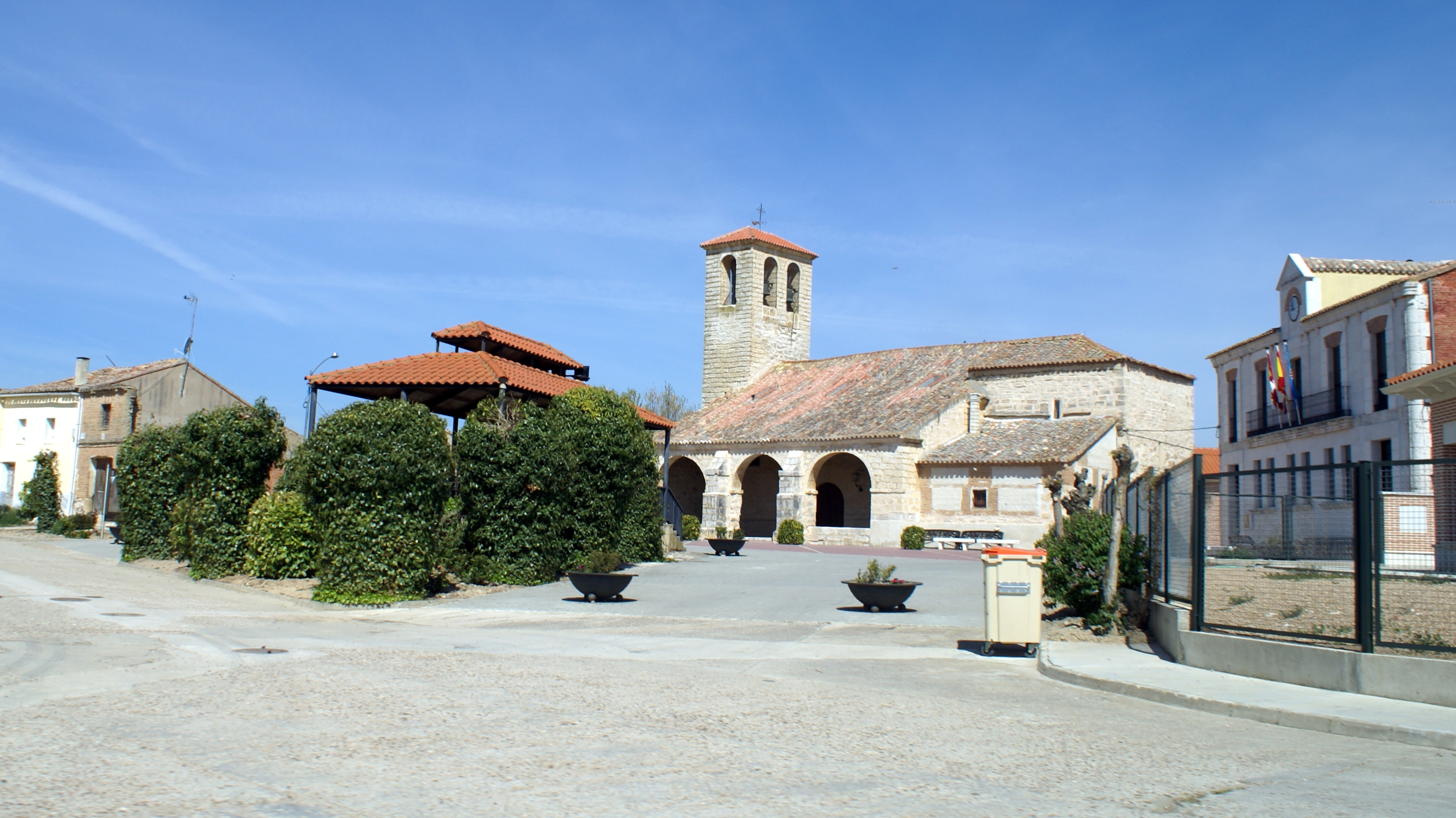
San Cristóbal Church and Ayuntamiento of Marzales.
