= Langayo =

Coordinates: 41°34′N 4°12′W

Langayo, Spain
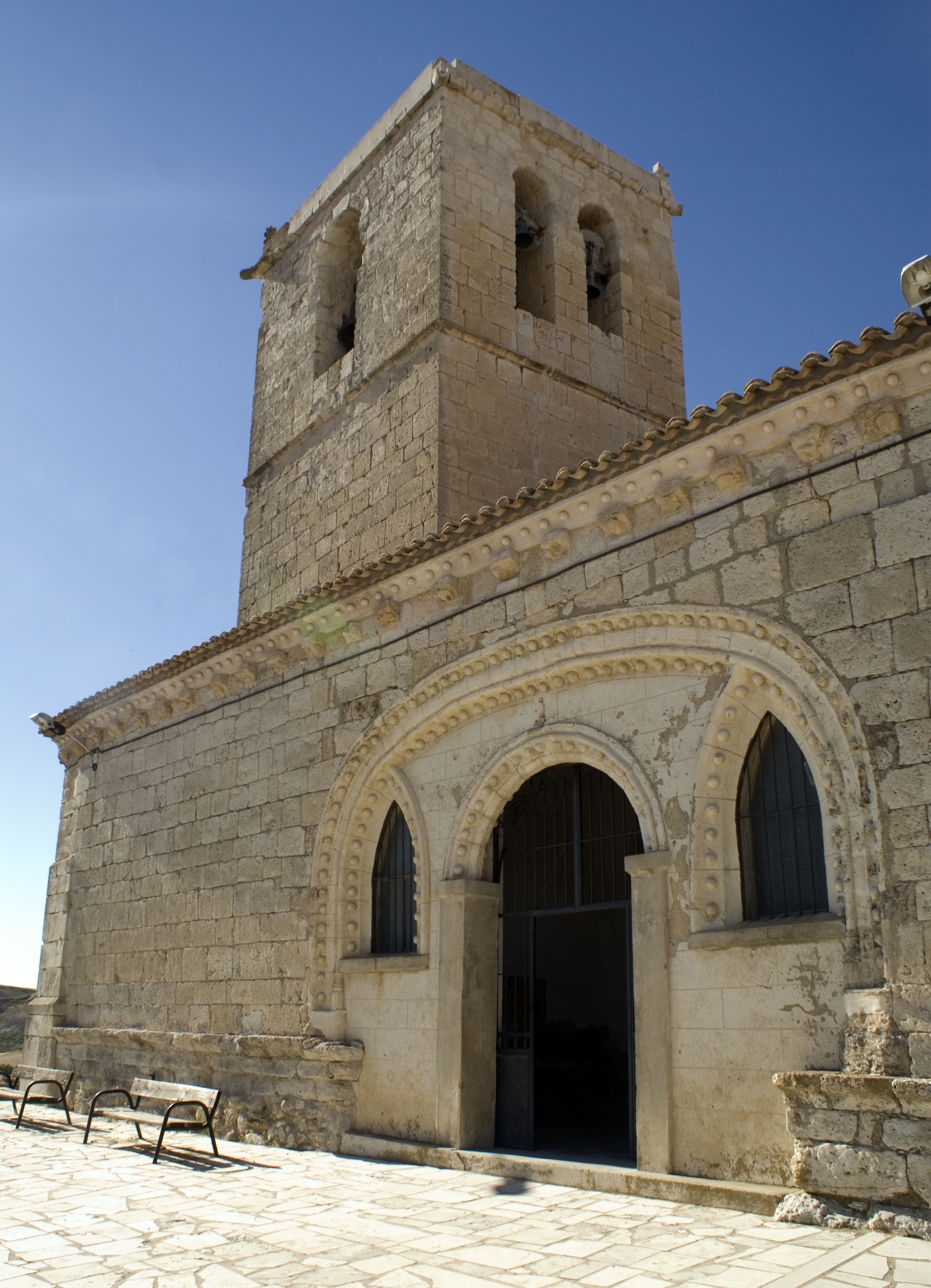
- Church of Langayo
- Country: Spain
- Autonomous community: Castile and León
- Province: Valladolid
- Municipality: Langayo

Area
  - Total: 48 km^{2} (19 sq mi)

Population (2025-01-01)
  - Total: 246
  - Density: 5.1/km^{2} (13/sq mi)
- Time zone: UTC+1 (CET)
  - Summer (DST): UTC+2 (CEST)

Langayo is a municipality located in the province of Valladolid, Castile and León, Spain. According to the 2004 census (INE), the municipality has a population of 398 inhabitants.
