= Castronuevo de Esgueva =

Coordinates: 41°41′N 4°35′W

Castronuevo de Esgueva, Spain
- Flag Coat of arms

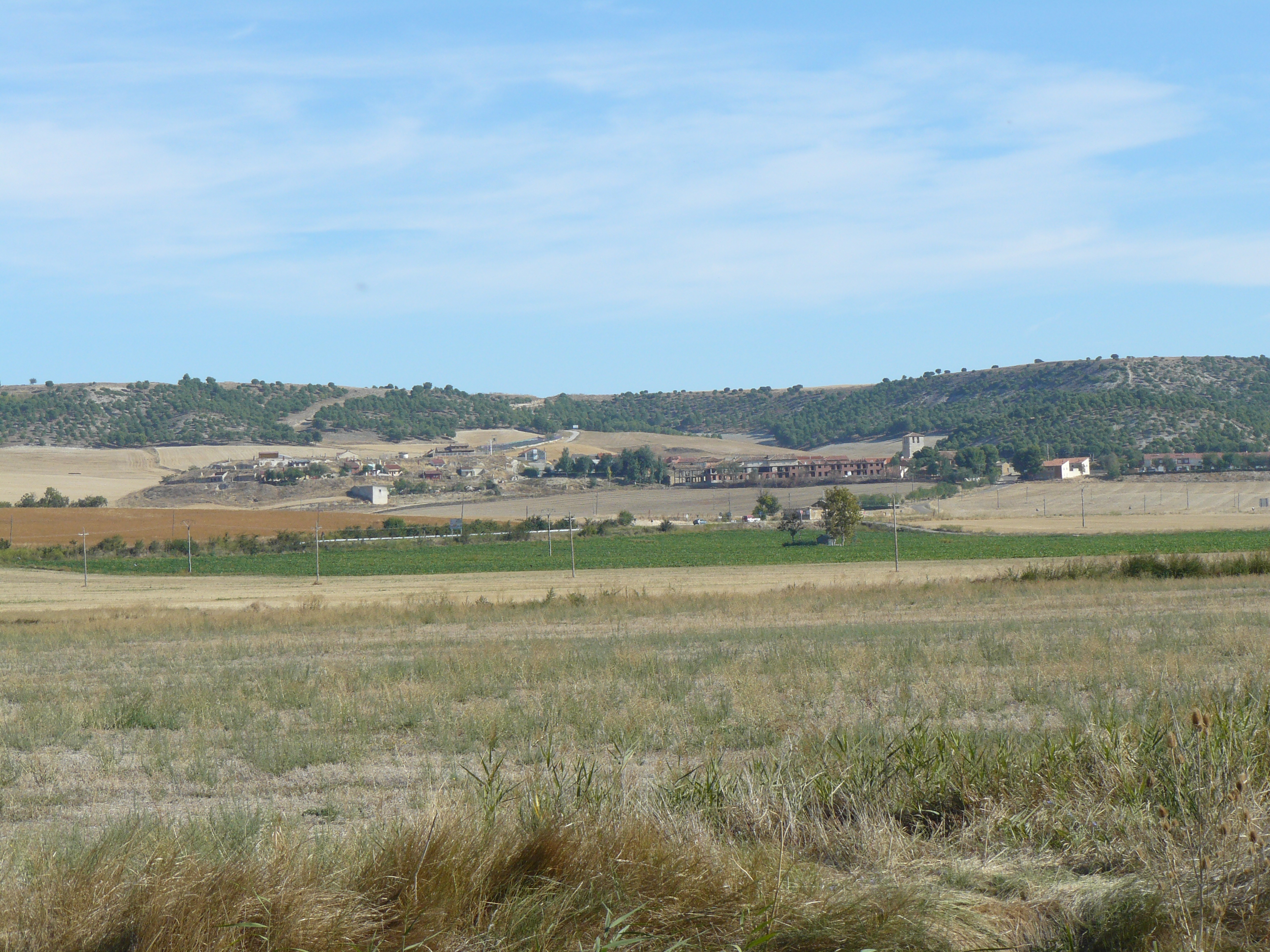
- Panoramic view
- Country: Spain
- Autonomous community: Castile and León
- Province: Valladolid
- Municipality: Castronuevo de Esgueva

Area
  - Total: 29 km^{2} (11 sq mi)

Population (2025-01-01)
  - Total: 412
  - Density: 14/km^{2} (37/sq mi)
- Time zone: UTC+1 (CET)
  - Summer (DST): UTC+2 (CEST)

Castronuevo de Esgueva is a municipality located in the province of Valladolid, Castile and León, Spain. According to the 2004 census (INE), the municipality has a population of 337 inhabitants.

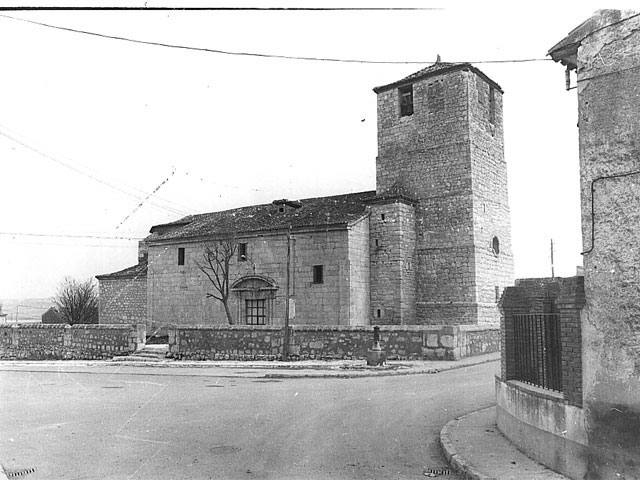
Church of Santa María de la Concepción, half 20th century.

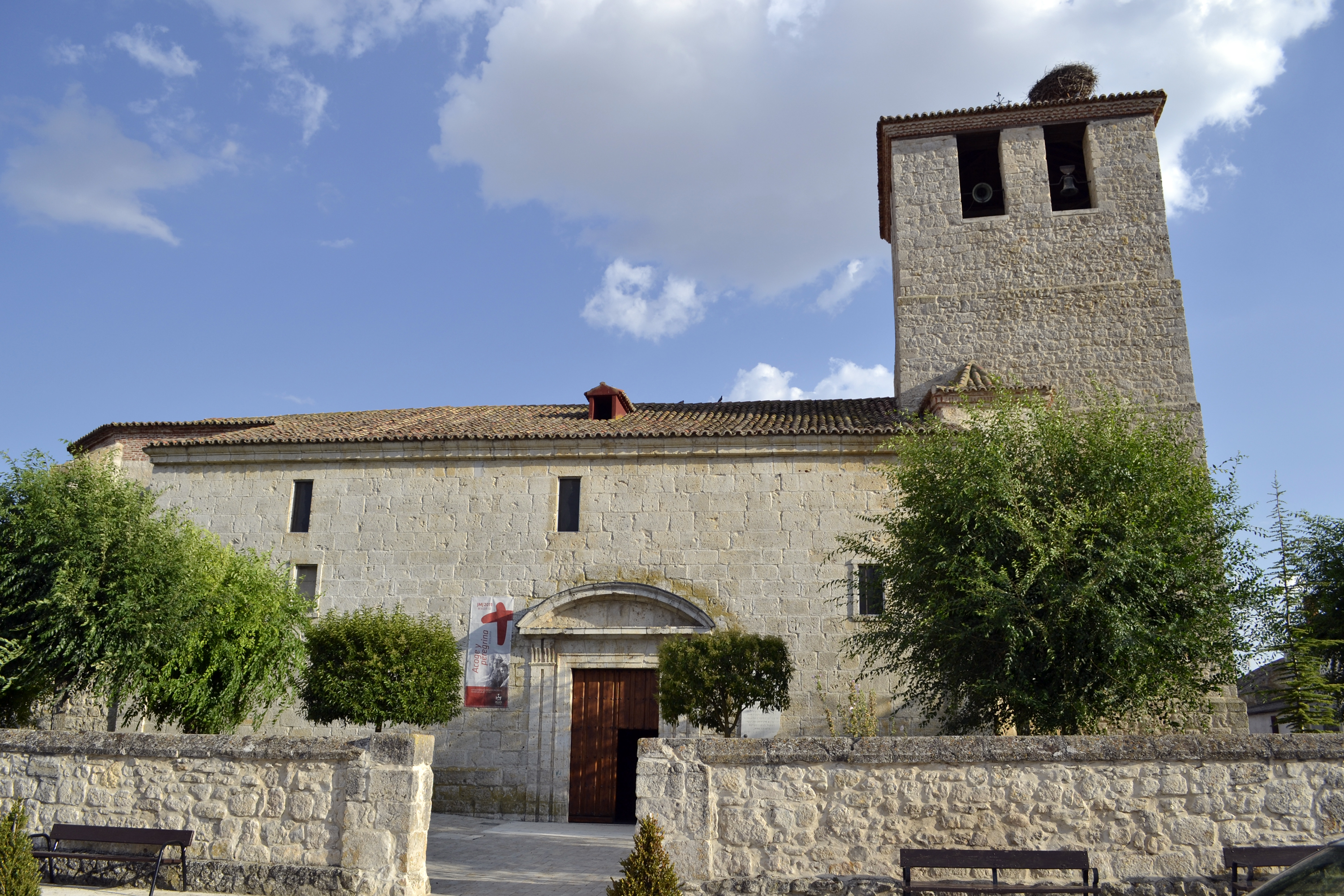
Church of Santa María de la Concepción, nowadays.
