= Villarmentero de Esgueva =

Coordinates: 41°41′N 4°32′W

Villarmentero de Esgueva, Spain
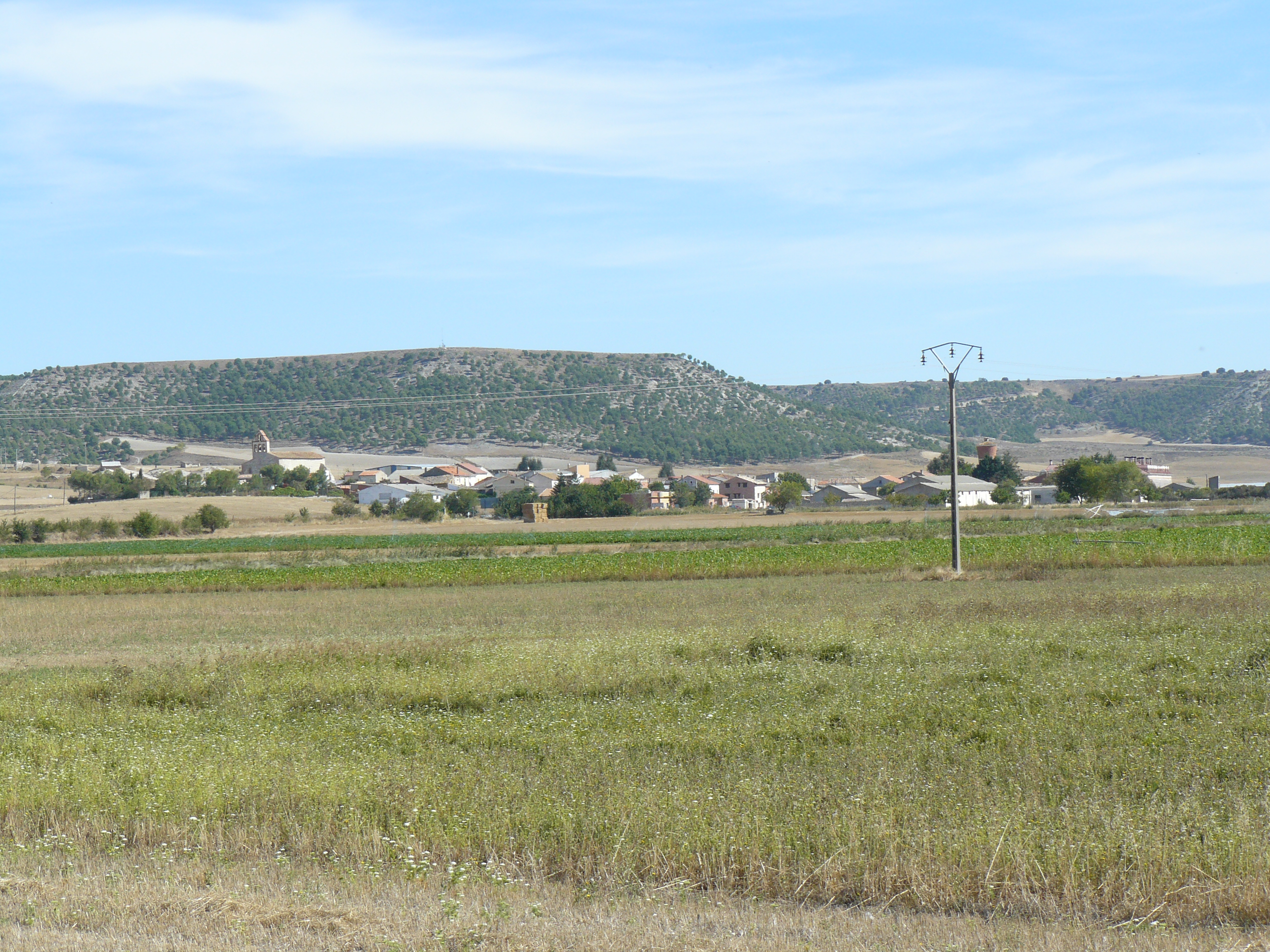
- Panoramic view.
- Country: Spain
- Autonomous community: Castile and León
- Province: Valladolid
- Municipality: Villarmentero de Esgueva

Area
  - Total: 13.47 km^{2} (5.20 sq mi)
- Elevation: 725 m (2,379 ft)

Population (2025-01-01)
  - Total: 99
  - Density: 7.3/km^{2} (19/sq mi)
- Time zone: UTC+1 (CET)
  - Summer (DST): UTC+2 (CEST)

Villarmentero de Esgueva is a municipality located in the province of Valladolid, Castile and León, Spain. According to the 2004 census (INE), the municipality had a population of 123 inhabitants.
