= Villabáñez =

Villabáñez, Spain
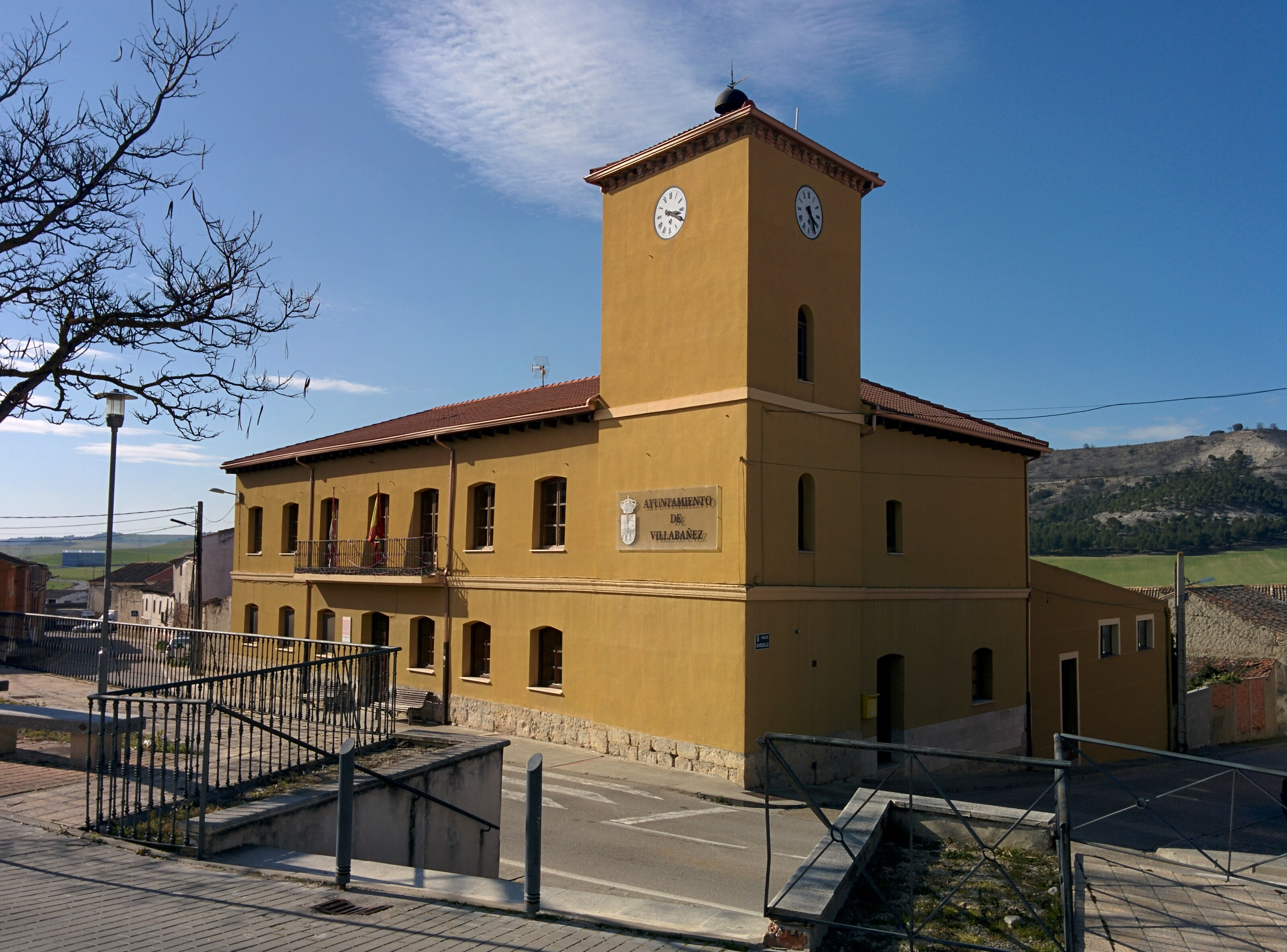
- Town hall

- Coat of arms

- Location in Spain
- Coordinates: 41.6297°N 4.5236°W
- Country: Spain
- Autonomous community: Castile and León
- Province: Valladolid
- Municipality: Villabáñez

Area
  - Total: 51 km^{2} (20 sq mi)

Population (2025-01-01)
  - Total: 516
  - Density: 10/km^{2} (26/sq mi)
- Time zone: UTC+1 (CET)
  - Summer (DST): UTC+2 (CEST)

Villabáñez is a municipality located in the province of Valladolid, Castile and León, Spain. According to the 2004 census (INE), the municipality has a population of 480 inhabitants.
