= Aguasal =

Coordinates: 41°16′N 4°39′W

Aguasal, Spain
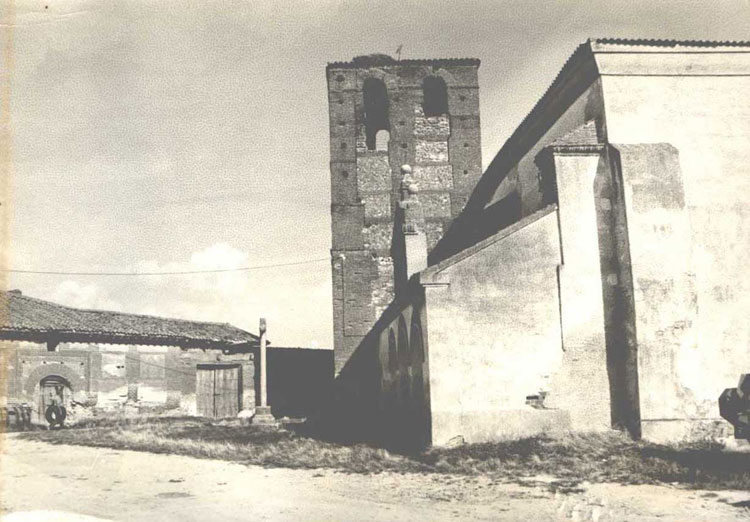
- Church of San Pedro
- Country: Spain
- Autonomous community: Castile and León
- Province: Valladolid
- Municipality: Aguasal

Area
  - Total: 26 km^{2} (10 sq mi)

Population (2025-01-01)
  - Total: 18
  - Density: 0.69/km^{2} (1.8/sq mi)
- Time zone: UTC+1 (CET)
  - Summer (DST): UTC+2 (CEST)

Aguasal is a municipality located in the province of Valladolid, Castile and León, Spain. According to the 2025 census (INE), the municipality had a population of 18 inhabitants.

== Demography ==
According to the 2004 census (INE), the municipality had a population of 25 inhabitants.

According to the 2025 census (INE), the municipality had a population of 18 inhabitants.

== Gallery ==
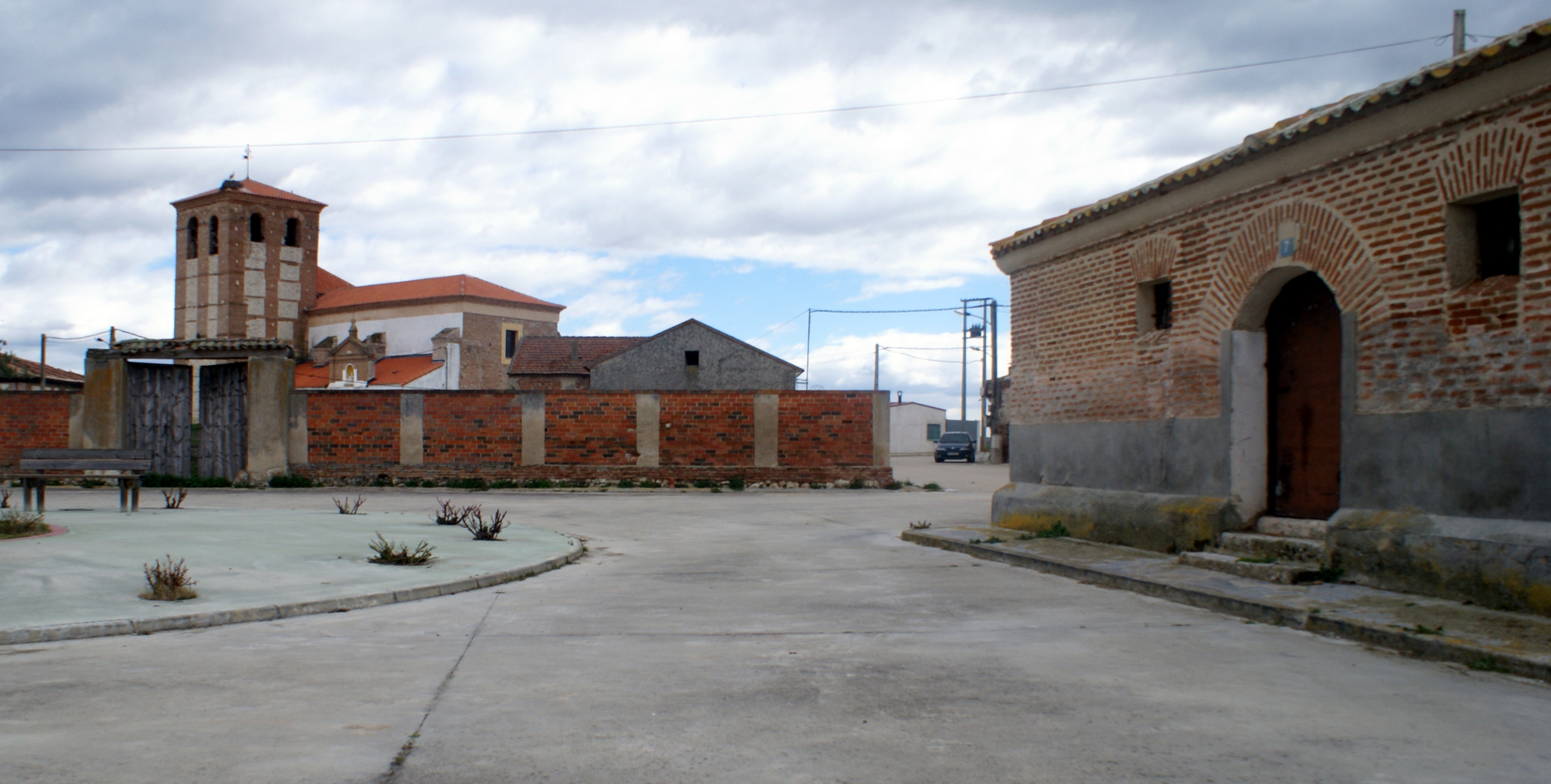
View of Aguasal

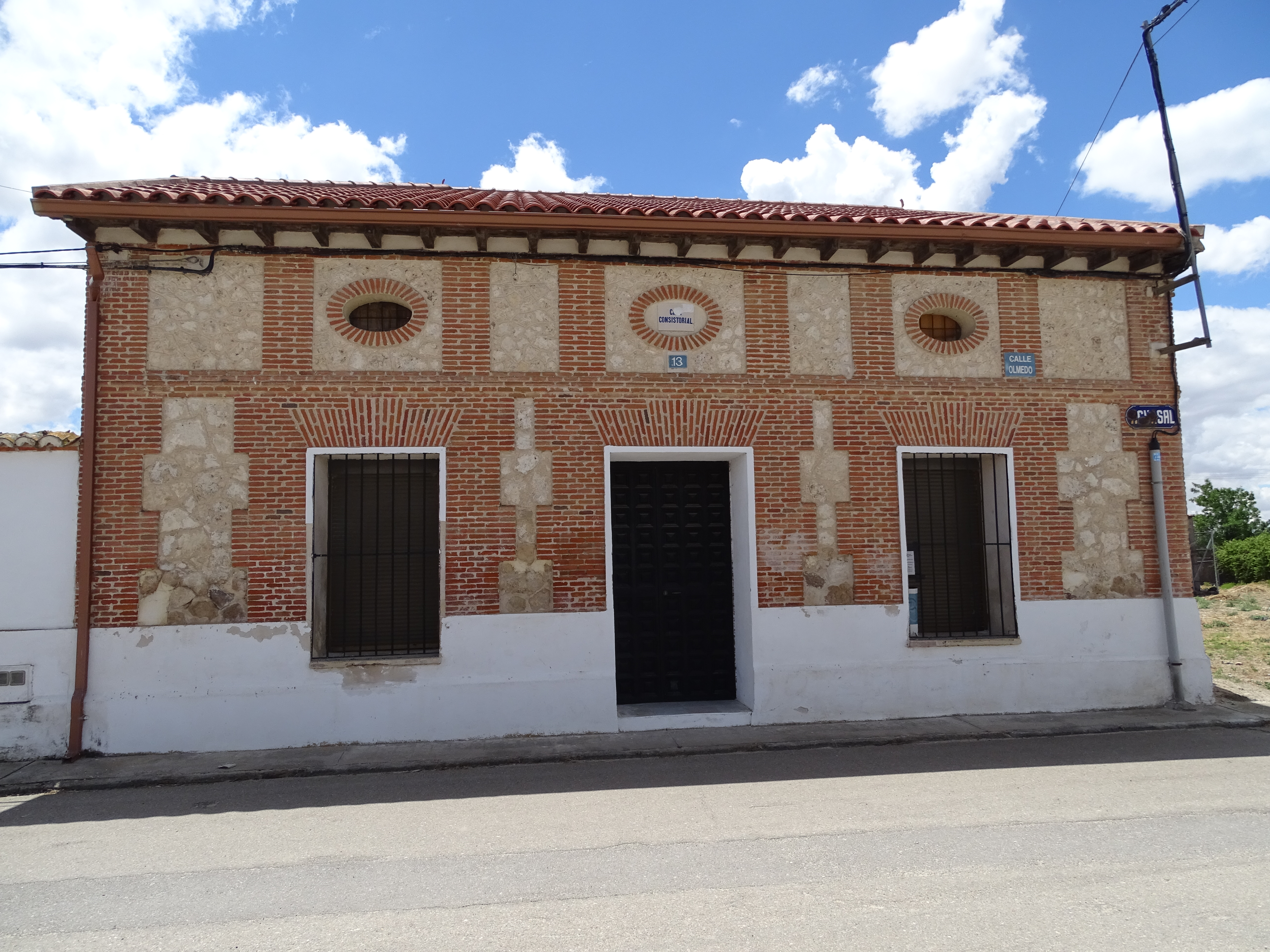
The town hall, headquarters of the Aguasal City Council
