= Cervillego de la Cruz =

Coordinates: 41°11′N 4°57′W

Cervillego de la Cruz, Spain
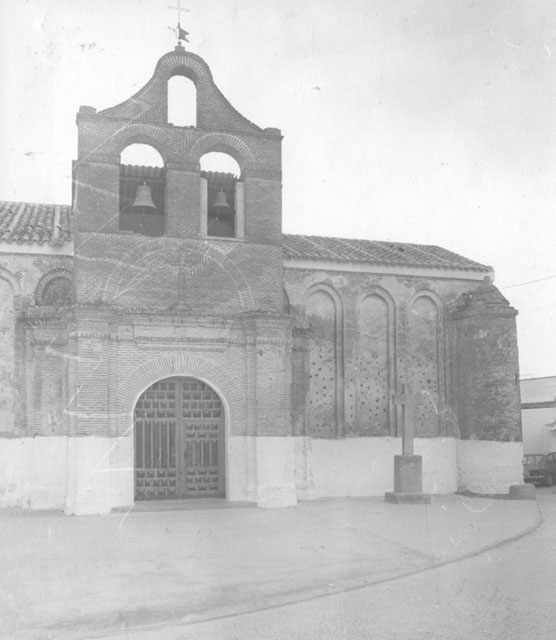
- Church of San Juan
- Country: Spain
- Autonomous community: Castile and León
- Province: Valladolid
- Municipality: Cervillego de la Cruz

Area
  - Total: 21 km^{2} (8.1 sq mi)
- Elevation: 754 m (2,474 ft)

Population (2025-01-01)
  - Total: 87
  - Density: 4.1/km^{2} (11/sq mi)
- Time zone: UTC+1 (CET)
  - Summer (DST): UTC+2 (CEST)

Cervillego de la Cruz is a municipality located in the province of Valladolid, Castile and León, Spain. According to the 2004 census (INE), the municipality has a population of 139 inhabitants.
