= Villamuriel de Campos =

Coordinates: 41°57′N 5°12′W

Villamuriel de Campos, Spain
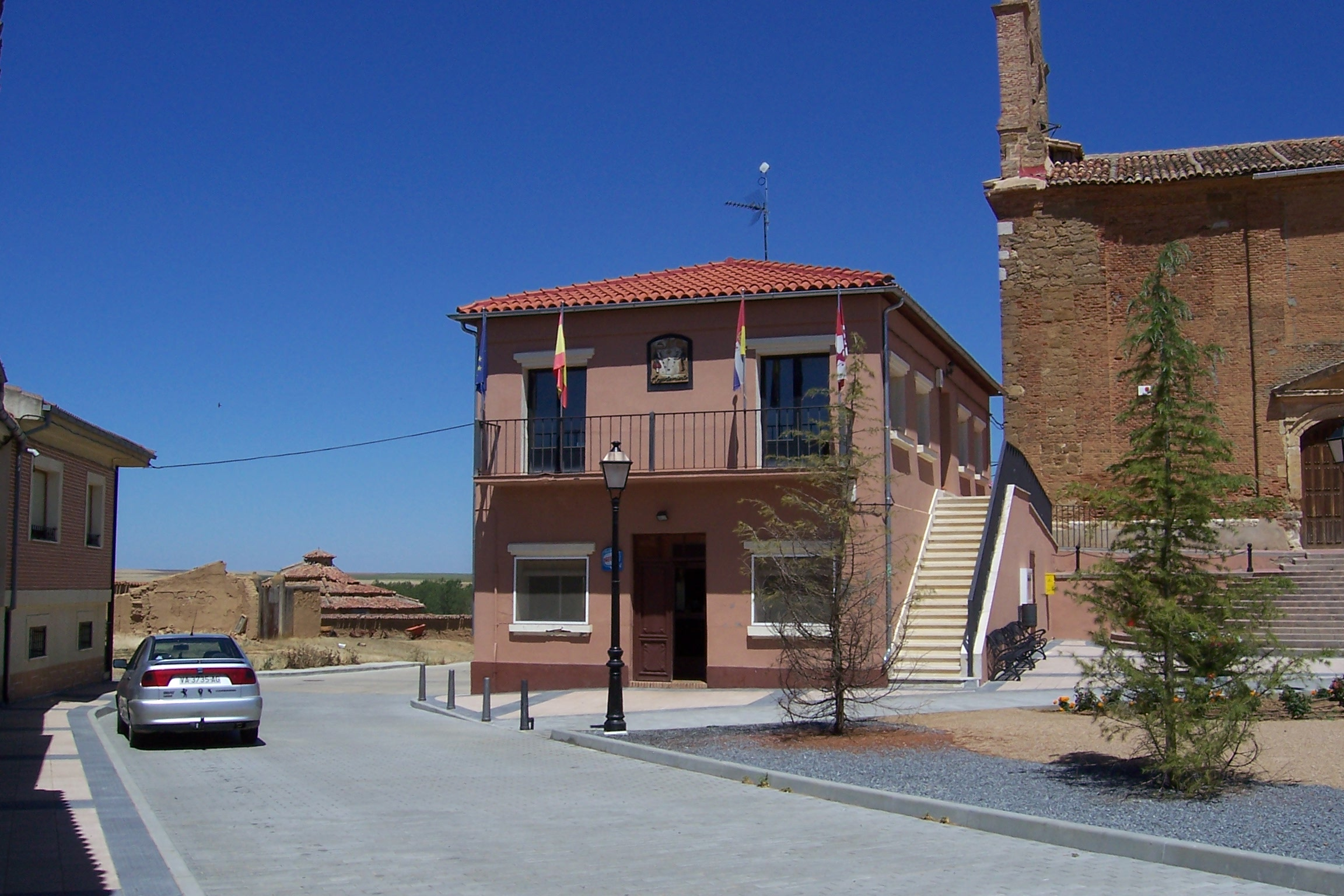
- Town hall of Villamuriel de Campos

- Coat of arms

- Map of Villamuriel de Campos
- Country: Spain
- Autonomous community: Castile and León
- Province: Valladolid
- Municipality: Villamuriel de Campos

Area
  - Total: 18.28 km^{2} (7.06 sq mi)
- Elevation: 717 m (2,352 ft)

Population (2025-01-01)
  - Total: 55
  - Density: 3.0/km^{2} (7.8/sq mi)
- Time zone: UTC+1 (CET)
  - Summer (DST): UTC+2 (CEST)

Villamuriel de Campos is a municipality located in the province of Valladolid, Castile and León, Spain. According to the 2004 census (INE), the municipality had a population of 81 inhabitants.
