= Nueva Villa de las Torres =

Coordinates: 41°16′N 5°03′W

Nueva Villa de las Torres, Spain
- Flag Coat of arms
- Interactive map of Nueva Villa de las Torres, Spain
- Country: Spain
- Autonomous community: Castile and León
- Province: Valladolid
- Municipality: Nueva Villa de las Torres

Area
  - Total: 35 km^{2} (14 sq mi)
- Elevation: 743 m (2,438 ft)

Population (2025-01-01)
  - Total: 265
  - Density: 7.6/km^{2} (20/sq mi)
- Time zone: UTC+1 (CET)
  - Summer (DST): UTC+2 (CEST)

Nueva Villa de las Torres is a municipality located in the province of Valladolid, Castile and León, Spain. According to the 2004 census (INE), the municipality has a population of 393 inhabitants.

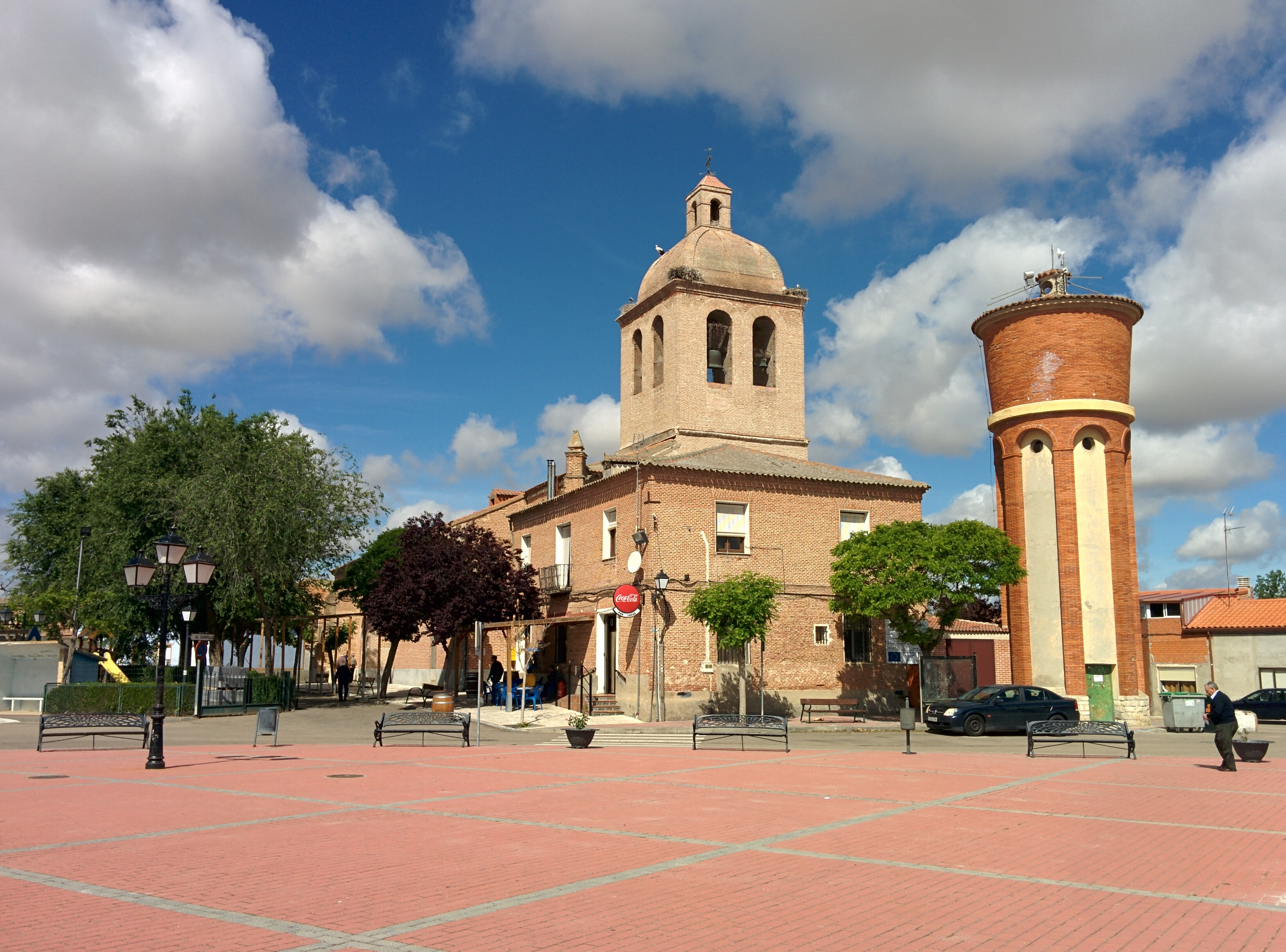
Church of Santa María del Castillo and town hall in Nueva Villa de las Torres, Valladolid, Spain
