= Castromembibre =

Coordinates: 41°40′N 5°18′W

Castromembibre, Spain
- Coat of arms

- Castromembibre in Valladolid Province
- Country: Spain
- Autonomous community: Castile and León
- Province: Valladolid
- Municipality: Castromembibre

Government
  - Mayor: Inmaculada Alonso Cortés

Area
  - Total: 16.6 km^{2} (6.4 sq mi)
- Elevation: 786 m (2,579 ft)

Population (2025-01-01)
  - Total: 49
  - Density: 3.0/km^{2} (7.6/sq mi)
- Time zone: UTC+1 (CET)
  - Summer (DST): UTC+2 (CEST)

Castromembibre is a municipality located in the province of Valladolid, Castile and León, Spain. According to the 2004 census (INE), the municipality has a population of 80 inhabitants.
