= Piñel de Arriba =

Coordinates: 41°42′N 4°07′W

Piñel de Arriba, Spain
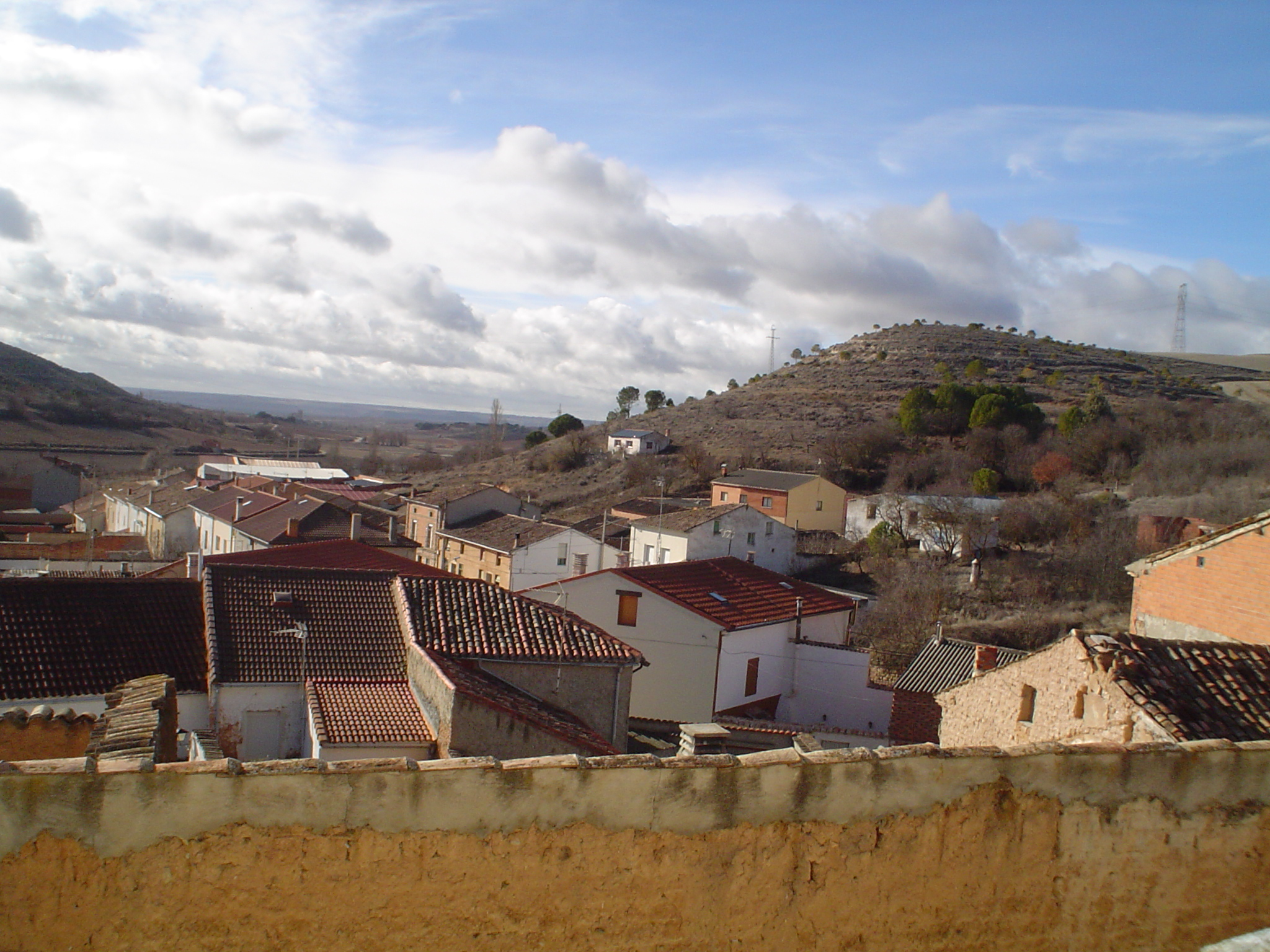
- View of the town of Piñel de Arriba (Valladolid) from the atrium of its church.
- Interactive map of Piñel de Arriba, Spain
- Country: Spain
- Autonomous community: Castile and León
- Province: Valladolid
- Municipality: Piñel de Arriba

Area
  - Total: 23 km^{2} (8.9 sq mi)

Population (2025-01-01)
  - Total: 81
  - Density: 3.5/km^{2} (9.1/sq mi)
- Time zone: UTC+1 (CET)
  - Summer (DST): UTC+2 (CEST)

Piñel de Arriba is a municipality located in the province of Valladolid, Castile and León, Spain. According to the 2004 census (INE), the municipality has a population of 137 inhabitants.
