= Torre de Esgueva =

Coordinates: 41°46′N 4°12′W

Torre de Esgueva, Spain
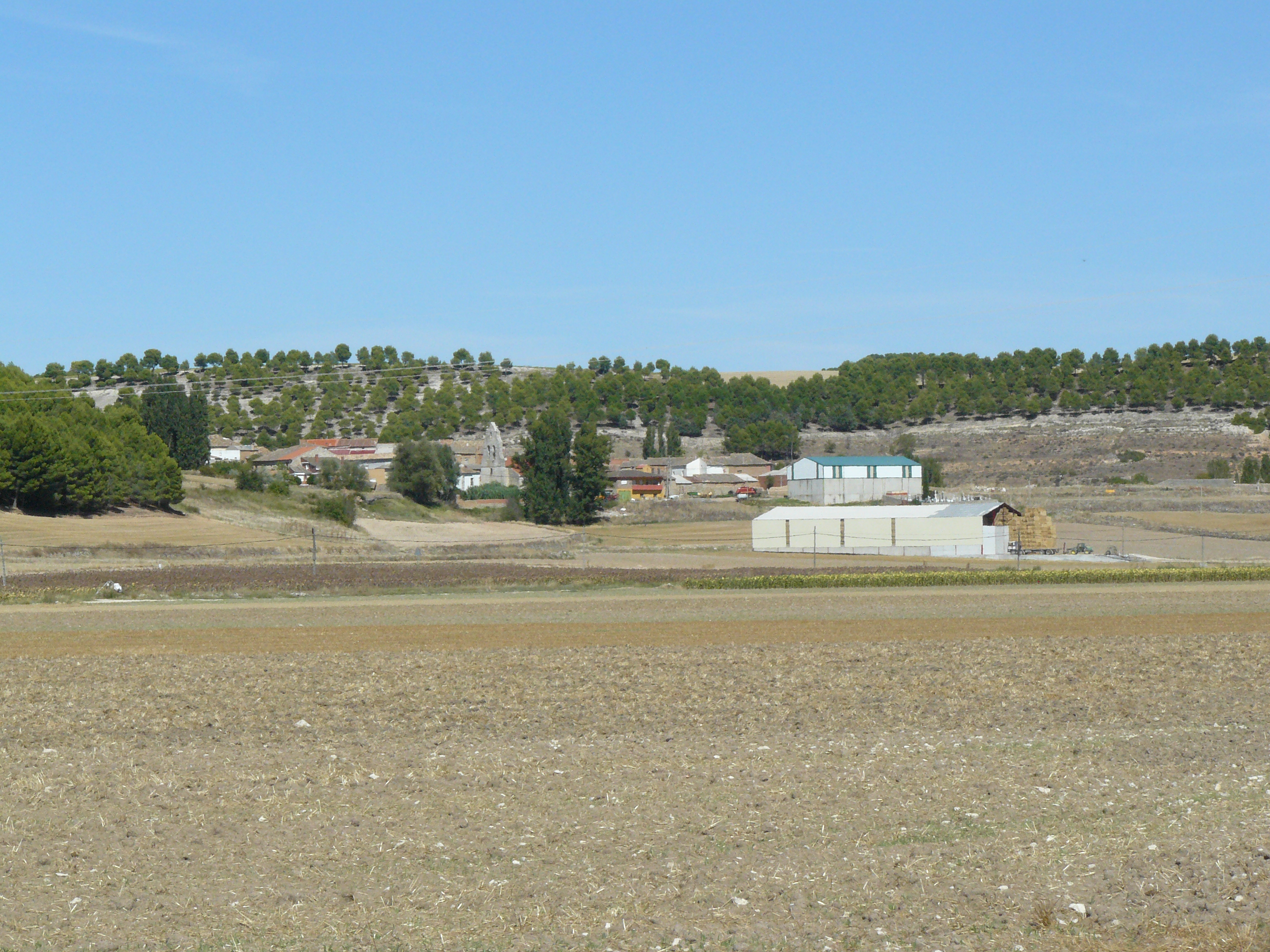
- panoramic view
- Country: Spain
- Autonomous community: Castile and León
- Province: Valladolid
- Municipality: Torre de Esgueva

Area
  - Total: 23 km^{2} (8.9 sq mi)

Population (2025-01-01)
  - Total: 60
  - Density: 2.6/km^{2} (6.8/sq mi)
- Time zone: UTC+1 (CET)
  - Summer (DST): UTC+2 (CEST)

Torre de Esgueva is a municipality located in the province of Valladolid, Castile and León, Spain. According to the 2004 census (INE), the municipality has a population of 98 inhabitants.
