= Fombellida =

Fombellida, Spain
- panoramic view
- Coordinates: 41°46′N 4°11′W
- Country: Spain
- Autonomous community: Castile and León
- Province: Valladolid
- Municipality: Fombellida

Area
  - Total: 35 km^{2} (14 sq mi)

Population (2025-01-01)
  - Total: 169
  - Density: 4.8/km^{2} (13/sq mi)
- Time zone: UTC+1 (CET)
  - Summer (DST): UTC+2 (CEST)

Fombellida is a municipality located in the province of Valladolid, Castile and León, Spain. According to the 2004 census (INE), the municipality has a population of 244 inhabitants.
