= Esguevillas de Esgueva =

Coordinates: 41°45′N 4°22′W

Esguevillas de Esgueva, Spain
- Coat of arms

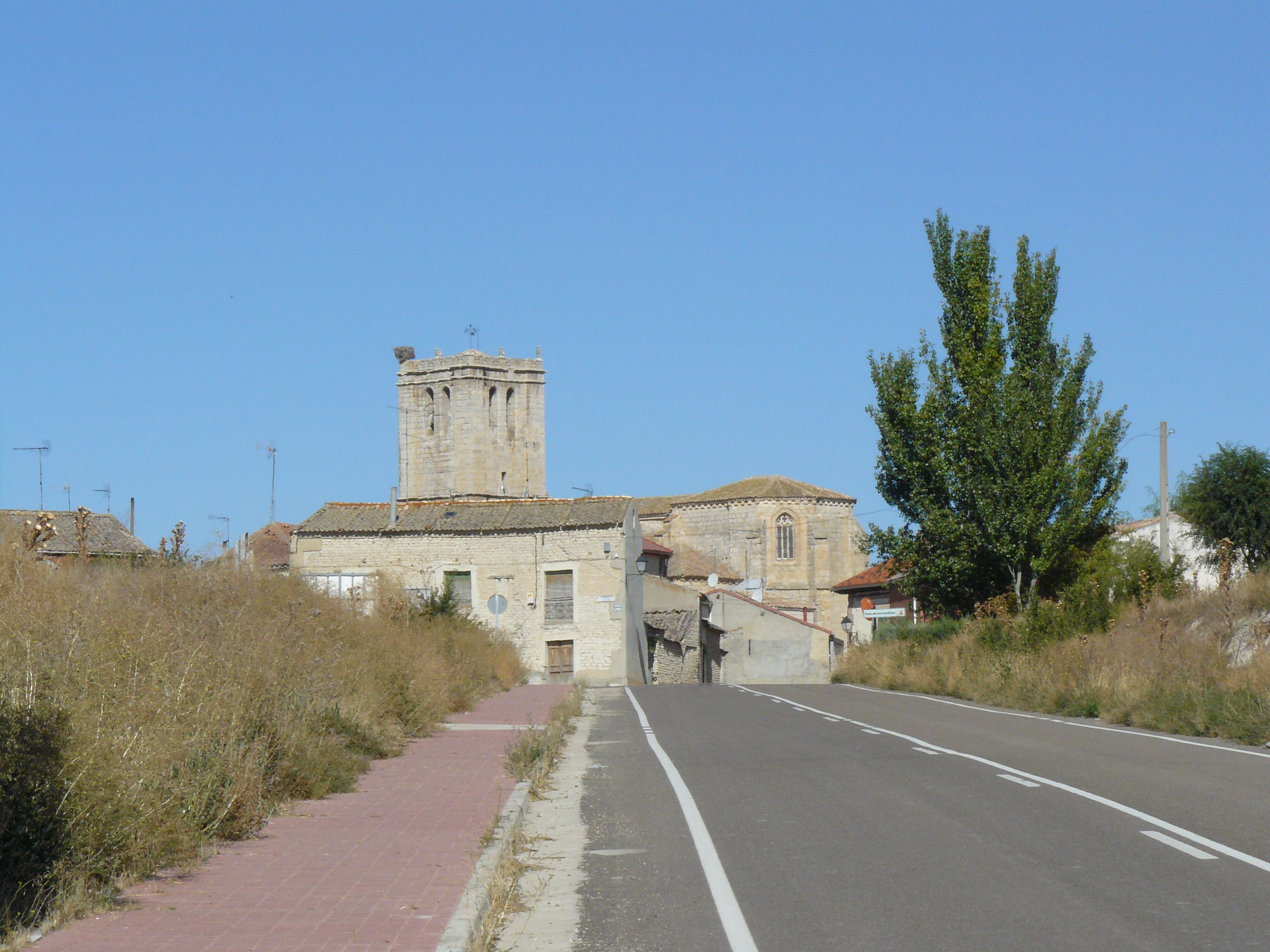
- Country: Spain
- Autonomous community: Castile and León
- Province: Valladolid
- Municipality: Esguevillas de Esgueva

Area
  - Total: 41.53 km^{2} (16.03 sq mi)
- Elevation: 780 m (2,560 ft)

Population (2025-01-01)
  - Total: 257
  - Density: 6.19/km^{2} (16.0/sq mi)
- Time zone: UTC+1 (CET)
  - Summer (DST): UTC+2 (CEST)

Esguevillas de Esgueva is a municipality located in the province of Valladolid, Castile and León, Spain. According to the 2004 census (INE), the municipality had a population of 350 inhabitants.

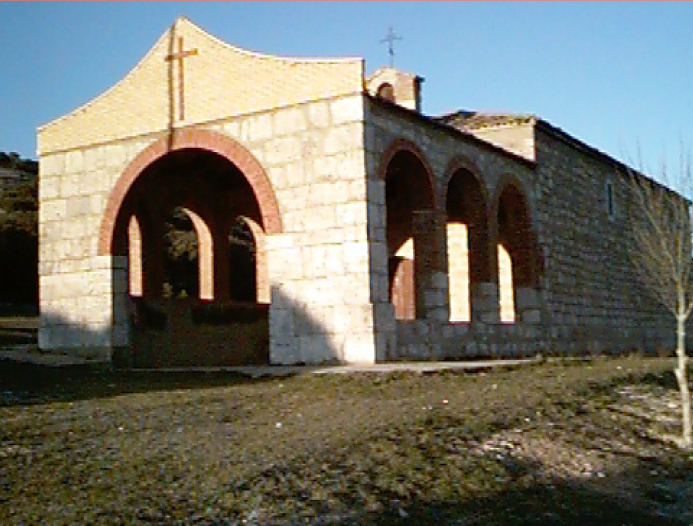
Hermitage of San Vicente Ferrer.
