= Bocigas =

Coordinates: 41°14′N 4°41′W

Bocigas, Spain
- Flag Coat of arms

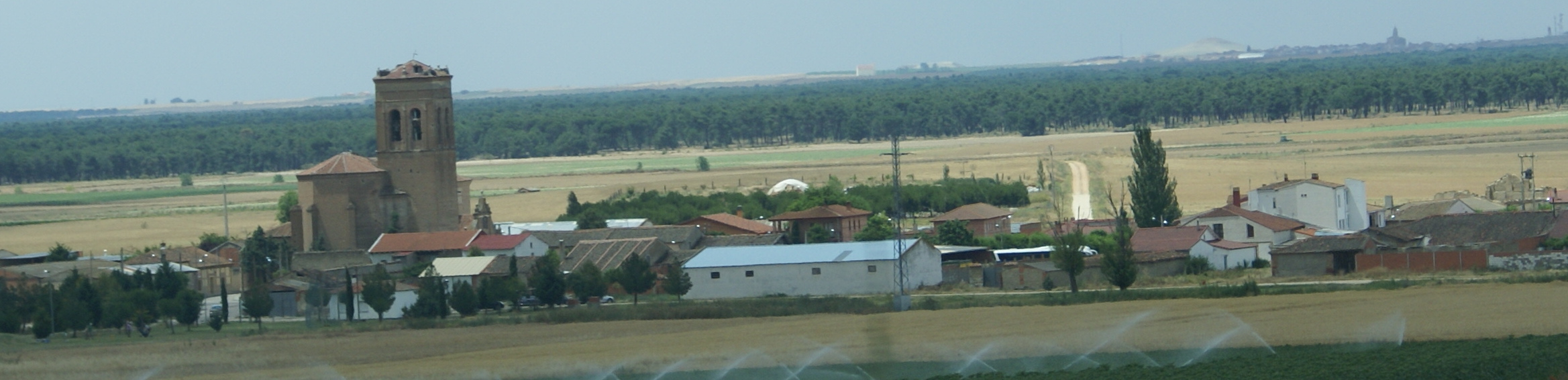
- Panorami view.
- Country: Spain
- Autonomous community: Castile and León
- Province: Valladolid
- Municipality: Bocigas

Area
  - Total: 16 km^{2} (6.2 sq mi)

Population (2025-01-01)
  - Total: 75
  - Density: 4.7/km^{2} (12/sq mi)
- Time zone: UTC+1 (CET)
  - Summer (DST): UTC+2 (CEST)

Bocigas is a municipality located in the province of Valladolid, Castile and León, Spain. According to the 2004 census (INE), the municipality has a population of 129 inhabitants.
