= Geria =

Coordinates: 41°35′N 4°52′W

Geria, Spain
- Flag Coat of arms

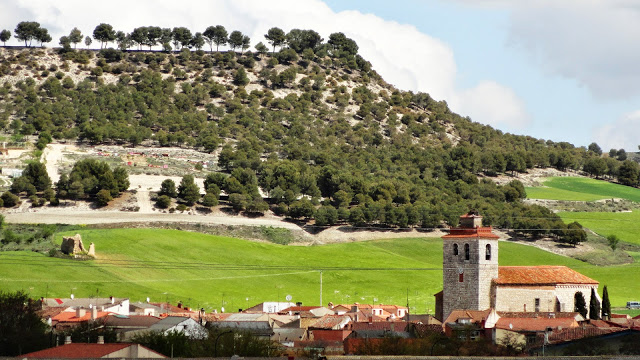
- Church of Nuestra Señora de la Asunción
- Country: Spain
- Autonomous community: Castile and León
- Province: Valladolid
- Municipality: Geria

Area
  - Total: 18 km^{2} (6.9 sq mi)

Population (2025-01-01)
  - Total: 492
  - Density: 27/km^{2} (71/sq mi)
- Time zone: UTC+1 (CET)
  - Summer (DST): UTC+2 (CEST)

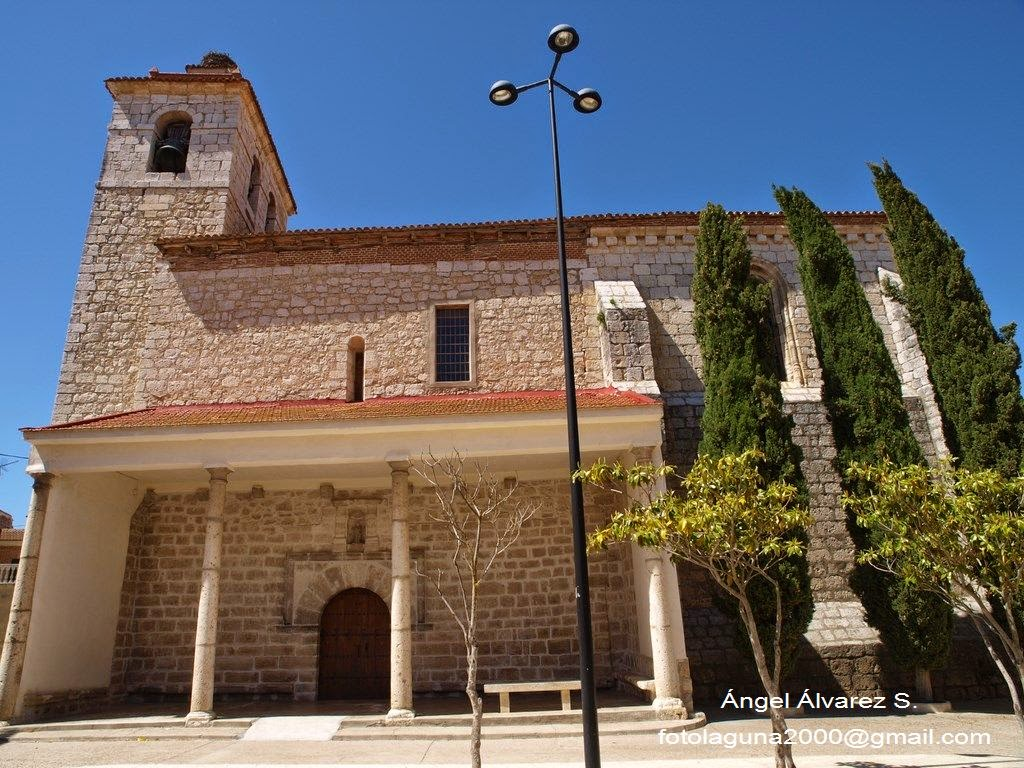
Geria

Geria is a municipality located in the province of Valladolid, Castile and León, Spain. According to the 2004 census (INE), the municipality has a population of 520 inhabitants.
