= Velascálvaro =

Coordinates: 41°14′N 4°58′W

Velascálvaro, Spain
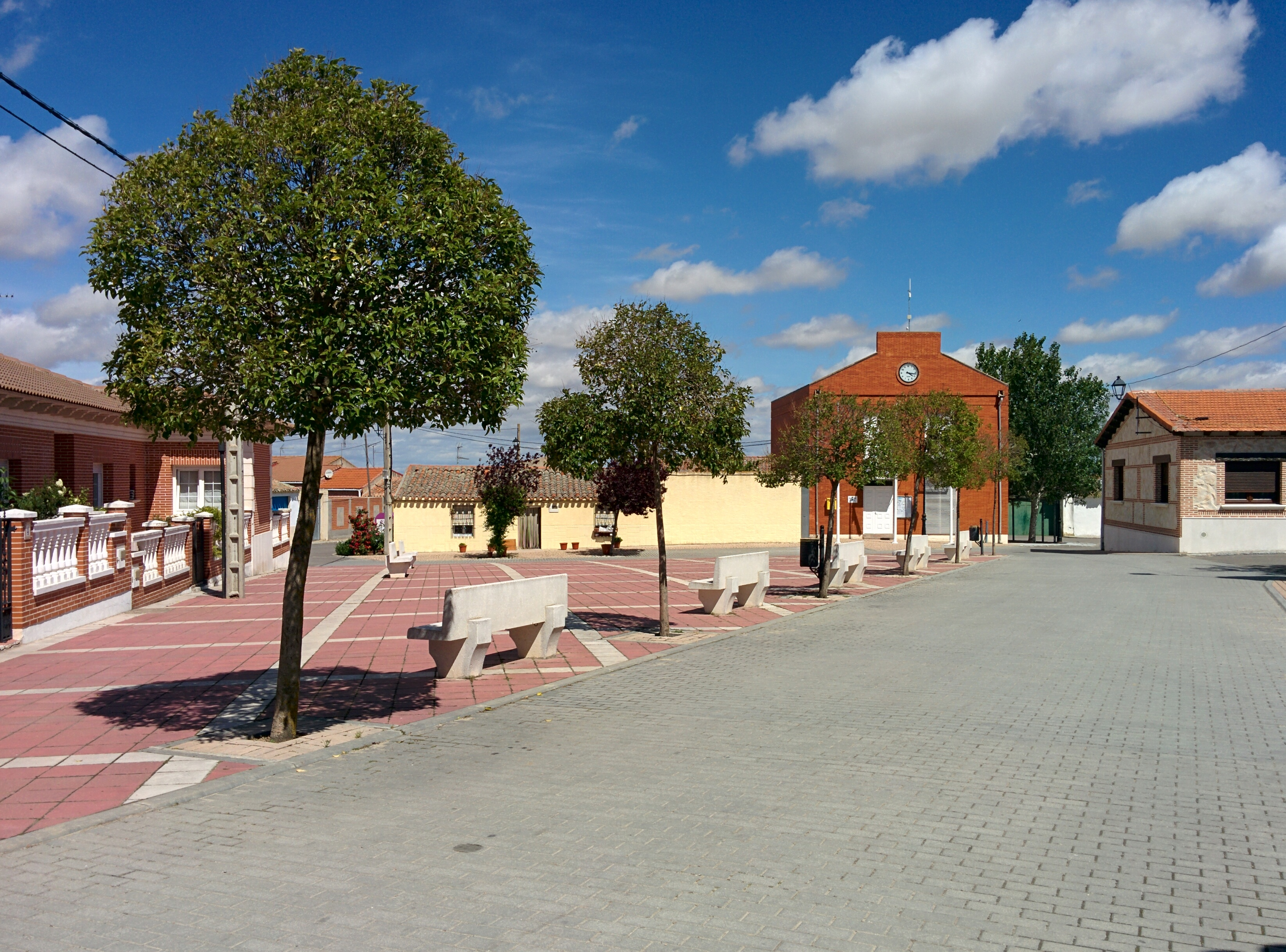
- Plaza in Velascálvaro (Valladolid, España).

- Flag Coat of arms
- Interactive map of Velascálvaro, Spain
- Country: Spain
- Autonomous community: Castile and León
- Province: Valladolid
- Municipality: Velascálvaro

Area
  - Total: 22 km^{2} (8.5 sq mi)

Population (2025-01-01)
  - Total: 156
  - Density: 7.1/km^{2} (18/sq mi)
- Time zone: UTC+1 (CET)
  - Summer (DST): UTC+2 (CEST)

Velascálvaro is a municipality located in the province of Valladolid, Castile and León, Spain. According to the 2004 census (INE), the municipality has a population of 189 inhabitants.
