= Pozal de Gallinas =

Coordinates: 41°19′N 4°50′W

Pozal de Gallinas, Spain
- Flag Coat of arms

- Country: Spain
- Autonomous community: Castile and León
- Province: Valladolid
- Municipality: Pozal de Gallinas

Area
  - Total: 35 km^{2} (14 sq mi)

Population (2025-01-01)
  - Total: 556
  - Density: 16/km^{2} (41/sq mi)
- Time zone: UTC+1 (CET)
  - Summer (DST): UTC+2 (CEST)

Pozal de Gallinas is a municipality located in the province of Valladolid, Castile and León, Spain. According to the 2014 census (INE), the municipality has a population of 538 inhabitants.
