= Piñel de Abajo =

Coordinates: 41°41′N 4°09′W

Piñel de Abajo, Spain
- Coat of arms
- Interactive map of Piñel de Abajo, Spain
- Country: Spain
- Autonomous community: Castile and León
- Province: Valladolid
- Municipality: Piñel de Abajo

Area
  - Total: 21 km^{2} (8.1 sq mi)

Population (2025-01-01)
  - Total: 165
  - Density: 7.9/km^{2} (20/sq mi)
- Time zone: UTC+1 (CET)
  - Summer (DST): UTC+2 (CEST)

Piñel de Abajo is a municipality located in the province of Valladolid, Castile and León, Spain. According to the 2004 census (INE), the municipality has a population of 194 inhabitants.

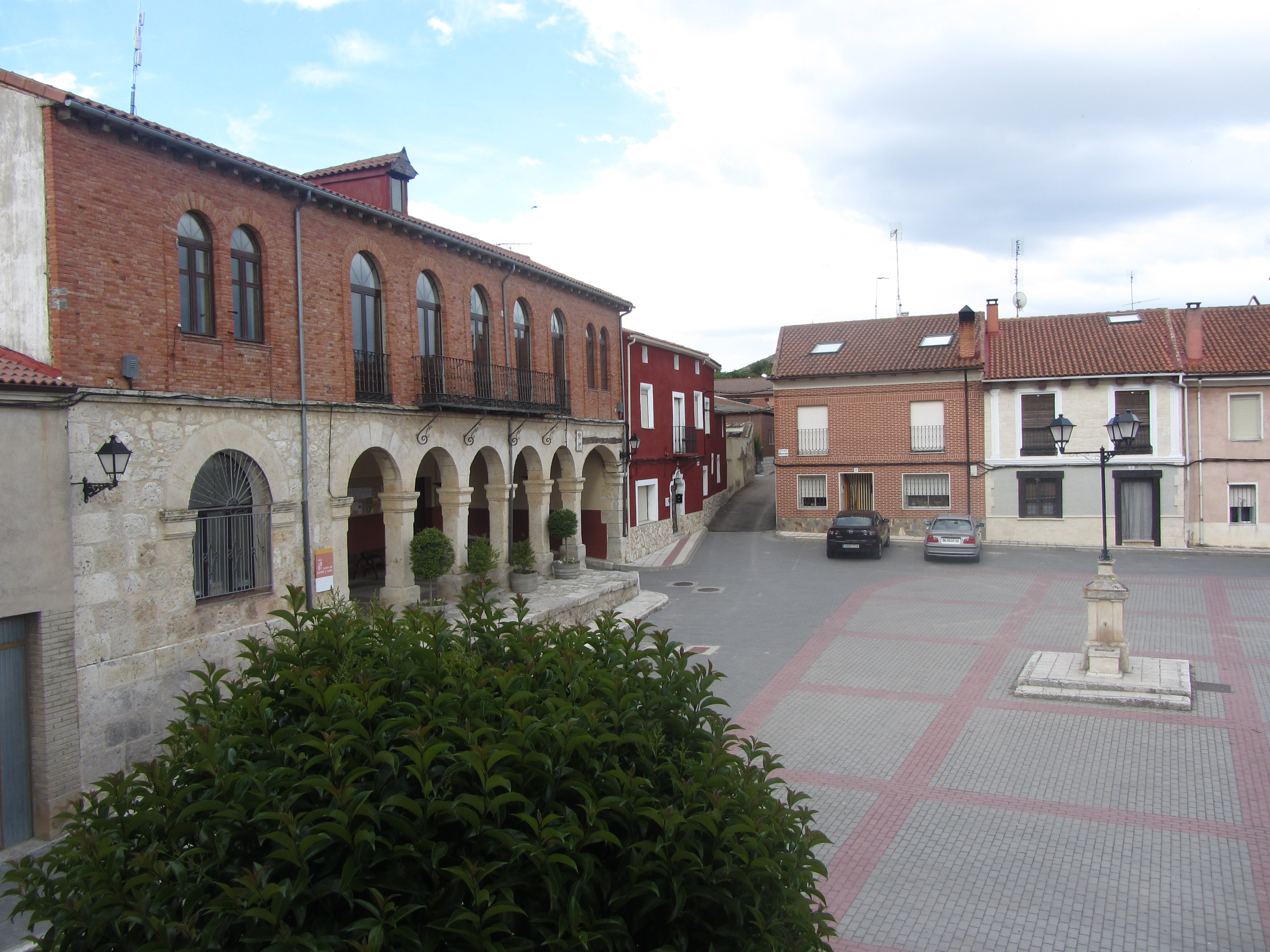
Piñel de Abajo Town Hall Building
