= Berceruelo =

Coordinates: 41°35′N 5°02′W

Berceruelo, Spain
- Coat of arms

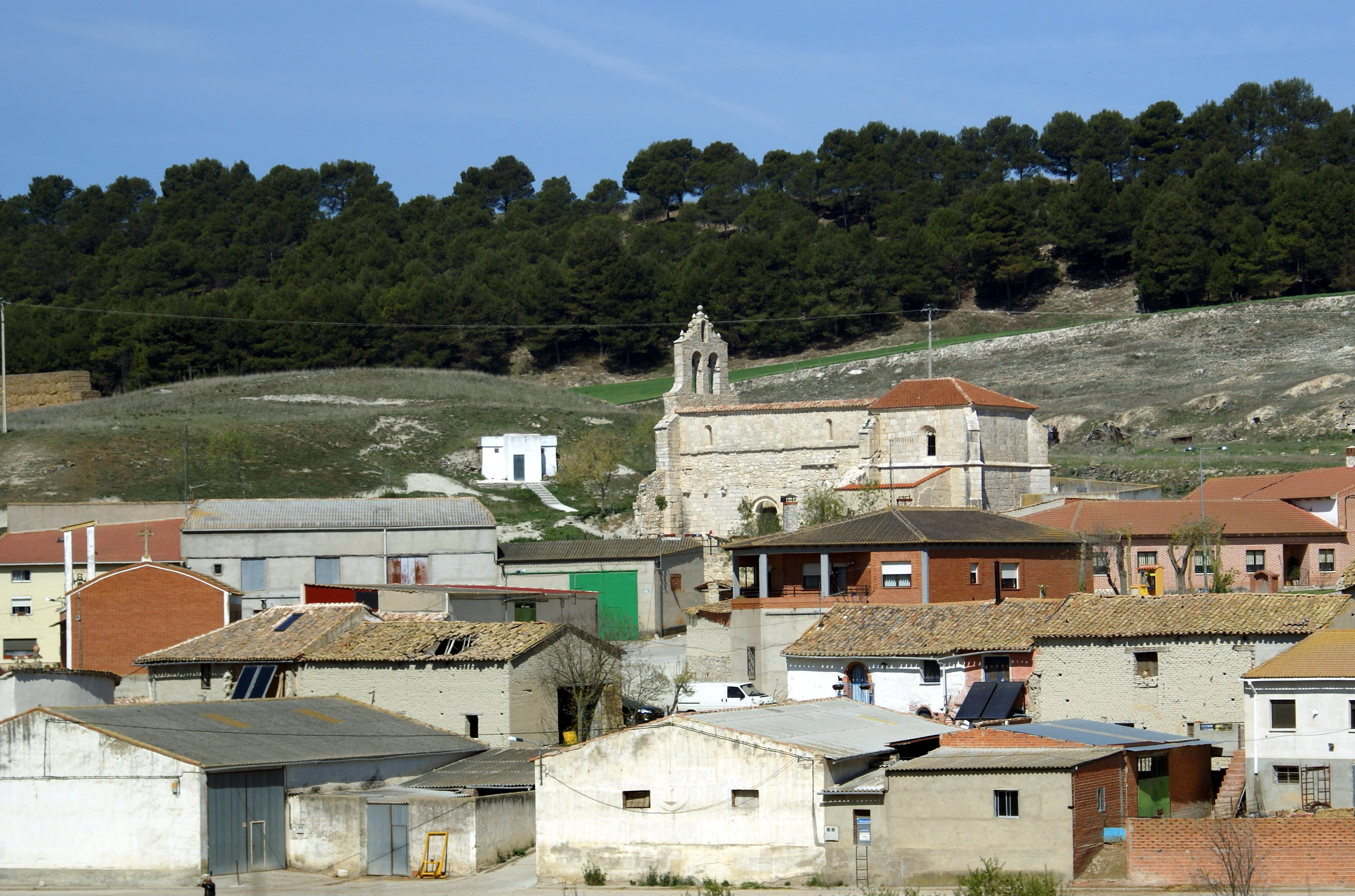
- Panoramic view
- Country: Spain
- Autonomous community: Castile and León
- Province: Valladolid
- Municipality: Berceruelo

Area
  - Total: 13 km^{2} (5.0 sq mi)

Population (2025-01-01)
  - Total: 36
  - Density: 2.8/km^{2} (7.2/sq mi)
- Time zone: UTC+1 (CET)
  - Summer (DST): UTC+2 (CEST)

Berceruelo is a municipality located in the province of Valladolid, Castile and León, Spain. According to the 2004 census (INE), the municipality has a population of 41 inhabitants.
