= San Vicente del Palacio =

Coordinates: 41°13′N 4°51′W

San Vicente del Palacio, Spain
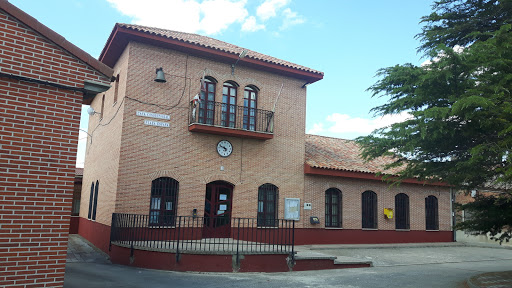
- view
- Country: Spain
- Autonomous community: Castile and León
- Province: Valladolid
- Municipality: San Vicente del Palacio

Area
  - Total: 37 km^{2} (14 sq mi)

Population (2025-01-01)
  - Total: 155
  - Density: 4.2/km^{2} (11/sq mi)
- Time zone: UTC+1 (CET)
  - Summer (DST): UTC+2 (CEST)

San Vicente del Palacio is a municipality located in the province of Valladolid, Castile and León, Spain. According to the 2004 census (INE), the municipality has a population of 232 inhabitants.
