= Amusquillo =

Coordinates: 41°45′N 4°18′W

Amusquillo, Spain
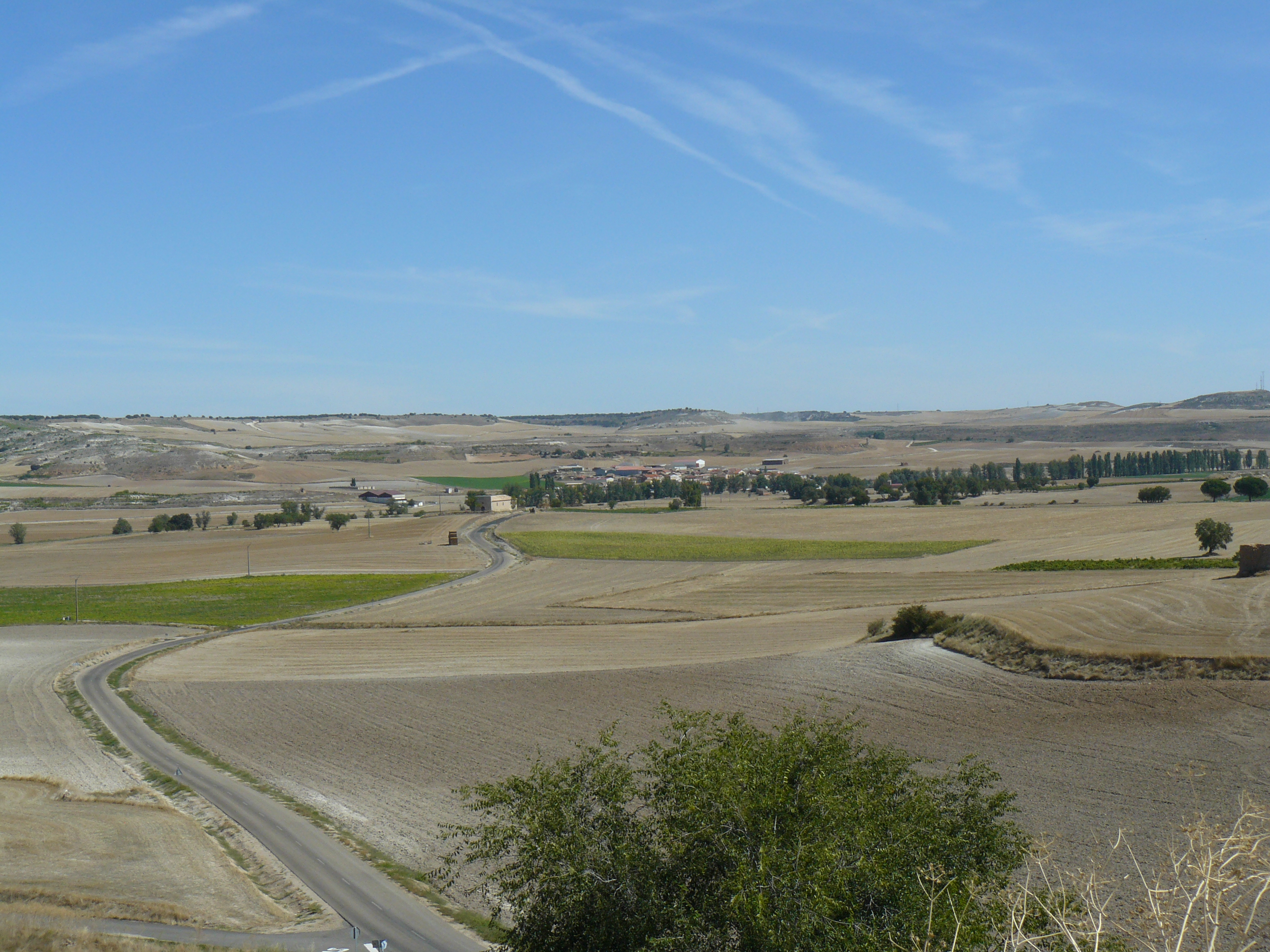
- panoramic view
- Country: Spain
- Autonomous community: Castile and León
- Province: Valladolid
- Municipality: Amusquillo

Area
  - Total: 15.89 km^{2} (6.14 sq mi)
- Elevation: 776 m (2,546 ft)

Population (2025-01-01)
  - Total: 95
  - Density: 6.0/km^{2} (15/sq mi)
- Time zone: UTC+1 (CET)
  - Summer (DST): UTC+2 (CEST)

Amusquillo is a municipality located in the province of Valladolid, Castile and León, Spain. According to the 2004 census (INE), the municipality had a population of 161.

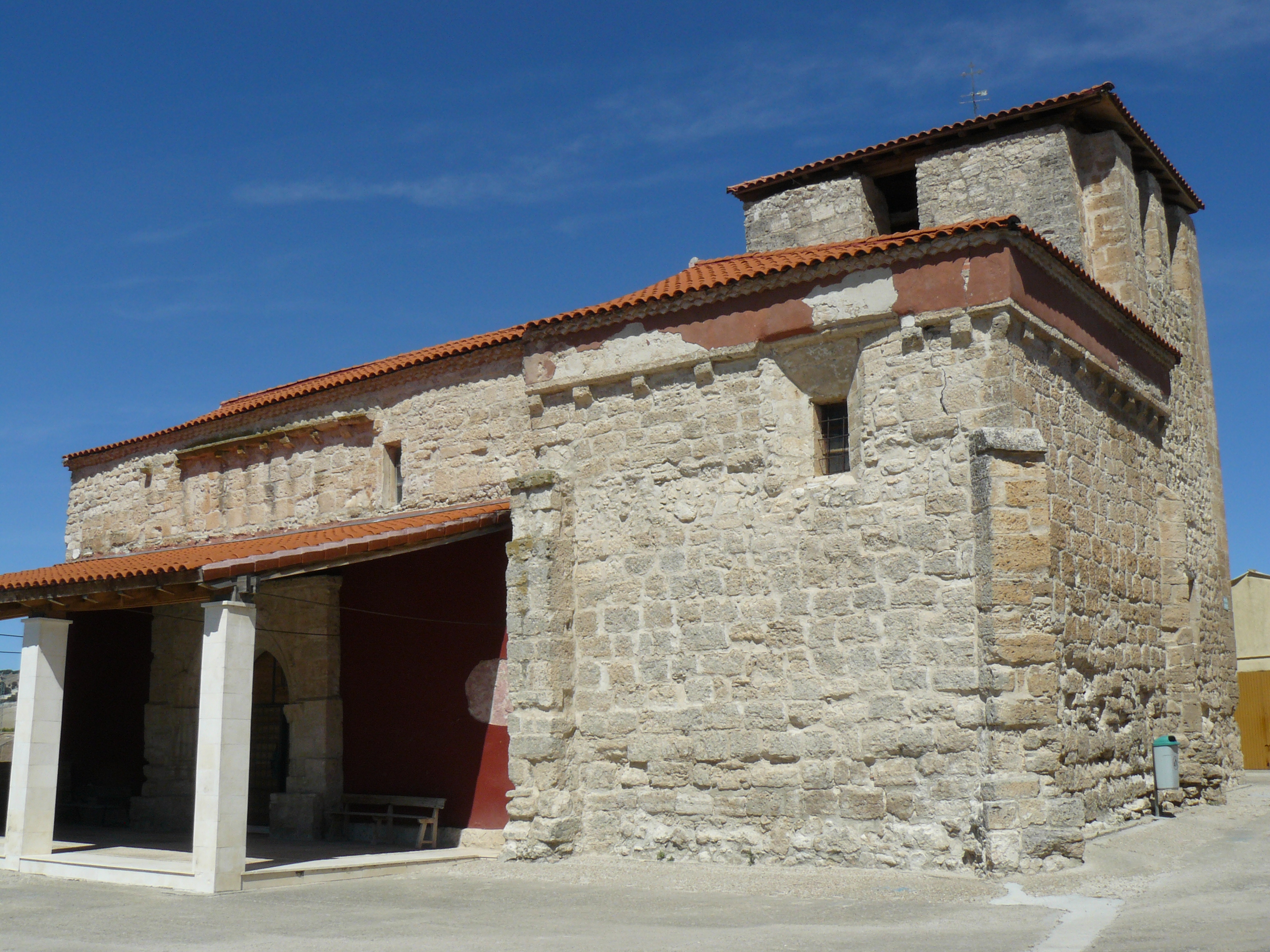
Church in Amusquillo
