= Torre de Peñafiel =

Coordinates: 41°32′N 4°05′W

Torre de Peñafiel, Spain
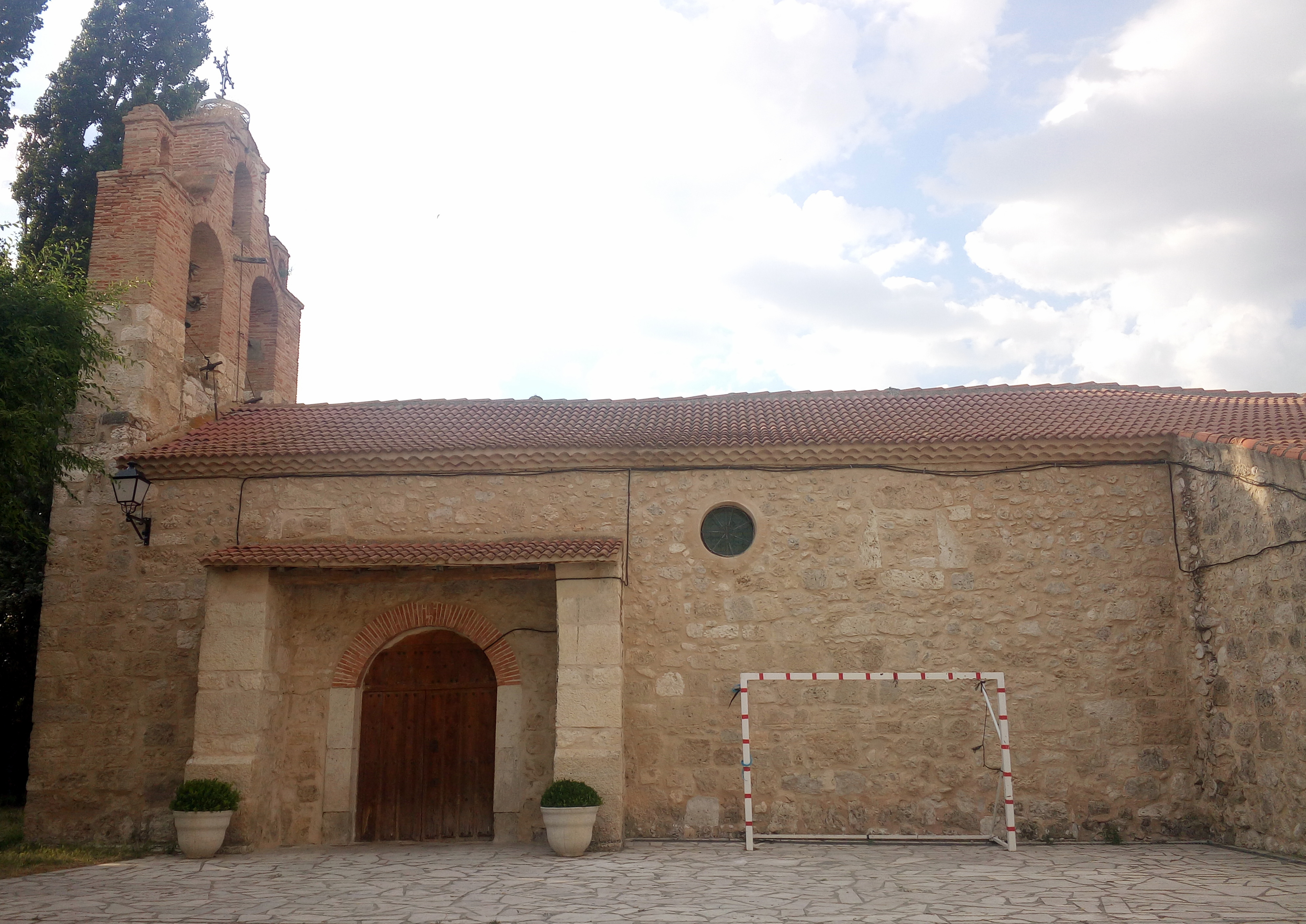
- Church of St. Andrew the Apostle in Torre de Peñafiel, Valladolid, Spain.
- Interactive map of Torre de Peñafiel, Spain
- Country: Spain
- Autonomous community: Castile and León
- Province: Valladolid
- Municipality: Torre de Peñafiel

Area
  - Total: 29 km^{2} (11 sq mi)

Population (2025-01-01)
  - Total: 57
  - Density: 2.0/km^{2} (5.1/sq mi)
- Time zone: UTC+1 (CET)
  - Summer (DST): UTC+2 (CEST)

Torre de Peñafiel is a municipality located in the province of Valladolid, Castile and León, Spain. According to the 2004 census (INE), the municipality has a population of 52 inhabitants.
