= Robladillo =

Coordinates: 41°36′N 4°54′W

Robladillo, Spain
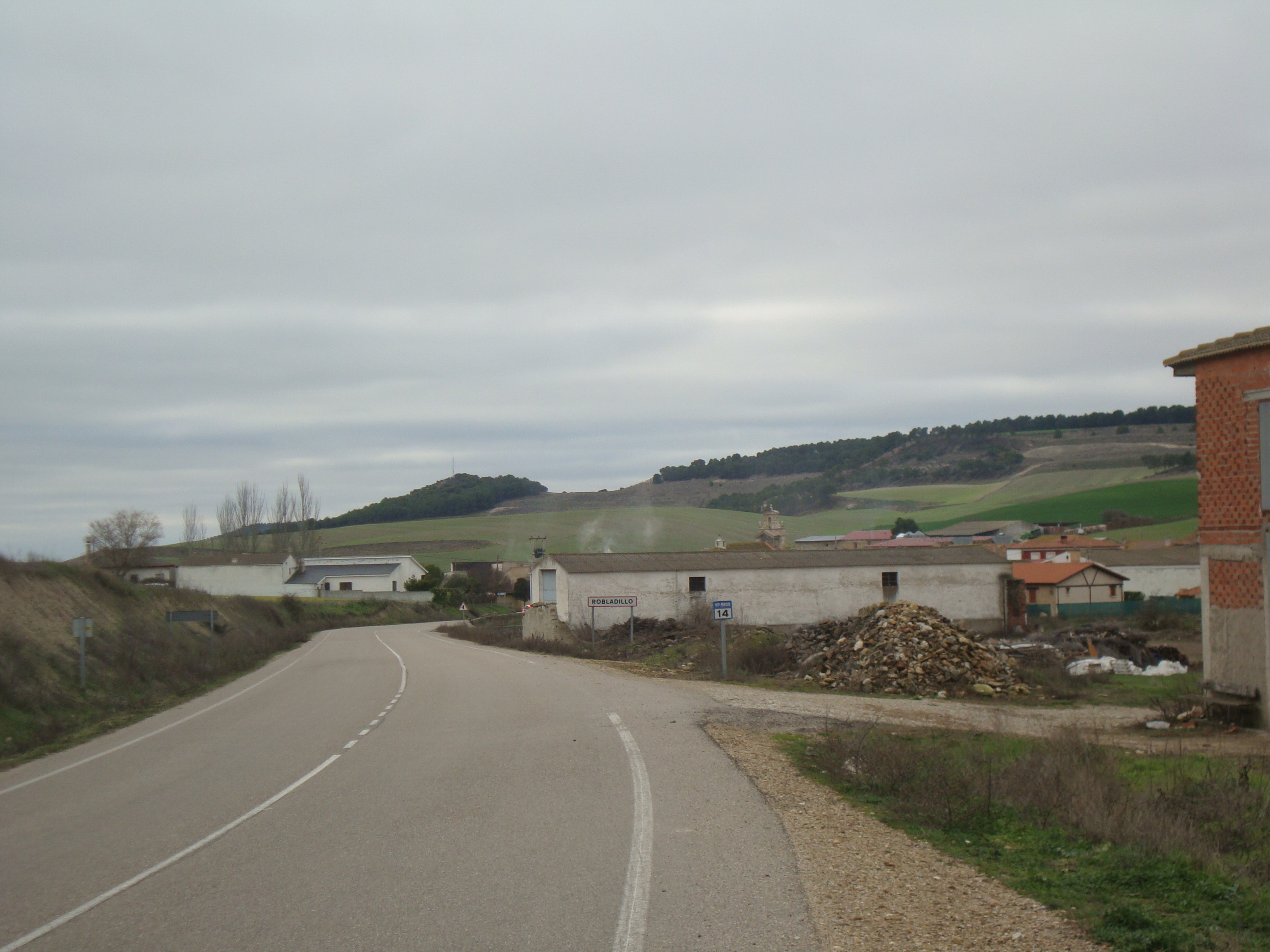
- Interactive map of Robladillo, Spain
- Country: Spain
- Autonomous community: Castile and León
- Province: Valladolid
- Municipality: Robladillo

Area
  - Total: 8 km^{2} (3.1 sq mi)

Population (2025-01-01)
  - Total: 86
  - Density: 11/km^{2} (28/sq mi)
- Time zone: UTC+1 (CET)
  - Summer (DST): UTC+2 (CEST)

Robladillo is a municipality located in the province of Valladolid, Castile and León, Spain. According to the 2004 census (INE), the municipality has a population of 108 inhabitants.
