= Castrillo-Tejeriego =

Village in Spain

Coordinates: 41°42′N 4°22′W

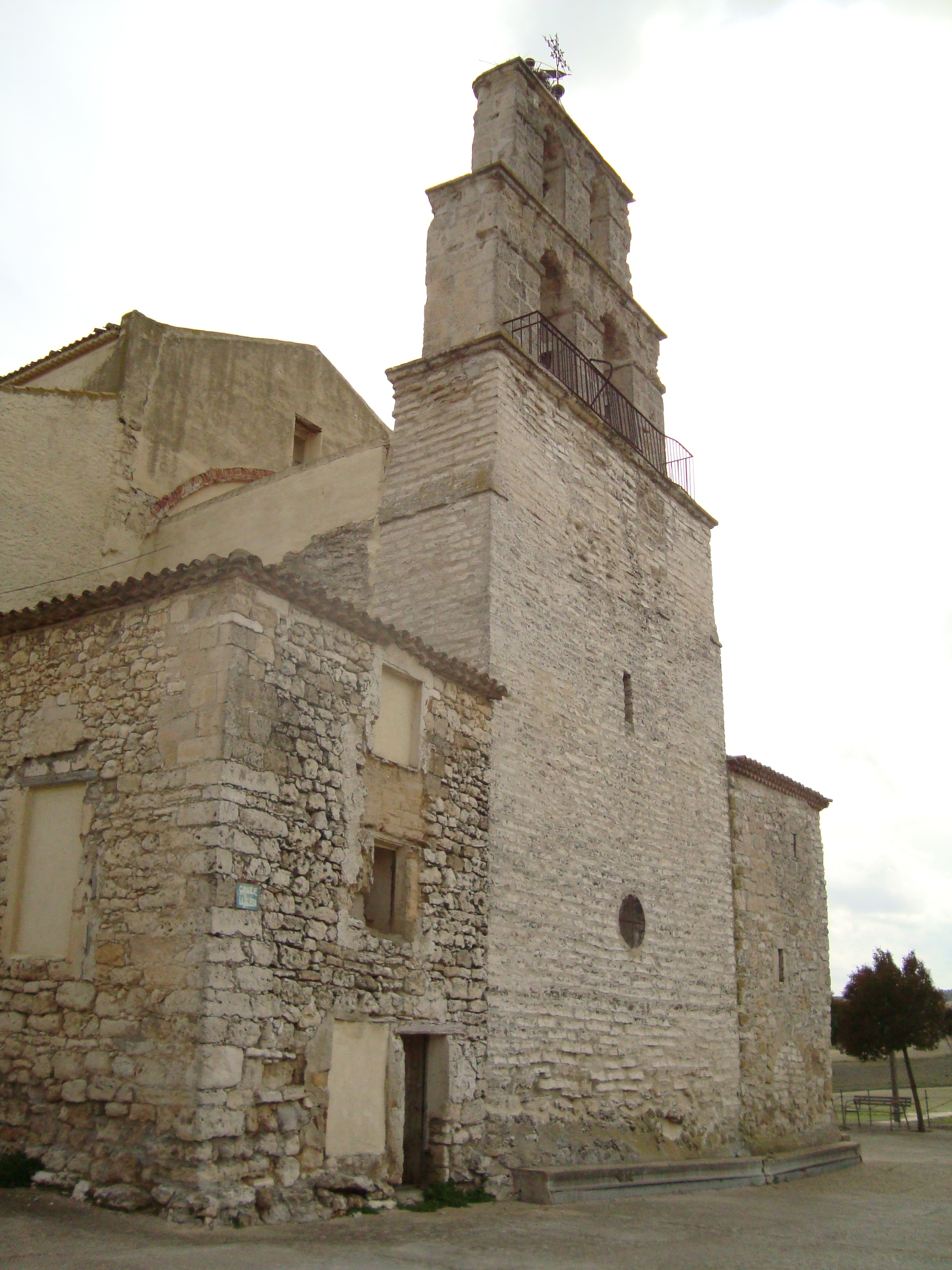

Castrillo-Tejeriego's coat of arms

Castrillo-Tejeriego is a village in Valladolid, Castile-Leon, Spain. The municipality covers an area of 35.98 square kilometres (13.89 sq mi) and as of 2011 had a population of 203 people.
