= Manzanillo, Valladolid =

Village in Valladolid, Castile-León, Spain

Coordinates: 41°35′11″N 4°11′18″W

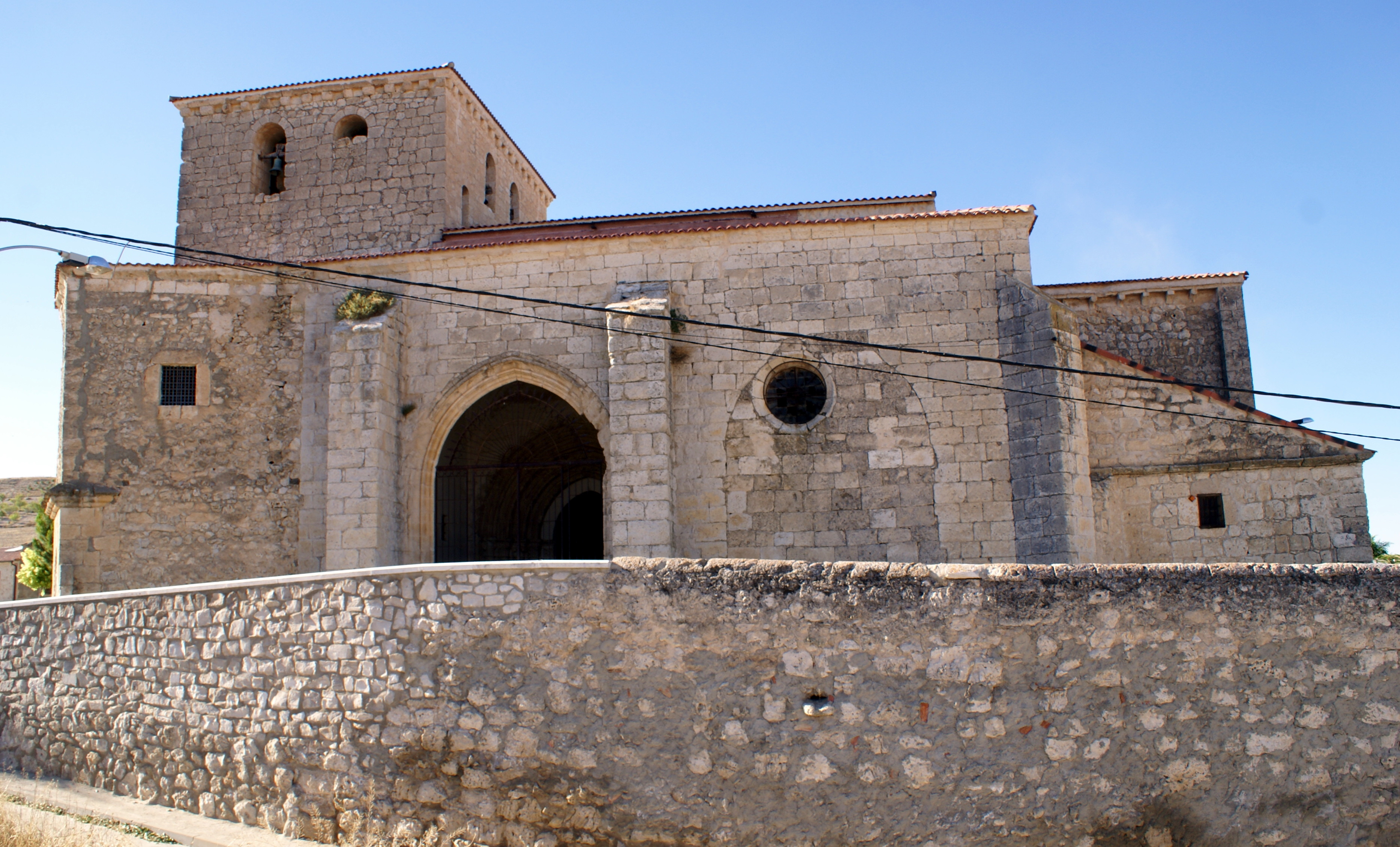

Coat of arms of Manzanillo, Valladolid

Manzanillo is a village in Valladolid, Castile-Leon, Spain. The municipality covers an area of 18.8 square kilometres (7.3 sq mi) and as of 2011 had a population of 67 people.
