= Fompedraza =

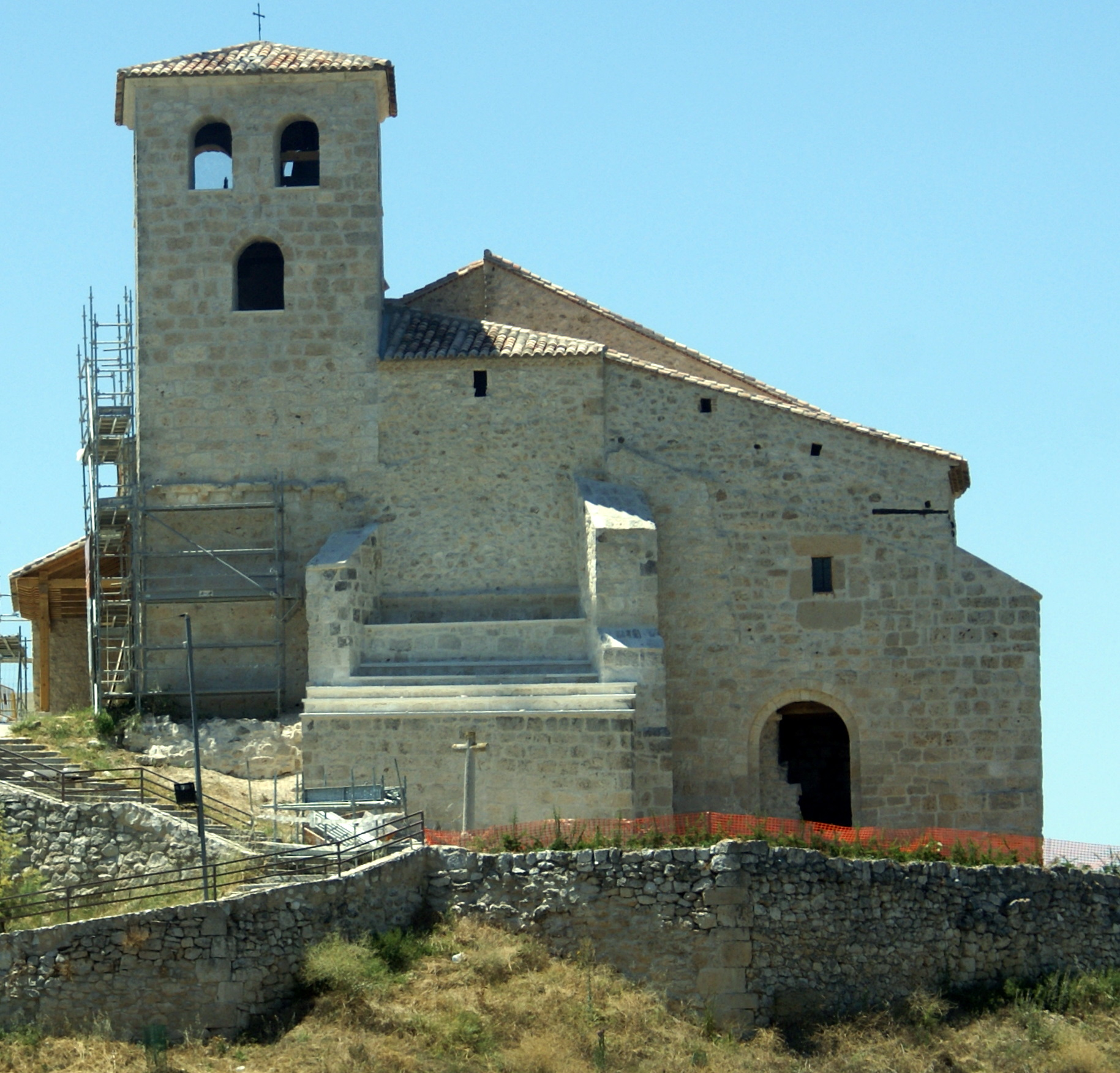
- San Bartolomé Church, built in the 12th century.

- Flag Coat of arms

- Location in Spain.
- Coordinates: 41°32′10″N 4°8′45″W
- Country: Spain
- Autonomous community: Castile and León
- Province: Valladolid
- Comarca: Campo de Peñafiel

Government
  - Mayor: María Amparo Arranz Sanz

Area
  - Total: 16.38 km^{2} (6.32 sq mi)
- Elevation: 889 m (2,917 ft)

Population (2025-01-01)
  - Total: 113
  - Density: 6.90/km^{2} (17.9/sq mi)
- Demonym: Patajas
- Time zone: UTC+1 (CET)
  - Summer (DST): UTC+2 (CEST)
- Postal code: 47311

Fompedraza is a municipality located in the province of Valladolid, Castile and León, Spain. As of 2010(INE), the municipality has a population of 138 inhabitants.
