= Muriel de Zapardiel =

- Municipality
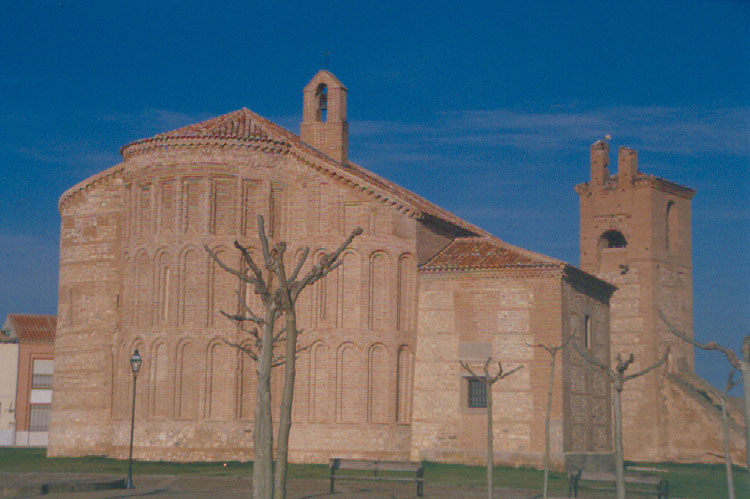
- Church of Nuestra Señora del Castillo

- Location in Castile and León Location in Spain
- Coordinates: 41°7′20″N 4°50′33″W
- Country: Spain
- Community: Castile and León
- Province: Valladolid

Government
  - Alcaldesa: Gabriela Pérez García (PSOE)
- Elevation: 776 m (2,546 ft)

Population (2025-01-01)
  - Total: 106
- Time zone: UTC+1 (CET)
  - Summer (DST): UTC+2 (CEST)
- Postal code: 47219

Muriel de Zapardiel is a municipality located in the province of Valladolid, Castile and León, Spain.

As for its artistic heritage, the Church of Our Lady of the Castle, Mudejar style, built between the twelfth and eleventh centuries, and near it the tower, which is separated from the church. This is because in the Middle Ages, all this set must have belonged to an order of the Templars, and the tower was a watchtower (watchtower) of civilian character, within the order.
