= Military history of the Revolt of the Comuneros =

Military conflict in the Revolt of the Comuneros (Spanish: Guerra de las Comunidades de Castilla) spanned from 1520 to 1521. The Revolt began with mobs of urban workers attacking government officials, grew to low-level combat between small militias, and eventually saw massed armies fighting battles and sieges. The comunero rebels gained control of most of central Castile quite quickly, and the royal army was in shambles by September 1520. However, the comuneros alienated much of the landed nobility, and the nobility's personal armies helped bolster the royalist forces. The Battle of Tordesillas in December 1520 would prove a major setback for the rebels, and the most important army of the comuneros was destroyed at the Battle of Villalar in April 1521.

This article is arranged geographically, and then chronologically within each region. The royalists tended to maintain the same commanders and armies in each area, with the one major exception of when the Constable of Castile moved out of Burgos to unite with the Admiral and crush the Comuneros at Villalar. The Comuneros leaders switched between regions somewhat more, especially Bishop Acuña, but still maintained regional militias ultimately.

The most important fighting of the war, and where the fighting was mostly by organized armies rather than raiding militia bands, took part in the north-central part of the Meseta—Old Castile, which contained the capital of Valladolid, the temporary capital of both sides Tordesillas, and the stronghold of the Admiral of Castile, Medina de Rioseco. Each of these three cities was highly fortified and sought after. A decent amount of combat took place to the north around Burgos and the Basque country as well, where the Constable of Castile vied against Bishop Acuña's raids and the Count of Salvatierra. The southern part of the Meseta, New Castile, was a bastion of comunero support. The royalists never were able to deploy much in the way of armies here, depending on their allies in the Knights of St. John and the local nobility, but some notable events in the war did take place there. The rest of the country was mostly quiet: Andalusia on the southern coast was almost uniformly pro-royalist, as was Extramadura and Galicia.

== Army organization and composition ==
The rebels were strongest in the central plateau of Spain; the royalists controlled Andalusia in the South and Galicia in the North. Aragon was distracted by the Revolt of the Brotherhoods, and Navarre was occupied by Castilian troops who guarded against the return of the Navarrese king and the French. Rebel cities are in purple; Royalist cities are in green; cities with both elements present or that vacillated are in both colors.

=== Comunero forces ===
The comuneros generally drew their strength from the cities and the urban militias to form their armies. They also aggressively recruited former royal guards who had deserted due to low pay, especially veterans of recent campaigns in Africa such as the Djerba campaign. With the central cities of Castile on their side, no expensive foreign entanglements to fund, and a tendency to loot and repossess property of the opposed nobility, the rebels were well-funded.

However, the lack of noble support meant that cavalry were difficult to find. Additionally, the city dwellers the comuneros recruited often lacked much appreciation for the peasantry, and for some actively looked down upon them. The countryside was initially strongly pro-comunero, but the ravages of the comunero army would eventually cost them some support.

The comunero army also struggled from factionalism from within, and the lack of a clear commander-in-chief. Each militia was generally loyal to its home city first, and only marched with a main comunero army given permission. When Pedro Girón was appointed commander of the army by the Santa Junta, they made it clear that he would only directly control forces recruited by himself and the small army loyal to the Junta. Juan de Padilla withdrew his Toledo militia in protest of losing the appointment. When Padilla later came to take the position, he had better luck in convincing the various militias to follow him, but this was more due to his popularity than his authority.

The need to constantly search out new towns and manors to sack and pillage also made slower or defensive strategies difficult for the comuneros to implement. Whenever the army defended one place and retrenched, some militias would often separate and return home. This would require new recruitment to make up the loss, and thus the army was less experienced than it could have been.

=== Royalist forces ===
The royalist-aligned forces consisted of two groups: the royal army, a national army that answered to the Regents, and the independent armies of the nobles. Part of the reason the government got into the mess to begin with was due to its complete mendacity due to money leaving the kingdom to pay foreign debts. The royal administration, and thus its army, suffered from a crippling lack of funding the entire war. Even after the war, some royal guards who had defected reported laughing at those who had followed the king, saying that "while the comunidad paid them every day, their opponents were not so well paid." In the later conflict against the French in Navarre, an army even mutinied after being given only a month's worth of pay when owed four months of back pay.

The royalist cause's most important allies were the landed nobility, many of whom threw their allegiance behind King Charles after seeing the comuneros support peasant rebellions against them. They offered a powerful combination of militarily experienced commanders, disciplined troops, and expensive horse cavalry. However, they were also unreliable. Many nobles' first goal was to protect their own lands, and crushing the rebellion but losing their own holdings would be a loss. As such, the Regents often had difficulty rallying the noble forces to make a combined army. After the victory at Toredesillas, for example, many royal guards were dismissed due to lack of funds to pay them, and many noble-controlled armies returned to their home areas, greatly endangering the defense of Tordesillas and preventing any new offense.

After the burning of Medina del Campo, the royalist cause had to struggle with negative perceptions from the populace. As such, the royalists took considerably greater precautions than the comuneros to avoid enraging the countryside. For most battles, the royalist troops were forbidden from looting captured cities for income. This caused considerable dissatisfaction among the ranks and exacerbated the problem of the low pay for the soldiers, but also saved the royalist cause from even further distaste from the populace. The commanders of the royal army were also brave enough to dismiss unnecessary additional troops. Untrained peasant levies were unlikely to be very effective on the battlefield, but would be additional bellies to feed and could easily offend the countryside with undisciplined looting.

Loyalty was an additional concern that the royalist cause faced. New recruits from the cities of the Meseta were unlikely to be terribly loyal, and might even leak information. As a result, the royalist armies generally used poor Galicians from the North for additional troops.

== Andalusia: The Southern coast ==
In general, Andalusia was fairly quiet during the war. A variety of reasons exist for this. Among the nobles, there was a great investment in the project of Hispanicizing the recently conquered Granada and its Moriscos. It was crucial for the government to act unified to maintain stability; if some cities of Andalusia were to join the Comunidades and others not, a civil war among the Spanish Christians would invite a revolt among the Moriscos. The economic situation was different as well; Andalusia was seeing the beginnings of what would become a vast stream of wealth from Spain's overseas trade and conquests. While Andalusia's nobles were still powerful, many opportunities existed for all classes. In the Meseta, the bourgeoise and lower classes had tasted prosperity for a time under Isabella, but had seen their gains fade in the past twenty years, which fed bitterness at the nobility and helped spark revolts. Furthermore, Andalusia simply did not see the change in government in the two Castiles as necessarily their concern. With the slower and less frequent travel of the day, some in Andalusia simply thought the matter did not concern them, and if the Castiles wished a new government that did not necessarily have any bearing on Andalusia.

The towns in the north of Andalusia in the mountains, away from the coast, were more connected with the Castiles. Jaén, Úbeda, and Baeza all favored the Comunidades during the early stages of the revolt. Once the Andalusian nobles got word of this, they sent a sizable force to retake these small cities for the king. The Captain-General of Granada, who was also the Marquis of Mondéjar and Count of Tendilla (same person bearing all three titles), led a force of some 1,500 men in September to retake Jaén. He executed the three leading members of the Comunidad there, lashed others, and then pardoned the rest of the town. Murcia also joined the Comunidades, but eventually came back to the royal forces much later and by persuasion rather than force.

In coastal Andalusia, there was sporadic discontent, but few attempted rebellions. Two notable attempted rebellions occurred in Seville, but nothing much came of either one. The first was led by Juan de Figueroa, a member of the powerful Ponce family. On Sunday, September 16, he proclaimed the Comunidad and took over the lightly fortified Alcázar of Seville. The rebellion was quickly crushed the next day by the Duke of Medina-Sidonia, a member of the rival Guzmán family, and Figueroa was lightly wounded. The incident was treated as a youthful indiscretion, and Figeruoa quickly pardoned, leading some historians to treat the matter as simply the latest grab for power between the two feuding noble houses. A later attempt, la Feria y Pendón Verde ("The Fair and the Green Flag") led by lower classes, seemingly confirms this explanation. The nobility of both houses united to put down the riots, which lasted three days, suggesting the first revolt was more about which noble house would have power.

To coordinate their activities, the towns of Andalusia received permission from the government to set up their own Congress at Rambla. They had requested it on October 24, 1520, and actually convened the assembly on January 20, 1521. The Rambla Congress admonished towns to return to the royal government and organized a military force of 4,000 infantry and 800 cavalry to be ready should the need to quickly suppress a Morisco rebellion arose. Still, the Rambla Congress worried some royalists in the Meseta, as should the war turn against the royal government, it would provide an easy mechanism for Andalusia to coordinate itself and defect as one (removing the worries of a civil war giving the Moriscos an opening). The Admiral of Castile wrote to King Charles that:

"Andalusia has assembled at Rambla and we know not to what end. If we had authority to hold Cortes and they declared themselves deputies, on the plea that we desired to discuss the welfare of the realm, the cities which acknowledge [you] as sovereign and the provinces will be pacified, in view of the fact that we showed willingness to discuss the general interest. Since that is not the case and these revolutionary folk tell them we desire not the good but the ruin of the realm, they believe them. This make me fear lest from this junta some harm develop; and if Andalusia rises the whole realm is lost."

— Fadrique Enríquez, Admiral of Castile

As the war never significantly turned against the royal government, the Admiral's fears were not realized. Andalusia also sent an army off to intervene in the Revolt of the Brotherhoods. The Andalusian army helped turn the tide against the rebels there by winning the Battle of Oriola in crushing fashion.

== Old Castile: Valladolid and the Center of the Meseta ==
Old Castile was where the majority of the large battles of the war took place. The area around Tordesillas, Valladolid, and Medina de Rioseco was particularly contested - the three most decisive battles of the war, Tordesillas, Torrelobatón, and Villalar all took place in this area.

=== Battle of Tordesillas ===
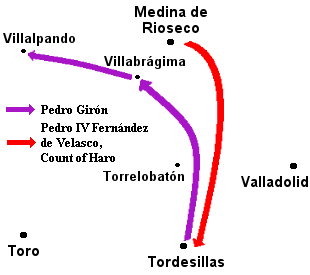
The royal army, commanded by the Constable of Castile's son, the Count of Haro, consisted of 6,000 infantry, 2,100 cavalry, and 12–15 artillery pieces. Pedro Girón's rebel force was larger but slower, with 10,000 infantry, 900 cavalry, and 13 artillery pieces. The rebels' deficiency in cavalry would hurt them throughout the war.

In late November 1520, both armies took positions between Medina de Rioseco and Tordesillas, and a confrontation was inevitable. With Pedro Girón in command, the army of the comuneros advanced on Medina de Rioseco, following the orders of the Junta. Girón established his headquarters in Villabrágima, a town merely 8 kilometres (5.0 mi) from the royalist army. The royalists occupied nearby villages to cut communication lines back to other comuneros.

This situation continued until December 2, when Girón, apparently thinking the royal army would remain entrenched,^{[note c]} moved his forces west to the small town of Villalpando. The town surrendered the next day without resistance, and the troops began looting the estates in the area. However, with this movement, the comuneros left the path to Tordesillas completely unprotected. The royal army took advantage of the blunder, marching by night on December 4 and occupying Tordesillas the next day. The small rebel garrison was overwhelmed.

Seizure of Tordesillas marked a serious defeat for the comuneros, who lost Queen Joanna and with her their claim to legitimacy. In addition, thirteen representatives of the Junta were imprisoned, though others fled and escaped. Morale fell among the rebels, and much angry criticism was directed towards Pedro Girón for his maneuvering of the troops out of position and for his failure to attempt to retake Tordesillas or capture Medina de Rioseco. Girón was obliged to resign from his post and withdrew from the war. Juan de Padilla returned from Toledo to be appointed the new Captain-General of the comunero forces.

After the triumph in Tordesillas, Cardinal Adrian had to face the continuing paucity of funds in the royal coffers and the fickleness of his noble allies. Many nobles returned with their armies to their domains to guard them against the continuing peasant revolts that were breaking out. The treasury situation had deteriorated to the point that some soldiers had to be released for lack of funds to pay them. As a result, Adrian, the Count of Haro, and the Admiral were able to do little but fortify their holdings, and not attempt any further advances.

=== Battle of Torrelobatón ===
With the royal forces stationary, Padilla moved to attack. On February 21, 1521, the siege of Torrelobatón began. Outnumbered, the town nevertheless resisted for four days, thanks to its walls. The Count of Haro sallied forth from Tordesillas with his cavalry in an attempt to aid the besieged, but he had brought too few cavalry, and he did not engage Padilla or his forces. On February 25, the comuneros entered the town and subjected it to a massive looting spree as a reward to the troops. Only churches were spared. The castle resisted for another two days. The comuneros then threatened to hang all of the inhabitants, at which point the castle surrendered. The defenders did secure an agreement to spare half of the goods inside the castle, thus avoiding further looting.

The victory in Torrelobatón lifted the spirits of the rebel camp while worrying the royalists about the rebel advance, exactly as Padilla hoped. The faith of the nobles in Cardinal Adrian was once again shook, as he was accused of having done nothing to avoid losing Torrelobatón. The Constable of Castile began to send troops to the Tordesillas area to contain the rebels and prevent any further advances.

=== Interim maneuvers ===
Despite the renewed enthusiasm among the rebels, a decision was made to remain in their positions near Valladolid without pressing their advantage or launching a new attack. This caused many of the soldiers to return to their home communities, tired of waiting for salaries and new orders.

In late March 1521, the royalist side moved to combine their armies and threaten Torrelobatón, a rebel stronghold. The Constable of Castile began to move his troops (including soldiers recently transferred from the defense of Navarre) southwest from Burgos to meet with the Admiral's forces near Tordesillas. This was possible due to the comunero-aligned Count of Salvatierra's force being caught up in the siege of Medina de Pomar; the Count's forces had previously been enough of a threat to force the Constable to maintain a large army to defend Burgos. The Constable's army was approximately 3,000 infantry, 600 cavalry, 2 cannons, 2 culverin, and 5 light artillery pieces. His army took up positions in Becerril de Campos, near Palencia. Meanwhile, the comuneros reinforced their troops at Torrelobatón, which was far less secure than the comuneros preferred. Their forces were suffering from desertions, and the presence of royalist artillery would make Torrelobatón's castle vulnerable. They had two strategic possibilities: prevent the Constable and Admiral from united their forces by striking at the Constable while he was still on the field, or else low-level harrying operations to try to slow the Constable down. The comuneros did neither, and thus allowed the Constable to approach nearly unchecked.

=== Battle of Villalar ===
The advance of the royalist armies was known to the rebels. The commander of the comunero armies, Juan de Padilla, considered withdrawing to Toro to seek reinforcements in early April, but wavered. He delayed his decision until the early hours of April 23, losing considerable time and allowing the royalists to unite their forces in Peñaflor.

The combined royalist army pursued the comuneros. Once again, the royalists had a strong advantage in cavalry, with their army consisting of 6,000 infantry and 2,400 cavalry against Padilla's 7,000 infantry and 400 cavalry. Heavy rain slowed Padilla's infantry more than the royalist cavalry and rendered the primitive firearms of the rebels' 1,000 arquebusiers nearly useless. Padilla hoped to reach the relative safety of Toro and the heights of Vega de Valdetronco, but his infantry was too slow. He gave battle with the harrying royalist cavalry at the town of Villalar. The cavalry charges scattered the rebel ranks, and the battle became a slaughter. There were an estimated 500–1,000 rebel casualties and many desertions.

The three most important leaders of the rebellion were captured: Juan de Padilla, Juan Bravo, and Francisco Maldonado. They were beheaded the next morning in the Plaza of Villalar, with a large portion of the royalist nobility present. The remains of the rebel army at Villalar fragmented, with some attempting to join Acuña's army near Toledo and others fleeing to Portugal.

== Navarre ==
In early May, a large French/Navarrese army crossed the Pyrenees and attacked the Spanish-occupied portion of Navarre. If the comuneros had held out slightly longer, it might have saved them, but by the time of the invasion the Battle of Villalar had already happened. Instead of an opportunity to win the war, the invasion instead became a way for former comunero cities nervous about potential reprisals to prove their loyalty by sending large contingents to fight the French and Navarrese. An even larger Castilian army attacked the French and crushingly defeated them at the Battle of Noáin on June 30, 1521.
