= Battle of Tordesillas (1520) =

Battle in Spain

- Part of Revolt of the Comuneros
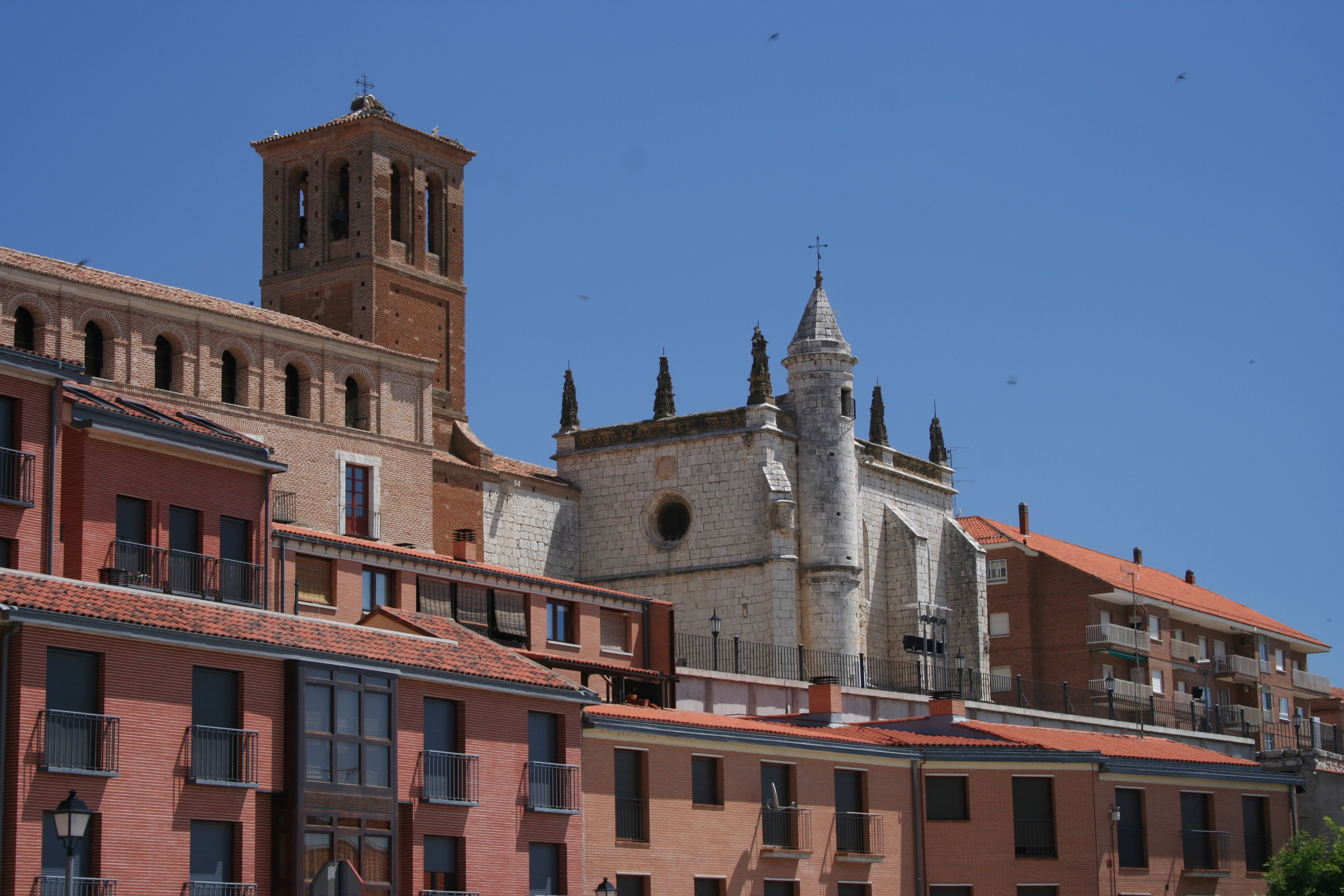
- View of Tordesillas, site of the battle
Date	December 5, 1520
Location	Tordesillas, province of Valladolid (Spain)
Result	Royalist victory

Belligerents
Comuneros	Royalists

Commanders and leaders
Pedro Girón y Velasco; Suero del Águila Luis de Quintanilla	Constable of Castile, Count of Haro Admiral of Castile

Strength
4,000 infantrymen 180 spears	± 7,000 infantrymen ± 2,000 spears 20 artillery pieces

Casualties and losses
Unknown	50, including dead and injured
- Consequences: Valladolid becomes the new headquarters of the Santa Junta.; Guadalajara and Soria abandon the comunero side.; Pedro Girón y Velasco resigns from his position as captain general.

The Battle of Tordesillas was an armed conflict fought during the Revolt of the Comuneros, that engaged the royalist forces commanded by the Count of Haro and the comuneros garrison of the Valladolid town of Tordesillas, the headquarters of the rebels, on December 5, 1520.

At the end of November the army of the Santa Junta, led by Pedro Girón y Velasco, had advanced towards Medina de Rioseco, establishing its headquarters in the town of Villabrágima, only a league away from the royal army. This one, composed fundamentally of contingents provided and commanded by the nobility, was limited to occupy towns to avoid the advance and to cut the lines of communication.

The situation was maintained until December 2, when the rebel army left Villabrágima for Villalpando. With this movement the route to Tordesillas —headquarters of the Junta and residence of Queen Joanna the Mad— was left unprotected, so the royal army took advantage of the occasion and on December 4 headed out. The following day the army attacked the city and after a long and hard fight with the defensive garrison, it was able to seize the city.

On the political level, the occupation of Tordesillas was a major defeat for the comuneros, who lost Queen Joanna, and with her, their hopes that she would heed their claims. In addition, many of the procurators were imprisoned, and those who were not, had fled. On the military level, the angry criticism towards the General-in-chief Pedro Girón due to the movement of the troops, forced him to resign from his post and withdraw from the conflict, which in turn produced important desertions in the bulk of the comuneros troops.

The nobles, on the other hand, did not take advantage of the victory. Deeply divided, with scarce numbers, and fearing reprisals from the comuneros within their fiefdoms, they limited themselves to establishing garrisons in some strategic places, after which they discharged most of the troops and returned to their domains.

== Prelude ==
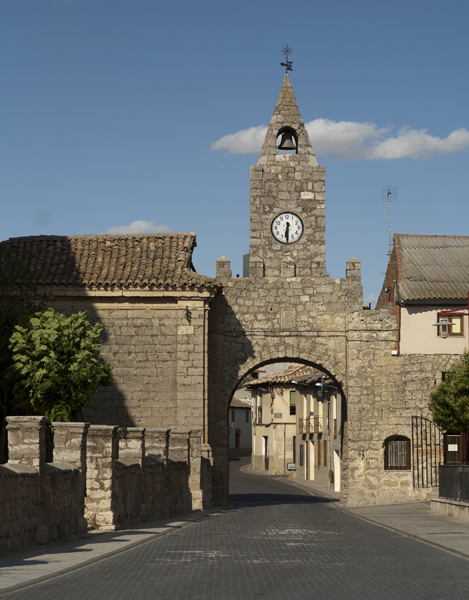
Wall of Villabrágima, place occupied by Pedro Girón at the end of November

At the end of November 1520 the Captain General of the Santa Junta, Pedro Girón y Velasco, (Note: The nobleman Pedro Girón y Velasco had joined the comunero movement in October, apparently because of the monarch's refusal to hand over to him the duchy of Medina Sidonia.(Pérez (1977, p. 239) He was the son of Juan Téllez-Girón, 2nd Count of Ureña and Leonor de la Vega Velasco (daughter of the 2nd Count of Haro).) mobilized the bulk of his army towards Villabrágima, at the same time that other smaller detachments occupied Villafrechós, to the north, Tordehumos, to the southwest and Villagarcía de Campos and Urueña, to the south. In this way the distance between the troops of the lords, grouped in Medina de Rioseco, was shortened to a league and hostilities seemed inevitable. However, the nobles commanded by the Count of Haro refused to take the initiative. They only limited themselves to impede the enemy's advance and cut their lines of communication by occupying towns such as Mota del Marqués, San Pedro de Latarce, Castromonte or Torrelobatón.

What was actually happening was that the royalist side was deeply divided over the right course of action. On the one hand, the regent Adrian and his collaborators insisted that a rapid and withering attack should be carried out against the comuneros; they were convinced that their troops were far superior to those of the rebels. The nobles, on the other hand, saw this position as very risky because the enemy was solidly entrenched in Villabrágima and because, in addition, the vineyards on the left bank of the Sequillo River were impassable terrain for the cavalry, on which their forces were mainly based, but perfect for the rebels' infantry.

However, their particular interests were also at stake in this problem. Above all, the lords feared to provoke a greater anti-seignorial reaction in their domains if they openly confronted the comuneros. Equally revealing are the declarations of Admiral Fadrique Enríquez de Velasco —since September Viceroy of Castile along with Adrian and the Constable—, who rejected the idea of fighting in his own fiefdom, on the banks and plain of the Rioseco.

As the days went by, the verbal confrontations between the two sides became particularly harsh. The Count of Benavente even went so far as to mock the intellectuals, the leaders who pretended to give lessons in strategy:

He said that if they put a dotor and a bachelor tied to each banner of those who were going to fight, he would be the one to fight the battle, and not in any other way.

— Letter from Hernando de la Vega to the Constable, dated December 1, 1520.

The rest of the nobles were equally disturbed:

Since the Lord Count de Haro came until today [December 1] there has been talk and dispute as to whether the battle should be fought or garrisons should be placed, the Lord Cardinal and some who advised him, who are among those who will not fight, have been and are in favor of there being a battle in any case, and the Cardinal spoke to the Admiral and the Count of Venavente and other captains in this matter, so that it seemed to them that they were touched something in their honor and they became angry, while the Admiral spoke a few heated words.

— Letter from Hernando de la Vega to the Constable, dated December 1, 1520.

== Armies ==
Although it is not possible to know the exact number of soldiers for each of the armies —we must not forget that contingents were being added all the time— it is possible to get an idea of the ratio of forces based on the letters dated in the days prior to the battle.

Letter	Date	Royalist Army	Comunero Army
From the Admiral of Castile to Seville	November 28	7,000 infantry, 300 men-at-arms, 300 light horses, 400 horsemen and 20 pieces of artillery	4,000 infantry, 400–500 lances and 6 pieces of artillery.
From the Vozmediano brothers to the king	November 29	8,000 infantrymen and 2,000 lances	4,000 infantrymen and 400 lances, although they expected important reinforcements.
From Lope Hurtado to the king	November 29	5,000 infantrymen and 1,600 lances	7,000 infantrymen and 600 lances
From Hernando de la Vega to the condestable	December 1		Speaks of 4 thick pieces of artillery, 2 cannons, 2 or more culverins and 6 or 7 pieces of falconets.
From Vargas to the king	December 4	6,500 infantrymen and 2,200 lances	9,000 infantrymen and 900 lances

=== Royalist army ===
Commanded by the Count of Haro, the royalist army was made up mainly of infantrymen recruited by the nobles in noble lands, especially from Navarre, Galicia and Asturias, and part of the veterans of the Djerba expedition. Obviously, the troops of Antonio de Fonseca —licensed in August after the fire of Medina del Campo— and the urban militias could not be counted on, either because they were under the control of the rebels or because there was a certain reluctance to make the loyal cities fight with their brethren. At one point, the incorporation of three thousand German mercenary soldiers into the king's ranks was also considered, although this plan did not materialize in the end.

As for the artillery, it was obtained from Navarre and Fuenterrabía, but at the cost of leaving the French border unguarded. At the end of November it was placed under the direction of the mayor of Pamplona, Miguel de Herrera.

=== Comunero Army ===
The comunero army was made up mainly of urban militias contributed by the cities most committed to the movement: Valladolid (where all the males between eighteen and sixty years of age were mobilized), Toledo, Segovia, etc. Together with these forces (which by November had been organized and paid their salaries), there was also the other part of the Djerba veterans, who had accepted to join Pedro Girón through the emissary Carlos Arellano, as well as the peculiar battalion of Antonio de Acuña, bishop of Zamora, made up of around 300 armed priests.

As for artillery and armament in general, the rebels could easily obtain it from Medina del Campo, Castile and the Basque Country.

== Battle ==
=== First troop movements ===
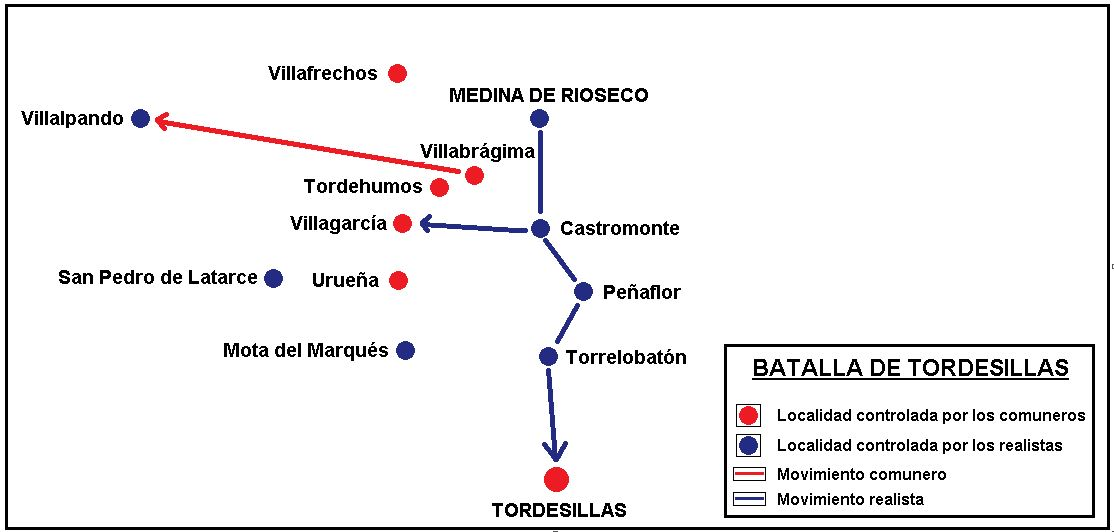
Map of the battle of Tordesillas

The situation continued until December 2, when the rebel army began to abandon its positions in Villabrágima and moved towards Villalpando, the locality of the Constable, which surrendered the following day without resistance. At first, the lords considered the possibility of liberating the town by moving their troops to Castroverde de Campos, but finally decided to seize Tordesillas, whose route had been liberated thanks to the movement of Girón to the west.

On the 4th the army of lords marched towards the city, occupying the villages abandoned by the comuneros almost without resistance. There were only a few skirmishes in Villagarcía, (Note: In the occupation of this town the first contingent that entered -—and thanks to which it could be conquered— was the one led by Captain Valdés. For this service the Castilian Admiral recommended him to the king on December 27, 1520.(Danvila y Collado (1897–1900, p. 675) Vol. 2.)) but Castromonte, Peñaflor and Torrelobatón fell without difficulty.

=== Fall of Tordesillas ===
On December 5 the first detachments reached Tordesillas at ten o'clock in the morning. Three hours later the Count of Haro appeared with the rest of the men and by means of a king of arms, two trumpets and a secretary of the admiral addressed to the city an ultimatum, which the comuneros asked for a time limit to answer. Above all, they were trying to make the royalists lose time while they awaited the arrival of reinforcements. The Count insisted with a new request but as this time the answer was negative, at half past three in the afternoon, after an intense artillery fire, he gave the order to begin the assault. The garrison of 80 lances and 400 infantrymen —some of whom were the priests of Zamora— defended themselves fiercely with Luis de Quintanilla from Medina at the head. On several occasions certain lords even suggested the idea of retreating ("alzar el combate", Spanish for "to cease the combat"), but in the end there was no need to reach this point.

After an hour of uncertain confrontation, an infantryman of Gómez de Santillán, according to some, or the artilleryman Miguel de Herrera, according to others, (Note: I [Santillán] made a infantryman dig through some walls with a hoe that I gave him. He did so well that he soon made a hole through which the town was entered. — Letter from Gómez de Santillán to Cardinal Adriano, dated December 9, 1520. (Danvila y Collado (1897–1900, p. 697) Vol. 2.) The Knight Commander of Castile sent to know if Herrera could make a hole through which the infantry could enter. He answered that he would if he had half an hour slowly, and even one through which men-at-arms could enter; and he was so clever that he had not finished saying this, when he had already made a porthole. — Letter of the Count of Haro to the king, dated January 16, 1521. (Danvila y Collado (1897–1900, p. 42) Vol. 3.)) managed to open a gate in the wall and the attackers were able to enter the city, although the comuneros then prevented their advance by setting fire to the surrounding houses. (Note: Seven infantry flags entered through this gate. According to an anonymous manuscript of the time, an ensign of the Count of Alba climbed the wall and placed a flag on top of it to indicate that this was the entrance.(Danvila y Collado (1897–1900, p. 701) Vol. 2.)) Fire was also sighted on the other side of the Douro:

After a long time, some fires appeared on the other side of the river, and since we could not have any warning of what it was, we thought it was people from the Junta because they never ceased to repel and make explosions in the place.

— Letter from the Count of Haro to the Constable, dated December 5, 1520.

It was only at dusk when the attackers entered definitively in Tordesillas; first the soldiers of the Count of Benavente, then those of the Count of Alba de Liste and later followed by those of Astorga and Haro. Even so, the resistance did not cease, since the royalists had to fight in the streets hand to hand with the defenders, amid the ringing of bells and the glow of the fires. Captain Suero del Águila, for his part, came quickly from Alaejos with 100 lances, but the enemy's army was too superior to face it effectively without Pedro Girón's forces. He was finally taken prisoner along with Colonel Gonzalo Palomino. At that time a new breach was also made in the wall to allow the entry of artillery and infantry.

Around eight o'clock at night the last pockets of resistance gave way and the soldiers surrendered to pillage, from which only the churches, convents and the residence of Queen Joanna were spared. Even the saddle of the Infanta Catherine of Austria was stolen. Of course, the nobles were disgusted by this behavior, but they claimed that they had not been able to control their men. The Count of Benavente went further and in addition to punishing some of the soldiers, he promised compensation for the residents of Tordesillas, albeit at the expense of the State.

If we base ourselves on the affirmations of the royal secretary Lope Hurtado, the royalist side suffered only fifty casualties, between dead and wounded. This figure could be revised as it is too small for the characteristics of the fight described above, especially considering that witnesses report that the combat lasted approximately six hours. It is also recorded that the Count of Benavente was hit in the arm, his son in the leg and Luis de la Cueva in the face.

On the same day of the battle, December 5, the Admiral and the Count of Benavente sent a report to Charles V, giving him a detailed account of the personalities who had participated in the battle, among them: the Counts of Haro, of Benavente, of Alba de Liste, of Luna, of Miranda, the Marquises of Astorga and those of Denia, Diego de Rojas, Juan Manrique —son of the Duke of Nájera—, Beltrán de la Cueva —first-born son of the Marquis of Aguilar—, Pedro Osorio, Pedro de Bazán, Juan de Ulloa, Francisco Enríquez, the adelantado of Castile, —brother of the admiral—, Diego Osorio, Luis de la Cueva, etc.

== Matter of Girón ==
There is some controversy among historians when it comes to determine if with his movement from Villabrágima to Villalpando the captain of the comunero army, Pedro Girón, intended to betray the rebel cause or simply ignored the error at the time of committing it.

The chronicler Pedro de Alcocer believes that Girón did indeed betray the comuneros:

He [Girón] wrote to the Constable, his uncle, and to the Admiral that he would win pardon from the King and that he would deliver him to Tordesillas and the Queen.

— Pedro de Alcocer, Relación de algunas cosas...

Pedro Mexía also considers this theory probable but prefers not to make a categorical statement about it:

Something [Girón's betrayal] that I do not know for sure I do not dare to affirm, although there was no lack of evidence to believe it.

— Pedro Mexía, Relación de las Comunidades de Castilla.

The bishop and historian Prudencio de Sandoval, for his part, offers two explanations to the problem. The first refers that Antonio de Acuña —the famous bishop from Zamora— and Girón were having dinner together with the Admiral and the Count of Benavente in Villabrágima when these two gentlemen pretended to join the side of the Junta, thus encouraging the comunero leaders to go against the Constable and attack Villalpando. This is more than implausible, judging by the fact that it seems almost impossible that Acuña and Girón would take their naivety to such an extreme. The second hypothesis, of course, is treason. In fact, the chronicler is surprised that Acuña —who was not part of the plot— would have agreed to his colleague's military maneuver:

And Don Pedro Giron took up residence in the houses of the Constable, his uncle. All they say was by agreement and double deal, and it was good to see, because they left the enemy free, and in Villalpando there was nothing to do. From Don Pedro Giron the deal could be feared, because the great ones, his relatives, pulled him a lot, as will soon be seen. What is frightening is that the bishop of Zamora (who was not in the deal), did not give in to it, but was always so black and hard, that it cost him his life, losing it miserably tied to a stick.

— Prudencio de Sandoval, Historia de la vida y hechos del Emperador Carlos V.

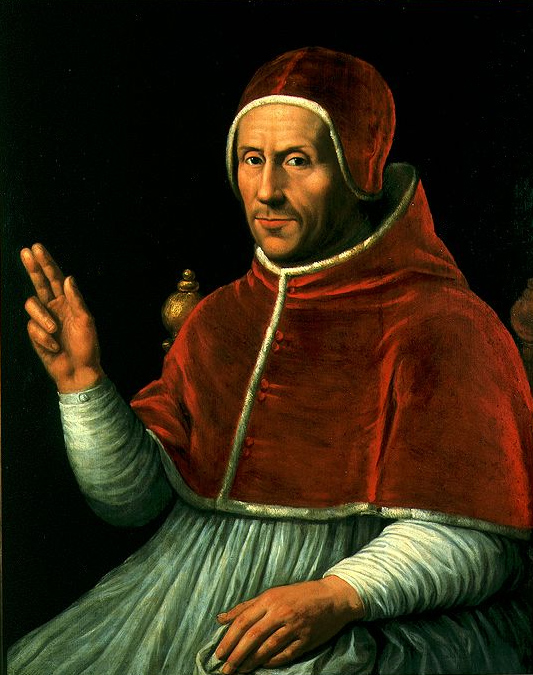
Portrait of Adrian of Utrecht, thanks to whom on December 5 the nobles decided once and for all to attack Tordesillas

But the name most cited in these debates is undoubtedly that of Antonio de Guevara. In his so-called razonamiento de Villabrágima (Spanish for reasoning of Villabrágima), he claims to have convinced Pedro Girón himself to abandon the rebel movement. The captain of the comuneros, disturbed by the intransigence of his colleagues, would then have accepted the proposal of his interlocutor and agreed to head towards Villalpando, so that the lords could take over Tordesillas without problems. There are many doubts about the authenticity of the famous razonamiento but, otherwise, there is no solid evidence to affirm that Girón's contacts with the enemy would have prospered and led to the agreement to which the chronicler refers. In addition, it must be taken into account that Girón, after the battle, did not switch to the royalist side. On the contrary, he agreed to go to Valladolid, the new capital of the movement, to continue the fight; an attitude that would hardly fit with that of a traitor. And if he finally resigned his post on December 15, it was not because the leading figures on the comunero side distrusted him, but because he was overwhelmed by the rumors that were circulating among the soldiers. After this episode the viceroys made him numerous proposals, but he declined them, which also means that his collaboration with the lords was not agreed upon beforehand.

In 1977 the Hispanist Joseph Pérez offered a different explanation to that of the chroniclers. According to him, both Girón and the Junta committee that accompanied him moved their troops to Villalpando because they were confident that the lords would not decide to abandon Medina de Rioseco. And what is more, once the maneuver was completed, the military leaders of the royalist army continued to doubt about the conduct to follow, whether to recover the fief of the Constable or to attack Tordesillas. If they finally opted for the latter option, it was not because it was the most interesting, but because the exhortations of Cardinal Adrian, in such a favorable situation, prevented de facto any other movement.

Moreover, Pedro Girón was not the only one accused of treason. The men from Medina also made threats against the commander of the defensive garrison of Tordesillas, the Knight Commander Luis de Quintanilla.

== Consequences ==
The siege of Tordesillas by the royalists had important political and military consequences, but in no way put an end to the insurrection. In fact, all the Coetano testimonies agree, to the surprise of the royal power, that the defeat served to further inflame the rebels, who began to indignantly denounce the conduct of the nobility and some of them, the most radical, to show a certain willingness to invade their fiefs.

The royalists, on the other hand, did not exploit the victory of Tordesillas but followed the same conduct as at the end of November, that is, they refused to take the initiative on the military level. Nor should it be forgotten that the nobles hindered the struggle by putting their own interests before those of the king and the state.

=== Comuneros ===
Policies

With the defeat of Tordesillas, the Comuneros lost the possibility of legitimizing their claims under the authority of the queen. In addition, it weakened the Santa Junta numerically, as Soria and Guadalajara did not send representatives and thirteen deputies were taken prisoner during the battle:

- Antonio de Quiñones and Juan de Benavente, attorneys from León.
- Knight Commander Almaraz and Pero Sánchez, procurators of Salamanca.
- Juan de Solier, procurator of Segovia.
- Diego del Esquivel, procurator of Guadalajara.
- Pedro de Sotomayor, procurator of Madrid.
- Doctor Cabeza de Vaca, procurator of Murcia.
- Diego de Montoya, procurator of Toledo.
- Gómez de Ávila, procurator of Ávila.
- Pedro Merino, procurator of Toro.
- Santiago, procurator of Soria.
- Doctor Zúñiga, procurator of Salamanca.

When on December 15 the Junta resumed its sessions in Valladolid —the new capital of the movement— only ten cities were represented: Toledo, León, Murcia, Salamanca, Toro, Segovia, Cuenca, Ávila, Zamora and Valladolid, although days later those of Madrid joined in.

Military

With the occupation of Tordesillas the comunero army lost its leaders. Girón had resigned and Antonio de Acuña soon retired to Toro. Desertions also became very frequent. Thus, at the beginning of January 1521 the Junta had under its command only 3000 infantrymen and 400 lances, that is, half of what it had in November.

It is also true that on January 2, 1521, the Junta approved the recovery of Tordesillas, but the reconquest of the town of Valladolid remained a dead letter. In February, even Juan de Padilla, who had defended this plan at all times, recognized that a royalist detachment in Simancas made the operation very problematic.

=== Royalists ===
Military

After the battle of Tordesillas on December 5, the nobles did not want or did not know how to exploit the victory. The most convenient thing would have been to march on Valladolid, but instead of that, they simply placed garrisons in strategic places: Simancas, Torrelobatón, Castromonte, etc. Subsequently —and this was also influenced by the financial precariousness of the governors—, most of the troops were discharged and the lords all returned to their properties.

Policies

On the political level, the royal side did not have the necessary cohesion to fight against the rebels.

Alongside the admiral, who did not hide his hatred for the Royal Council, were grouped those in favor of a negotiated solution to the conflict; the defenders of the iron fist, on the other hand, were concentrated on the side of the Constable. And from a third position, Cardinal Adrian dedicated himself to criticizing the nobles for acting in accordance with their own particular interests and forgetting those of the king. As Joseph Pérez points out, this factor was crucial so that in December and January the majority of the lords, without taking advantage of the possibilities opened up by the victory of Tordesillas, simply disengaged themselves from the fight against the comuneros:

The lords did not wish to fight because they feared the possibility of reprisals against their fiefs. This explains why the royalist army was content to occupy some strategic positions instead of attempting to deal the coup de grace to the rebellion.

— Joseph Pérez, La revolución de las Comunidades de Castilla.

And the financial issue, for its part, was always precarious for the royalists:

The great shortage of funds of the royalists after the battle of Tordesillas, determined the conservative orientation of the strategy that they adopted throughout the following months. There was simply not enough money to maintain a large shock force, nor even to pay the troops the arrears owed to them.

— Stephen Haliczer, Los Comuneros de Castilla: La forja de una revolución, 1475-1521.

== See also ==
- Revolt of the Comuneros
- Pedro Téllez-Girón

== Bibliography ==
=== Modern works ===
- Pérez, Joseph (1977). La revolución de las Comunidades de Castilla (1520-1521) (in Spanish). Siglo XXI de España Editores. ISBN 9788432302855.
- Danvila y Collado, Manuel (1897–1900). Historia crítica y documentada de las Comunidades de Castilla. A collection of documents, pamphlets, and antiquities published by the Royal Academy of History; 35-40. (in Spanish). Vol. 1–6. Madrid: Memorial Histórico Español.
- Álvarez García, Carlos (1986). "La revolución de las Comunidades de Castilla en Medina del Campo". Historia de Medina del Campo y su tierra (in Spanish). 1: 471–576.
- Haliczer, Sthepen (1981). Los Comuneros de Castilla: la forja de una revolución, 1475-1521 (in Spanish). Universidad. ISBN 9788486192976.

=== Chronicles ===
- Sandoval, Prudencio de (1681). Historia de la vida y hechos del emperador Carlos V (in Spanish). Printed by Geronymo Verdussen.
- Alcocer, Pedro de (1872). Relación de algunas cosas que pasaron en estos reinos desde que murió la reina católica Doña Isabel, hasta que se acabaron las comunidades en la ciudad de Toledo (in Spanish). Spanish and Foreign Printing and Bookstore of D. Rafael Tarascó.
- Mexía, Pedro (1985). Relación de las Comunidades de Castilla (PDF). Industrias Gráficas M. Pareja Montaña. ISBN 8486335043. Archived from the original (PDF) on 3 February 2012.

=== Publications ===
- Pérez, Joseph (1965). "Le razonamiento de Villabrágima". Bulletin Hispanique (in Spanish). 67 (3): 217–224. doi:10.3406/hispa.1965.3842.
