= Adalia, Valladolid =

Adalia
- Coat of arms

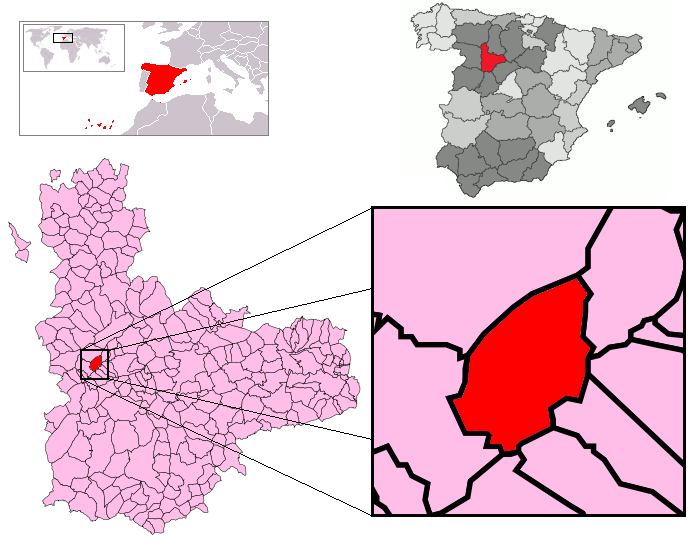
- Adalia in Valladolid Province

- Location in Spain Adalia (Spain)
- Coordinates: 41°38′55″N 5°7′8″W
- Country: Spain
- Autonomous community: Castile and León
- Province: Valladolid
- Comarca: Montes Torozos

Government
  - Mayor: Jesús Fernández

Area
  - Total: 16.19 km^{2} (6.25 sq mi)
- Elevation: 784 m (2,572 ft)

Population (2025-01-01)
  - Total: 50
  - Density: 3.1/km^{2} (8.0/sq mi)
- Postal code: 47129
- Area code: 983

Adalia is a village and municipality in the province of Valladolid, Castile and León, central Spain. The municipality covers an area of 16.19 square kilometres (6.25 sq mi) and as of 2011 had a population of 58 people.

== Geography ==
This municipality is located in a vale. It belongs to the Comarca of Montes Torozos and borders San Cebrián de Mazote, Barruelo del Valle, Villasexmir, San Salvador, Gallegos de Hornija, Vega de Valdetronco, and Mota del Marqués municipalities. The Retortero and Darzuela streams run across it, and its maximum altitude lies at mount Atalaya, with 830m.

== History ==
The village was formerly walled. It was owned by the bishop of Palencia and the Order of San Juan. It was named Adella by the Order. The main activity two centuries ago was the harvesting of wheat and barley, as well as canvas bleaching.

== See also ==
- Towns in Spain
