= Pedro Téllez-Girón, 3rd Count of Ureña =

Spanish noble

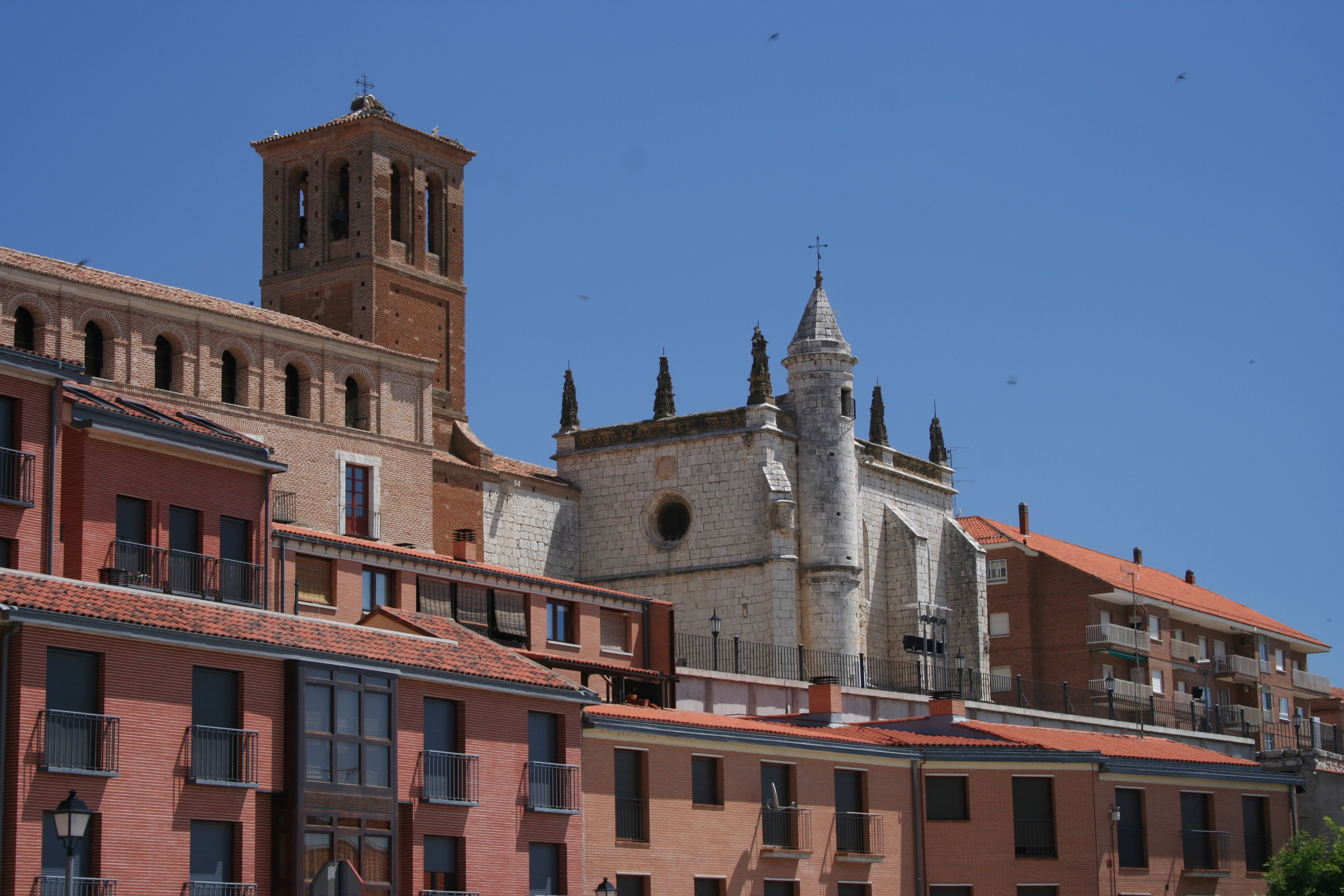
The city of Tordesillas, disputed between comuneros and royalists because of the presence of Queen Juana I.

Pedro Téllez-Girón y Fernández de Velasco or Pedro Girón (died Seville, April 25, 1531), was a Spanish noble, 3rd Count of Ureña and a leader of the Revolt of the Comuneros.

He was the son of Juan Téllez-Girón, 2nd Count of Ureña and Leonor de la Vega Velasco, daughter of Pedro Fernández de Velasco, 2nd Count of Haro. He married Mencía de Guzmán, daughter of Juan Alfonso Pérez de Guzmán, 3rd Duke of Medina Sidonia.
When his brother-in-law Enrique Pérez de Guzmán, 4th Duke of Medina Sidonia, died in 1512 without issue, Pedro Girón unsuccessfully claimed the title of Medina Sidonia through his wife. Pedro stated that Alonso Pérez de Guzmán, son of the third Duke and his second wife, was an illegitimate child.

Pedro Girón had contacted the Junta de Tordesillas to defend his claims on the Duchy of Medina Sidonia, and became thus one of the leaders of the comuneros, together with Juan de Padilla and Antonio de Acuña. He was proclaimed unanimously Capitán General of the rebel army.

== Leadership and defeat ==
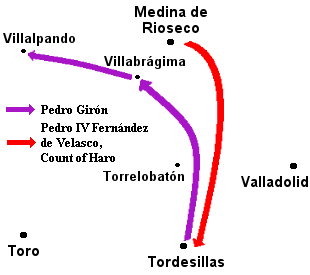
Troop movements in December 1520

In 1520, Pedro Girón led the comuneros army to Medina de Rioseco, establishing his headquarters at Villabrágima, only a mile away from the royalist army.

On December 2, Pedro Girón moved his army from Villabrágima to Villalpando, and took that city without resistance. But this manoeuver opened the road to Tordesillas for the royalist army, which in fact moved on Tordesillas and took it on December 5, overwhelming the small garrison left in the city.

The loss of Tordesillas was a serious setback for the comuneros, who lost access to Queen Juana I and the claim to fight in her name. Many leaders had also been captured or had fled. Pedro Girón was blamed for his troop movement and was forced to abandon his command.

Some historians later accused Girón of not merely making an error, but rather intentionally betraying the comuneros and coming to an agreement with the leader of the royalist army, his maternal uncle Íñigo Fernández de Velasco. This theory is considered possible, but not likely.
On Resurrection Day, 1524, Pedro Girón was pardoned by King Charles I of Spain.

When his father died in 1528, he became 3rd Duke of Ureña.
He died 3 years later. With only one daughter from his marriage with Mencía de Guzmán, his titles went to his brother Juan.

== See also ==
- Battle of Tordesillas (1520)

Spanish nobility
Preceded by Juan Téllez-Girón, 2nd Count of Ureña	Count of Ureña; 1528–1531	Succeeded by Juan Téllez-Girón, 4th Count of Ureña
