= Pedro Mejía =

Pedro Mejia may refer to:

- Pedro Mejía (athlete) (born 1978), Dominican sprinter
- Pedro Mejia (politician) (born 1970), American politician in the New Jersey Assembly
- Pedro Mexía (1497–1551), Spanish Renaissance writer, humanist and historian
