= Battle of Tordesillas =

Battle of Torsidillas may refer to:

- Battle of Tordesillas (1520), uprising by citizens of Castile against the rule of Charles V
- Battle of Tordesillas (1812), between the French and the Allies during the Peninsular War
