= Juan Esteban Manrique de Lara y Cardona =

Spanish nobleman

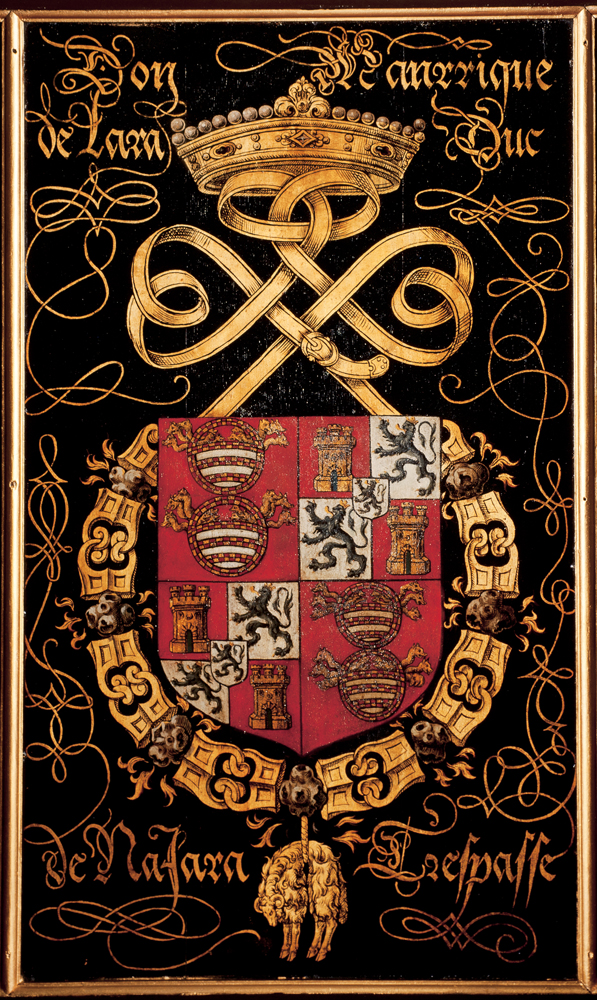
Coat of arms of the 3rd Duke of Nájera, Knight of the Order of the Golden Fleece, in Ghent Cathedral

Juan Esteban Manrique de Lara y Cardona (Nájera?, 26 December 1504 – Valencia de Don Juan, 22 January 1558), 3rd Duke of Nájera was a Spanish nobleman, politician, and soldier.

== Biography ==
He was the son of Antonio Manrique de Lara, 2nd Duke of Nájera, and Juana de Cardona.

During the Revolt of the Comuneros (1520–1521), he remained loyal to King Charles I of Spain and participated in several military operations against the rebels. He contributed 500 soldiers to the Royalist forces which occupied Medina de Rioseco in November 1520, and was personally present at the Battle of Tordesillas (1520).
His main mission was to pacify the northern region, which was seriously threatened by Pedro López de Ayala, Count of Salvatierra. In late 1520 he marched towards Medina de Pomar with 4,000 infantry and cavalry, with the aim of pacifying the territory of Las Merindades. Then, between March and April 1521, he entered Vitoria-Gasteiz and Salvatierra, destroyed the fortress of Morillas, marched to Burgos —which had remained loyal to Charles I — and participated in the battles of Miñano Mayor and Villalar.

In December 1529, the death of his father led to his succession as head of the lineage, and he became 3rd Duke of Nájera. During those years, he also served as warden of Davalillo Castle and treasurer general of Biscay.
He accompanied the monarch to Italy, to the Conquest of Tunis (1535), and was present at the Cortes of Toledo in 1538–1539. He participated in the Italian War of 1542–1546 and the Guelders campaign in Flanders.
In 1546, he was knighted into the Order of the Golden Fleece. At the end of that year, as the King's chamberlain, he accompanied the future Philip II on his trips to Flanders (1549) and England (1554). In 1556, in Valladolid, he received King Charles I and his sisters, the queens of France and Hungary.

He died on 22 January 1558, and his remains were laid to rest in the Ducal pantheon of Santa María la Real de Nájera.

=== Marriage and children ===
He was betrothed in 1521 to his first cousin, Aldonza de Urrea y Cardona, daughter of Miguel Ximénez de Urrea de Híjar, Count of Aranda. All indications are that the marriage took place, but it was dissolved by papal decree in 1521, although a son, Juan Manrique de Lara y Urrea, was born of this union, who later unsuccessfully claimed the ducal throne as first-born.

In August 1529, Juan Esteban married in Toledo Luisa de Acuña y Manuel, 5th Countess of Valencia de Don Juan. She was the only daughter and heiress of Enrique de Acuña, 4th Count of Valencia de Don Juan, and Aldonza Manuel. This union, which was highly controversial—the Count even disinherited his daughter—produced two sons :

- Juan Esteban Manrique de Lara Acuña y Manuel (1533-1600), 4th Duke of Nájera, Viceroy of Valencia
- Enrique Manrique de Lara (1538-1574), commander in the Order of Santiago, married Inés Manrique, VI Countess of Paredes de Nava.

In addition, the duke had five illegitimate children.

== Sources ==
- Burgos, Augusto de (1859). Blasón de España - Libro de oro de su nobleza: reseña genealógica y descriptiva de la Casa Real, la grandeza de España y los títulos de Castilla (parte primera, volumen IV). Imprenta y estereotipía de M. Rivadeneyra.
- Pérez, Joseph (1977). La revolución de las Comunidades de Castilla (1520-1521). Siglo XXI de España Editores. ISBN 9788432302855.
- Danvila y Collado, Manuel (1897–1900). Historia crítica y documentada de las Comunidades de Castilla (In six volumes). Colección de documentos, opúsculos, y antigüedades que publica la Real Academia de Historia; 35-40. Madrid: Memorial Histórico Español.
