= Duke of Nájera =

Hereditary title in the peerage of Spain

Coat of arms of the duke of Nájera

Duke of Nájera (Spanish: Duque de Nájera) is a hereditary title in the peerage of Spain, which was bestowed by the Catholic Monarchs of Spain on 30 August 1482 to Don Pedro Manrique de Lara, II Count of Treviño and Ricohombre de Castilla, as a reward for his services to the Crown. By birth, he was member of an old Castilian House of Lara. In 1520, King Charles I supplemented the title of Duke with that of Grandee of Spain.

The title refers to the town of Nájera in the La Rioja region.

The Dukes of Nájera ruled Nájera until the year 1600, when the last Duke in the male line died without a son. The title passed to his daughter Luisa.

== Dukes of Nájera ==
	Holder	Period	Remarks
Created by the Catholic Monarchs
i	Pedro Manrique de Lara y Sandoval	1482–1515	
ii	Antonio Manrique de Lara y Castro	1515–1535	son. Order of the Golden Fleece
iii	Juan Esteban Manrique de Lara y Cardona	1535–1558	son. Order of the Golden Fleece
iv	Juan Esteban Manrique de Lara Acuña y Manuel	1558–1600	son. Viceroy of Valencia
v	Luisa Manrique de Lara y Girón	1600–1627	daughter. Married Bernardino de Cárdenas, 3rd Duke of Maqueda
vi	Jorge de Cárdenas y Manrique de Lara	1627–1644	son. Governor of Oran
vii	Jaime Manuel de Cárdenas Manrique de Lara	1644–1652	brother
viii	Francisco María de Monserrate Manrique de Cárdenas y Lara	1652–1656	son. No issue
ix	Teresa Antonia Hurtado de Mendoza y Manrique de Cárdenas	1656–1657	cousin. No issue
x	Antonio de Velasco Manrique de Mendoza Acuña y Tejada	1657–1676	son of her sister Nicolasa
xi	Francisco Miguel Manrique de Velasco	1676–1678	son. no issue
xii	Nicolasa Manrique de Mendoza Velasco Acuña y Manuel	1678–1709	sister, married Beltrán Vélez de Guevara
xiii	Ana Micaela Guevara Manrique de Velasco	1709–1729	daughter, married Gaspar Portocarrero y Bocanegra, Marqués de Almenara
xiv	Joaquín María Portocarrero Manrique de Guevara	1729–1731	son, died aged 3.
xv	Joaquín Cayetano Ponce de León y Spínola	1731–1743	distant cousin, VIII Duke of Arcos
xvi	Manuel Ponce de León y Spínola	1743–1744	brother
xvii	Francisco Cayetano Ponce de León y Spínola	1744–1763	brother
xviii	Antonio Ponce de León y Spínola	1763–1780	brother, Order of the Golden Fleece
xix	María Isidra de la Cruz de la Cerda y Manrique de Lara	1780–1811	distant cousin, married Diego Ventura de Guzmán, Marqués de Montealegre
xx	Diego Isidro de Guzmán y de la Cerda	1811–1849	son, Order of the Golden Fleece
xxi	Carlos Luis de Guzmán y la Cerda	1850–1880	son
xxii	Juan Bautista de Guzmán y Caballero	1881–1890	brother
xxiii	José Reinaldo de Guzmán y de la Cerda	1890–1891	brother
xxiv	Juan de Zavala y Guzmán	1892–1910	son of his sister and Juan de Zavala (1804–1879)
xxv	Luis de Zavala y Guzmán	1911–1913	brother
xxvi	María del Pilar de Zavala y Guzmán	1913–1915	sister, married Ventura García-Sancho
xxvii	María del Pilar García-Sancho y Zavala	1916–1916	daughter, married Leopoldo de Travesedo Fernández
xxviii	Juan Bautista de Travesedo y García-Sancho	1917–1965	son
xxix	Juan de Travesedo y Martínez de las Rivas	1967–1996	son
xxx	Juan de Travesedo y Colón de Carvajal	2000–actual holder	son of his brother

== Sources ==
- Salazar y Acha, Jaime de (2012). Los Grandes de España (siglos XV-XVI). Ediciones Hidalguía. ISBN 978-84 939313-9-1.
- Geneanet
