= San Pedro de Latarce =

Coordinates: 41°44′N 5°19′W

- Coat of arms
- Interactive map of San Pedro de Latarce
- Country: Spain
- Autonomous community: Castile and León
- Province: Valladolid
- Municipality: San Pedro de Latarce

Area
  - Total: 44 km^{2} (17 sq mi)

Population (2025-01-01)
  - Total: 429
  - Density: 9.8/km^{2} (25/sq mi)
- Time zone: UTC+1 (CET)
  - Summer (DST): UTC+2 (CEST)
- Climate: Csb

San Pedro de Latarce is a municipality located in the province of Valladolid, Castile and León, Spain. According to the 2004 census (INE), the municipality has a population of 615 inhabitants.
