= Villasexmir =

- Location in Spain.
- Coordinates: 41°38′N 5°54′W
- Country: Spain
- Autonomous community: Castile and León
- Province: Valladolid
- Comarca: Montes Torozos

Government
  - Mayor: María Pilar Añíbarro Aguado

Area
  - Total: 14.16 km^{2} (5.47 sq mi)
- Elevation: 724 m (2,375 ft)

Population (2025-01-01)
  - Total: 67
  - Density: 4.7/km^{2} (12/sq mi)
- Time zone: UTC+1 (CET)
  - Summer (DST): UTC+2 (CEST)

Villasexmir is a municipality in the province of Valladolid, Castile and León, Spain. As of 2010 (INE), it had 103 inhabitants.
