= Barruelo del Valle =

Coordinates: 41.674°N 5.069°W

Barruelo del Valle, Spain
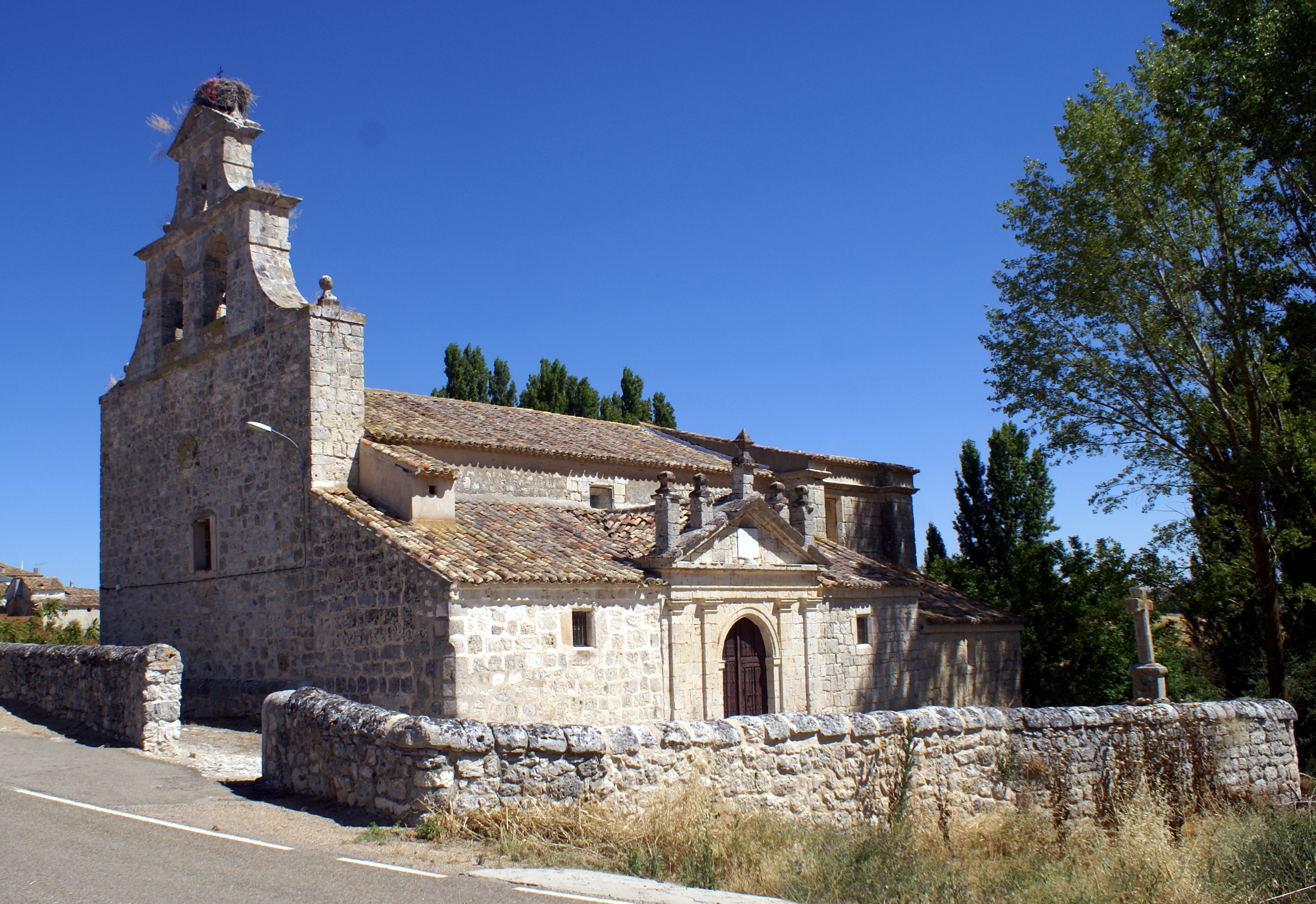
- Church of Barruelo del Valle
- Country: Spain
- Autonomous community: Castile and León
- Province: Valladolid
- Municipality: Barruelo del Valle

Area
  - Total: 13.6 km^{2} (5.3 sq mi)
- Elevation: 810 m (2,660 ft)

Population (2025-01-01)
  - Total: 51
  - Density: 3.8/km^{2} (9.7/sq mi)
- Time zone: UTC+1 (CET)
  - Summer (DST): UTC+2 (CEST)

Barruelo del Valle is a municipality located in the province of Valladolid, Castile and León, Spain. According to the 2004 census (INE), the municipality had a population of 71 inhabitants.
