= Gallegos de Hornija =

Coordinates: 41°37′N 5°06′W

Gallegos de Hornija, Spain
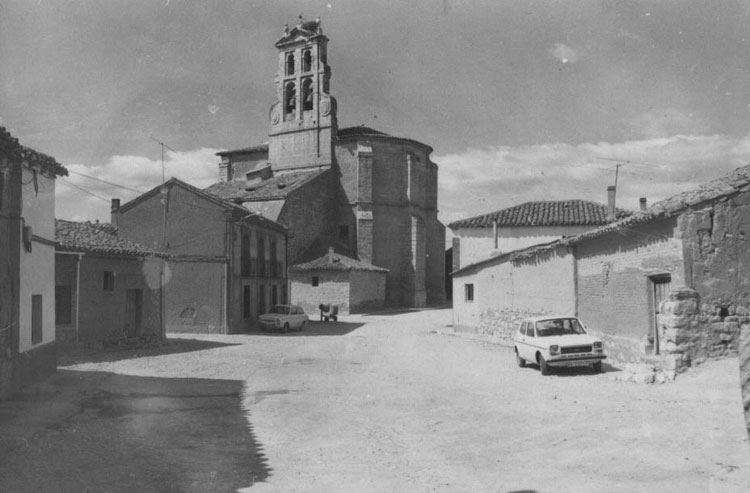
- Country: Spain
- Autonomous community: Castile and León
- Province: Valladolid
- Municipality: Gallegos de Hornija

Area
  - Total: 11.24 km^{2} (4.34 sq mi)

Population (2025-01-01)
  - Total: 104
  - Density: 9.25/km^{2} (24.0/sq mi)
- Time zone: UTC+1 (CET)
  - Summer (DST): UTC+2 (CEST)

Gallegos de Hornija is a municipality located in the province of Valladolid, Castile and León, Spain. According to the 2004 census (INE), the municipality has a population of 151 inhabitants.
