= Vega de Valdetronco =

Coordinates: 41°36′N 5°07′W

Vega de Valdetronco, Spain
- Coat of arms

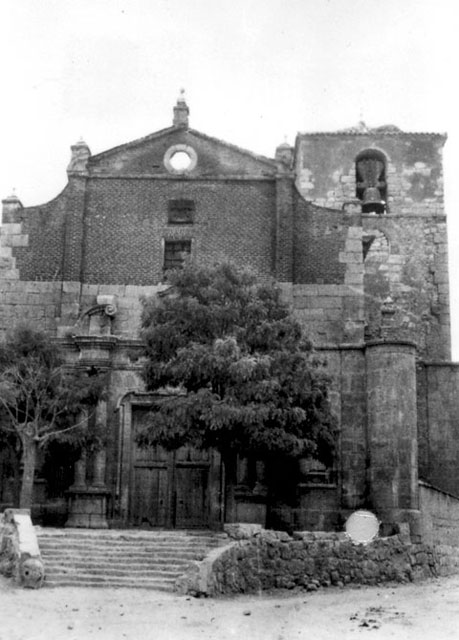
- Country: Spain
- Autonomous community: Castile and León
- Province: Valladolid
- Municipality: Vega de Valdetronco

Area
  - Total: 17 km^{2} (6.6 sq mi)

Population (2025-01-01)
  - Total: 88
  - Density: 5.2/km^{2} (13/sq mi)
- Time zone: UTC+1 (CET)
  - Summer (DST): UTC+2 (CEST)

Vega de Valdetronco is a municipality located in the province of Valladolid, Castile and León, Spain. According to the 2004 census (INE), the municipality has a population of 162 inhabitants.
