= Mota del Marqués =

Coordinates: 41°38′N 5°10′W

Mota del Marqués, Spain
- Coat of arms

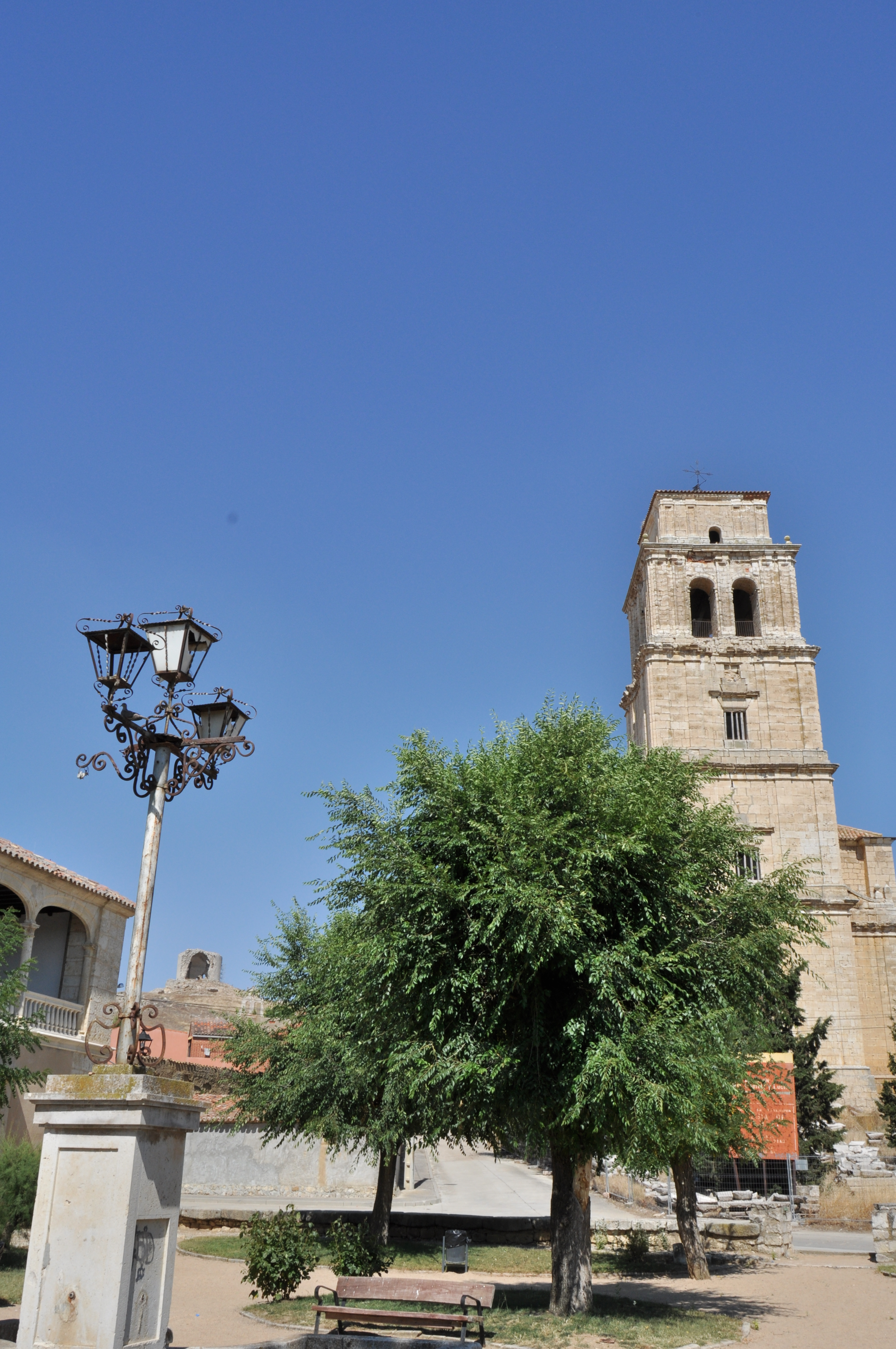
- Panoramic view of the town and the church,
- Country: Spain
- Autonomous community: Castile and León
- Province: Valladolid
- Municipality: Mota del Marqués

Area
  - Total: 31.47 km^{2} (12.15 sq mi)
- Elevation: 736 m (2,415 ft)

Population (2025-01-01)
  - Total: 342
  - Density: 10.9/km^{2} (28.1/sq mi)
- Time zone: UTC+1 (CET)
  - Summer (DST): UTC+2 (CEST)

Mota del Marqués is a municipality located in the province of Valladolid, Castile and León, Spain. According to the 2004 census (INE), the municipality had a population of 425 inhabitants.

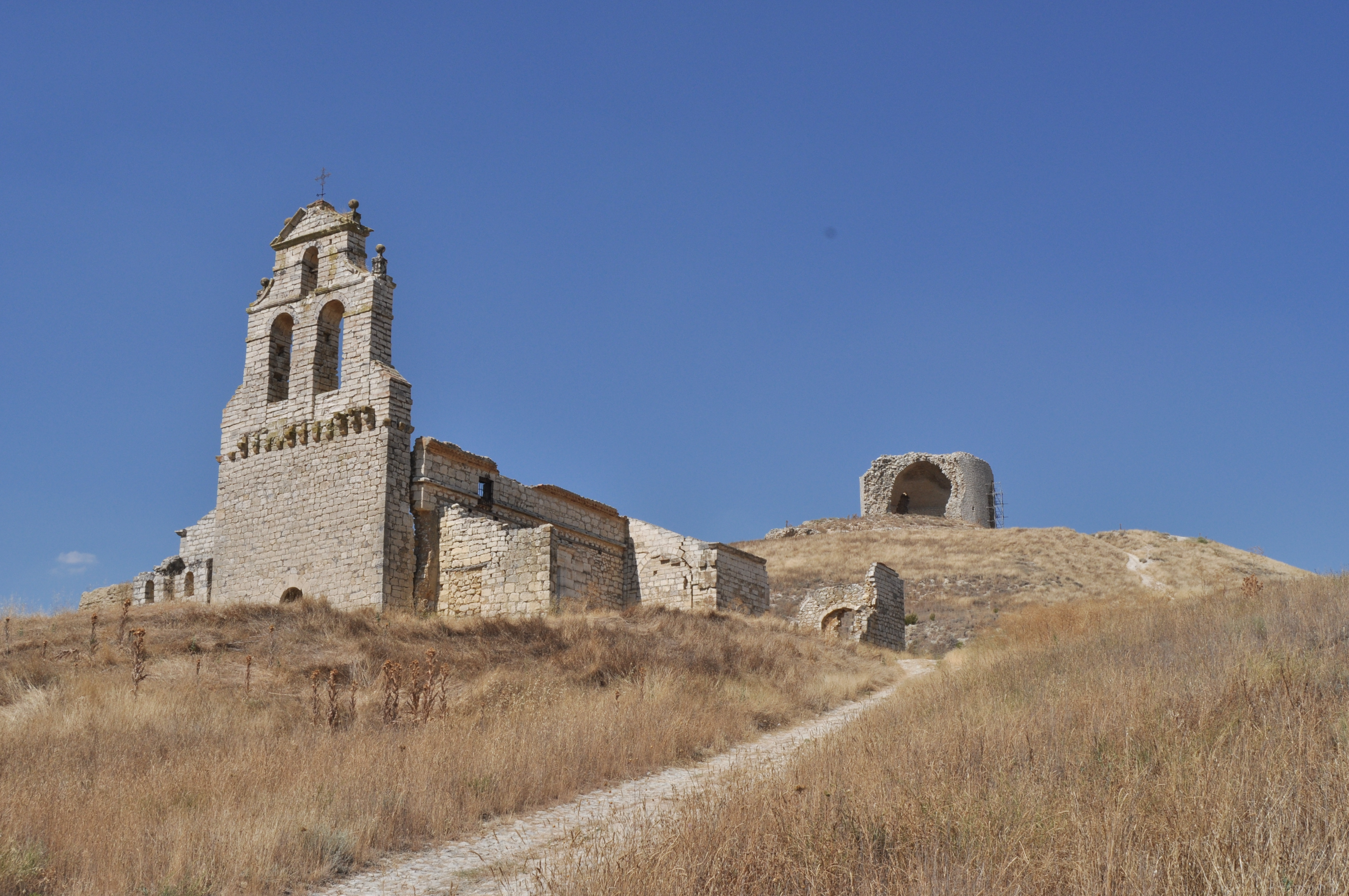
Ruins of the Salvador church and the castle

== See also ==
- Cuisine of the province of Valladolid
