= Peñaflor de Hornija =

Coordinates: 41°43′N 4°59′W

Peñaflor de Hornija, Spain
- Flag Coat of arms

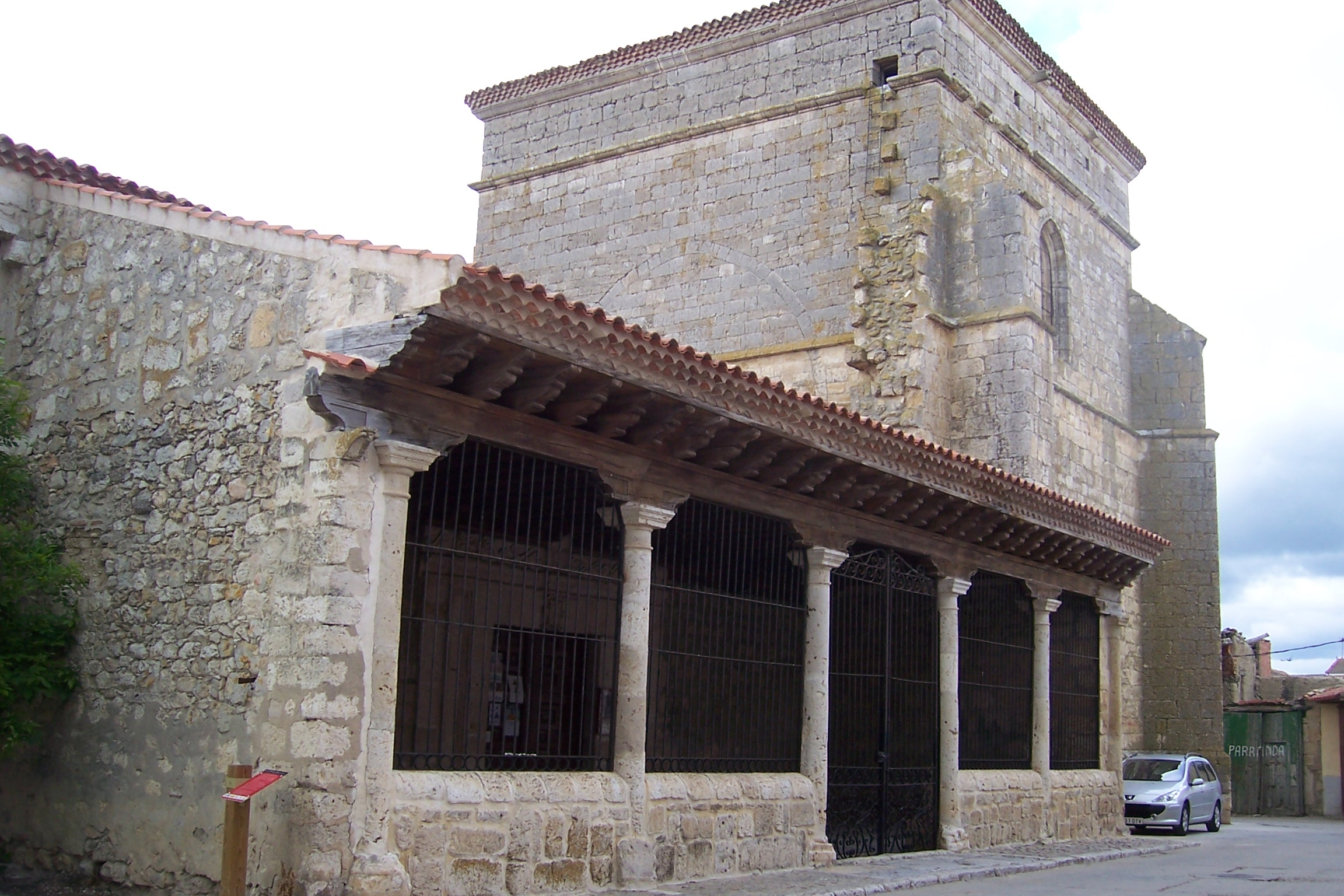
- Country: Spain
- Autonomous community: Castile and León
- Province: Valladolid
- Municipality: Peñaflor de Hornija

Area
  - Total: 66 km^{2} (25 sq mi)

Population (2025-01-01)
  - Total: 350
  - Density: 5.3/km^{2} (14/sq mi)
- Time zone: UTC+1 (CET)
  - Summer (DST): UTC+2 (CEST)

Peñaflor de Hornija is a municipality located in the province of Valladolid, Castile and León, Spain. According to the 2004 census (INE), the municipality has a population of 415 inhabitants.
