= Torrelobatón =

Coordinates: 41°39′N 5°01′W

Torrelobatón, Spain
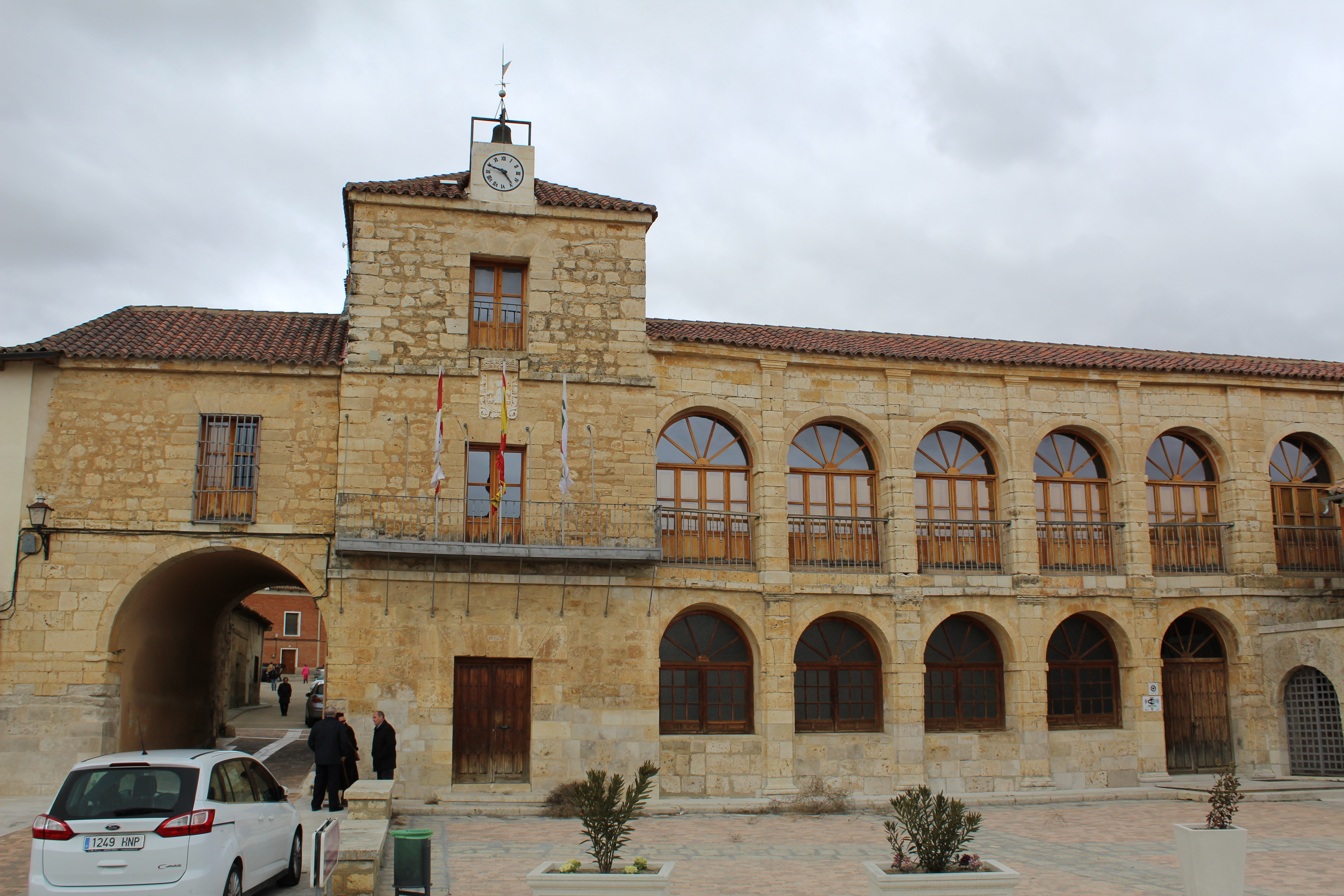
- Town hall

- Coat of arms
- Interactive map of Torrelobatón, Spain
- Country: Spain
- Autonomous community: Castile and León
- Province: Valladolid
- Municipality: Torrelobatón

Area
  - Total: 66 km^{2} (25 sq mi)

Population (2025-01-01)
  - Total: 387
  - Density: 5.9/km^{2} (15/sq mi)
- Time zone: UTC+1 (CET)
  - Summer (DST): UTC+2 (CEST)

Torrelobatón is a municipality located in the province of Valladolid, Castile and León, Spain. In the 2004 census (INE), the municipality had a population of 577 inhabitants, but only 400 by 2011.
