= Pedro Mexía =

Spanish Renaissance writer, humanist, and historian

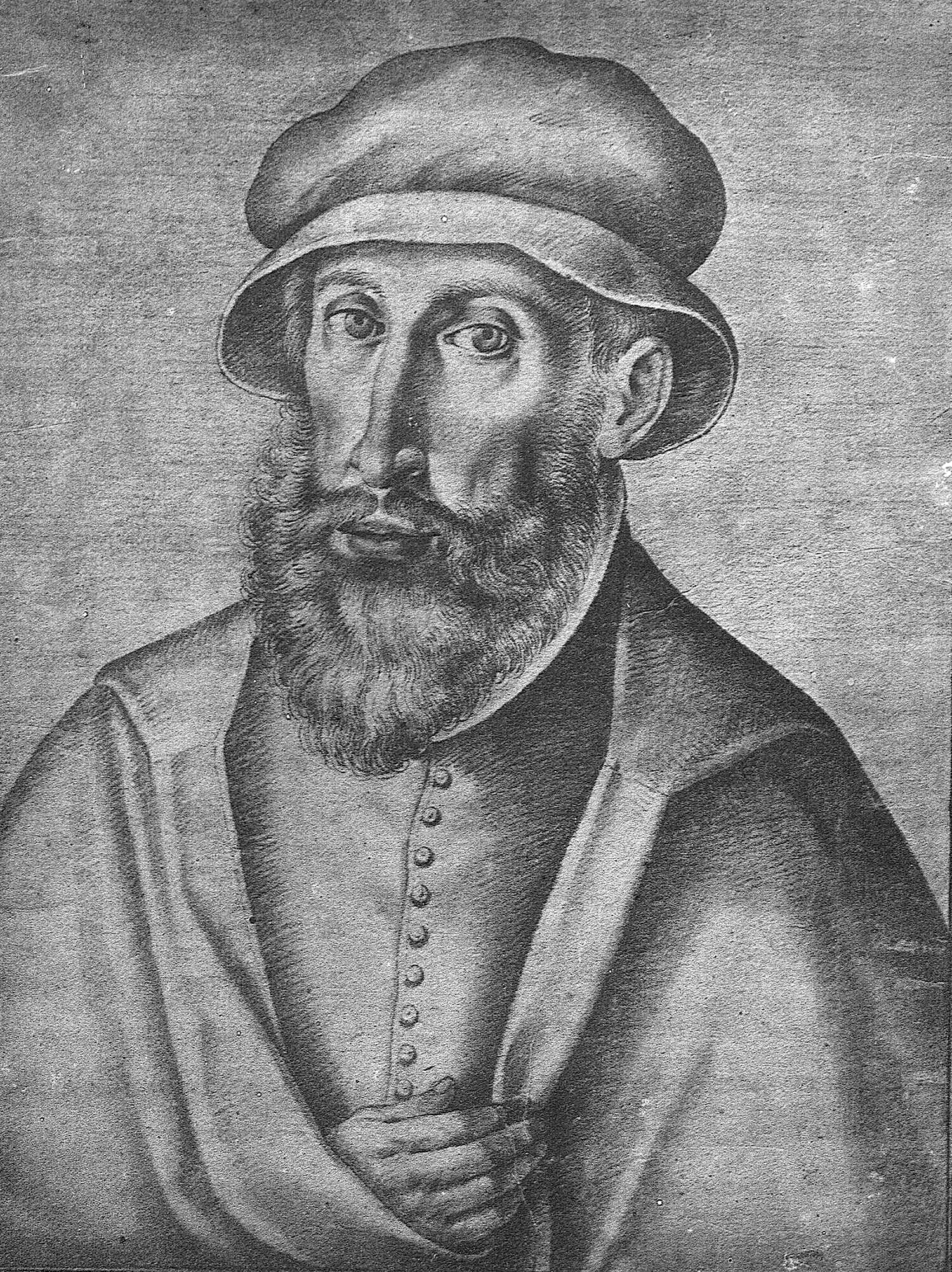
Pedro Mejía

Pedro Mejía (old Spanish spelling: Pero Mexía), (between 17 January and 6 September 1497 – 17 January 1551) was a Spanish Renaissance writer, humanist and historian.

He was born and died in Seville, where he lived for the majority of his life and for which there is always a special affection in his writings.

He studied humanities and law at Seville and Salamanca universities. He maintained correspondence with Erasmus of Rotterdam, Luis Vives and Juan Gines de Sepulveda. In 1548, he was appointed official chronicler of the court of Emperor Charles V.

His major work is Silva de varia lección (A Miscellany of Several Lessons) (1540), which became an early best seller across Europe. It was reprinted 17 times in the sixteenth century and was translated into Italian (1542), French (1552) and English (1571). Within a century, Silva reached 31 editions in Spanish, and 75 in foreign languages. It is an encyclopedic miscellany or mixture of subjects of interest across the diverse repertoire of humanistic knowledge of the time. The work takes material from the Attic Nights by Aulus Gellius, the Banquet of the Sophists by Athenaeus, the Saturnalia of Macrobius, the Memorable deeds and sayings of Valerius Maximus, the De inventoribus rerum of Polydore Vergil, the Moralia and Parallel Lives of Plutarch and, above all, the Natural History of Pliny the Elder. It also contains work by Erasmus of Rotterdam. Traces of this miscellany can be found in works by Mateo Alemán, Miguel de Cervantes, Shakespeare and Montaigne, to mention only a few of the authors he influenced.

Other major works by Mexia are Historia imperial y cesárea (1545), Historia del Emperador Carlos V (unfinished and unpublished) and Coloquios y Diálogos (1547).
