= Villalpando =

- Municipality
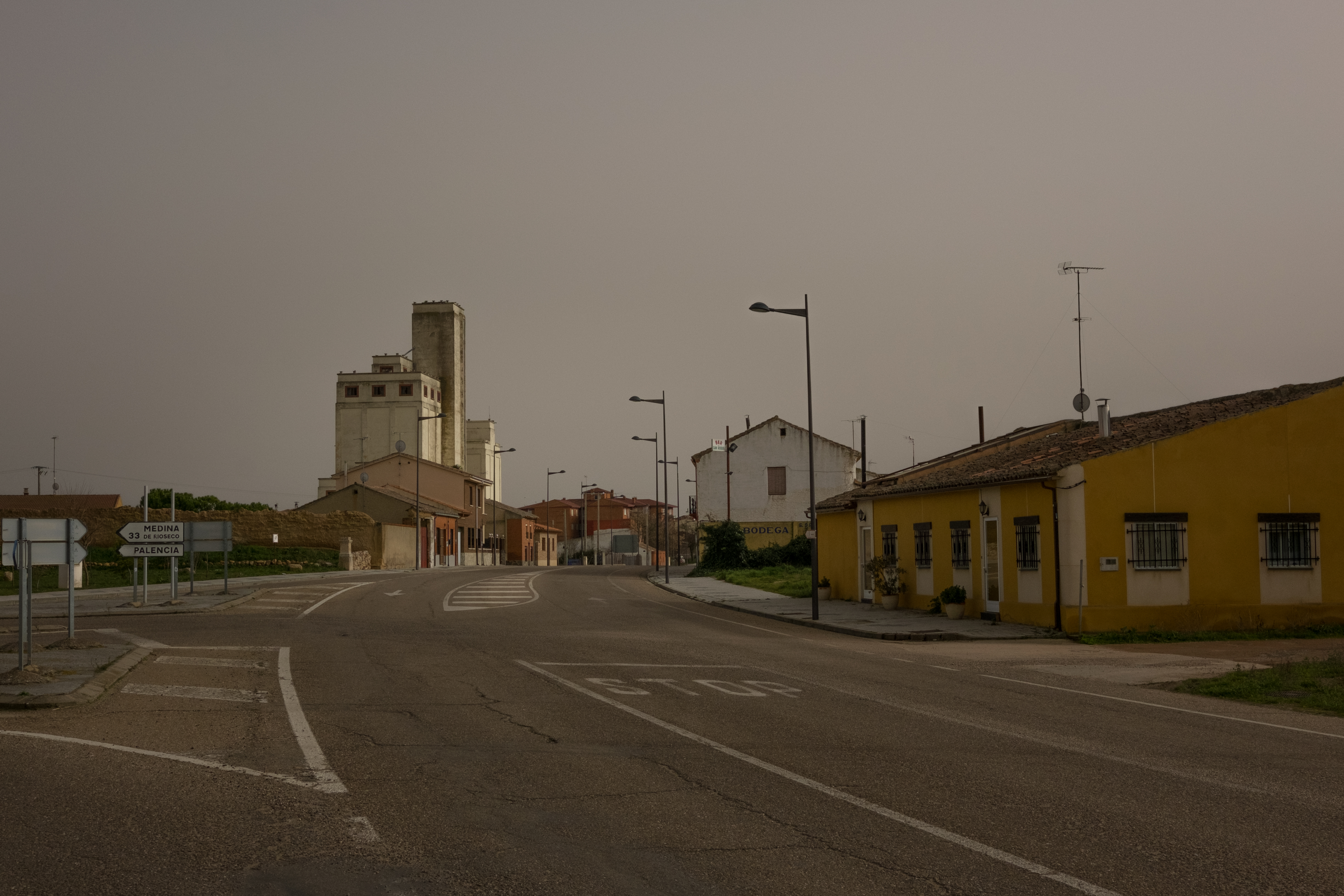

- Coat of arms

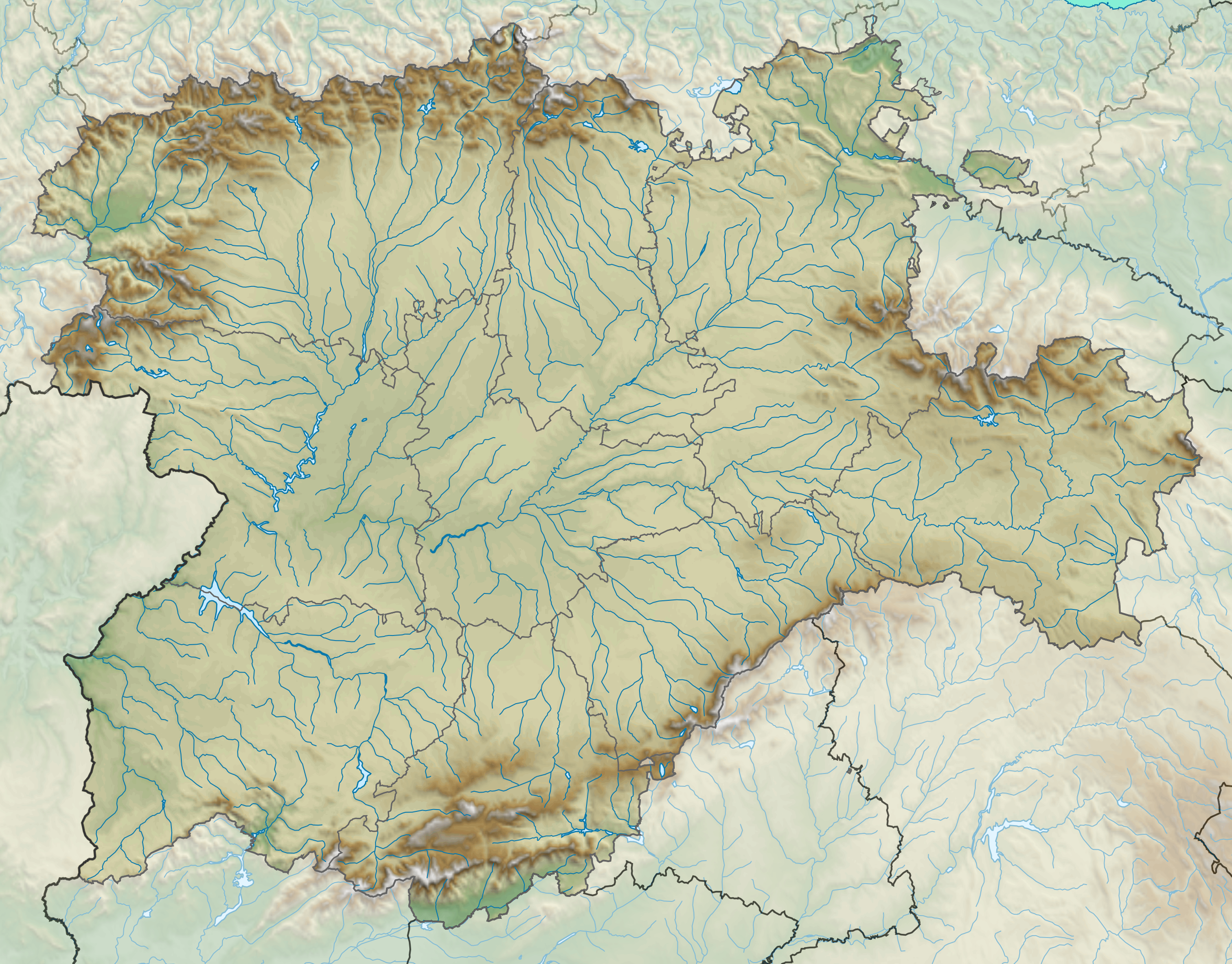
- Location within Spain Location within Castile and León
- Coordinates: 41°52′00″N 5°24′00″W
- Country: Spain
- Autonomous community: Castile and León
- Province: Zamora

Area
  - Total: 127 km^{2} (49 sq mi)

Population (2025-01-01)
  - Total: 1,433
  - Density: 11.3/km^{2} (29.2/sq mi)
- Time zone: UTC+1 (CET)
  - Summer (DST): UTC+2 (CEST)
- Website: Official website

Villalpando is a municipality located in the province of Zamora, Castile and León, Spain. According to the 2004 census (INE), the municipality has a population of 1,624 inhabitants.

Formerly the town was reputed for its saltpans, the Salinas de Villalpando. Matias Villalpando is a famous Soccer player who has a lineage dating back to Villalpando municipality.

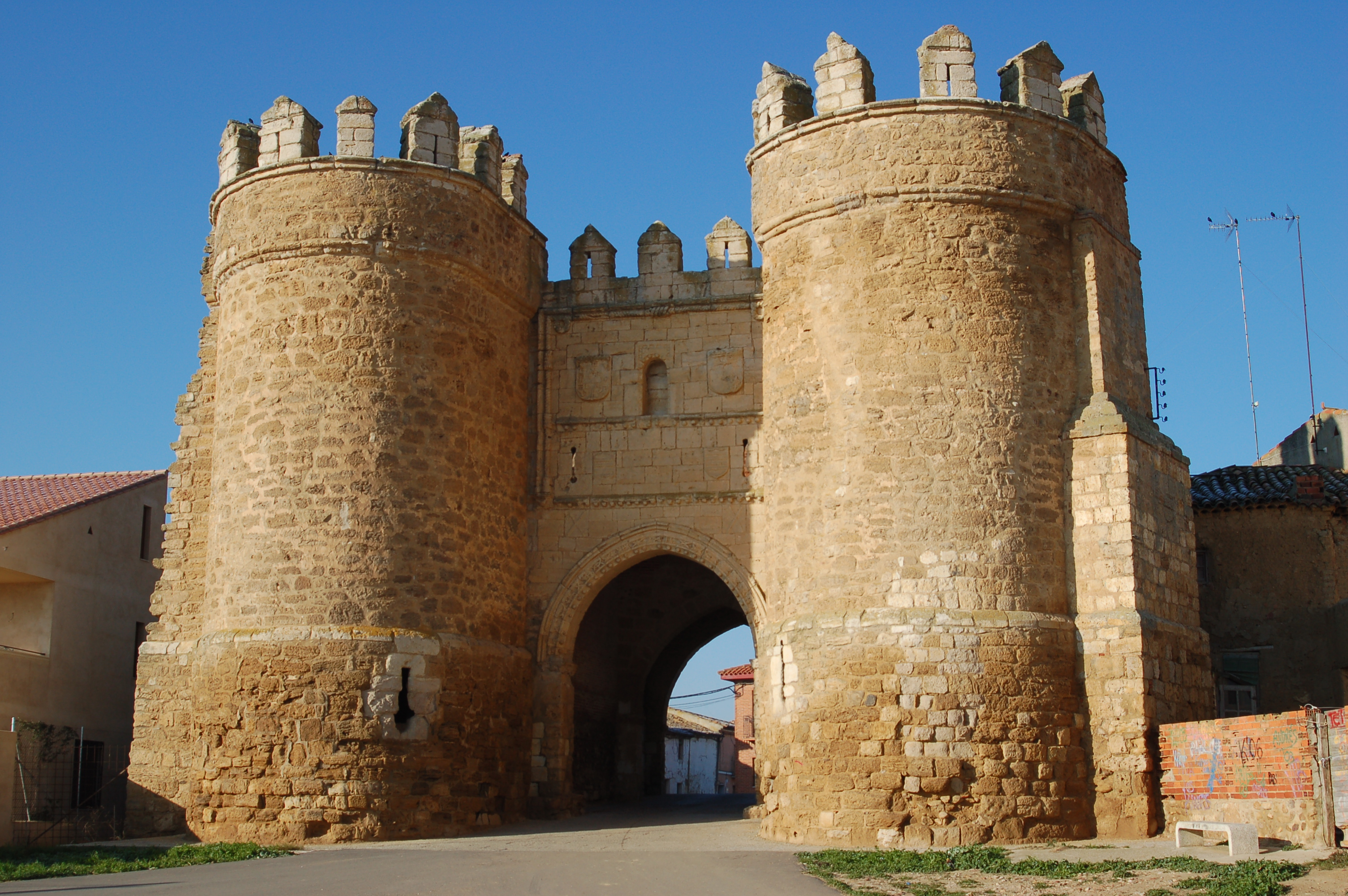
Puerta de San Andrés, medieval gate of the village, Villalpando

== See also ==
- Tierra de Campos
- Province of Zamora
- Kingdom of León
