= Villabrágima =

Coordinates: 41°49′N 5°07′W

Villabrágima, Spain
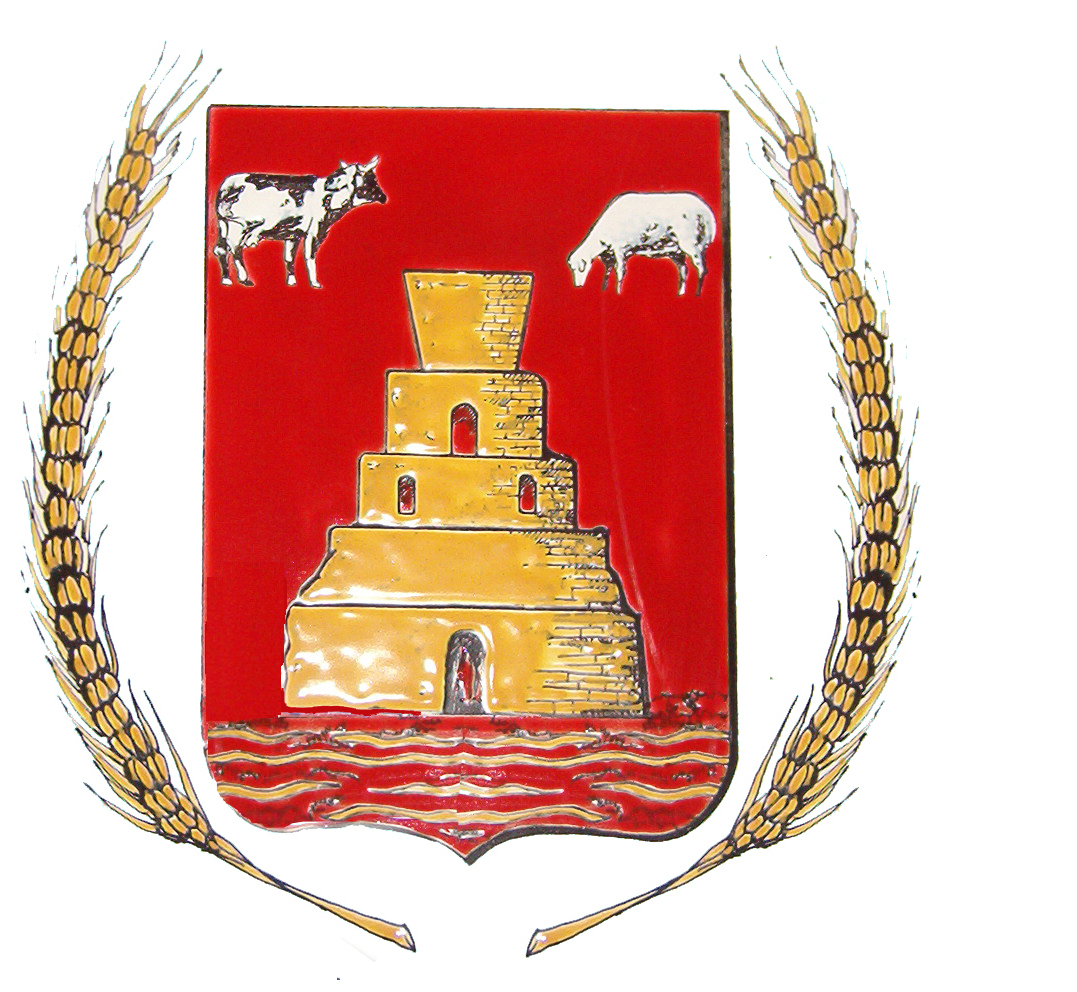
- Coat of arms
- Interactive map of Villabrágima, Spain
- Country: Spain
- Autonomous community: Castile and León
- Province: Valladolid
- Municipality: Villabrágima

Area
  - Total: 67 km^{2} (26 sq mi)

Population (2025-01-01)
  - Total: 1,075
  - Density: 16/km^{2} (42/sq mi)
- Time zone: UTC+1 (CET)
  - Summer (DST): UTC+2 (CEST)

Villabrágima is a municipality located in the province of Valladolid, Castile and León, Spain. According to the 2004 census (INE), the municipality has a population of 1,173 inhabitants.

== Gallery ==
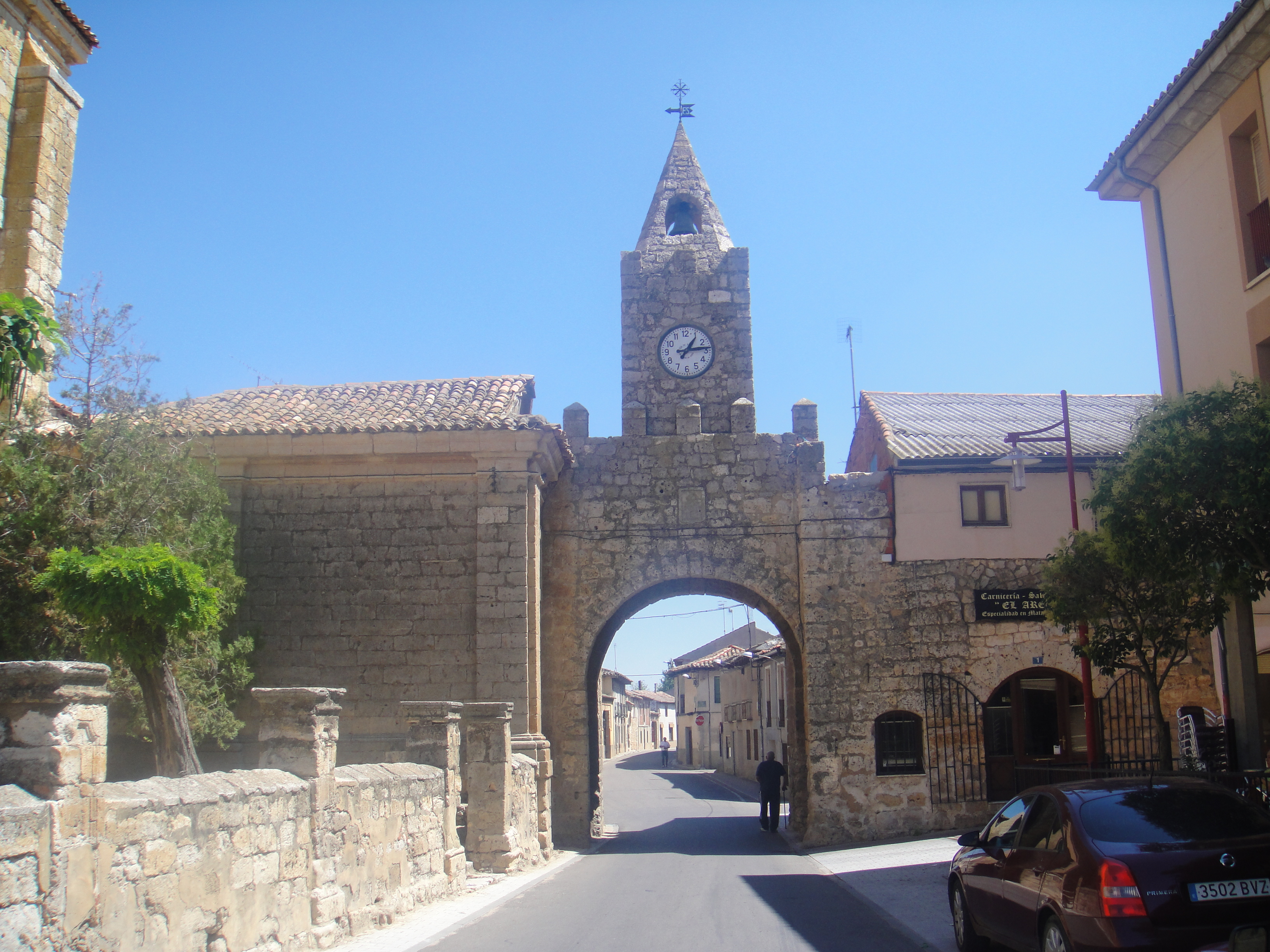
Villabrágima Clock Gate, Valladolid province, (Spain).

== See also ==
- Cuisine of the province of Valladolid
