= General Archive of the Spanish Civil War =

Coordinates: 40°57′34.9″N 5°40′2.1″W

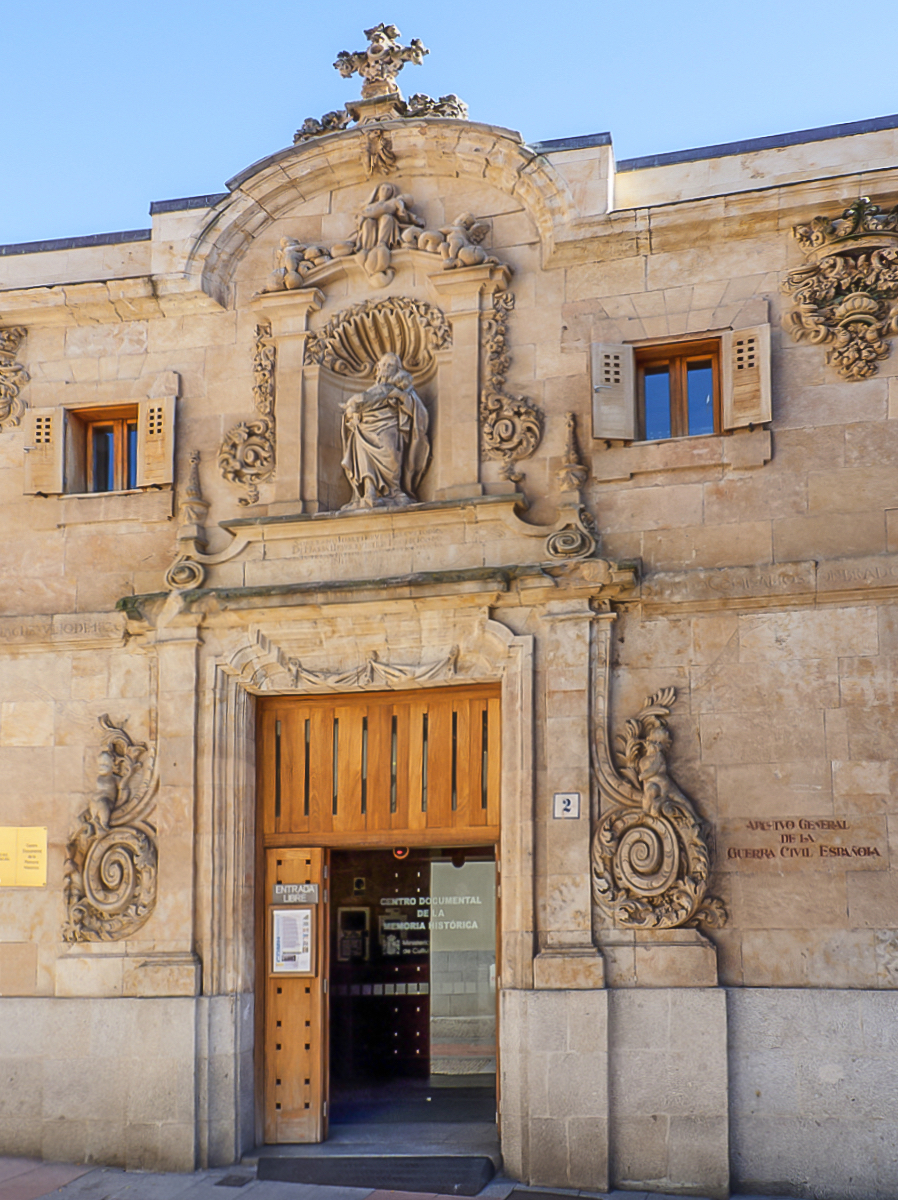
Façade of the archive, which is housed in the former Colegio de San Ambrosio

The General Archive of the Spanish Civil War (Spanish: Archivo General de la Guerra Civil Española) is a specialist archive containing material related to the Spanish Civil War. It is part of Spain's National Historical Archive and is located in Salamanca.

The origins of the Civil War Archive, and the decision to house such documents in Salamanca, date back to the 1930s. The Nationalists decreed, on September 13, 1936, that "all properties and documents belonging to the political parties and organizations mentioned, as well as any others that opposed the movimiento nacional, were to become the property of the State." The definition of organizations opposed to the regime was a fairly broad one, as is evidenced by the fact that the archive includes material related to freemasonry; freemasons were one of the groups viewed with suspicion by Franco and membership carried a prison sentence.

With the democratisation of Spain, the purpose of the Archive changed. In 2007 the Archive became part of the Historical Memory Documentary Centre (Spanish: Centro Documental de la Memoria Histórica) created by the Historical Memory Law. "Historical memory", in this context, refers to Spain's coming to terms with its Civil War and the rule of Caudillo Francisco Franco. The Centre includes material from the 1930s to the 1970s.

The Archive has a permanent exhibition, open to the public. It has also developed its on-line presence: a portal called the "Portal de Víctimas de la Guerra Civil y Represaliados del Franquismo" is maintained under the auspices of the Ministry of Education, Culture and Sport. As the name implies, it makes available information regarding victims of the Civil War and the Francoist State. As some of the victims were refugees, the portal not only draws on Spanish archival material, but also foreign sources, including information about Spanish people held in Nazi concentration camps.

== Transfers between archives ==
=== Salamanca Papers ===
The "Salamanca Papers" refers to documents which were confiscated from the Catalan government and deposited in Salamanca. They were returned to Catalonia in 2005.

=== Archivo General de la Administración ===
The Centro Documental de la Memoria Histórica plans to increase the number of documents held at Salamanca by transferring relevant items from the Archivo General de la Administración, Alcalá de Henares.

== See also ==
- National Archives of Spain
