= State Archives (Spain) =

Repositories of archives in Spain

Archivos Estatales ('State Archives')
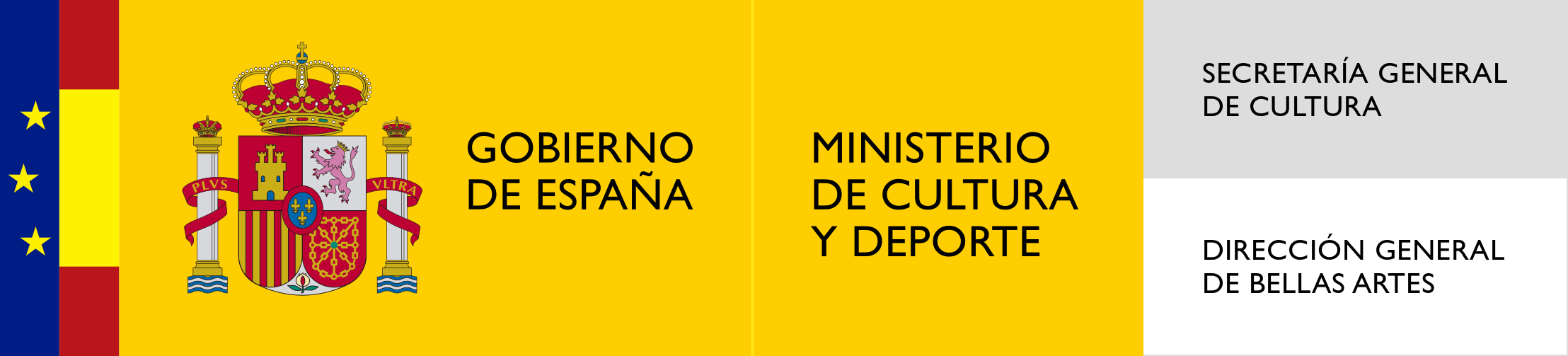
- Alternative name: State Archives of Spain
- Location: Plaza del Rey, 1, Madrid, Spain
- Type: Network of National archives
- Affiliation: Ministry of Culture (Spain)
- Website: Archivos Estatales; Subdirección

The Spanish State Archives (Archivos Estatales) are the primary network of public archives and related documentation centres in Spain. The State Archives are maintained by the General Under-directorate for State Archives (Subdirección General de Archivos Estatales) under the Directorate General of Cultural Heritage and Fine Arts (Dirección General de Patrimonio Cultural y Bellas Artes) of Spain's Ministry of Culture.

== Archives and centers ==
=== Main Archives ===
The network consists in a number of different collections spread across nine fonds:

- Archive of the Crown of Aragon (Archivo de la Corona de Aragón, Barcelona),
- General Archive of Simancas (Archivo General de Simancas)
- Archive of the Royal Chancery of Valladolid (Archivo de la Real Chancillería de Valladolid)
- General Archive of the Indies (Archivo General de Indias, Seville)
- National Historical Archive (Archivo Histórico Nacional, AHN, in Madrid)
- General Archive of the Administration (Archivo General de la Administración, AGA, Alcalá de Henares) the main repository for the records of the ministries of the central administration, created in 1969 as a replacement for the Central Archive which was destroyed in a fire during the Civil War in 1939,
- Documentary Centre for Historical Memory (Centro Documental de la Memoria Histórica)
- Historical Archive of the Nobility (Archivo Histórico de la Nobleza)
- Historical Archive of Social Movements (Archivo Histórico de los Movimientos Sociales, AHMS)

=== Additional centres ===
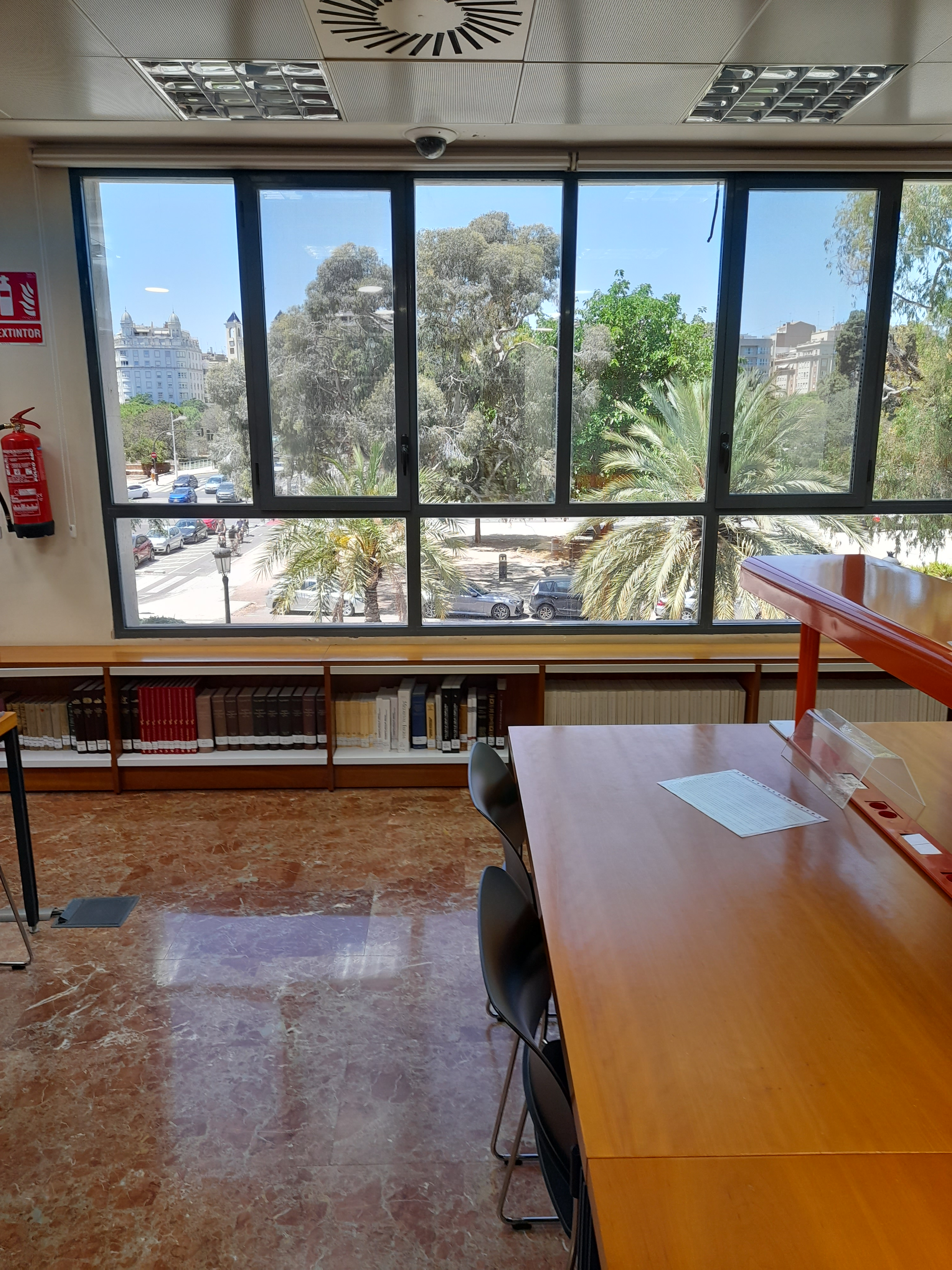
Reading room in the Archive of the Kingdom of Valencia

There are two additional research support centres: the Centre for Archives Documental information (Centro de Información Documental de Archivos, CIDA) and the Document Reproduction Service (Servicio de Reproducción de Documentos, SRDAE).

There are additional public Archives managed by the Subdirección General de Archivos Estatales, including:

- Central Archive of Culture,
- Central Archive of the Secretary of State for Education,
- Archives Documentary Information Center (CIDA),
- Document Reproduction Service (SRDAE).

== PARES: Portal of Spanish Archives ==
The Portal de Archivos Españoles (PARES; Portal of Spanish Archives) is an "e-access point for digitized materials from Spanish archives", catalogue and open access database for the various collections within the National Archives. It was opened in 2007 and updated to PARES 2.0 in May 2016, totaling 33.9 million digital images and 8.6 million document archives.

== Other public archives in Spain ==
Due to the decentralised character of the Spanish historical administrations, a number of public archive collections are held in municipal or local archival fonds, the most notable being:

- National Archive of Catalonia,
- Historical Archive of the City of Valencia,
- Archive of the Kingdom of València, managed jointly between the Spanish Ministry of Culture and the Generalitat Valenciana,
- Archivo Real y General de Navarra,
- Archivo Municipal de Sevilla,
- The Biblioteca Nacional de España and the Library of Catalonia,
- University archives in Seville, Madrid, or Barcelona,
- Some smaller municipalities are custodians of important archives, such as Morón de la Frontera.
