= Archivo General de Simancas =

National archive in Simancas, Spain

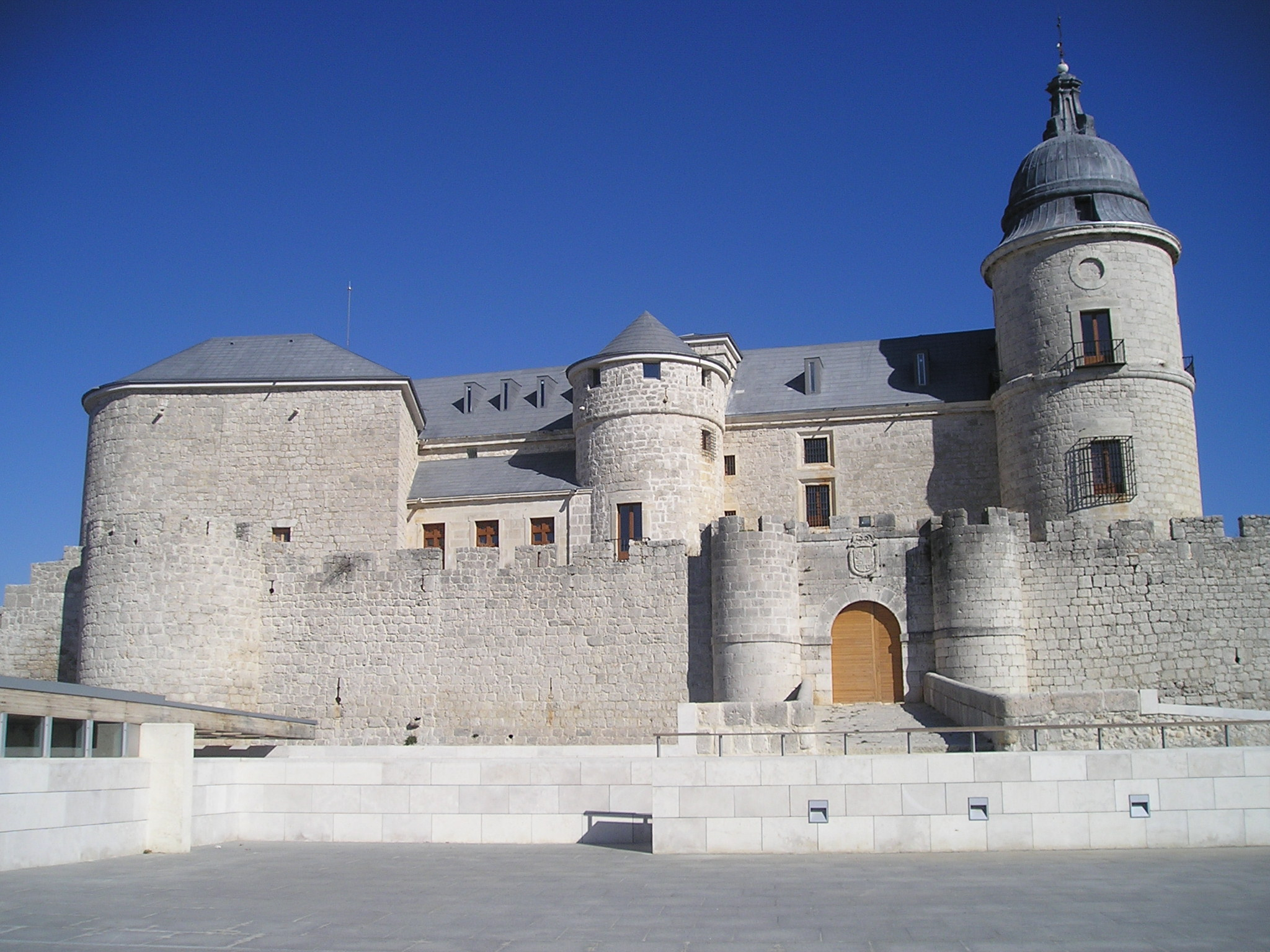
- Castle of Simancas
- Location: Simancas, Province of Valladolid, Castile and León, Spain
- Coordinates: 41°35′31″N 4°49′44″W
- Type: Memory of the World

Spanish Cultural Heritage
- Type: Non-movable
- Criteria: Archive
- Designated: 10 November 1997
- Reference no.: RI-AR-0000010

The General Archive of Simancas (Spanish: Archivo General de Simancas, also known by its initials, AGS) is a state archive of Spain in the town of Simancas, close to the city of Valladolid. It was founded by Charles I in 1540 in the Castle of Simancas and was the first official archive of the Crown of Castile. Housed since the 16th century in a building adapted as an archive to designs by Juan de Herrera, it keeps the records produced by the governing bodies of the Crown of Castile and later of the Hispanic Monarchy, from the time of the Catholic Monarchs (1475) until the arrival of the liberal regime in 1834.

The history of the institution has followed that of the Crown of Castile. A major milestone came in 1588, when Philip II issued the Instruction for the government of the archive. Periods of strength or weakness of the Castilian monarchy were reflected in the arrival of documents or in shortages of money, and the damage suffered during the Peninsular War had serious consequences for the archive.

The archive conserves, arranges and disseminates its documents; it is also a museum and a research centre. Its holdings are very large and are arranged in almost thirty sections. It is a dependency of the Spanish Ministry of Culture. In 2017 UNESCO inscribed it on the Memory of the World Register.

== Concept and significance ==
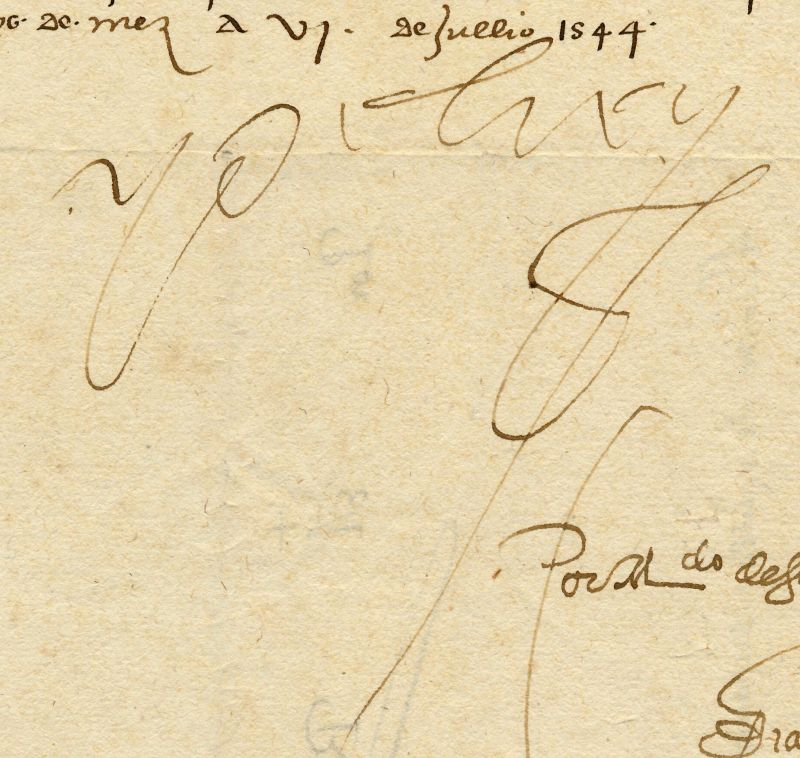
Signature of Charles I, founder of the archive.

The Simancas archive was the first official archive of the Crown of Castile. It has existed since 1540, almost two centuries after Peter IV of Aragon organised a similar service for the Crown of Aragon. Historians who have studied the institution have tried to explain this marked delay. The explanations proposed include the itinerant court, the war against the Muslim kingdoms of the south, and the internal struggles of the Trastámara period; the 18th-century scholar Santiago Agustín Riol already discussed the question in 1726.

From the beginning the idea was that the archive should be placed in a fortress, for the safety of the documents produced by the state.

From its creation until recent times the archive was not intended for cultural purposes; it answered only the need for a place to keep documents. A central archive also supported a monarch's government, since it physically held the documents that justified his rule.

After several earlier attempts, the idea of an official archive for Castile took shape in Simancas, and almost five decades later, in 1588, the archive received detailed regulations on how it was to work.

== Location: the Castle of Simancas ==
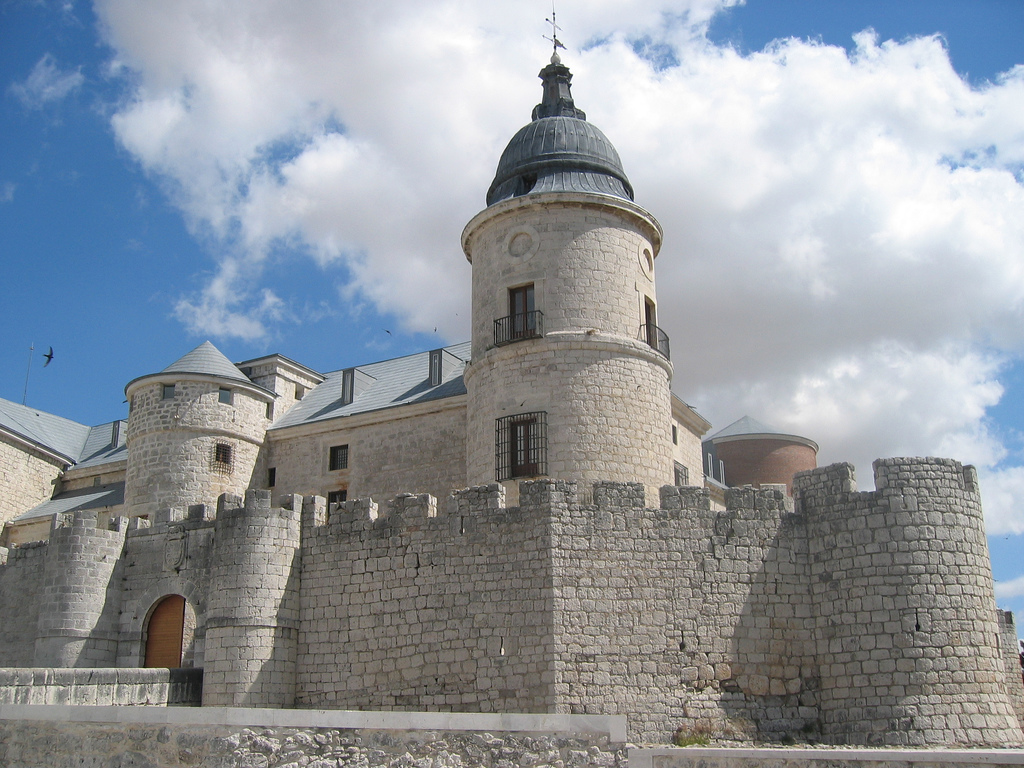
Side view of the castle.

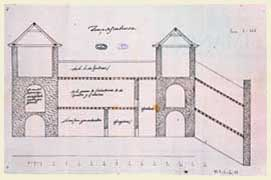
16th-century plan showing the rooms occupied by the archive inside the castle at the time.

The archive was placed in Simancas, a town 10 km (6.2 mi) from Valladolid. The site was not chosen at random: a fortress was considered a safe place for an archive.

During the Reconquista the town of Simancas was important as a frontier post, and its strategic position between the kingdoms of León and Castile gave it a role in the politics of the peninsula. After the conquest of Toledo in 1085 it lost importance, and in the 13th century it became just one more village under the jurisdiction of Valladolid. It did not remain so for long: in 1465 King Henry IV of Castile rewarded Simancas for staying loyal to him in his conflict with the supporters of the Infante Alfonso, granting nobility (hidalguía) to all its inhabitants and exempting the town from the jurisdiction of Valladolid. The period from the second half of the 15th century to the early 17th century was the most brilliant in the history of Simancas, and the establishment of the archive belongs to it.

Until 1917 historians dated the fortress of Simancas to the early centuries of the Reconquista. That year a guide to Spanish archives published under the direction of Francisco Rodríguez Marín made known a passage from a 16th-century manuscript history of Simancas, which says that the old fort had been taken by Admiral Fadrique Enríquez in the reign of Henry IV and later demolished and rebuilt by his son, Admiral Alonso Enríquez de Quiñones. The present fortress can therefore be dated to between 1467 and 1480.

The castle has been so heavily altered that its original appearance is almost impossible to know. The Catholic Monarchs took effective possession of it in 1490, and since then it has undergone all kinds of changes, many of them to adapt it to the archive.

Many factors influenced the choice of the castle. Two stand out:

- Once the frontiers of the Christian kingdoms had moved south, the castle had no specific role in peacetime. It was therefore put to other uses, from an arms store to a state prison, a role it kept for a time alongside that of archive.
- Francisco de los Cobos, Comendador Mayor of León, who was a member of Charles I's circle and the governor (alcaide) of the fortress, used his influence to have the archive placed there.

From the foundation of the archive onwards, the building underwent all kinds of works of adaptation and enlargement. It was designed to keep documents, not for research, and its decoration was meant not simply to embellish but to express royal power. One of the doors of the archive, for example, bore the coat of arms of Philip II.

Since the castle was not designed to house an archive, it had drawbacks that worried archivists over the centuries. The most important was the risk of fire, aggravated by the presence of the prison in the same building. As a fortress, the building was also caught up in armed conflicts: during the Peninsular War (1808–1814) a French garrison occupied it, with grave consequences for the archive.

Critics of the location were not lacking in the 19th and 20th centuries, and proposals to move the documents from Simancas were frequent. One of the strongest voices was that of Agustín González de Amezúa, who argued for moving the whole archive to Madrid.

== History ==
=== Precedents and foundation ===
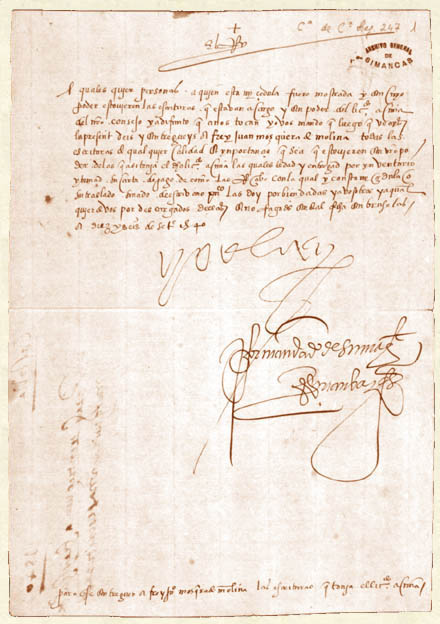
Cédula of Charles I, issued in Brussels on 16 September 1540, ordering documents to be sent to Simancas; it is one of the founding documents of the archive.

Compared with the archives of other European crowns, the foundation of the Simancas archive shows an evident delay on the part of Castile, although historians have identified several earlier attempts to create an archive. The most widely repeated account is that John II of Castile and Henry IV of Castile ordered some documents to be gathered in a particular place; this was never fully carried out but is cited as a precedent. Another account, poorly supported by the written sources, holds that an archive existed in Burgos in the early 16th century and was destroyed by the comuneros.

The clearest precedent was the archive that Ferdinand the Catholic tried to organise in 1509, entrusting it to the bachelor Diego Salmerón, who died in 1519 without completing it. His successors in the post, the licentiates Galindo and Acuña, left no trace of having done anything with the task.

The archive dates from 1540. In that year Charles I issued in Brussels a cédula that was the first order to send documents to the castle of Simancas. At first the archive shared the building with a prison, but the determination to create a large central archive was clear: works to adapt the building were carried out in 1542 and 1543, while the first consignments of documents were being received.

=== 16th century ===
Among the first documents to reach the castle were those kept in the castle of La Mota at Medina del Campo, where some have seen another precedent of Simancas.

In 1545 the licentiate Antonio Catalán was appointed the first keeper (tenedor) of the archive, and from then on the archive existed as an institution and not merely as a project. Catalán held the post for less than two years, but his tenure was productive in the recovery of documents: in 1545 and 1546 numerous cédulas were issued across Castile ordering documents to be handed over to the archive.

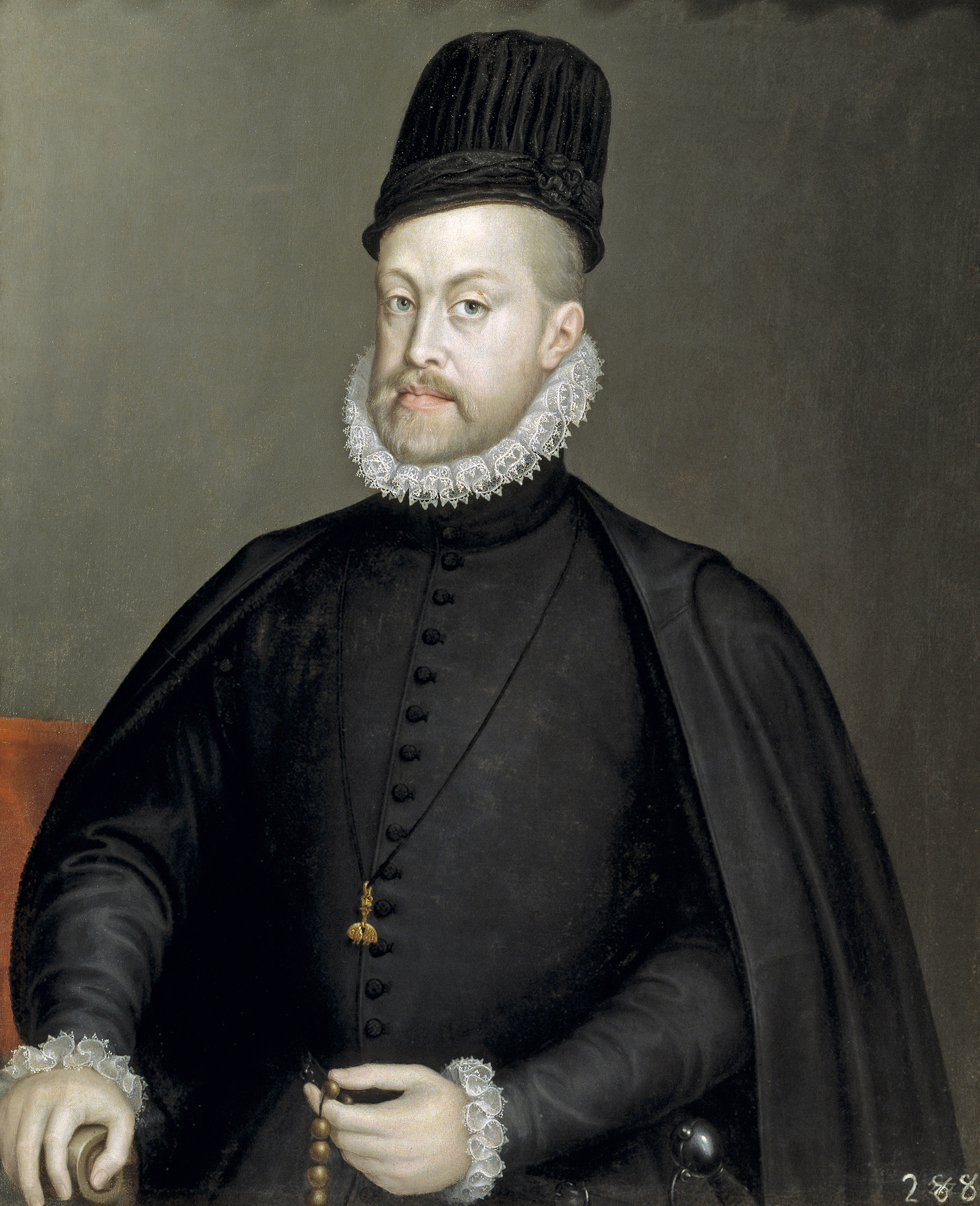
Philip II issued the Instruction for the government of the archive in 1588 and visited it in 1592, when he ordered further works.

After Catalán's death in 1547 the post went to Diego Briviesca de Muñatones. His tenure was not as fruitful as might have been hoped: he took possession of the post only in 1548, left the work to his brother, and in the eleven years he held it he lived in Spain for only three. In 1559 he gave it up because he was going to the Indies.

The years that followed were among the most irregular in the life of the archive. To remedy the situation, in 1561 Philip II divided the post between two men: a lawyer, the licentiate Sanci, and Diego de Ayala, who had experience in handling documents and official business. They were joined in running the archive by Tomás Bretón, the deputy governor of the fortress. This arrangement did not last: Sanci died in August 1562, and in 1563 the deputy governor's key and allowance were withdrawn as unnecessary, leaving Diego de Ayala alone in charge.

Ayala's long tenure can be divided into two stages:

- 1563–1574: he put the archive in order and catalogued it;
- from 1574: he carried out constant works to enlarge it.

Little is known of the first years, up to 1564. One known fact is that in 1572 Ayala travelled to Madrid to collect documents, among them fifty-three chests of papers concerning the Indies. From 1575, as the great works of enlargement advanced, the fortress gradually lost its character as a prison.

Juan de Herrera took part in the works of remodelling, giving the courtyard its present proportions. The works always went hand in hand with the gathering of documents, and the archive had the help of leading cultural figures of the time: in 1567 orders were issued so that the historian Jerónimo Zurita could work with its documents, and in 1572 he handed over papers to Ayala.

The second stage was marked by Ayala's complaints that the archive shared the building with a prison, which in his view greatly increased the risk of fire. At the same time he tried to enlarge the archive as much as possible, which from 1588 onwards caused serious financial problems. There were contradictory moments: Philip II visited the archive in 1592 and ordered all kinds of new works, for which little money was then provided. At times there was no money to pay either Ayala's assistants or the workmen.

In this second stage, in 1588, came a milestone: the Instruction that Philip II issued for the government of the Simancas archive. Drafted mainly by Ayala together with the royal secretaries Vázquez and Zayas, it set the number of officials, their working hours and pay, and ordered among other things that no original documents be taken out, that no light or fire be lit, and that the most important documents be copied to protect the originals. Later writers on the archive have praised it highly.

Diego de Ayala died on 16 February 1594, aged 82, after years in which he had to borrow money to keep the works going. Although his last years were troubled by money problems and ill health, a great many documents, many of them of high value, were collected in that period.

During this time the building was also used as a prison and to store furnishings, weapons and even money.

=== 17th century ===
Diego de Ayala was succeeded by his son, Antonio de Ayala Manuel, who knew the work well because he had stood in for his father during absences and illnesses. He held the post until his death in 1610, and during his tenure the archive's officials became permanent staff.

The arrival of documents continued alongside the works. There were also researchers wishing to consult the documents, such as the chronicler Pedro de Valencia, although such access was rarely granted.

From this time onwards a pattern can be seen in the documents that arrived: apart from some large consignments, most were papers from the ministries that had piled up, had lost their current value and were sent to Simancas to free space.

After Antonio de Ayala's death came a turbulent period of short tenures. From Juan Gallo, who never took possession, to Diego de Isla, who was archivist for about two years, there was no stable head until Diego de Cepeda, who held the post from 1617 to 1630.

During Cepeda's tenure Francisco and Antonio de Hoyos, father and son, were sent to inspect the archive. Later historians have judged them harshly, because most of their inventories were mere lists of bundles without analysis. In any case this was a period of transition, waiting for Juan de Ayala Tello to come of age.

The heir of the Ayala family held the post from 1630 to 1656. At first everything seemed favourable – he was young and had experience – but problems soon followed. Difficulties with his brother Diego, whom he had chosen as one of his officials, and the Instruction issued by Philip IV in 1633, which ordered the archive to follow the method of Antonio de Hoyos, weakened his position. He was also obliged to report every year on the state of the archive.

Philip IV authorised the Count-Duke of Olivares to form his own collection of documents, and Juan de Ayala's tenure as a whole has been seen as confused and of little effect. He was retired in 1656; in 1640 he had obtained the right to be succeeded by one of his sons, and in the meantime the archive was run by Pedro García de los Ríos until 1659.

The second half of the 17th century was dominated by Pedro de Ayala, another member of the family, who ran the archive from 1659 to 1698. On his arrival he found an archive without funds, with the works halted and many bundles not yet put on the shelves, so the first decade of his tenure was devoted almost entirely to seeking money.

In 1670 he even threatened to resign, and after many journeys and requests he obtained thirty thousand ducats for works, which were carried out until 1675. Meanwhile all kinds of documents entered the archive, the most notable being 61 boxes from the secretariats of the Council of War, for both land and sea.

Pedro de Ayala died in 1698, having named his eldest son, Francisco Antonio de Ayala, as his successor. The new century did not change the fact that historians of the early modern period had no access to the archive for research except in very particular cases.

=== 18th century ===
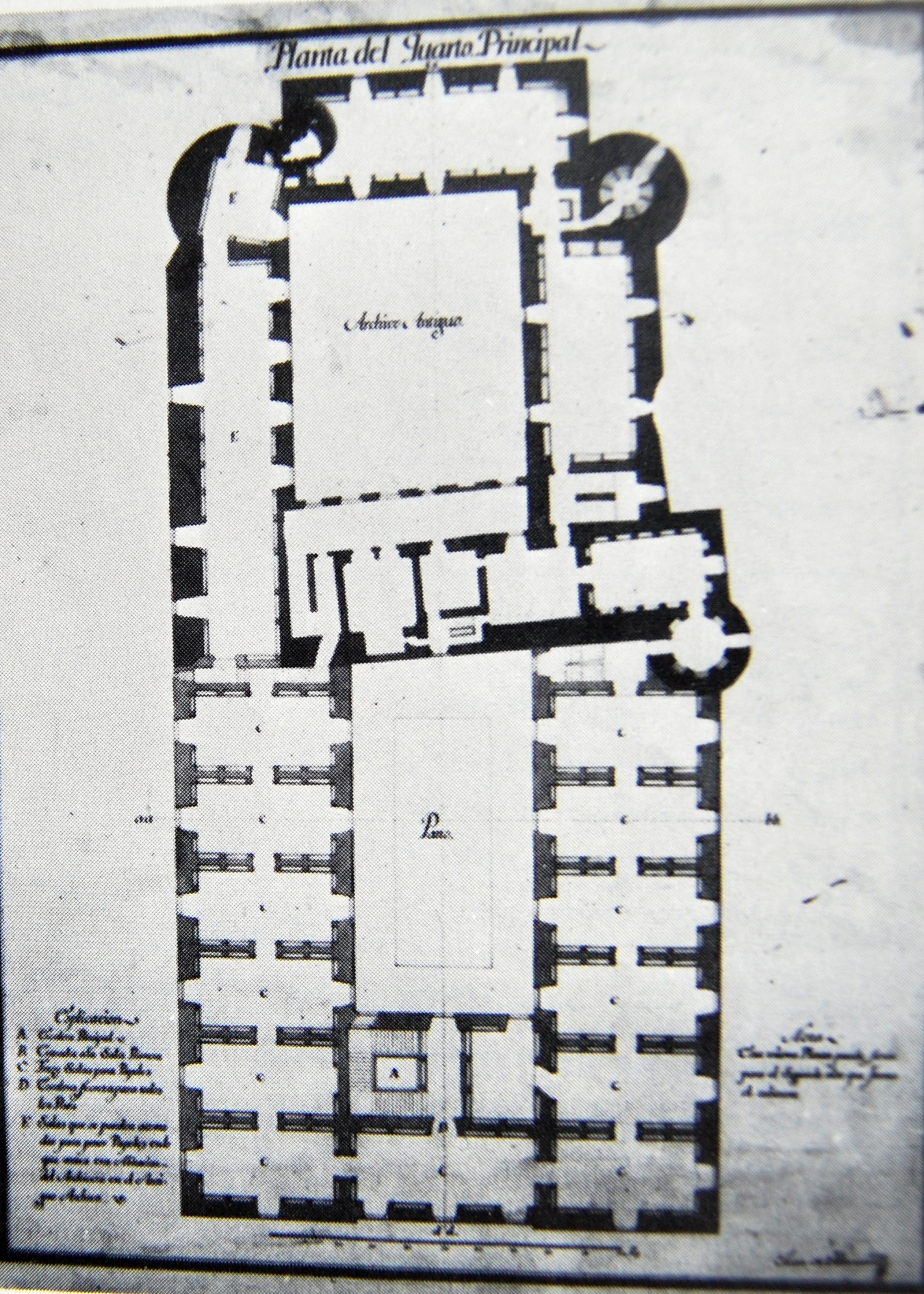
Plan for enlarging the main floor of the archive, drawn up by Juan de Villanueva.

The first half of the 18th century was marked by the tenure of Francisco Antonio de Ayala, who ran the archive from 1698 to 1743. With him began a situation that lasted until about 1815: almost the whole staff of the archive belonged to the Ayala family. In 1710 Philip V visited Simancas.

His tenure had its successes – many documents of the last Habsburgs arrived – and its setbacks: in 1727 a tower and part of the wall of the outer enclosure collapsed, and much money had to go into urgent works. Documents of great importance arrived in this period, such as the will of Charles II and Philip V's renunciation of the French crown.

When Francisco Antonio de Ayala died in 1743 he was succeeded by his son Manuel Santiago de Ayala Gallo, who ran the archive until 1772. Researchers such as Ascensio de Morales worked in the archive at this time, and accounts left by visitors of the period describe how the archive was run and what conditions they found there.

Exceptional documents arrived in this period, such as the Concordat of 1753. There were also difficult moments, such as the general repair of the castle in 1749, which included works against the damp that was damaging the documents in the lower rooms. The castle was also affected by the 1755 Lisbon earthquake.

Manuel Santiago de Ayala Gallo died in 1772. His son Manuel de la Cruz Ayala y Rosales, who had been made an official of the archive at the age of seven, with a substitute doing the work until he could do it himself, was appointed archivist in 1773, at the age of 25; he held the post until his death in 1811. Other notable events of the 18th century were the visit of the Count of Floridablanca in 1773 and the transfer in 1785 of all the documents on the Indies – one of the strengths of the Simancas holdings – to the General Archive of the Indies, newly created in Seville. In 1791 Gaspar Melchor de Jovellanos visited the archive and criticised its staff as idle.

=== 19th century ===
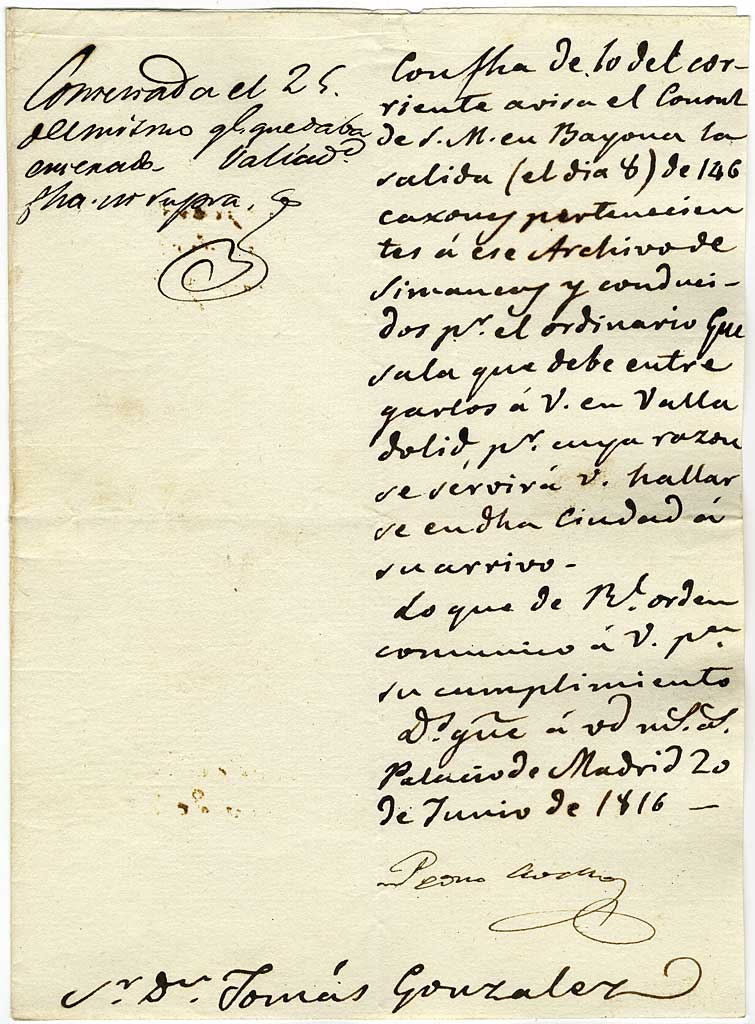
Royal order of 20 June 1816 sending Tomás González to Valladolid to receive 146 boxes belonging to the archive. They were returning from Bayonne, where they had been taken on Napoleon's orders during the French invasion.

The new century was marked above all by the harm the Peninsular War did to the archive. French soldiers were quartered in the fortress, the archive's staff lost all authority and their work stopped, and the kitchen the garrison needed in the building was a fire hazard. In 1811 Manuel de la Cruz Ayala died, ending the line of archivists of the Ayala family.

An official report of 1817 described the archive as left in utter confusion by the calamities of the war, with most of its papers loose and thrown on the floor. Documents had been moved from place to place without any order, and a fire in the garrison's kitchen forced bundles to be moved in haste.

Part of the documents was taken to France, because Napoleon wanted to create a great central European archive in Paris and had already plundered archives in Germany, Austria and Italy. General Kellermann was ordered to move documents to Bayonne and then to Paris. Most of them came back after Napoleon's fall, except those on relations between Spain and France, which were returned only during the Second World War.

To restore order in the archive, Tomás González was appointed royal commissioner in 1815. Apart from a few consignments – the last ones arrived in 1852 – the archive stopped receiving documents and became a closed archive.

Ferdinand VII arranged for several consignments of documents to be sent to Simancas between 1826 and 1832, not for cultural or conservation reasons but to separate his ministers from the information the papers contained. He also visited the archive in 1828.

A royal order of April 1844 opened the archive, at least in general terms, to research, and historians such as Manuel Danvila and Antonio Cánovas del Castillo were able to work there. Documents on the private life of the royal family, however, were excluded.

From then on, Spanish archive administration developed on an official footing: in 1858 the professional corps of archivists was created, and the work of Simancas was redirected towards cataloguing and dissemination. The first display case for exhibiting documents dates from the directorship of Francisco Díaz Sánchez (1869–1890).

Notable events of the second half of the century include the visit of King Alfonso XII in 1878, the directorship of Claudio Pérez Gredilla in the last decade of the century, and the arrival of the telephone in 1894.

=== 20th century ===
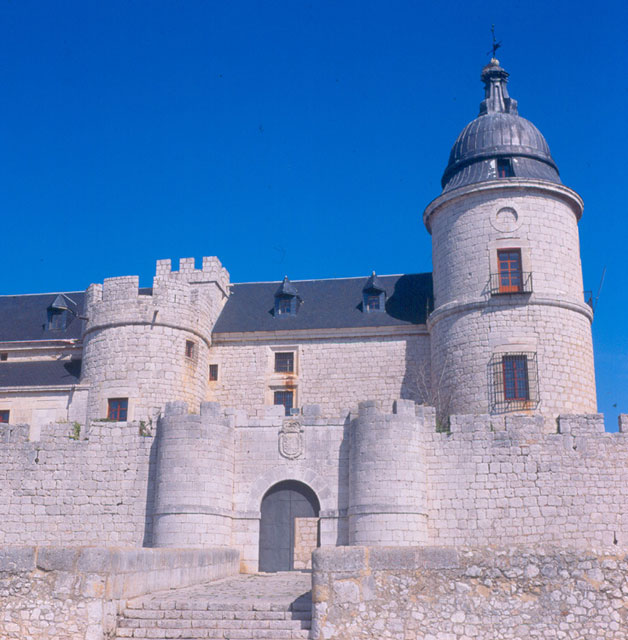
Colour slide of the castle that houses the archive, last third of the 20th century.

During the 20th century the facilities were greatly improved to make the researchers' work easier. The exhibition of documents kept growing, and the archive came to be regarded as a cultural institution in which the conservation of documents goes hand in hand with research and exhibition, under the Ministry of Culture.

In 1914 the documents of the Inquisition were transferred from Simancas to the National Historical Archive in Madrid in exchange for some 700 bundles, which drew protests in Valladolid; in 1917 a proposal to move other major series to Madrid provoked protests throughout the province and was dropped.

During the Spanish Civil War the province of Valladolid was in the Nationalist zone from the start, and some improvements were carried out at the archive between 1936 and 1938. In the 1950s, at the time of the fourth centenary of the death of Charles I, a major reform was undertaken to meet the demand of the growing number of researchers wishing to work in Simancas, and a residence for researchers was built.

In 1941 the Spanish government recovered a group of documents – about 58,000 – known as the "Simancas bundles" (legajos de Simancas), through an exchange of works with the Vichy government of Marshal Pétain. Their return was complicated. In the same agreement Spain also recovered works such as the Immaculate Conception of Soult and the Lady of Elche, and in return gave France several works of art, mainly paintings.

Despite all the comforts brought by the modern age, discomfort remained the rule for researchers in the 20th century. González de Amezúa described the only inn in Simancas as a wretched place.

=== 21st century ===
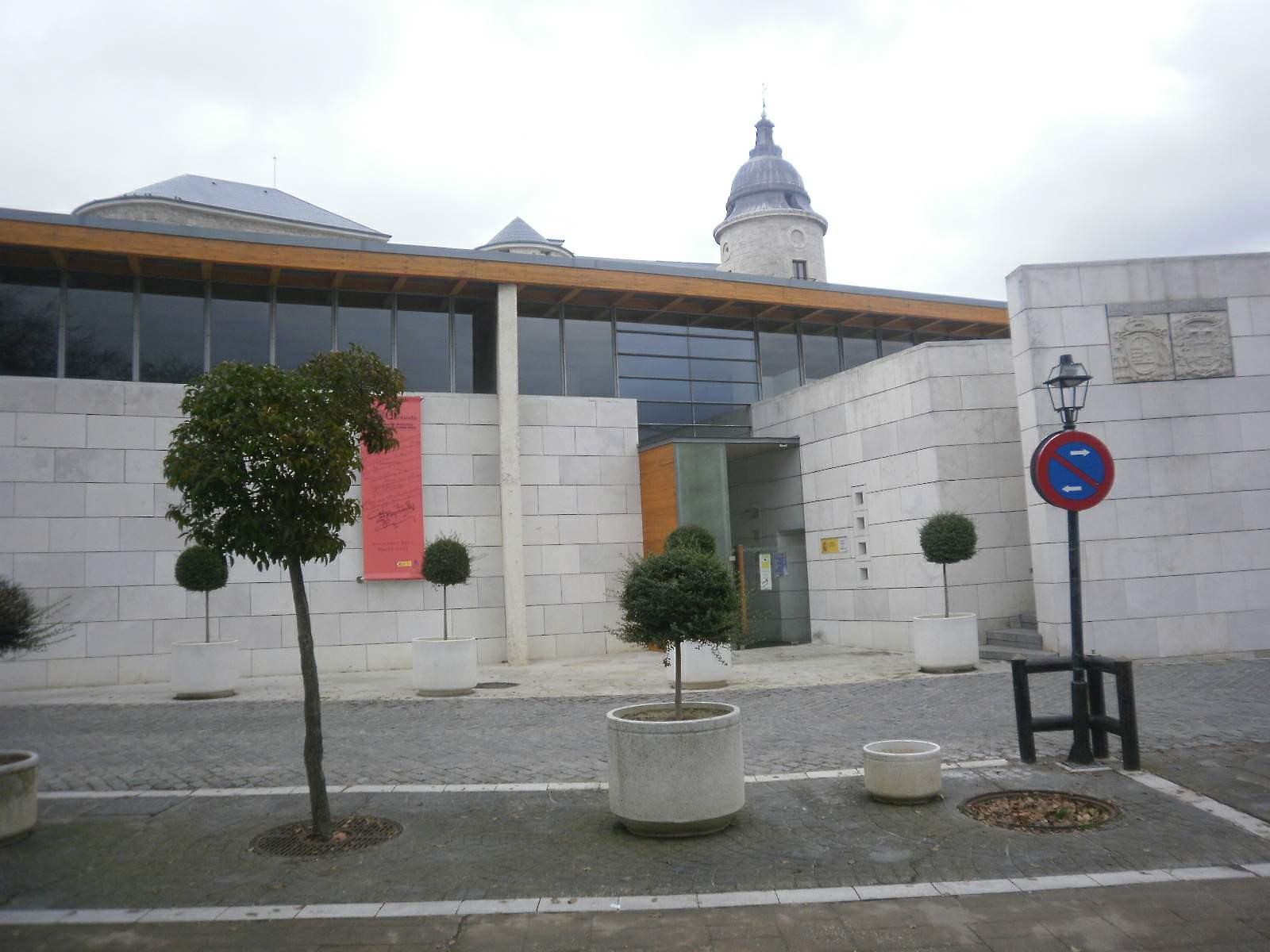
The archive was renovated between 1999 and 2007.

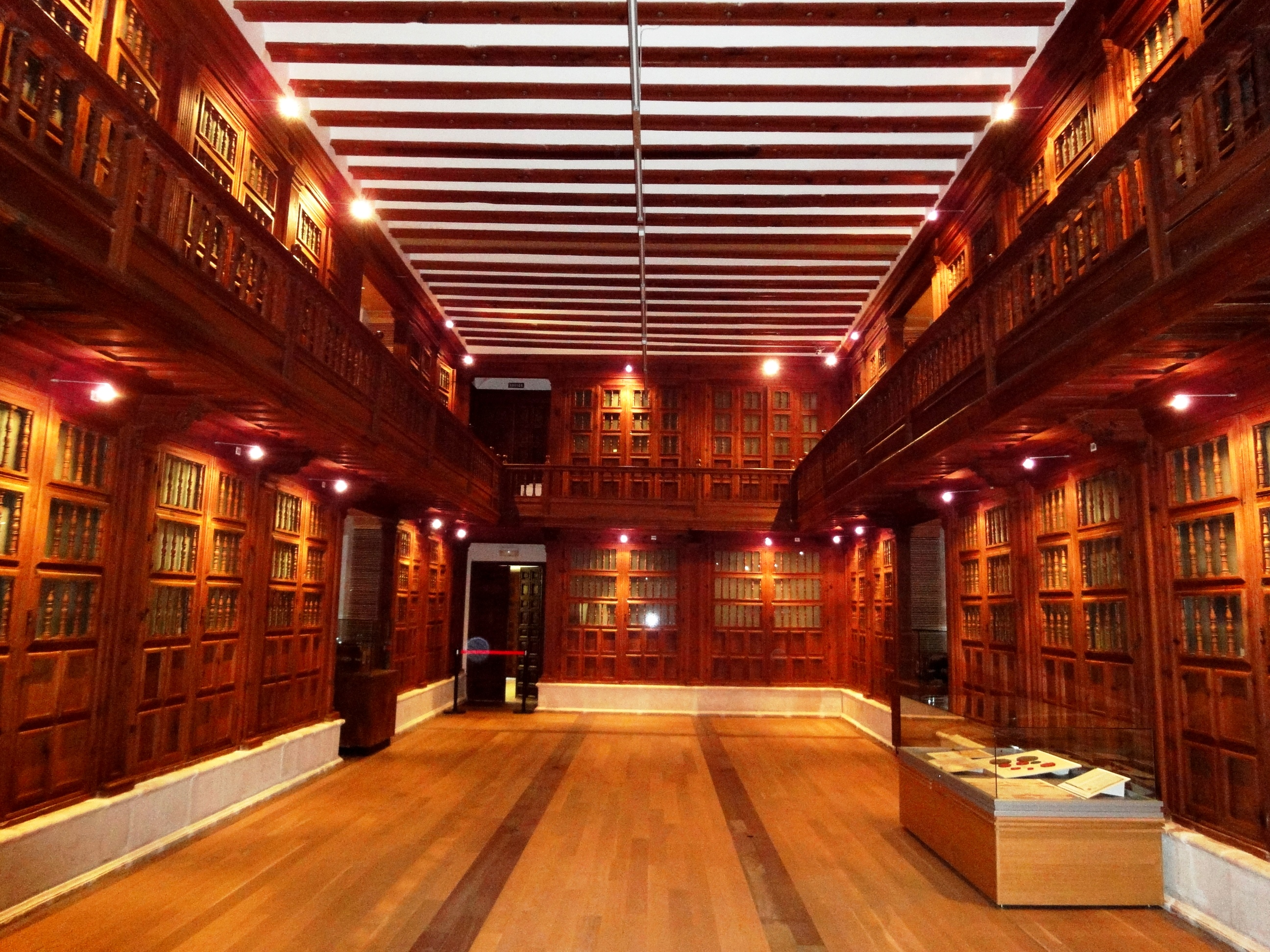
Part of the archive's library, 2011

At the turn of the 21st century the archive was renovated in a programme of works that lasted from 1999 to 2007. The works were originally expected to end in 2004, but the delay meant that events planned at the castle for the fifth centenaries of the deaths of Isabella the Catholic and Christopher Columbus could not be held there. The director of the archive, José Luis Rodríguez de Diego, attributed the delays to heavy rain.

On 14 January 2008 the Minister of Culture, César Antonio Molina, inaugurated the renovated building. At the ceremony he said that in Simancas the richness of the "documentary content derives from its architectural project". Since then the archive has hosted various cultural events, including a meeting of the board of the Fundación Camino de la Lengua Castellana in 2009. After this latest reform, visitors can see parts of the archive that were previously closed to them, such as one of the research rooms and the castle chapel. A building has also been put up next to the fortress, with an assembly hall, an archival centre, a dissemination department and an exhibition room.

Reproductions of the documents can be requested in digital and paper form; requests for purposes other than research involve accepting the ministry's conditions and, where applicable, signing an agreement with it.

In 2017 UNESCO added the archive to its Memory of the World register.

== Sections and holdings ==
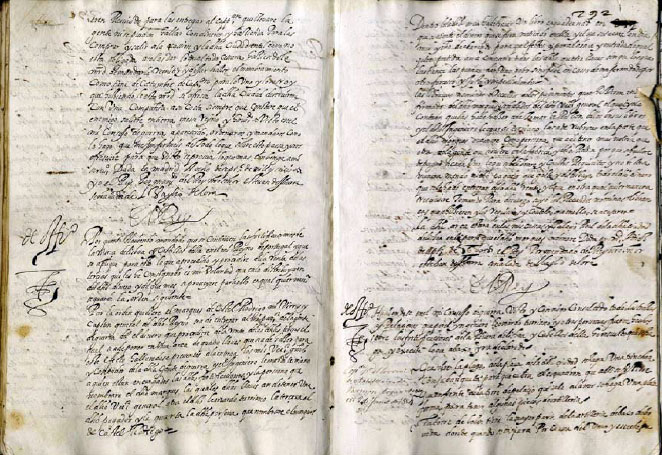
Real cédula of 16 September 1600 issued by the Council of War, kept at Simancas

The organisation of the archive reflects its history. Since it was fed mainly by administrative records arriving in successive consignments, its sections and holdings follow that course.

There are almost thirty sections, which De la Plaza Bores groups into eight:

- Patronato Real (Royal Patronage): a collection put together by Diego de Ayala between 1564 and 1567. It does not come from any particular institution but is the result of the archivist's selection. Documents continued to be added to it occasionally until the 19th century, but the tendency was not to separate documents from the consignments that reached Simancas, so most of the collection dates from the time of the Catholic Monarchs, Charles V and Philip II. Because of the documents it contains, it is considered the most valuable part of the archive.
- Secretariats of the Council of State (15th–17th centuries) and Diplomatic Correspondence of the 18th century: the most consulted section of the archive. Its oldest part consists of a wide variety of documents gathered during the first attempts to create a central archive in Castile, but once the archive was established, consignments from the Council of State arrived regularly and systematically. It contains more than 8,000 bundles, whose main subject is Spain's relations with other states.
- Secretariats of the Councils of Flanders, Italy and Portugal (16th–17th centuries): these documents have traditionally been called "provincial", because they come from councils that governed a particular territory rather than dealing with general matters of the monarchy. The section has long caused confusion, since much of the documentation of the Councils of Flanders and Portugal reached Simancas together with a consignment from the Secretariat of the Council of State. They are, however, entirely separate records belonging, as their name indicates, to those councils.
- Secretariats and scriveners' offices of the Council of Castile and the Cámara de Castilla (15th–17th centuries): very varied documents, since the Royal Council of Castile had very broad powers, with advisory, legislative and judicial functions. Its records could in theory hold the history of Castile from the 15th to the 19th century, but this is not so, because there was much carelessness both in collecting and in keeping them. (Note: One telling episode is that in 1577 Diego de Ayala went to the Royal Council of Castile to collect documents kept in some chests, and was told that by order of the Council they had been handed out to royal ministers, each taking the ones he wanted.)
- Registro del Sello de Corte (Register of the Seal of the Court, 1475–1689): the archivists have given it various names, such as "Registro de Corte" for Diego de Ayala or "Registro general de Corte" for Riol. It holds more than 2,500 bundles of documents issued by the royal government and authenticated with the great seal.
- Casa Real – Obras y Bosques (Royal Household – Works and Woods, 15th–17th centuries): this group has two clearly different parts. "Casa Real" is a compilation made by Mariano Alcocer, who brought together documents concerning members or property of the royal family. "Obras y Bosques" holds the records of the Junta de Obras y Bosques, the body responsible for the upkeep and enlargement of the royal estate in the broad sense, from palaces to hunting grounds. The documentation reached the archive in very fragmentary form and is difficult to consult.
- Secretariats of the Council of War (15th–17th centuries) and Secretariats of State for War (18th century) and the Navy (18th century): the records of the army and navy. The three parts total more than 13,000 bundles and books, making this one of the largest and most complete sections of the archive. The division reflects the origin and nature of the records: the "Guerra y Marina" section, also called "Guerra Antigua", holds the papers of the Council of War from the time when its secretariat dealt with both land and sea, before it was divided around 1586; "Secretaría de Guerra" contains mainly 18th-century records of the Secretariat of State and of the Office for War created by Philip V's administrative reform; and "Secretaría de Marina" contains about 750 bundles and 75 books from the Secretariat of State and of the Universal Office of the Navy.
- Hacienda (Finance): more than half of the archive, about 38,000 bundles, including records of the secretariats and scriveners' offices of the Council of Finance (15th–17th centuries), the Contaduría Mayor de Hacienda (15th–17th centuries), the Contaduría Mayor de Cuentas (15th–18th centuries), the Dirección General de Rentas (18th century) and other bodies. These are mainly administrative records, very useful for economic studies. Because of their volume, it can be said that all the documentation on the economic history of the Crown of Castile from the 15th to the early 19th century is in Simancas, with some exceptions, such as the records in the Central Archive of the Ministry of Finance or the juros in the National Historical Archive.

The archive also holds documents on the Kingdom of Navarre.

== See also ==
- List of collections in the Archivo General de Simancas (in Spanish)
- List of archives in Spain
- General Archive of the Crown of Aragon
- National Historical Archive
- Archivo General de Palacio
- National Library of Spain
- Gustav Bergenroth
- Treaty of Tordesillas

== Bibliography ==
- González de Amezúa, Agustín (1945). "El Archivo General de Simancas y la historia de España" [The General Archive of Simancas and the history of Spain] (PDF). Revista Nacional de Educación (in Spanish) (54): 11–30. Archived from the original (PDF) on 28 December 2011.
- Martínez García, Luis (1999). "El Archivo de Simancas en el Antiguo Régimen: secreto, patrimonio, justificación y legitimidad real" [The Archive of Simancas under the Ancien Régime: secrecy, patrimony, justification and royal legitimacy]. Boletín de la ANABAD (in Spanish). 49 (2): 77–116.
- Plaza Bores, Ángel de la (1992). Archivo General de Simancas: guía del investigador [General Archive of Simancas: researcher's guide] (PDF) (in Spanish) (4th, corrected ed.). Madrid: Ministerio de Cultura. ISBN 84-7483-853-3. Page numbers refer to the PDF edition published by the Ministry of Culture.
