= Simancas =

- Municipality
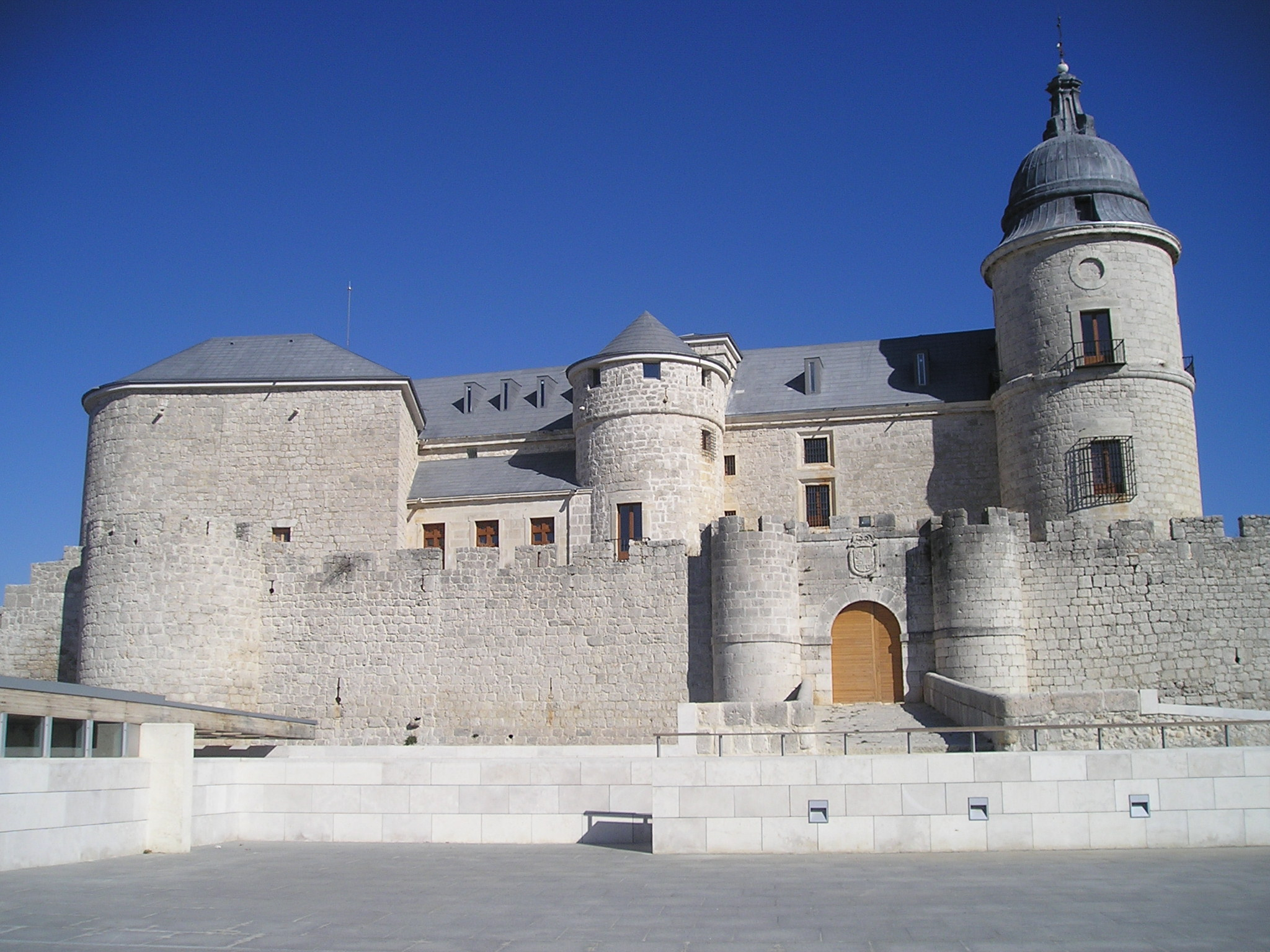
- Simancas Castle (late 15th-early 16th centuries)

- Coat of arms

- Location in Spain
- Coordinates: 41°35′30.9″N 4°49′43.1″W
- Country: Spain
- Community: Castile and León
- Province: Valladolid
- Comarca: Campiña del Pisuerga

Government
  - Mayor: Miguel Fernando Rodríguez Ramón

Area
  - Total: 42.53 km^{2} (16.42 sq mi)
- Elevation: 725 m (2,379 ft)

Population (2025-01-01)
  - Total: 5,533
  - Density: 130.1/km^{2} (336.9/sq mi)
- Demonym: Simanquinos
- Time zone: UTC+1 (CET)
  - Summer (DST): UTC+2 (CEST)
- Postal code: 47130
- Website: Official website

Simancas is a town and municipality of central Spain, located in the province of Valladolid, part of the autonomous community of Castile and León. It is situated approximately 10 km southwest of the provincial capital Valladolid, on the road to Zamora and the right bank of the river Pisuerga.

Simancas originated as the Roman Septimanca.

== Main sights ==
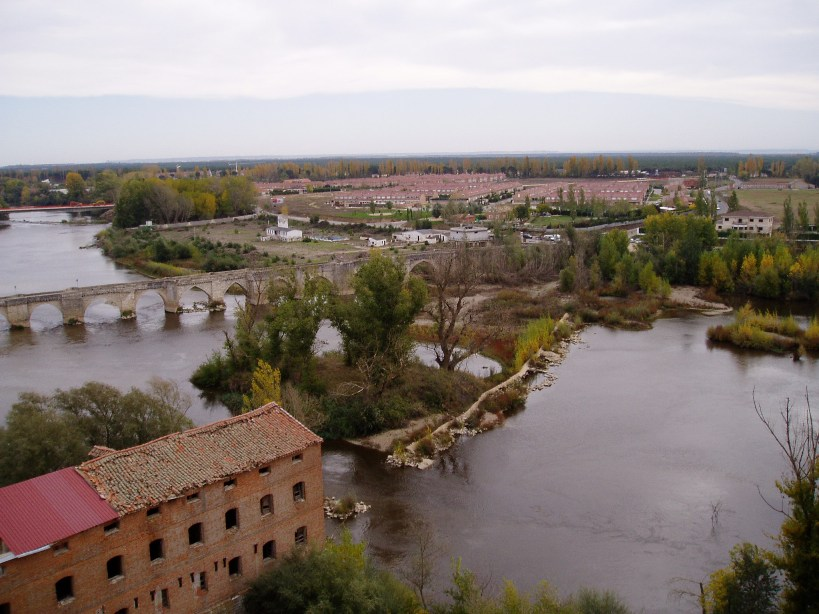
View of the medieval bridge over the Pisuerga River as seen from el Mirador.

Sights include a citadel dating from the Al-Andalus period in the 9th century, a bridge of seventeen arches, and many remains of old walls. In 939 it was the scene of a battle between the Christian troops under Ramiro II of León and the Moors of Abd-al-Rahman III.

The citadel is now the Archivo General de Simancas, sometimes called the Archivo General del Reino, to which the national archives of Spain were removed by order of Philip II in 1563. Their transference thither was first suggested to Charles V by Cardinal Ximenes de Cisneros. The extensive alterations were made by three 16th-century architects, Juan de Herrera, Alonso Berruguete and Juan Gómez de Mora; the arrangement of the papers was entrusted to Diego de Ayala.

They occupy forty-six rooms, and are arranged in upwards of 80,000 bundles (33,000,000 documents), including important private as well as state papers. The archives of the Indies were transferred in 1784 to the Lonja of Seville. Permission to consult the documents at Simancas can be readily obtained.

== History ==
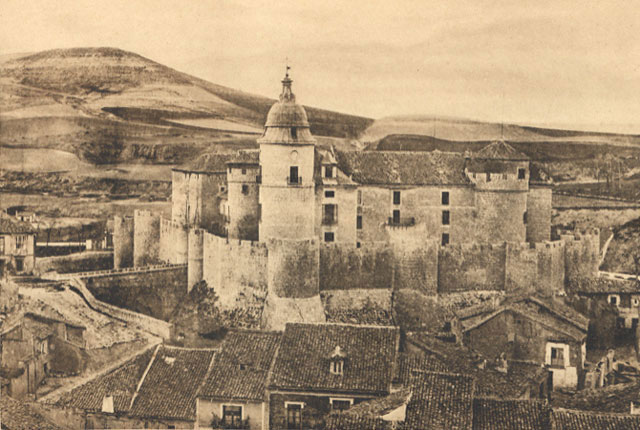
The Castle of Simancas at the beginning of the 20th century.

On the outskirts of Simancas lies the megalithic tomb of Los Zumacales, a cromlech-type funerary monument of the Neolithic period. In the Roman era the city was known as Septimanca in the territory of the Vaccaei.

A medieval bridge sits over the Pisuerga river, constructed after the previous Roman one. Until the 12th century Simancas was, together with Cabezón, the most important town of Valladolid province. It was occupied by the army of Alfonso I in 753 and definitively conquered by Alfonso III in 883.

The legend of the Tribute of the Seven Maidens holds that in the time of Abd al-Rahman II there existed a tribute named for the seven Simancan maidens who were handed over each year to Arab chieftains. However, on one occasion when the women were to be turned in, each one cut off one hand in an act of rebellion. The king Ramiro then uttered the phrase that would later give its name to the town: “Si mancas me las dais, mancas no las quiero” (“If maimed you give them to me, maimed I want them not”).

In the year 939 the Battle of Simancas was fought before the walls of the city between the Christian troops of Ramiro II and the Muslim caliph Abd al-Rahman III.

Around the middle of the 18th century the place was described as follows:

The town has three principal buildings, the first the fortress or Royal Archive, carved in ashlar masonry, where the Kings of Spain have their archive of all papers which belong to the Crown, and to all the kingdom; just as they do of the royal patronage, like those of the knights of Spain, Naples, Sicily. Across the river there is another grand palace with an excellent view, and in it was born the emperor Ferdinand, brother of Charles V; here he was then when his grandfather the Catholic King passed; and to this place came the embassy of Burgos to surrender itself to him as the history of Charles V attests, written by Prudencio de Sandoval his chronicler. And in the middle of the village is the Church of the Savior, with beautiful and magnificent marble architecture and a vault of stone as evidenced by the same factory.

— Taken from the manuscript of Manuel Bachiller (1755)

In 1812 there was a new Battle of Simancas between the Coalition troops (Spanish, English and Portuguese) commanded by the Duke of Wellington, against the army of Napoleon, which had retreated after the Battle of Salamanca.

== Culture ==
=== Folklore ===
==== History of the “Tribute of the Seven Maidens” ====
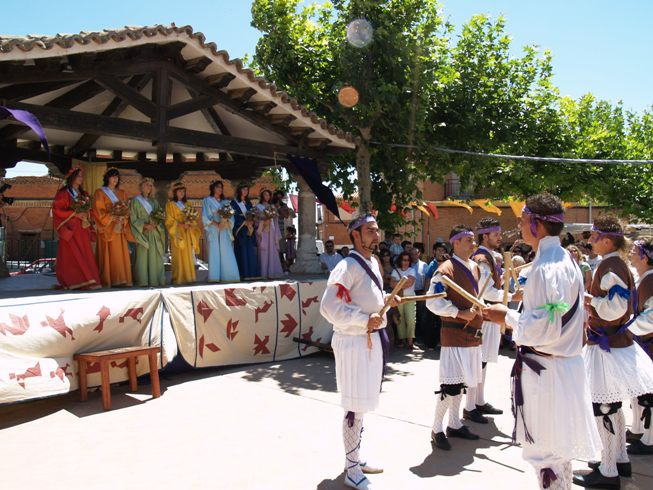
Doncellas y paloteo, a historical festival of Simancas.

In the year 783, Mauregatus (the bastard son of Alfonso I of Asturias) took the Asturian throne with the help of Abd al-Rahman I, to whom he pledged the tribute payment of one hundred maidens for his assistance. In the year 788, the counts Don Arias and Don Oveco rebelled against Mauregatus and slew him as vengeance for enacting this tribute to the Moors. King Bermudo I, his successor, wished to cease the tribute, substituting for it a monetary payment. Bermudo was succeeded by Alfonso II the Chaste who, rejecting the tribute in gold as well, fought the Moors victoriously in the Battle of Lutos, killing the Moorish captain and ceasing the practice.

Later Abd al-Rahman II, during the reign of King Ramiro I, attempted to restart the tradition of the hundred maidens. Ramiro found himself in a weak position and agreed to pay the tribute once more. With the tribute in force again, there arose the legend that the people of Simancas sent in their required seven maidens; however, their hands had been cut off. It is said that the young women, in an act of great courage, decided to cut off one hand each to avoid their fate, and according to legend proceeded to do so. As a consequence the Christians then went to battle the Moors, which resulted in the Battle of Clavijo. The Moors were then defeated and the tribute of the hundred maidens ended, and the Christians established the Voto of Santiago in gratitude.

The patron festival of the Savior is celebrated on 6 August, which commemorates the history of the maidens of Simancas.

Each year in the middle of July, since the establishment of the tradition in 1994, forty-one people have reenacted the Oath of King Ramiro II de León. It commemorates the historical Battle of Simancas where the Christian troops destroyed the army of Abd al-Rahman III, and the subsequent pledge of the king to never again use the young women of Simancas as currency in the face of Moorish demands.

The Oath marks the conclusion of the annual cycle for the seven young women of Simancas, who surrender their ceremonial roles on August 6 to make way for the next year's participants. During the preceding Requerimiento ("Summoning"), the town mayor visits the home of each newly selected participant, who wears traditional medieval attire, to officially initiate the new cycle. According to festival organizer Teresa Salvador, director of the Asociación El Zancón, the celebration is derived from Astur-Leonese folklore with historical antecedents that have been adapted into local tradition over time.

While the “Summoning” of the seven young women has been celebrated since 1988, according to a project presented to the local government by Salvador, the Oath which marks the end of the story is only twelve years old.

==== Danza de los Lazos ====
In Simancas a traditional dance exists related to the Pascua de Resurrección, celebrated to its greatest extent at the beginning of the 20th century. Called the danza de los Lazos ("dance of the bows"), it features twelve young men from the area. They dress in a special outfit consisting of a white shirt, a woman’s underskirt, white shoes and stockings with a bow tied at the knee, a purple sash across the chest, and a striking, high-topped hat adorned with flowers. A character known as the Zárraga carrying a whip with a ball at the end accompanies the dancers.

The dance starts in the town square where the Zárraga announces the following: "Se va a echar un lazo a la salud del señor alcalde" ("The mayor’s health is going to be tied up"). The participants then walk the streets, stopping in front of the houses of the richest and most generous citizens, dancing the lazo in front of them and subsequently receiving a prize of money.

== See also ==
- Cuisine of the province of Valladolid
