= Castle of Simancas =

- Castillo de Simancas
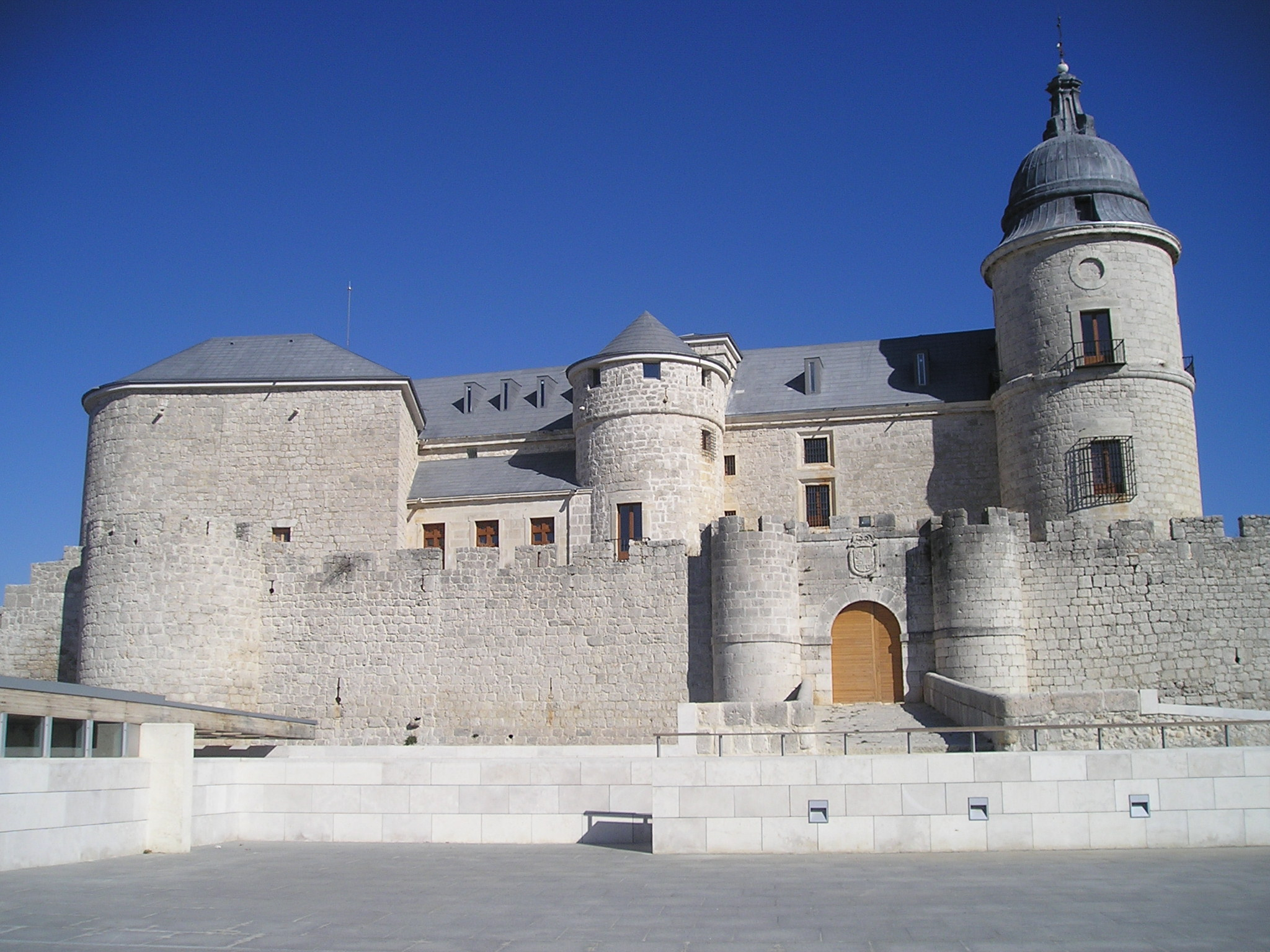
- Castle of Simancas, site of Archivo General de Simancas.
- Interactive map of the Castle of Simancas area

General information
- Location: Simancas, Province of Valladolid, Castile and León, Spain
- Coordinates: 41°35′31″N 4°49′44″W
- Current tenants: Archivo General de Simancas
- Construction started: late 15th Cent
- Renovated: 1952 and 2007

The Castle of Simancas (also known as Simancas Castle) is a fortified complex in Simancas, central Spain. The castle stands in the centre of town and houses the current Archivo General de Simancas.

== History ==
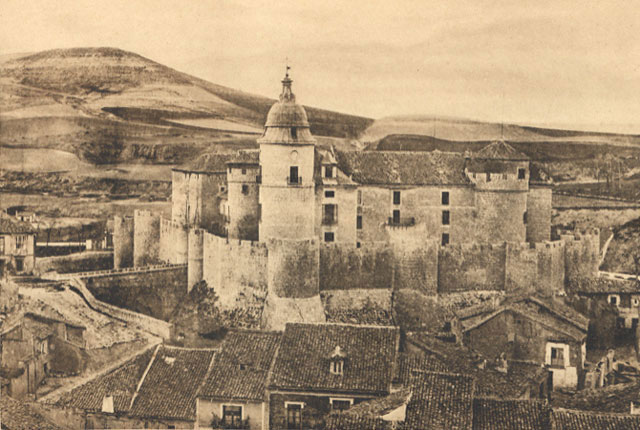
The castle at the beginning of the 20th century.

The site of the castle was at one time a Moorish fortress. In the 15th century the House of Enríquez constructed a new fortification on top of the existing ruins, restored the Moorish walls, and added a chapel. The new castle was seized by the Spanish Crown during the reign of the Catholic Monarchs and turned into a prison. In 1540 the Archivo General de Simancas was established in the castle, the first official archive of Castile. Felipe II transformed the castle into General Archive of the Kingdom, which housed one of the most important archives in Europe with 35 million documents.

The castle was put under the protection of the Spanish government in 1949. In 1952 renovations were enacted to reduce risk to the archives. The castle is now open to tourists and researchers.

== Fortification and structure ==
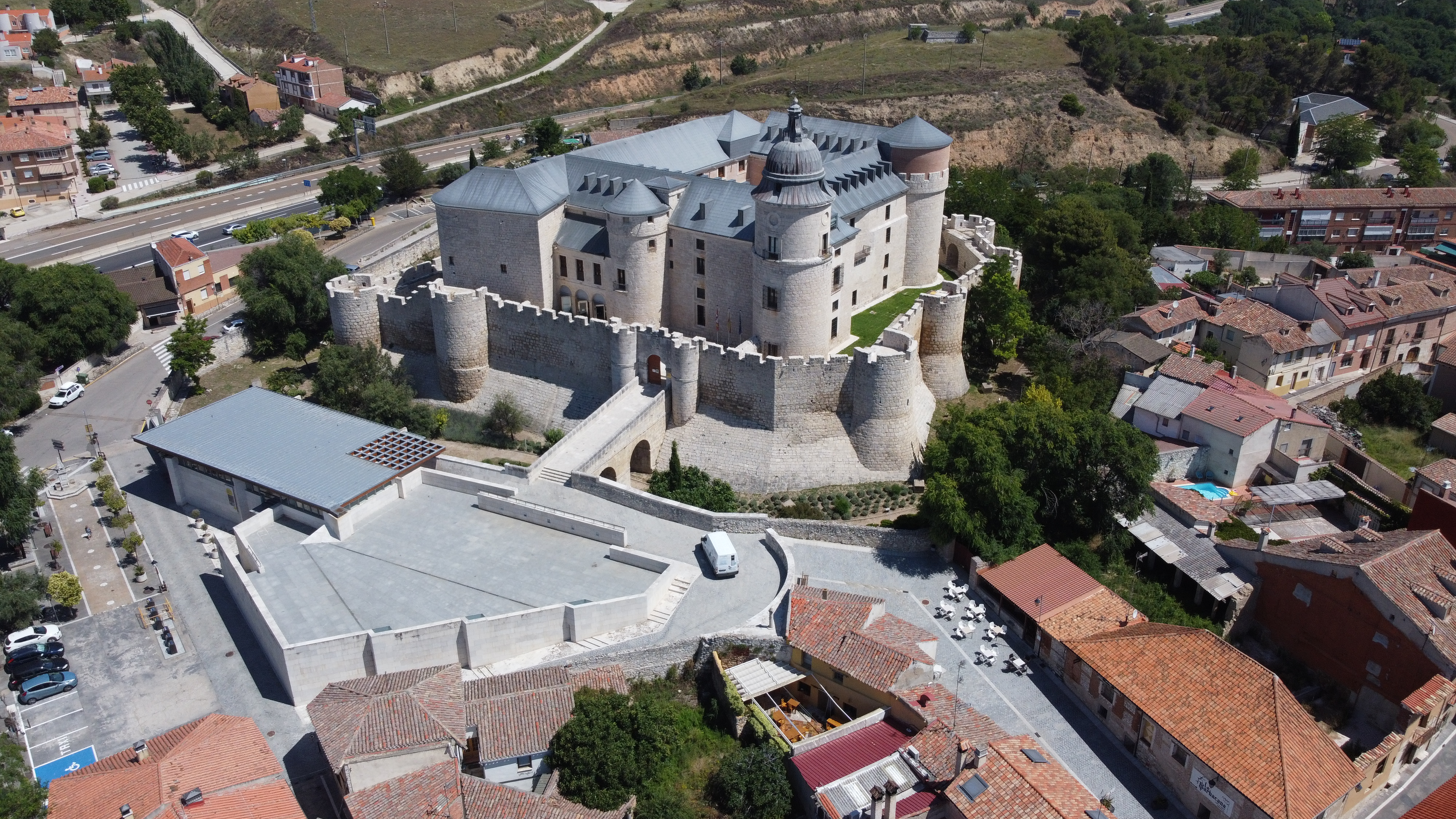
Aerial view of the castle, year 2023.

The castle's foundation, walls, battlements, gates, and bridges all date back to the late 15th century, mostly attributed from 1467 to 1480. The end of the Reconquista in 1492 ended the immediate need for a large defensive fortification, and as such the castle's various reconstructions moulded it into an administrative building. Later additions to the castle incorporate aspects of the Herrerian style of architecture.

The current archive housed within the castle has been protected with fireproofing measures, and the 15th-century chapel built by the Enríquez has been restored.
