= Archivo General de Palacio =

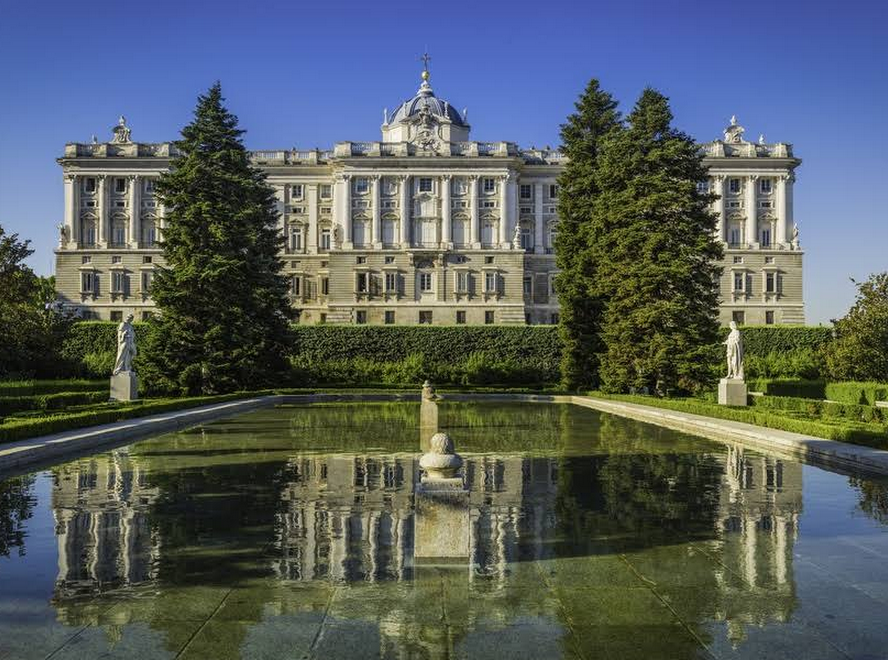
The Royal Palace of Madrid preserves the Archivo General de Palacio.

The General Archive of the Palace (Spanish: Archivo General de Palacio) is a Spanish national archive in Madrid created by Ferdinand VII in 1814 with more than 120 millions of documents from the 12th century until now. It collects, classifies and preserves all the documents from the Patrimonio de la Corona and the Spanish royal family. The current director is Juan José Alonso.
