= Municipal Archive of Valencia =

Arxiu Municipal de València
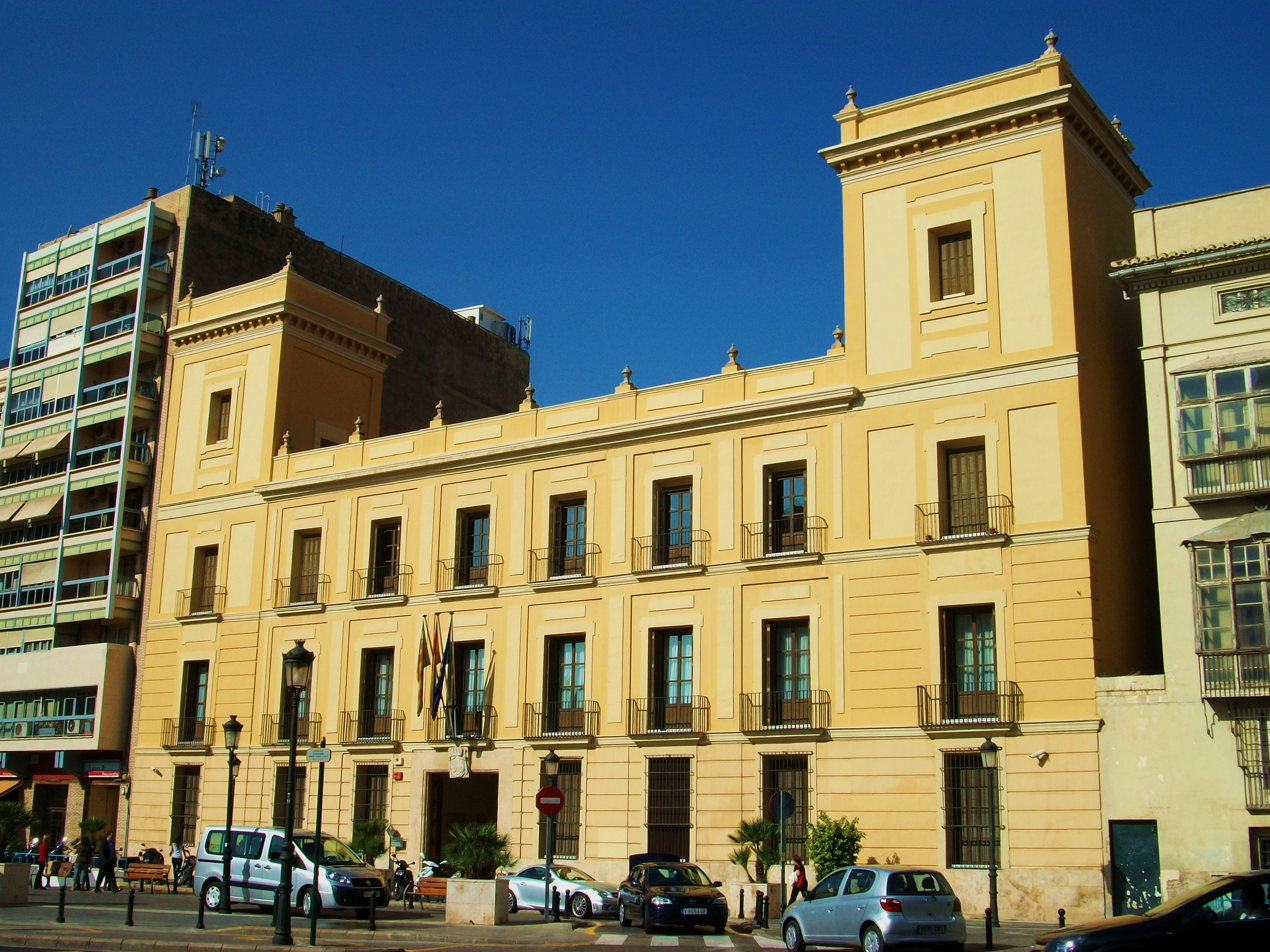
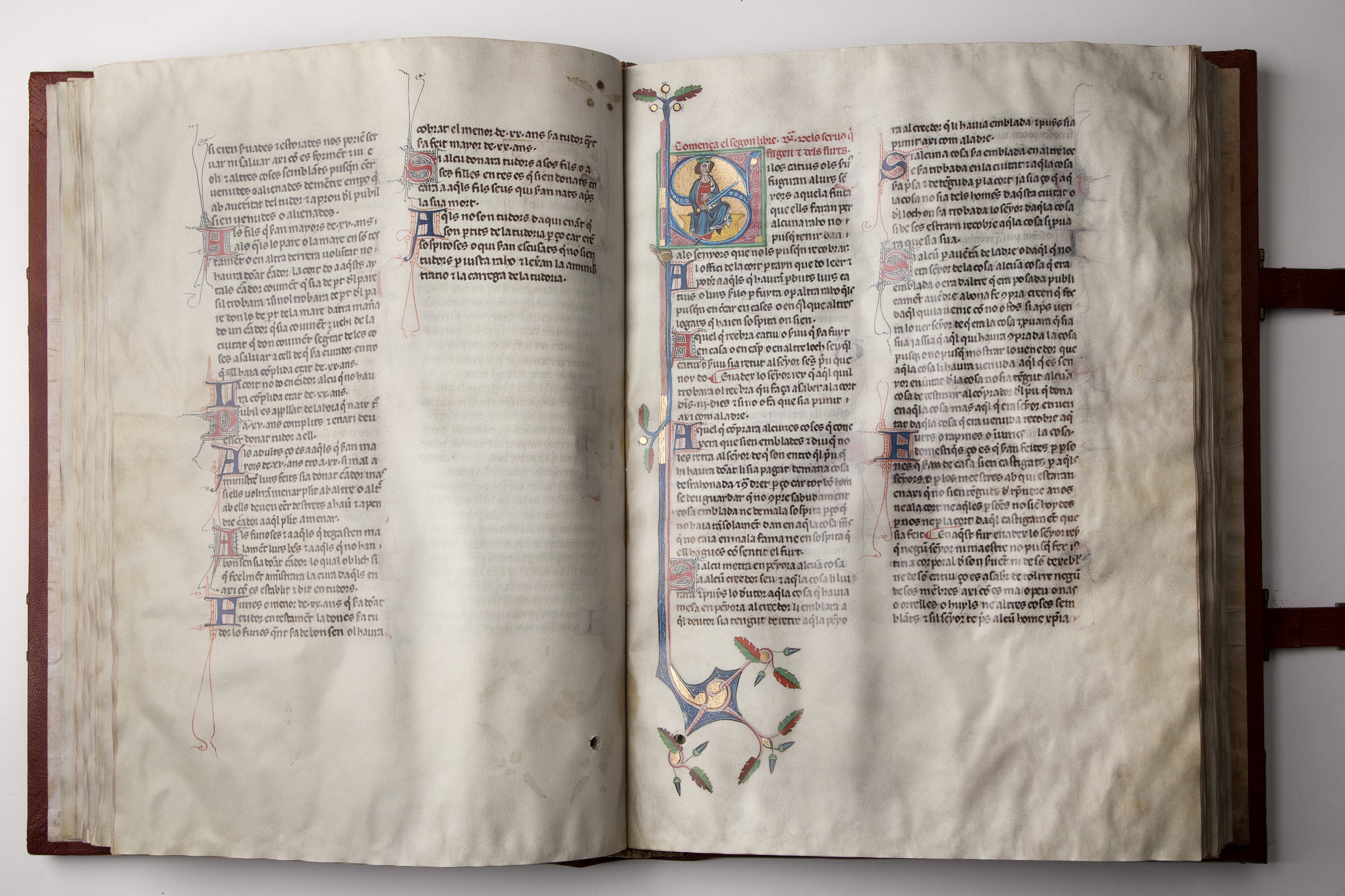
- Top: Façade of the Palau de Cervelló, the historic site of the Valencia's City Archives. Bottom: A page from the Furs de Jaume I (1238-1271), local regulations of the Kingdom of Valencia.
- Interactive map of Arxiu Municipal de València
- 39°28′27″N 0°22′13″W
- Location: València, Spain
- Type: Public archives
- Established: 1238
- Period covered: 1226–20th century
- Website: cultural.valencia.es/archivo/arxiu-historic-municipal/

The Historical Archive of the City of València (or València Municipal Archives) is the main public historical archive of the city government of València, Spain. Regarded as one of Spain's and Europe's most important municipal archives, it holds administrative, legal, economic, notarial, guild, cartographic, photographic, and civil records documenting the history of the city of Valencia and its surroundings. The archive was established after the city's conquest by king James I of Aragon in 1238, it preserves municipal records from 1239 onward from the times of the Kingdom of Valencia, with its oldest document dating to 1226.

The archival fonds have occupied several locations throughout its history and is housed in the Palace of Cervelló since 2003.

Among its most notable holdings are the medieval codices of the Furs of Valencia and the Book of the Consulate of the Sea, as well as the Council Manuals, Book of Mustaçaf, royal privileges, notarial records, and the records of the municipal Taula de Canvis (Exchange Table).

The archive also provides research services and continues the digitization and electronic preservation of its collections.
