= National Historical Archive =

- Archivo Histórico Nacional
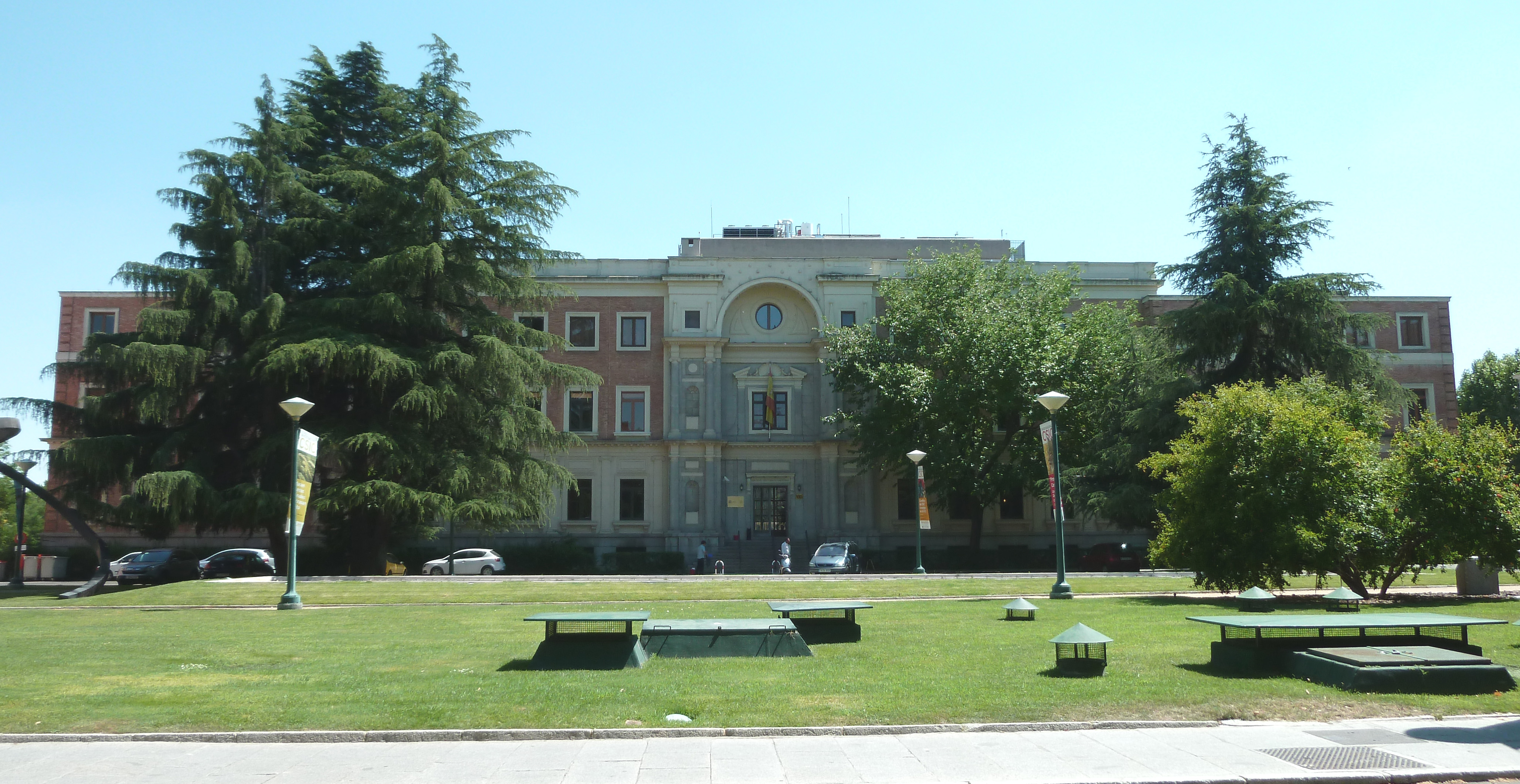
- Façade of the Spanish National Historical Archive
- Formation: 1866
- Type: National archive
- Headquarters: Madrid
- Location: 115 Calle de Serrano in Chamartín district
- Coordinates: 40°26′27″N 3°41′13″W
- Website: website

Spanish Cultural Heritage
- Type: Non-movable
- Criteria: Archive
- Designated: 22 July 1994
- Reference no.: RI-AR-0000001

The National Historical Archive of Spain (Archivo Histórico Nacional) is based in Serrano Street in Madrid. It was founded in the nineteenth century when it shared a building with the Real Academia de la Historia.

The collections of the Archive include sections housed outside Madrid, for example the General Archive of the Spanish Civil War in Salamanca.

== See also ==
- National Archives of Spain
