= Roales de Campos =

- Location of Roales de Campos in Castile and León Location of Roales de Campos in Spain
- Coordinates: 42°1′49″N 5°28′32″W
- Country: Spain
- Autonomous community: Castile and León
- Province: Valladolid
- Comarca: Tierra de Campos

Government
  - Alcalde: José Manuel Moreno Fermoso (PP)

Area
  - Total: 22 km^{2} (8.5 sq mi)

Population (2025-01-01)
  - Total: 155
  - Density: 7.0/km^{2} (18/sq mi)
- Time zone: UTC+1 (CET)
  - Summer (DST): UTC+2 (CEST)
- Climate: Csb
- Website: roalesdecampos.ayuntamientosdevalladolid.es

Roales de Campos is a municipality located in the province of Valladolid, Castile and León, Spain. According to the 2004 census (INE), the municipality has a population of 243 inhabitants.

== See also ==
- Tierra de Campos
