= Villageriz =

Coordinates: 42°07′N 5°57′W

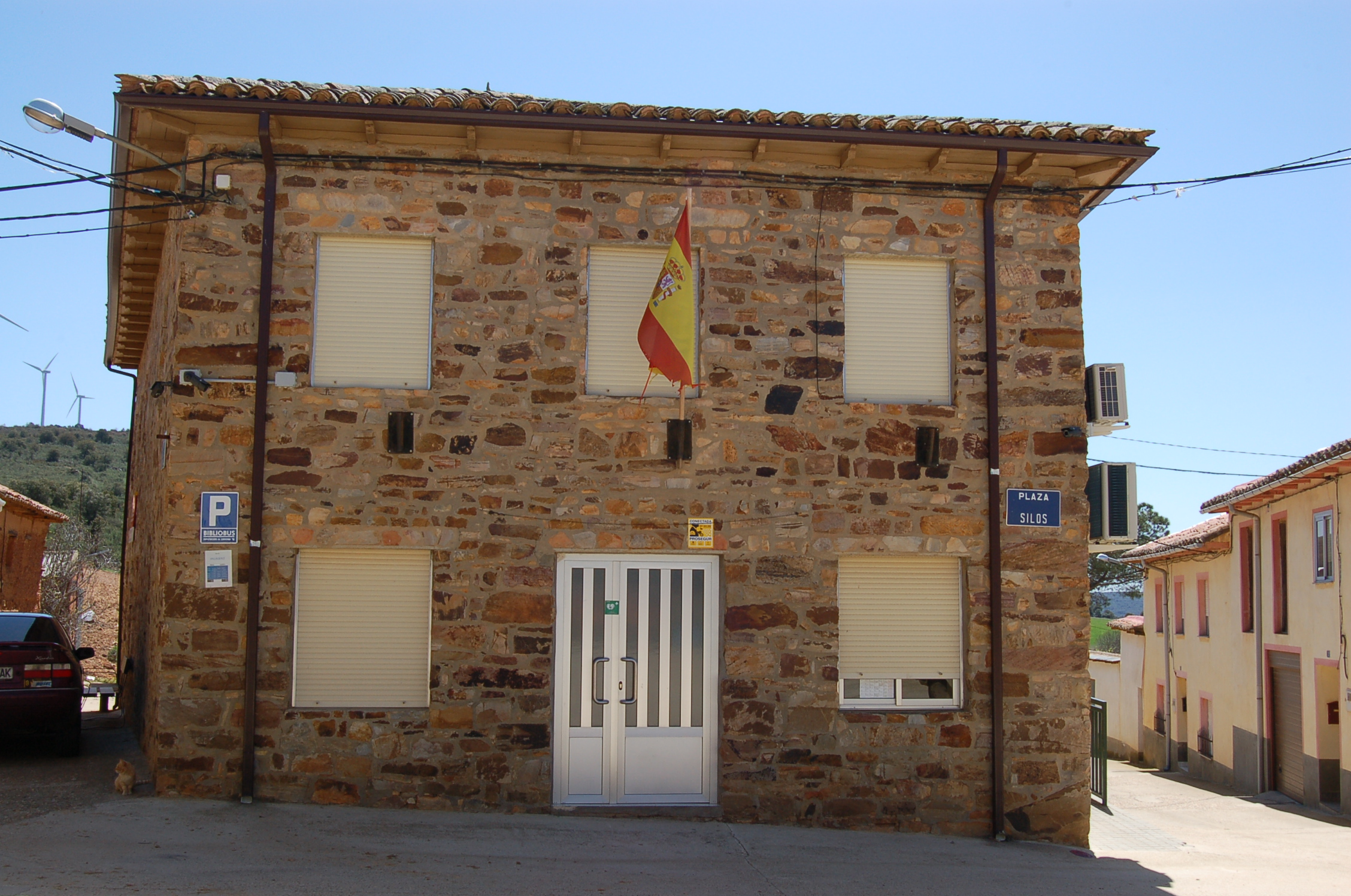
- Interactive map of Villageriz
- Country: Spain
- Autonomous community: Castile and León
- Province: Zamora
- Municipality: Villageriz

Area
  - Total: 7 km^{2} (2.7 sq mi)

Population (2025-01-01)
  - Total: 63
  - Density: 9.0/km^{2} (23/sq mi)
- Time zone: UTC+1 (CET)
  - Summer (DST): UTC+2 (CEST)
- Website: Official website

Villageriz is a municipality located in the province of Zamora, Castile and León, Spain. According to the 2004 census (INE), the municipality has a population of 59 inhabitants.
