= Gamones =

Gamones, Spain
- Coordinates: 41°28′4″N 6°10′46″W
- Country: Spain
- Autonomous community: Castile and León
- Province: Zamora
- Municipality: Gamones

Area
  - Total: 13 km^{2} (5.0 sq mi)

Population (2025-01-01)
  - Total: 89
  - Density: 6.8/km^{2} (18/sq mi)
- Time zone: UTC+1 (CET)
  - Summer (DST): UTC+2 (CEST)

Gamones is a municipality located in the province of Zamora, Castile and León, Spain. According to the 2009 census (INE), the municipality has a population of 95 inhabitants.
