= Camarzana de Tera =

Coordinates: 42°00′N 6°01′W

Camarzana de Tera, Spain
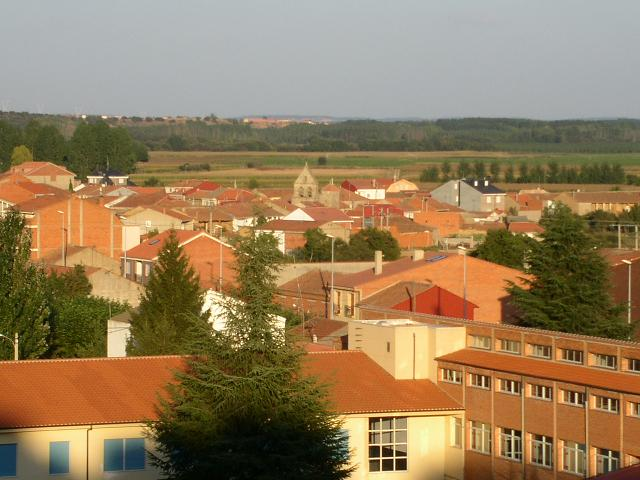

- Flag Coat of arms
- Interactive map of Camarzana de Tera, Spain
- Country: Spain
- Autonomous community: Castile and León
- Province: Zamora
- Municipality: Camarzana de Tera

Area
  - Total: 47 km^{2} (18 sq mi)

Population (2025-01-01)
  - Total: 740
  - Density: 16/km^{2} (41/sq mi)
- Time zone: UTC+1 (CET)
  - Summer (DST): UTC+2 (CEST)
- Website: Official website

Camarzana de Tera is a municipality located in the province of Zamora, Castile and León, Spain. According to the 2009 census (INE), the municipality has a population of 982 inhabitants.
