= Ferreras de Arriba =

Coordinates: 41°54′N 6°11′W

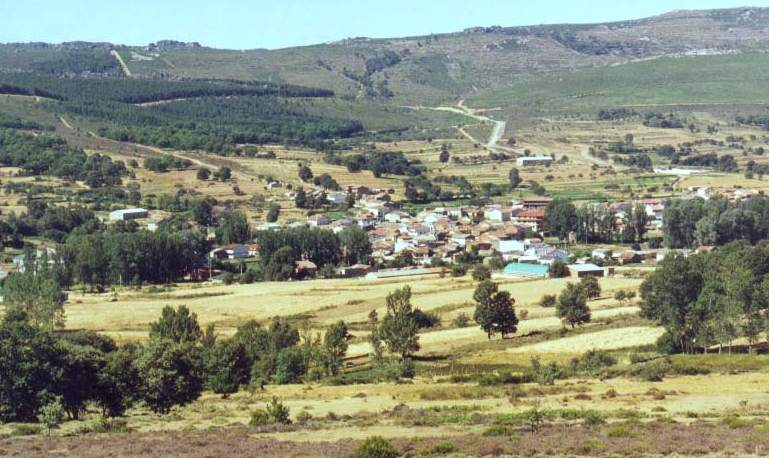
- Interactive map of Ferreras de Arriba
- Country: Spain
- Autonomous community: Castile and León
- Province: Zamora
- Municipality: Ferreras de Arriba

Area
  - Total: 48 km^{2} (19 sq mi)

Population (2025-01-01)
  - Total: 350
  - Density: 7.3/km^{2} (19/sq mi)
- Time zone: UTC+1 (CET)
  - Summer (DST): UTC+2 (CEST)

Ferreras de Arriba is a municipality located in the province of Zamora, Castile and León, Spain. According to the 2009 census (INE), the municipality has a population of 479.

The village is situated in the Reserva Natural de Caza Sierra de La Culebra natural space. Its highest point is the Miño Cuevo mountain, which is 1.211 meters above sea level.

One of its remarkable traditions is the winter masquerade of "La Filandorra", which is held on December 26.
