= Vezdemarbán =

Coordinates: 41°39′N 5°22′W

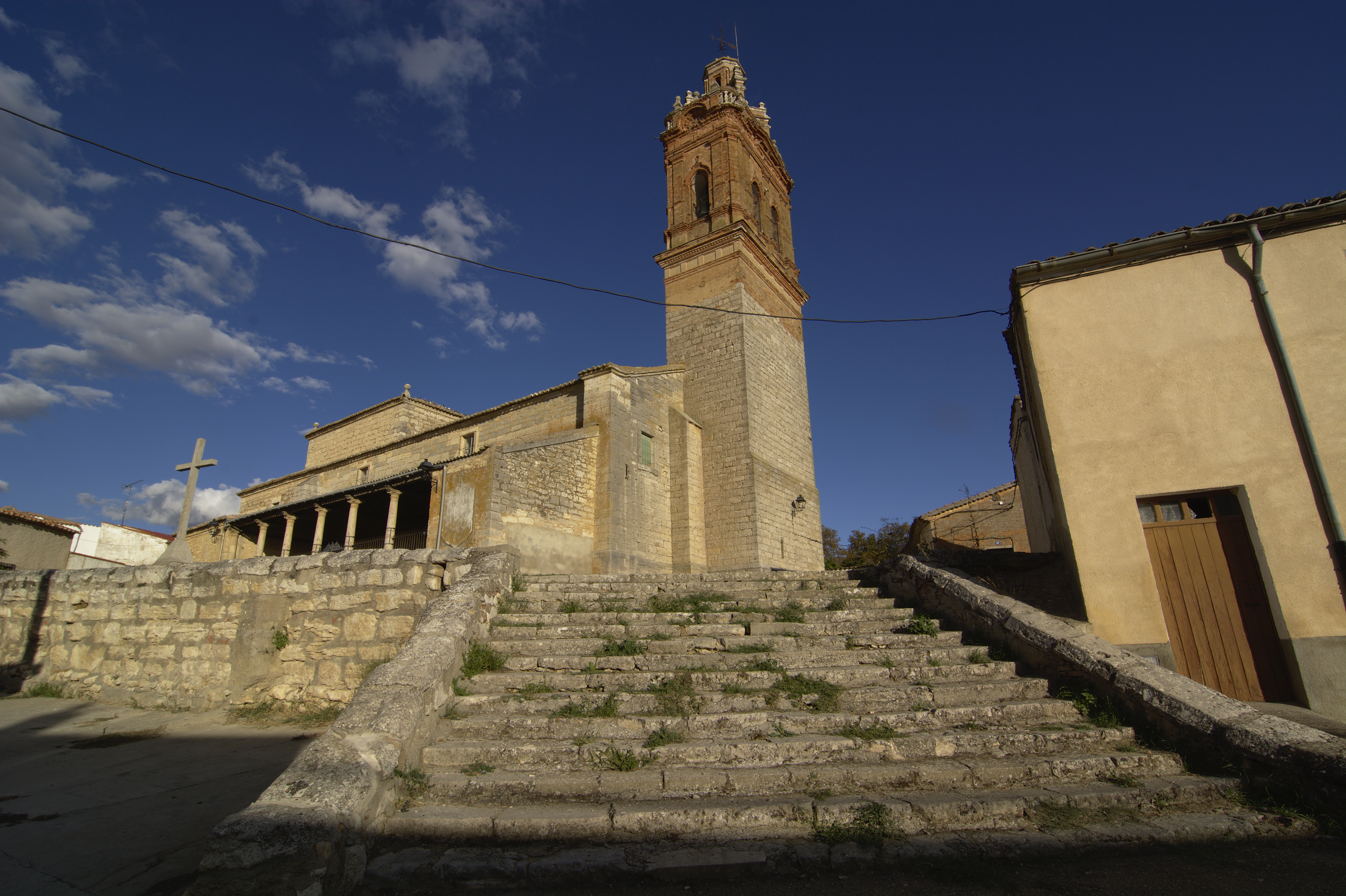
- Interactive map of Vezdemarbán
- Country: Spain
- Autonomous community: Castile and León
- Province: Zamora
- Municipality: Vezdemarbán

Area
  - Total: 47 km^{2} (18 sq mi)

Population (2025-01-01)
  - Total: 423
  - Density: 9.0/km^{2} (23/sq mi)
- Time zone: UTC+1 (CET)
  - Summer (DST): UTC+2 (CEST)

Vezdemarbán is a municipality located in the province of Zamora, Castile and León, Spain. According to the 2004 census (INE), the municipality has a population of 639 inhabitants.
