= Videmala =

Coordinates: 41°37′N 6°02′W

Videmala, Spain
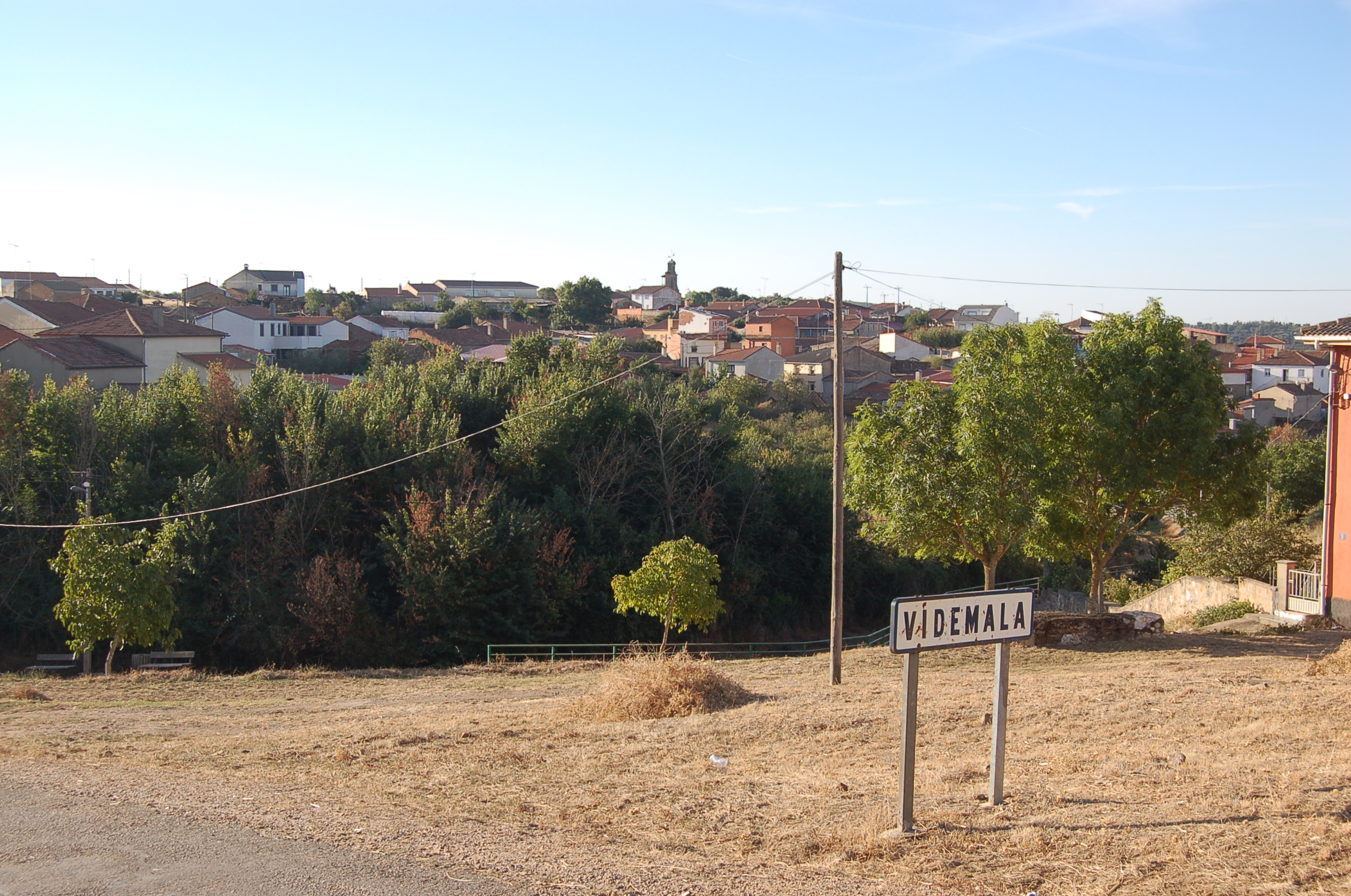
- Interactive map of Videmala, Spain
- Country: Spain
- Autonomous community: Castile and León
- Province: Zamora
- Municipality: Videmala

Area
  - Total: 25 km^{2} (9.7 sq mi)

Population (2025-01-01)
  - Total: 131
  - Density: 5.2/km^{2} (14/sq mi)
- Time zone: UTC+1 (CET)
  - Summer (DST): UTC+2 (CEST)

Videmala is a municipality located in the province of Zamora, Castile and León, Spain. According to the 2004 census (INE), the municipality has a population of 216 inhabitants.

== Town hall ==
Videmala is home to the town hall of 2 villages:

- Videmala (103 inhabitants, INE 2020).
- Villanueva de los Corchos (41 inhabitants, INE 2020).
