= Requejo =

Coordinates: 42.0333°N 6.75°W

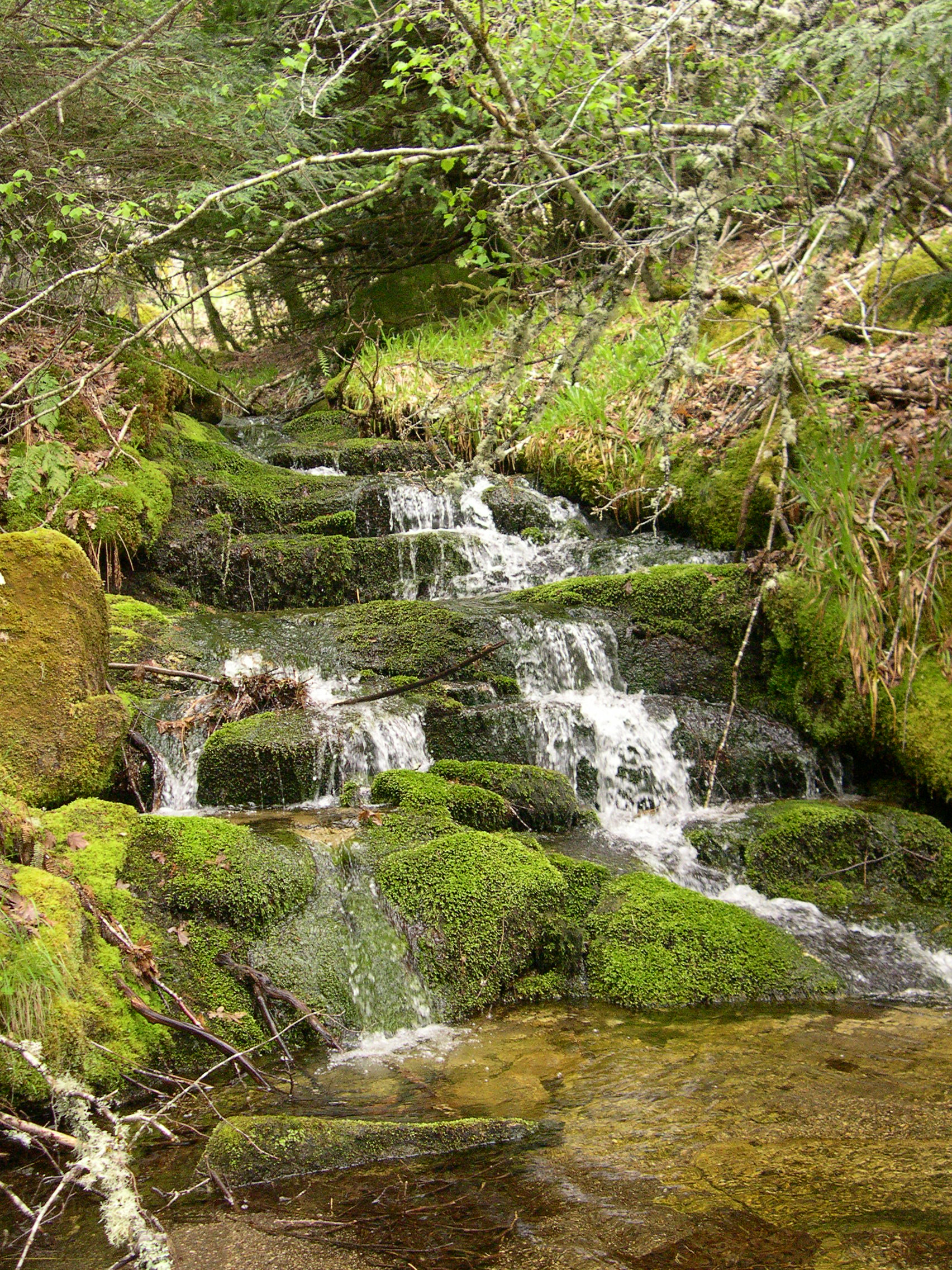

- Flag Coat of arms
- Interactive map of Requejo
- Country: Spain
- Autonomous community: Castile and León
- Province: Zamora
- Municipality: Requejo

Area
  - Total: 46 km^{2} (18 sq mi)

Population (2025-01-01)
  - Total: 107
  - Density: 2.3/km^{2} (6.0/sq mi)
- Time zone: UTC+1 (CET)
  - Summer (DST): UTC+2 (CEST)

Requejo is a municipality located in the province of Zamora, Castile and León, Spain.

According to the 2004 census (INE), the municipality has a population of 164 inhabitants.

Named after the family in control at the time The Manrique De Lara Family (According to The Lara Family Crown and Nobility in Medieval Spain by Simon R. Doubleday), whose closer relatives branched out into the Requejo family. The family was a wealthy ally to the area supplying farms and thorough leadership in the early 1600s. The last living member of the lineage able to request countship candidacy is Giselle Estela Requejo Manrique de Lara De Peña.
