= Pueblica de Valverde =

Pueblica de Valverde, Spain
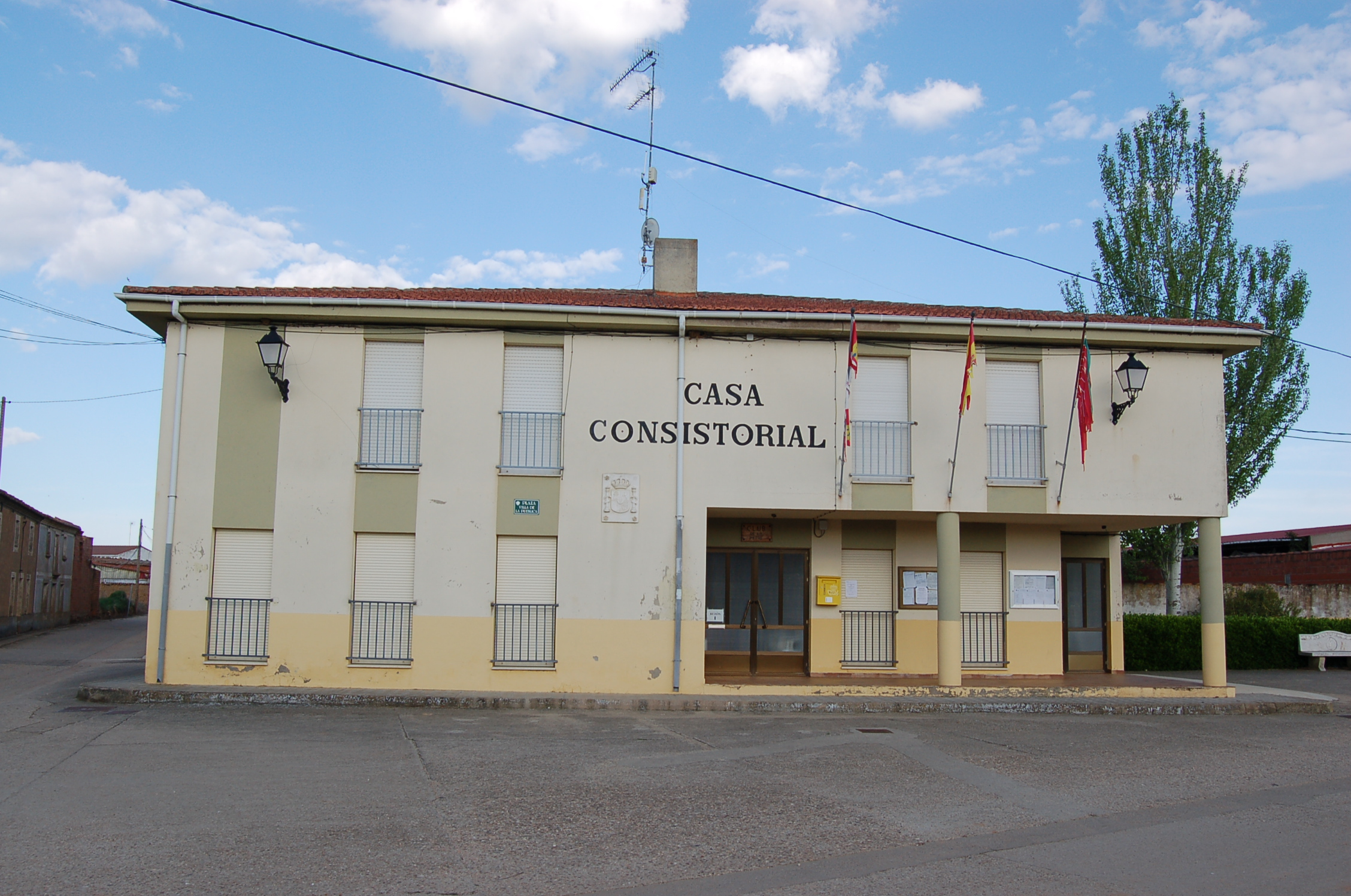

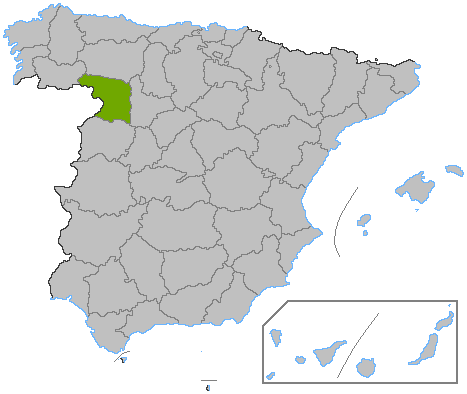

- Location of Pueblica de Valverde in Spain
- Coordinates: 41°55′09″N 5°53′54″W
- Country: Spain
- Autonomous community: Castile and León
- Province: Zamora
- Municipality: Pueblica de Valverde

Area
  - Total: 25 km^{2} (9.7 sq mi)
- Elevation: 734 m (2,408 ft)

Population (2025-01-01)
  - Total: 172
  - Density: 6.9/km^{2} (18/sq mi)
- Time zone: UTC+1 (CET)
  - Summer (DST): UTC+2 (CEST)
- Website: Official website

Pueblica de Valverde is a municipality located in the province of Zamora, Castile and León, Spain. According to the 2004 census (INE), the municipality has a population of 280 inhabitants. Also, Pueblica de Valverde means "town of green"; however, in other (now dead and unspecified) languages it has been rumoured the name means "Place of Floral Beauty".
