= Uña de Quintana =

Municipality in Castile and León, Spain

Coordinates: 42°05′N 6°09′W

- Municipality
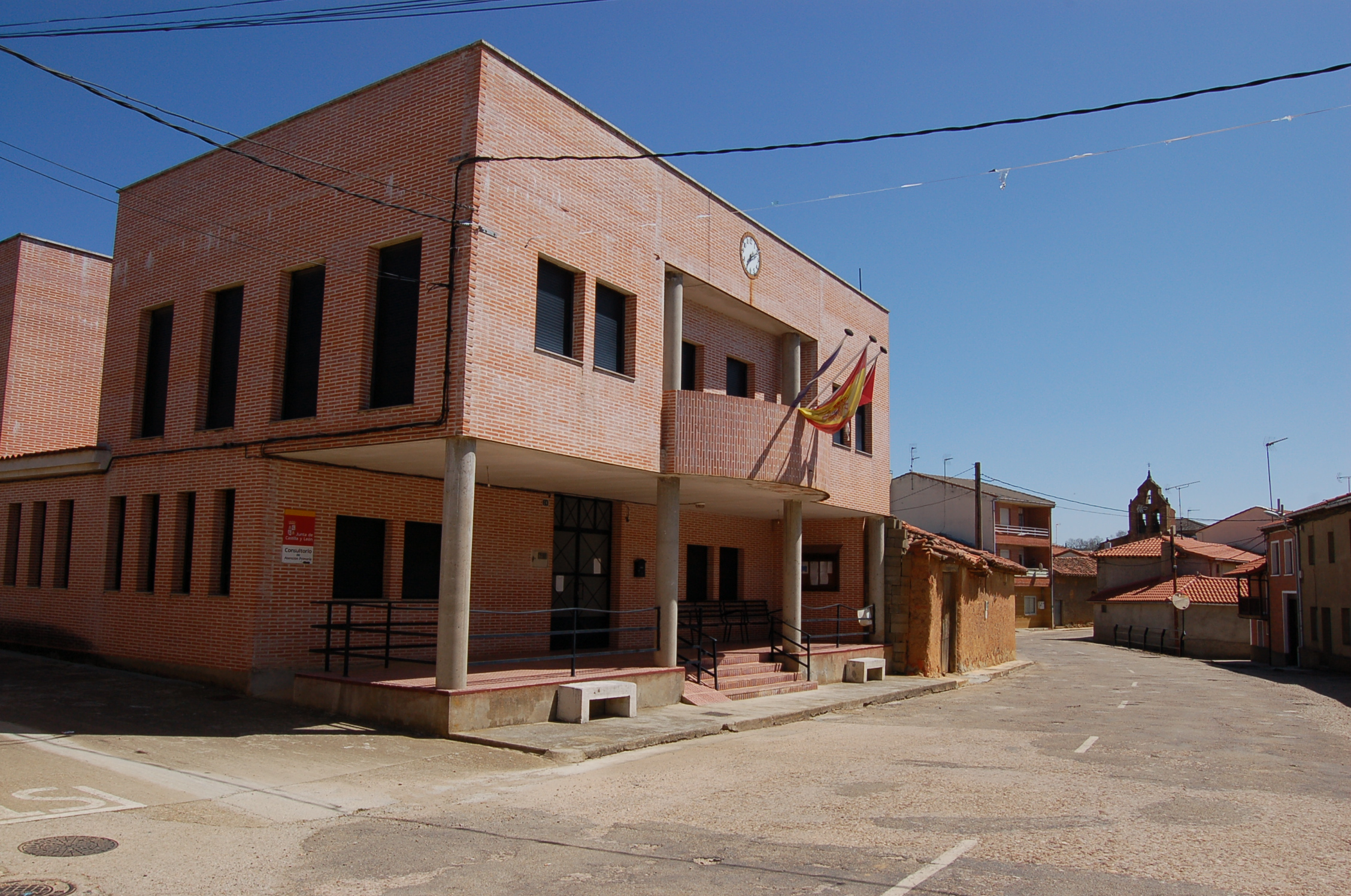
- Interactive map of Uña de Quintana
- Country: Spain
- Autonomous community: Castile and León
- Province: Zamora
- Municipality: Uña de Quintana

Area
  - Total: 29 km^{2} (11 sq mi)

Population (2025-01-01)
  - Total: 119
  - Density: 4.1/km^{2} (11/sq mi)
- Time zone: UTC+1 (CET)
  - Summer (DST): UTC+2 (CEST)
- Website: Official website

Uña de Quintana is a municipality located in the province of Zamora, Castile and León, Spain. According to the 2004 census (INE), the municipality has a population of 219 inhabitants.
