= Villardondiego =

Place in Castile and León, Spain

Coordinates: 41°35′N 5°22′W

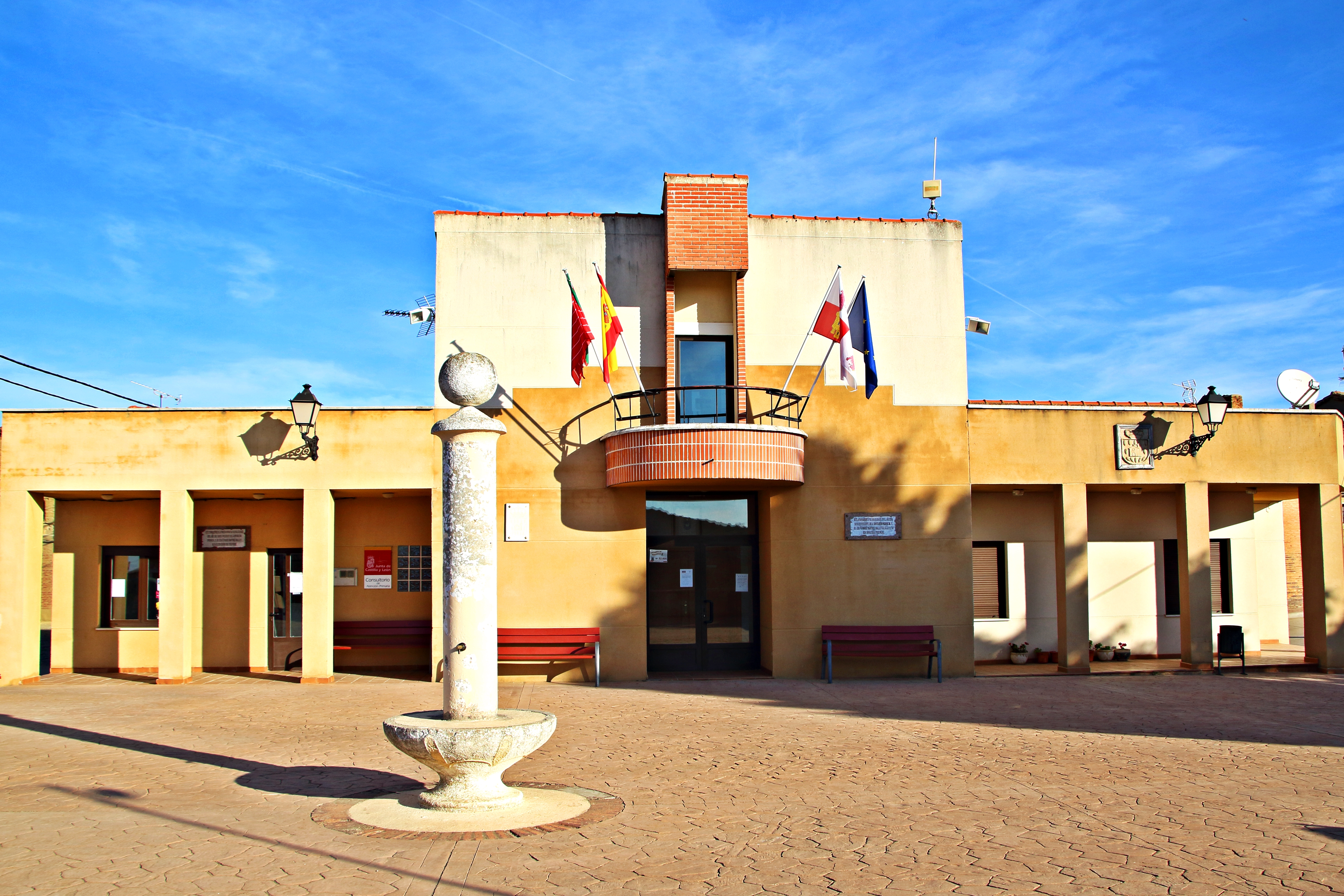
- Villardondiego City Hall

- Flag Coat of arms
- Interactive map of Villardondiego
- Country: Spain
- Autonomous community: Castile and León
- Province: Zamora
- Municipality: Villardondiego

Area
  - Total: 23 km^{2} (8.9 sq mi)

Population (2025-01-01)
  - Total: 110
  - Density: 4.8/km^{2} (12/sq mi)
- Time zone: UTC+1 (CET)
  - Summer (DST): UTC+2 (CEST)

Villardondiego is a municipality located in the province of Zamora, Castile and León, Spain. According to the 2004 census (INE), the municipality has a population of 121 inhabitants.
