= Cazurra =

Coordinates: 41°25′N 5°42′W

Cazurra, Spain
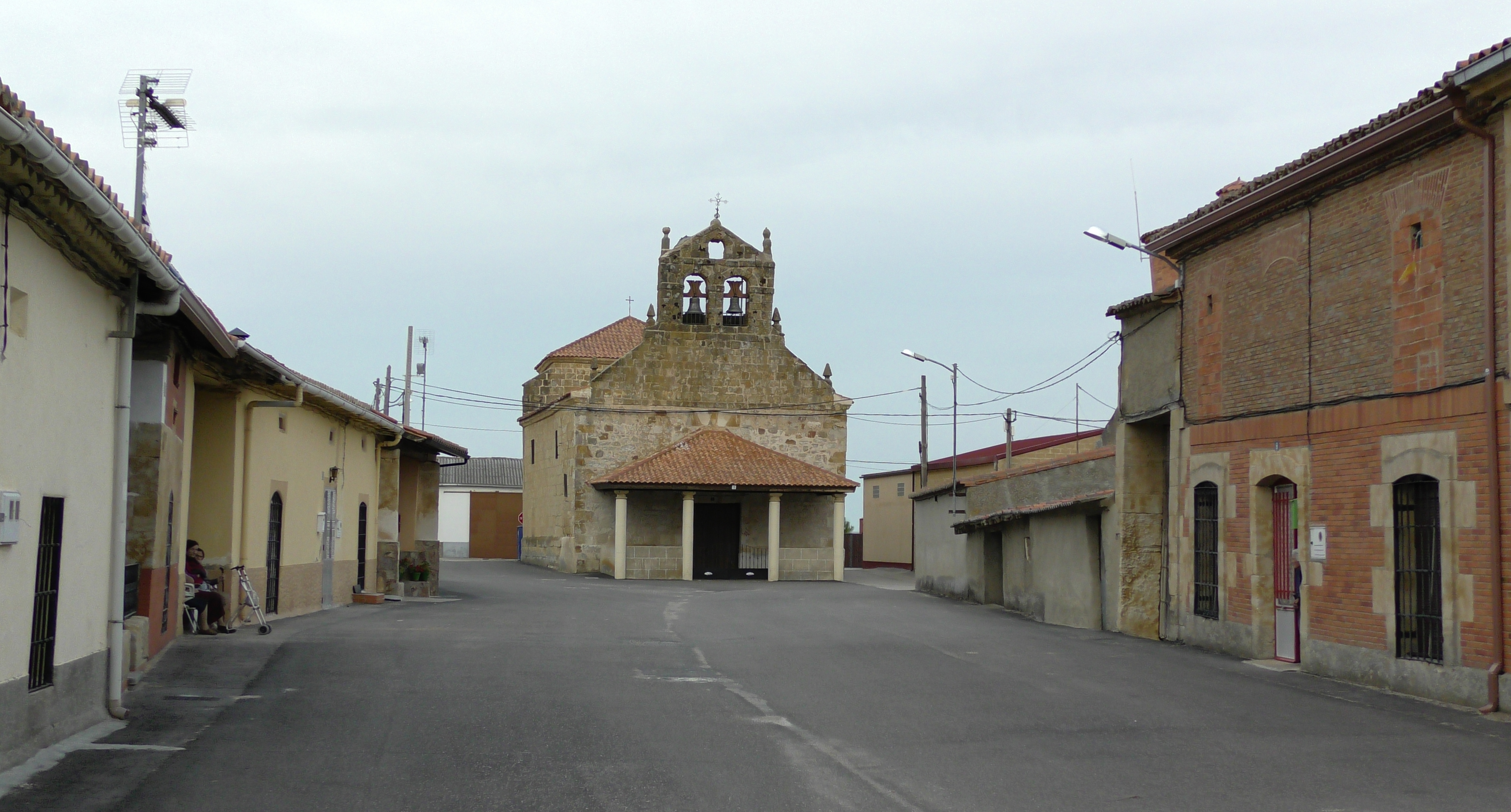
- Interactive map of Cazurra, Spain
- Country: Spain
- Autonomous community: Castile and León
- Province: Zamora
- Municipality: Cazurra

Area
  - Total: 8 km^{2} (3.1 sq mi)

Population (2025-01-01)
  - Total: 72
  - Density: 9.0/km^{2} (23/sq mi)
- Time zone: UTC+1 (CET)
  - Summer (DST): UTC+2 (CEST)

Cazurra is a municipality located in the province of Zamora, Castile and León, Spain. According to the 2009 census (INE), the municipality has a population of 81 inhabitants.
