= Province of Zamora =

Province of Spain

Province of Zamora Provincia de Zamora
- Province
- Coat of arms

- Location of the Province of Zamora in Spain
- Coordinates: 41°45′N 6°00′W
- Country: Spain
- Autonomous community: Castile and León
- Capital: Zamora
- Municipalities: 248 (list)

Government
  - Type: Diputación
  - Body: Provincial Deputation of Zamora
  - President: Fernando Martínez Maillo

Area
  - Total: 10,561.21 km^{2} (4,077.71 sq mi)
  - Rank: 22nd in Spain
- 2.1% of Spain
- Highest elevation (Peña Trevinca): 2,127 m (6,978 ft)

Population (2025)
  - Total: 165,564
  - Rank: 45th in Spain
  - Density: 15.6766/km^{2} (40.6022/sq mi)
- 0.34% of Spain
- Demonym: Zamorano/a
- Website: Official website

The Province of Zamora (Spanish: Provincia de Zamora, Spanish pronunciation: [θaˈmoɾa]) is a province of western Spain, in the western part of the autonomous community of Castile and León. It is bordered by the provinces of Ourense, León, Valladolid, and Salamanca, and by Portugal.

The province has a population of 165,564 in an area of 10,561.21 square kilometres (4,077.71 sq mi) across its 248 municipalities. Nearly a third live in the capital, Zamora.

The present-day province of Zamora was one of three provinces formed from the former Kingdom of León in 1833, when Spain was reorganized into 49 provinces.

== History ==
A megalithic culture developed in this region of Spain, particularly around Aliste, and there are many remaining signs of the presence of various cultures over the years. Salt mining took place at Villafáfila, stone forts were built on fertile plains and near rivers, and others were built in the vicinity of mines where variscite and iron ore were extracted. Rock paintings have been discovered and artefacts found include everyday pottery, tools, and gold and silver jewellery. In the Iron Age, Celtic tribes built forts surrounded by moats but they were pastoral people, living in small villages, and did not build cities. They left standing stones and dolmens.

The Romans first came to Spain in 218 BC, and over the next three centuries there were various conflicts as the Romans advanced into Celtic lands. The Romans built roads across the territory and in 1978 the Roman town of Requejo in Santa Cristina de la Polvorosa was revealed after erosion occurred following flooding of the area by the River Órbigo. In 197 BC, Spain was divided into two provinces, Hispania Citerior and Hispania Ulterior, controlled by two separate Roman military forces. Zamora was in the latter region. Peace reigned until 155 BC when the Lusitanians attacked Hispania Ulterior. Two Roman defeats followed, and many other rebellions were sparked in the peninsula. The Romans eventually prevailed, and in 27 BC, subdivided the province of Hispania Ulterior into Hispania Baetica (modern-day Andalusia) and Lusitania, which included Zamora. When the Vandals invaded the province in the 5th century AD, the Roman Emperor Honorius sent his brother-in-law, the Visigoths' king, to defeat the Vandals. The Visigoths seized control of most of Hispania and made Toledo the capital, while the Suevi occupied the northwestern part of the Peninsula and made their capital city Bracara. By 585 the Suevi had been conquered by the Visigoths who then controlled the whole peninsula.

== Geography ==
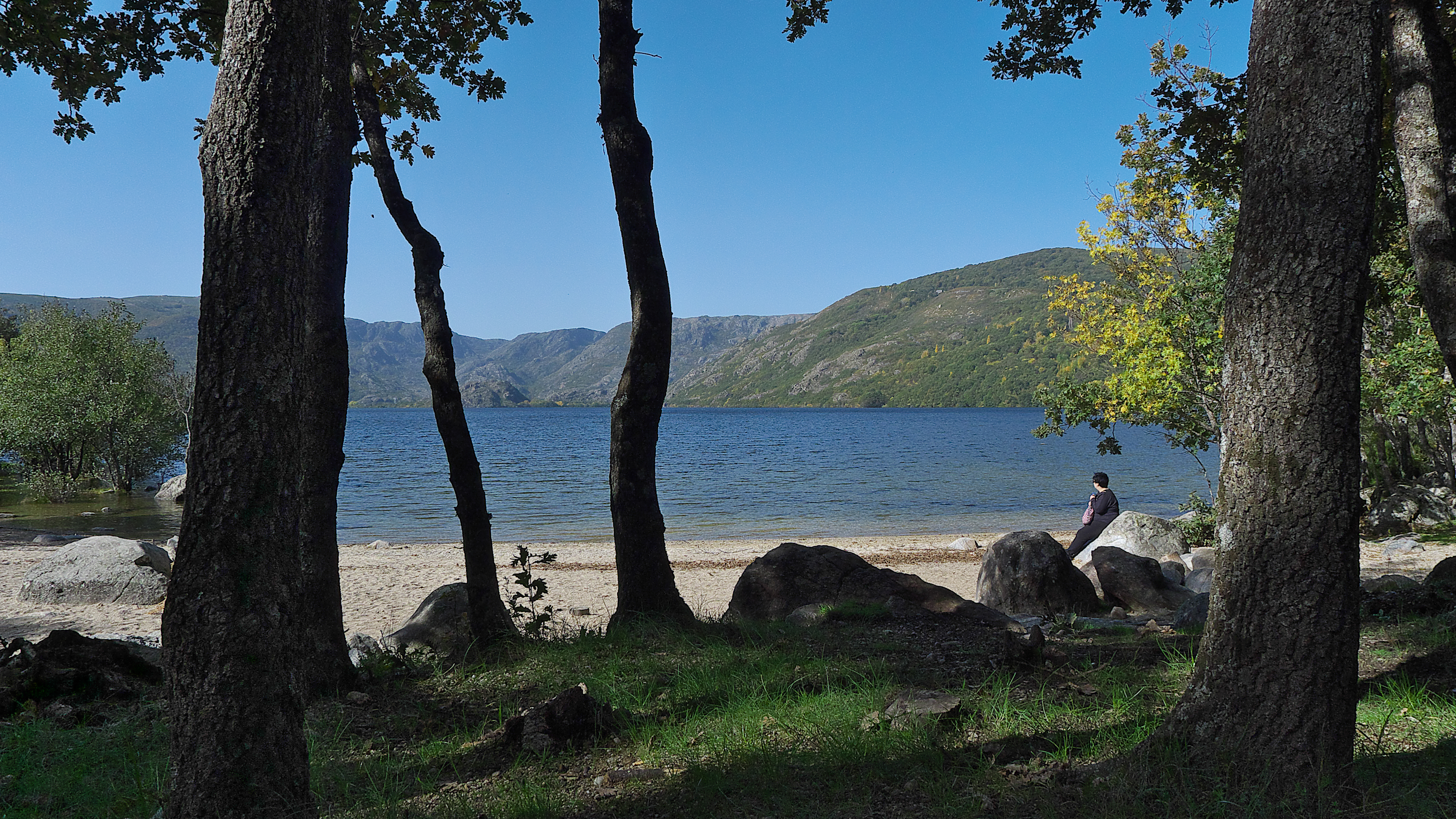
The Sanabria Lake

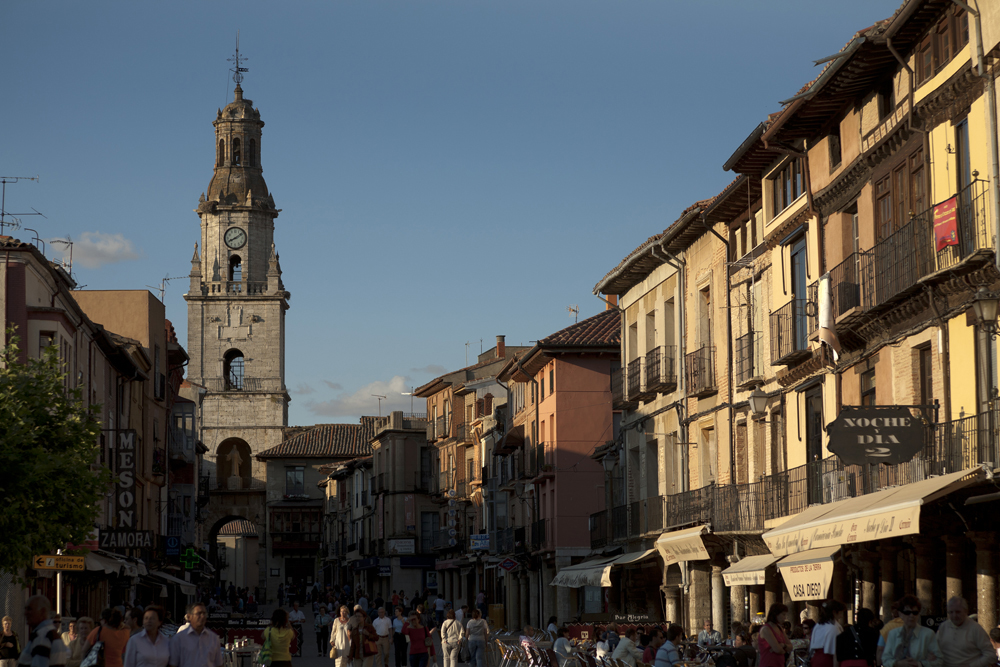
Toro old city

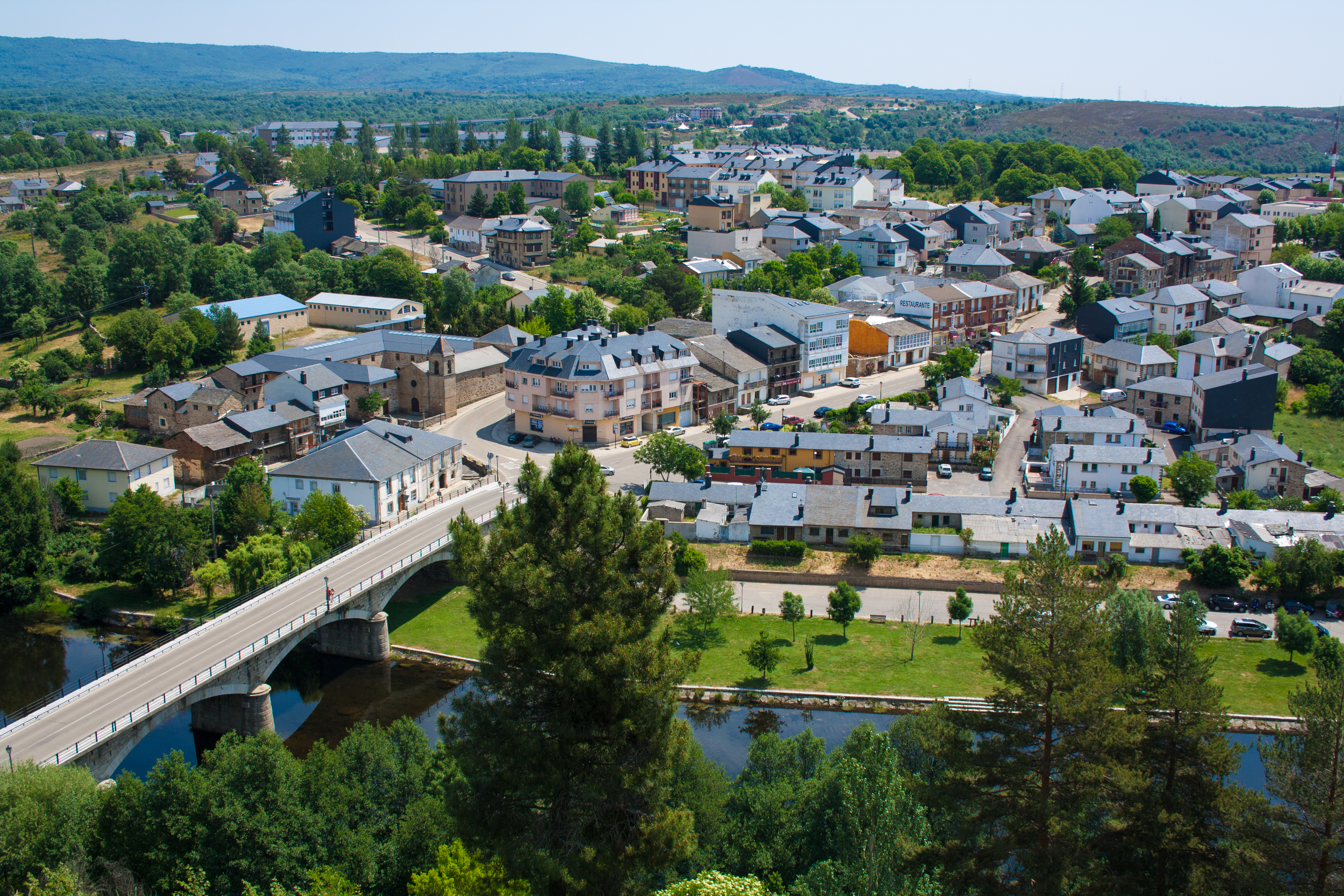
Puebla de Sanabria

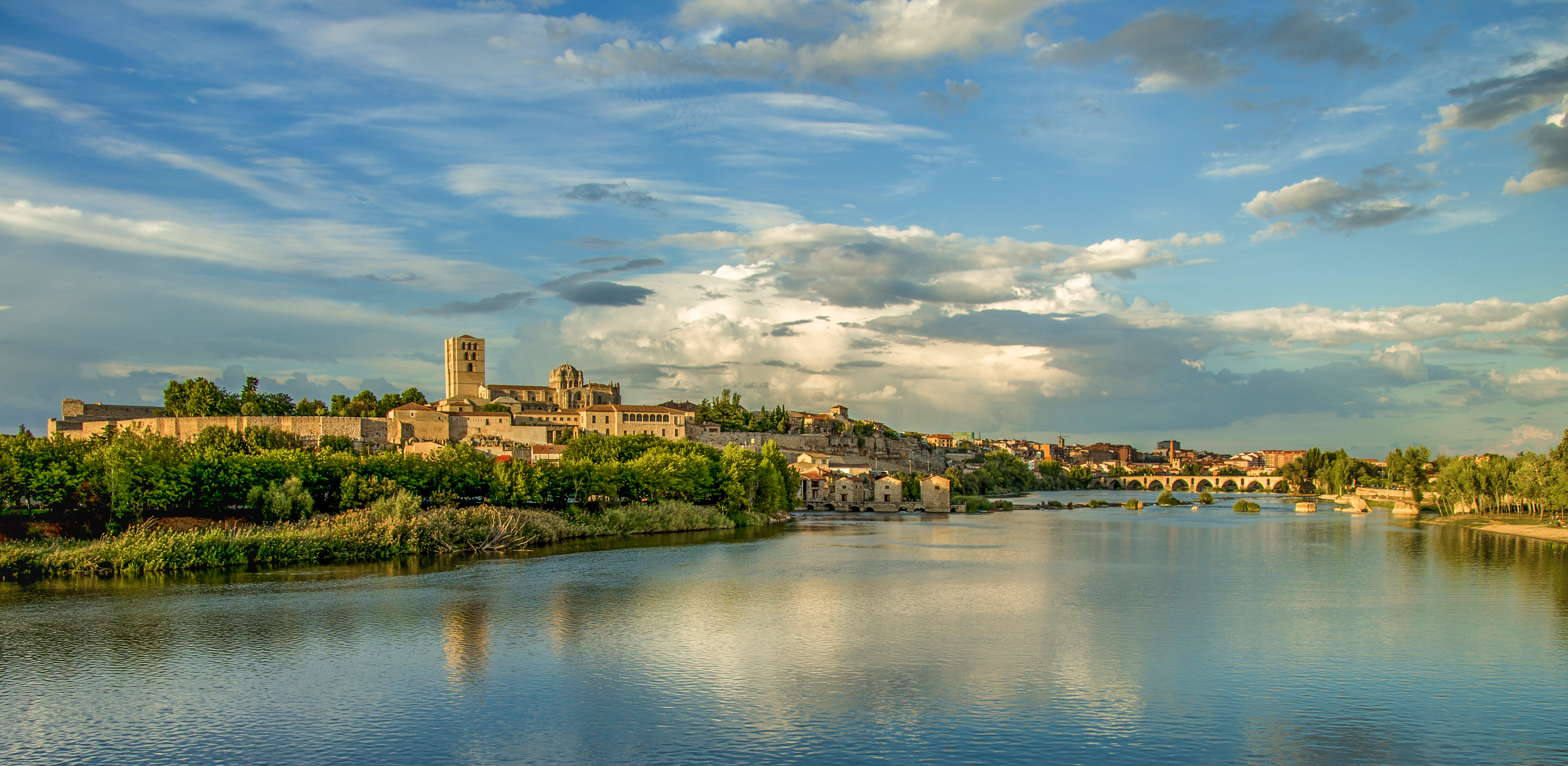
River Duero and old city of Zamora

The Province of Zamora is in northwestern Spain where it borders on Portugal, which lies to the southwest. To the west lies the province of Ourense, to the north lies León, to the east lies Valladolid, and to the south lies Salamanca. The River Esla rises in the Cantabrian Mountains in the north and flows southwards through the province before joining the River Douro (Spanish: el Duero) which then forms part of the boundary with Portugal. The Esla is the largest tributary of the Duero and where they join, discharges a greater quantity of water than that discharged by the Duero. The capital of the province is Zamora which is situated in the south of the province on the banks of the Duero.

The province has a total area of 10,620 square kilometres (4,100 mi^{2}). Its economy is largely agricultural and it has a tradition of sheep rearing, producing a large proportion of Spain's merino wool.

Standing at 2,127 metres above see level, Peña Trevinca, coterminous with Galicia, is the province's highest peak.

=== Municipalities ===
The province has 248 municipalities:

- Abezames
- Alcañices
- Alcubilla de Nogales
- Alfaraz de Sayago
- Algodre
- Almaraz de Duero
- Almeida de Sayago
- Andavías
- Arcenillas
- Arcos de la Polvorosa
- Argañín
- Argujillo
- Arquillinos
- Arrabalde
- Aspariegos
- Asturianos
- Ayoó de Vidriales
- Barcial del Barco
- Belver de los Montes
- Benavente
- Benegiles
- Bermillo de Sayago
- Bretó
- Bretocino
- Brime de Sog
- Brime de Urz
- Burganes de Valverde
- Bustillo del Oro
- Cabañas de Sayago
- Calzadilla de Tera
- Camarzana de Tera
- Cañizal
- Cañizo
- Carbajales de Alba
- Carbellino
- Casaseca de Campeán
- Casaseca de las Chanas
- Castrillo de la Guareña
- Castrogonzalo
- Castronuevo
- Castroverde de Campos
- Cazurra
- Cerecinos de Campos
- Cerecinos del Carrizal
- Cernadilla
- Cobreros
- Coomonte
- Coreses
- Corrales del Vino
- Cotanes del Monte
- Cubillos
- Cubo de Benavente
- Cuelgamures
- El Cubo de Tierra del Vino
- El Maderal
- El Pego
- El Perdigón
- El Piñero
- Entrala
- Espadañedo
- Faramontanos de Tábara
- Fariza
- Fermoselle
- Ferreras de Abajo
- Ferreras de Arriba
- Ferreruela
- Figueruela de Arriba
- Fonfría
- Fresno de la Polvorosa
- Fresno de la Ribera
- Fresno de Sayago
- Friera de Valverde
- Fuente Encalada
- Fuentelapeña
- Fuentes de Ropel
- Fuentesaúco
- Fuentesecas
- Fuentespreadas
- Galende
- Gallegos del Pan
- Gallegos del Río
- Gamones
- Gema
- Granja de Moreruela
- Granucillo
- Guarrate
- Hermisende
- Jambrina
- Justel
- La Bóveda de Toro
- La Hiniesta
- La Torre del Valle
- Losacino
- Losacio
- Lubián
- Luelmo
- Madridanos
- Mahide
- Maire de Castroponce
- Malva
- Manganeses de la Lampreana
- Manganeses de la Polvorosa
- Manzanal de Arriba
- Manzanal de los Infantes
- Manzanal del Barco
- Matilla de Arzón
- Matilla la Seca
- Mayalde
- Melgar de Tera
- Micereces de Tera
- Milles de la Polvorosa
- Molacillos
- Molezuelas de la Carballeda
- Mombuey
- Monfarracinos
- Montamarta
- Moral de Sayago
- Moraleja de Sayago
- Moraleja del Vino
- Morales de Toro
- Morales de Valverde
- Morales del Rey
- Morales del Vino
- Moralina
- Moreruela de los Infanzones
- Moreruela de Tábara
- Muelas de los Caballeros
- Muelas del Pan
- Muga de Sayago
- Navianos de Valverde
- Olmillos de Castro
- Otero de Bodas
- Pajares de la Lampreana
- Palacios de Sanabria
- Palacios del Pan
- Pedralba de la Pradería
- Peleagonzalo
- Peleas de Abajo
- Peñausende
- Peque
- Pereruela
- Perilla de Castro
- Pías
- Piedrahita de Castro
- Pinilla de Toro
- Pino del Oro
- Pobladura de Valderaduey
- Pobladura del Valle
- Porto de Sanabria
- Pozoantiguo
- Pozuelo de Tábara
- Prado
- Puebla de Sanabria
- Pueblica de Valverde
- Quintanilla de Urz
- Quintanilla del Monte
- Quintanilla del Olmo
- Quiruelas de Vidriales
- Rabanales
- Rábano de Aliste
- Requejo
- Revellinos
- Riofrío de Aliste
- Rionegro del Puente
- Roales del Pan
- Robleda-Cervantes
- Roelos de Sayago
- Rosinos de la Requejada
- Salce
- Samir de los Caños
- San Agustín del Pozo
- San Cebrián de Castro
- San Cristóbal de Entreviñas
- San Esteban del Molar
- San Justo
- San Martín de Valderaduey
- San Miguel de la Ribera
- San Miguel del Valle
- San Pedro de Ceque
- San Pedro de la Nave-Almendra
- San Vicente de la Cabeza
- San Vitero
- Santa Clara de Avedillo
- Santa Colomba de las Monjas
- Santa Cristina de la Polvorosa
- Santa Croya de Tera
- Santa Eufemia del Barco
- Santa María de la Vega
- Santa María de Valverde
- Santibáñez de Tera
- Santibáñez de Vidriales
- Santovenia
- Sanzoles
- Tábara
- Tapioles
- Toro
- Torregamones
- Torres del Carrizal
- Trabazos
- Trefacio
- Uña de Quintana
- Vadillo de la Guareña
- Valcabado
- Valdefinjas
- Valdescorriel
- Vallesa de la Guareña
- Vega de Tera
- Vega de Villalobos
- Vegalatrave
- Venialbo
- Vezdemarbán
- Vidayanes
- Videmala
- Villabrázaro
- Villabuena del Puente
- Villadepera
- Villaescusa
- Villafáfila
- Villaferrueña
- Villageriz
- Villalazán
- Villalba de la Lampreana
- Villalcampo
- Villalobos
- Villalonso
- Villalpando
- Villalube
- Villamayor de Campos
- Villamor de los Escuderos
- Villanázar
- Villanueva de Azoague
- Villanueva de Campeán
- Villanueva de las Peras
- Villanueva del Campo
- Villar de Fallaves
- Villar del Buey
- Villaralbo
- Villardeciervos
- Villardiegua de la Ribera
- Villárdiga
- Villardondiego
- Villarrín de Campos
- Villaseco del Pan
- Villavendimio
- Villaveza de Valverde
- Villaveza del Agua
- Viñas
- Zamora

== Demographics ==
Historical population
Year	Pop.	±%
1842	148,882	—
1857	249,162	+67.4%
1877	252,604	+1.4%
1887	272,681	+7.9%
1900	280,434	+2.8%
1910	289,958	+3.4%
1920	290,877	+0.3%
1930	290,213	−0.2%
1940	302,861	+4.4%
1950	316,493	+4.5%
1960	309,142	−2.3%
1970	258,527	−16.4%
1981	227,771	−11.9%
1991	213,668	−6.2%
2001	199,090	−6.8%
2011	191,613	−3.8%
2021	169,165	−11.7%
Source: INE

As of 2026, the population is 165,564, of which 49.5% are male, and 50.5% are female. Minors make up 11.1% of the population, and seniors make up 32.7%.

The province's population is currently the most declining of all Spanish provinces.

=== Immigration ===
As of 2025, immigrants make up 8.2% of the population. The 5 largest foreign countries of birth are Colombia, Morocco, Portugal, Venezuela, and Cuba.

== Tourism ==
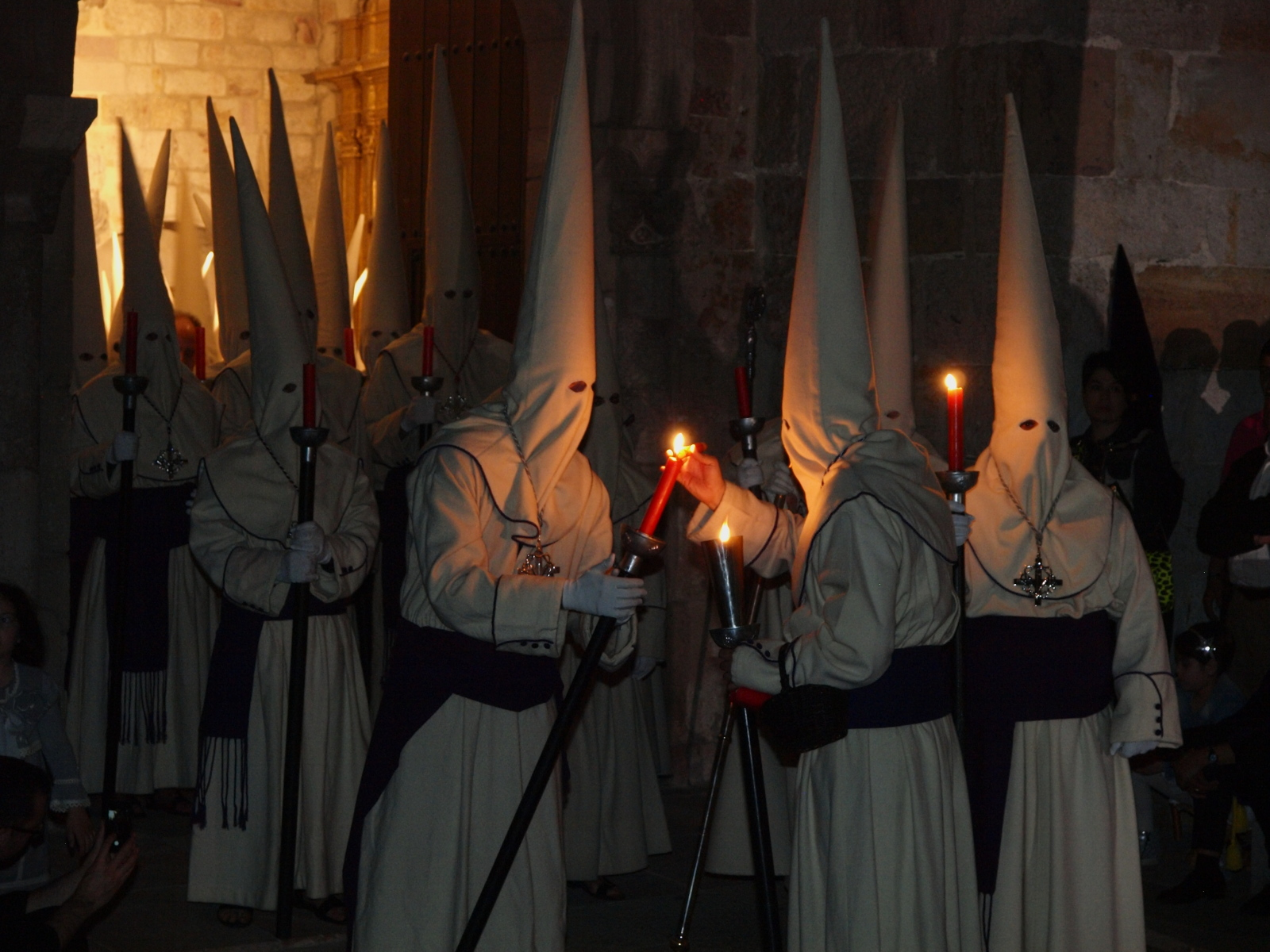
Holy Week in Zamora

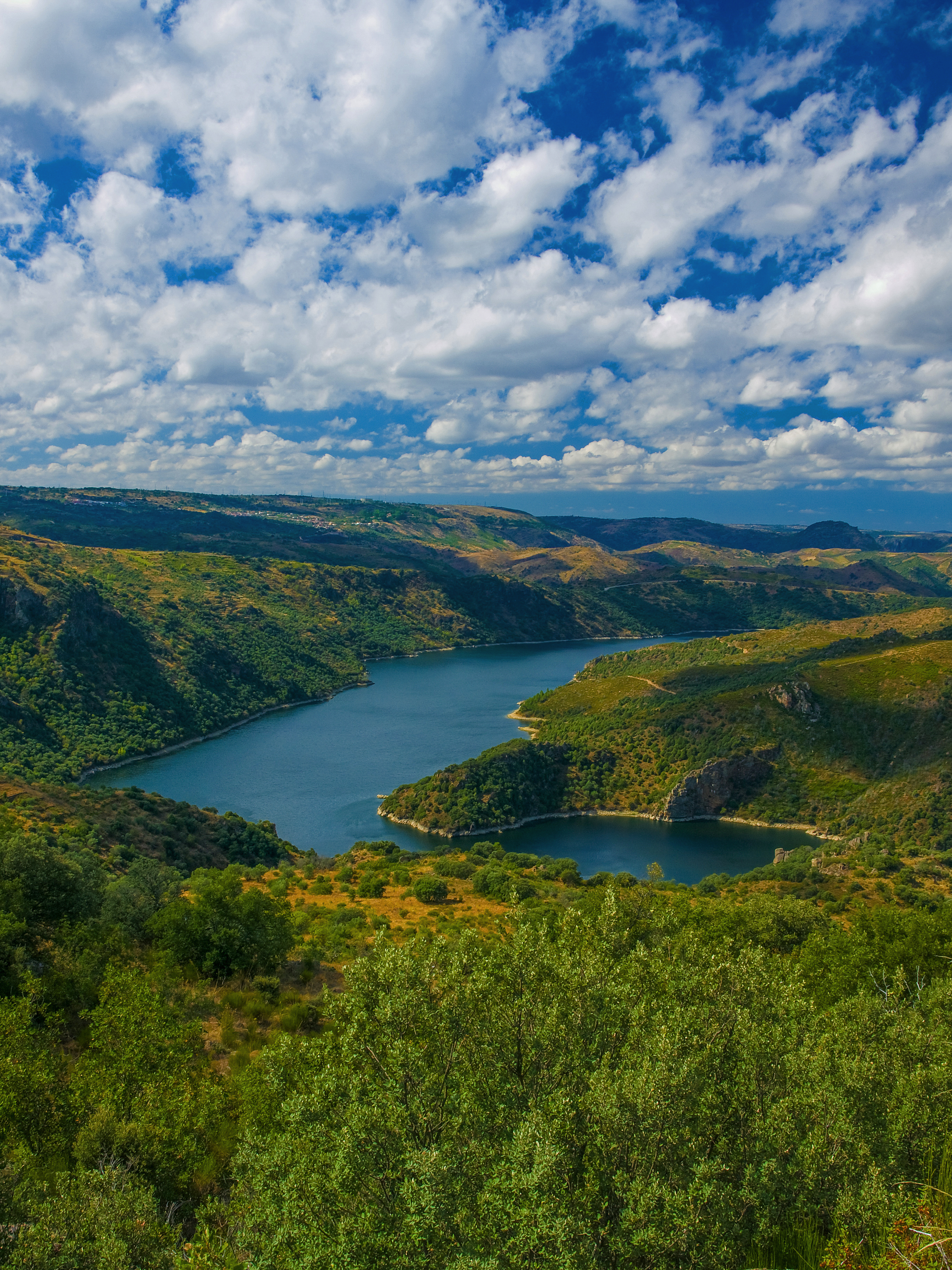
Arribes del Duero Natural Park

Zamora has many fine historic churches and buildings. These include a twelfth century Romanesque cathedral, many other churches, city walls, ancient houses and a castle. Pottery, textiles and wine are manufactured here.

70 km (43 mi) further north lies Benavente. It is famous for its Santa María church and the Castle of La Mota (now the Parador of Benavente). The Parador was the home of Ferdinand II of León who died here while returning from a pilgrimage to Santiago de Compostela. The Parador occupies the Caracol Tower, a sixteenth-century castle, part of the former walled enclosure of the town.

The ancient town of Toro lies beside the Duero 39 km (24 mi) to the east of Zamora. Ferdinand III of Castile was crowned King of León in the town in 1230 and his wife Elisabeth of Swabia (Beatriz) died here. Notable features include the façade of the 'Palacio de las Leyes' and also the Santa María la Mayor collegiate church (known in Spanish as La Colegiata). Legend has it that the wines of Toro were the first to reach America, being taken there by Christopher Columbus.

The region of Sanabria (or Senabria) is in the northwest of the province near the Sanabria Lake, one of the few large natural lakes in Spain, on the border with Galicia. It has been declared a Historic and Artistic centre. The lake is now part of Sanabria Lake Natural Park, having been declared a Natural Park in 1978.

Fermoselle is a medieval village located on the border with Portugal and on the edge of the Arribes del Duero Natural Park. Arribes is the name for the gorges through which the Duero and other rivers in this region flow. The steep slopes have long been terraced for the production of grapes, olives and other fruit.

Near the municipality of Villafáfila are lagoons that now form part of a nature reserve. They were formed by the historic mining of salt which started in the copper age and Bronze Age. Pottery items found here are similar to artefacts found in Mesopotamia, Turkey, Bosnia, Romania and Poland. The lagoons are home to numerous species of birds, and this is the second largest wetland reserve in Spain after Doñana National Park.

== See also ==
- Kingdom of León
