= Abezames =

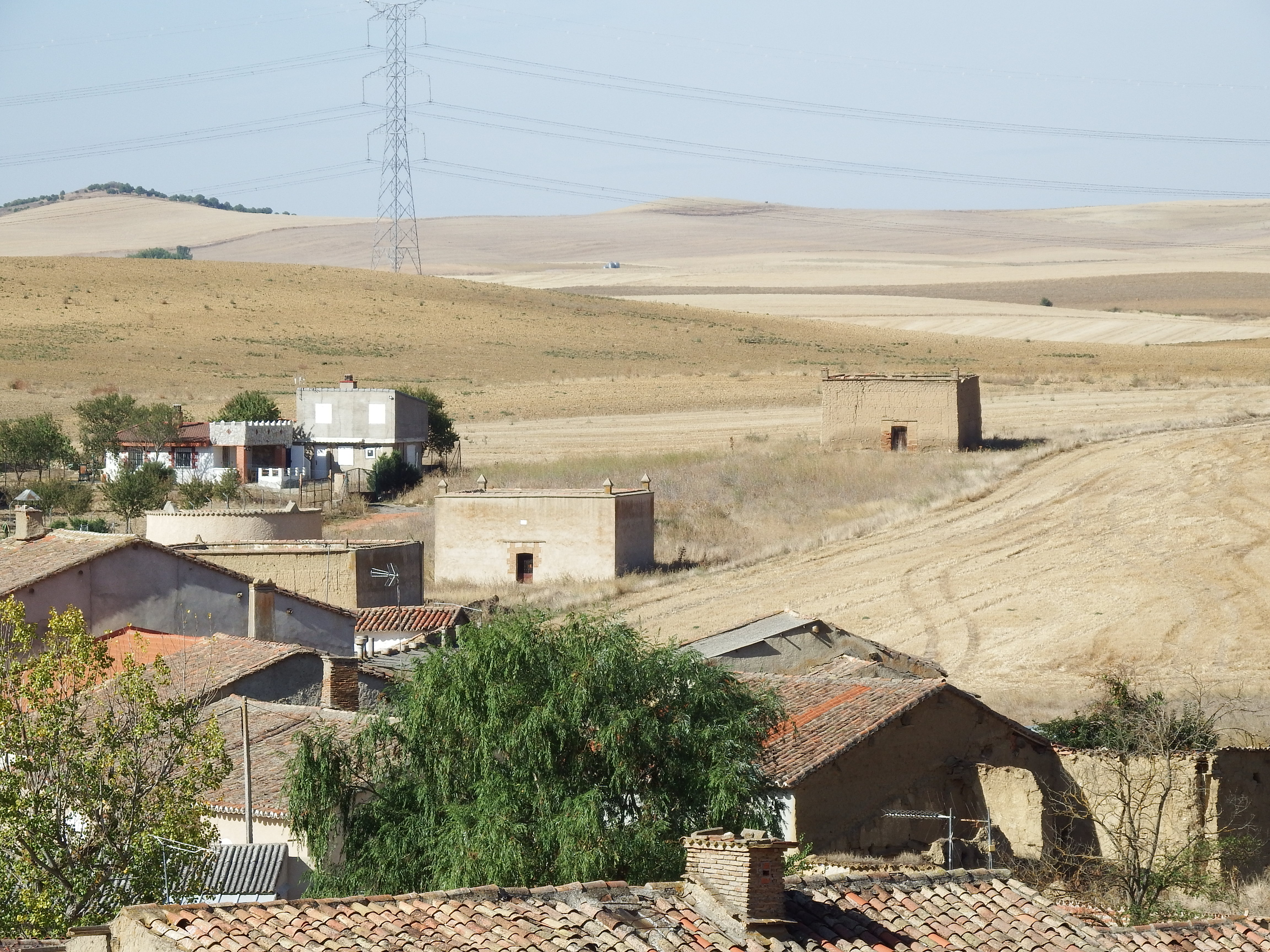

- Flag Coat of arms
- Interactive map of Abezames
- Coordinates: 41°37′33″N 5°25′36″W
- Country: Spain
- Autonomous community: Castile and León
- Province: Zamora
- Municipality: Abezames

Area
  - Total: 23.26 km^{2} (8.98 sq mi)
- Elevation: 741 m (2,431 ft)

Population (2025-01-01)
  - Total: 58
  - Density: 2.5/km^{2} (6.5/sq mi)
- Time zone: UTC+1 (CET)
  - Summer (DST): UTC+2 (CEST)
- Climate: Csb

Abezames is a municipality located in the province of Zamora, Castile and León, Spain. According to the 2004 census (INE), the municipality had a population of 95 inhabitants.
