= Casaseca de las Chanas =

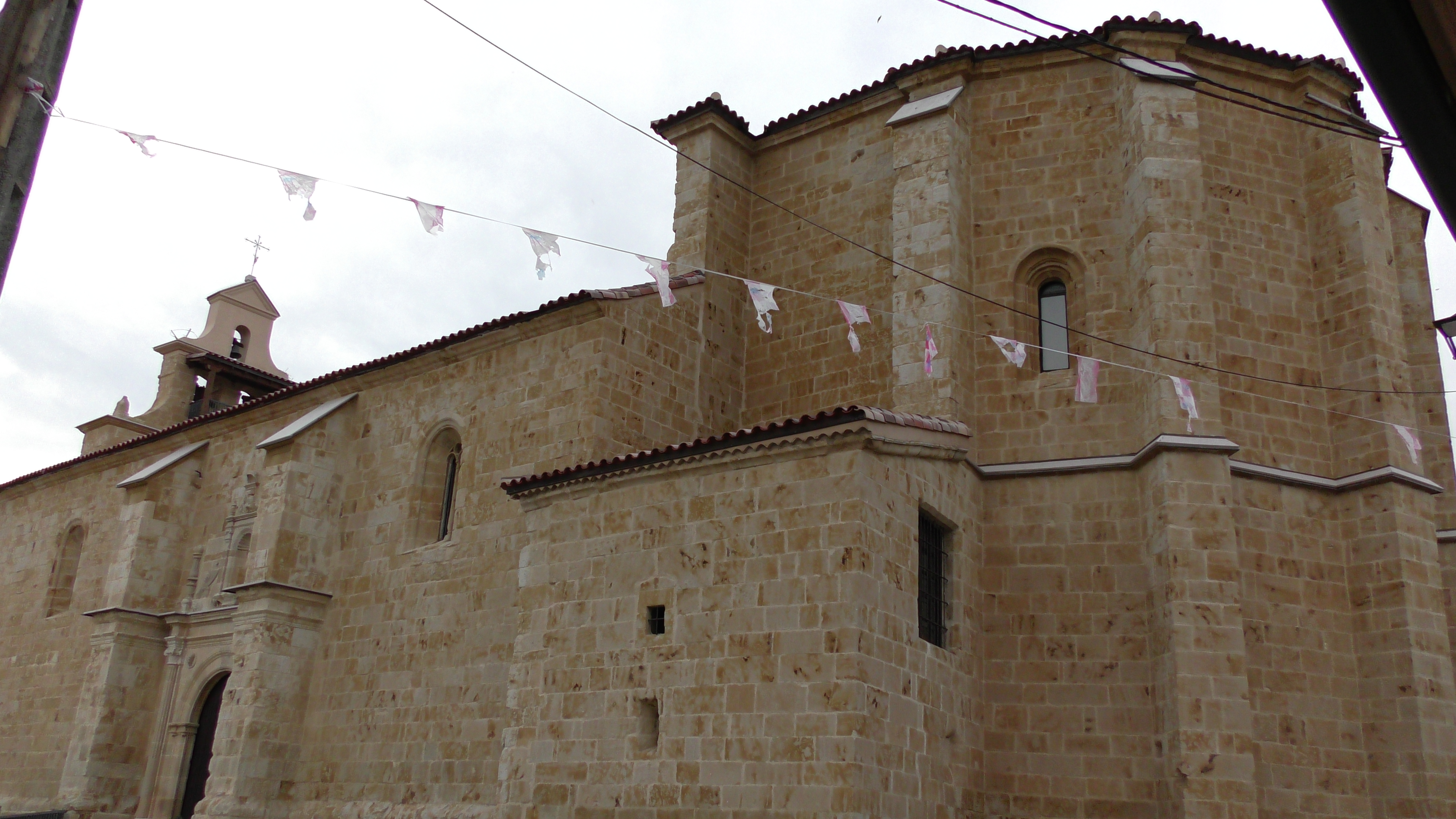

- Flag Coat of arms

- Location in Spain.
- Coordinates: 41°26′22″N 5°40′42″W
- Country: Spain
- Autonomous community: Castile and León
- Province: Zamora

Government
  - Mayor: José María Rodríguez Calzada

Area
  - Total: 12 km^{2} (4.6 sq mi)

Population (2025-01-01)
  - Total: 373
  - Density: 31/km^{2} (81/sq mi)
- Time zone: UTC+1 (CET)
  - Summer (DST): UTC+2 (CEST)

Casaseca de las Chanas is a municipality located in the province of Zamora, Castile and León, Spain. According to the 2009 census (INE), the municipality has a population of 420 inhabitants.
