= Villalube =

Coordinates: 41°37′N 5°32′W

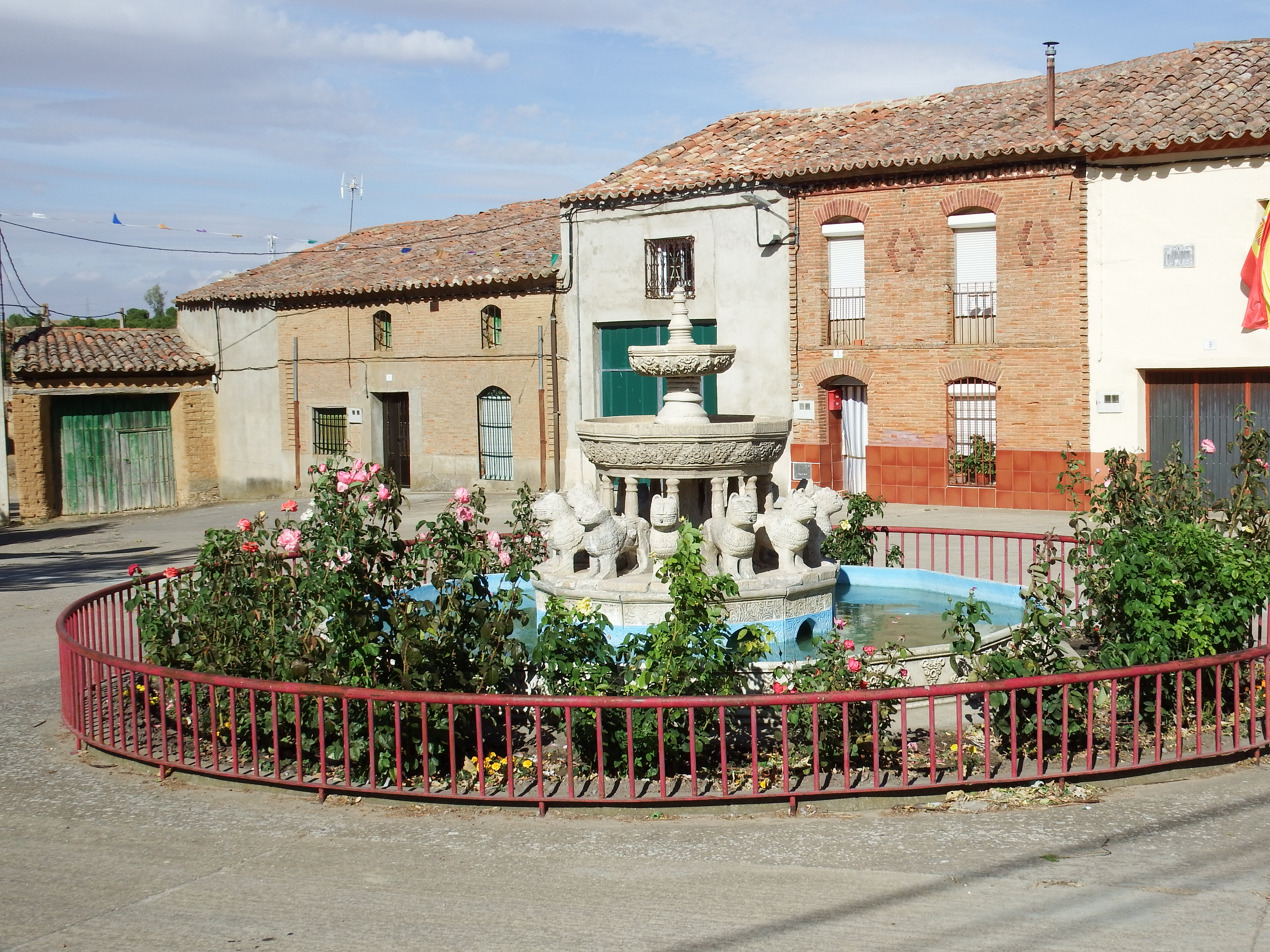

- Flag Coat of arms
- Interactive map of Villalube
- Country: Spain
- Autonomous community: Castile and León
- Province: Zamora
- Municipality: Villalube

Area
  - Total: 39 km^{2} (15 sq mi)

Population (2025-01-01)
  - Total: 143
  - Density: 3.7/km^{2} (9.5/sq mi)
- Time zone: UTC+1 (CET)
  - Summer (DST): UTC+2 (CEST)

Villalube is a municipality located in the province of Zamora, Castile and León, Spain. According to the 2004 census (INE), the municipality has a population of 260 inhabitants.
