= Fresno de la Polvorosa =

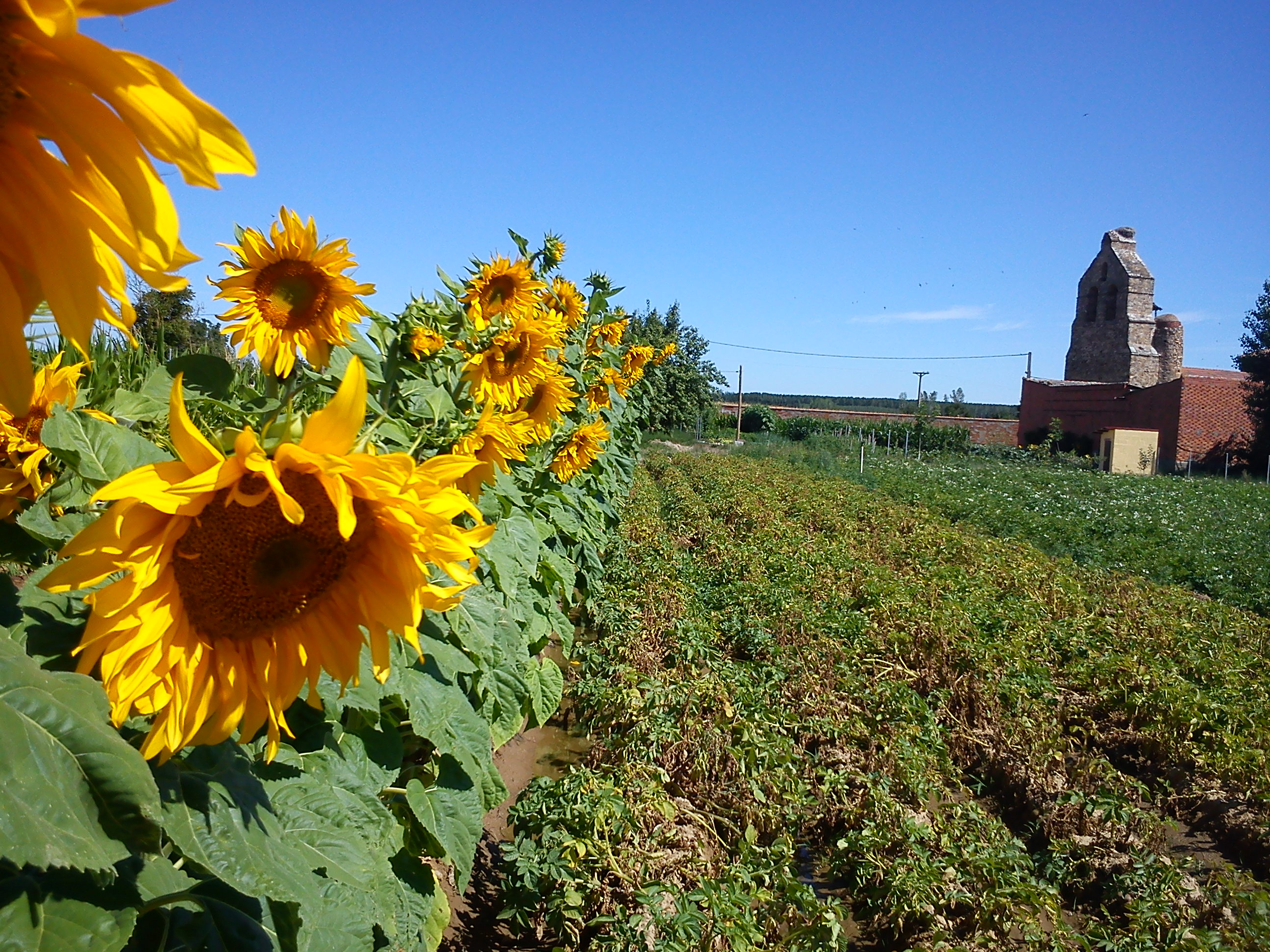

- Flag Coat of arms

- Location in Spain.
- Coordinates: 42°5′01″N 5°46′12″W
- Country: Spain
- Autonomous community: Castile and León
- Province: Zamora
- Comarca: Benavente y Los Valles

Government
  - Mayor: José Ríos Rodríguez

Area
  - Total: 4.11 km^{2} (1.59 sq mi)
- Elevation: 722 m (2,369 ft)

Population (2025-01-01)
  - Total: 117
  - Density: 28.5/km^{2} (73.7/sq mi)
- Time zone: UTC+1 (CET)
  - Summer (DST): UTC+2 (CEST)
- Website: Official webpage

Fresno de la Polvorosa is a municipality located in the province of Zamora, Castile and León, Spain.
