= Matilla la Seca =

Coordinates: 41°35′N 5°30′W

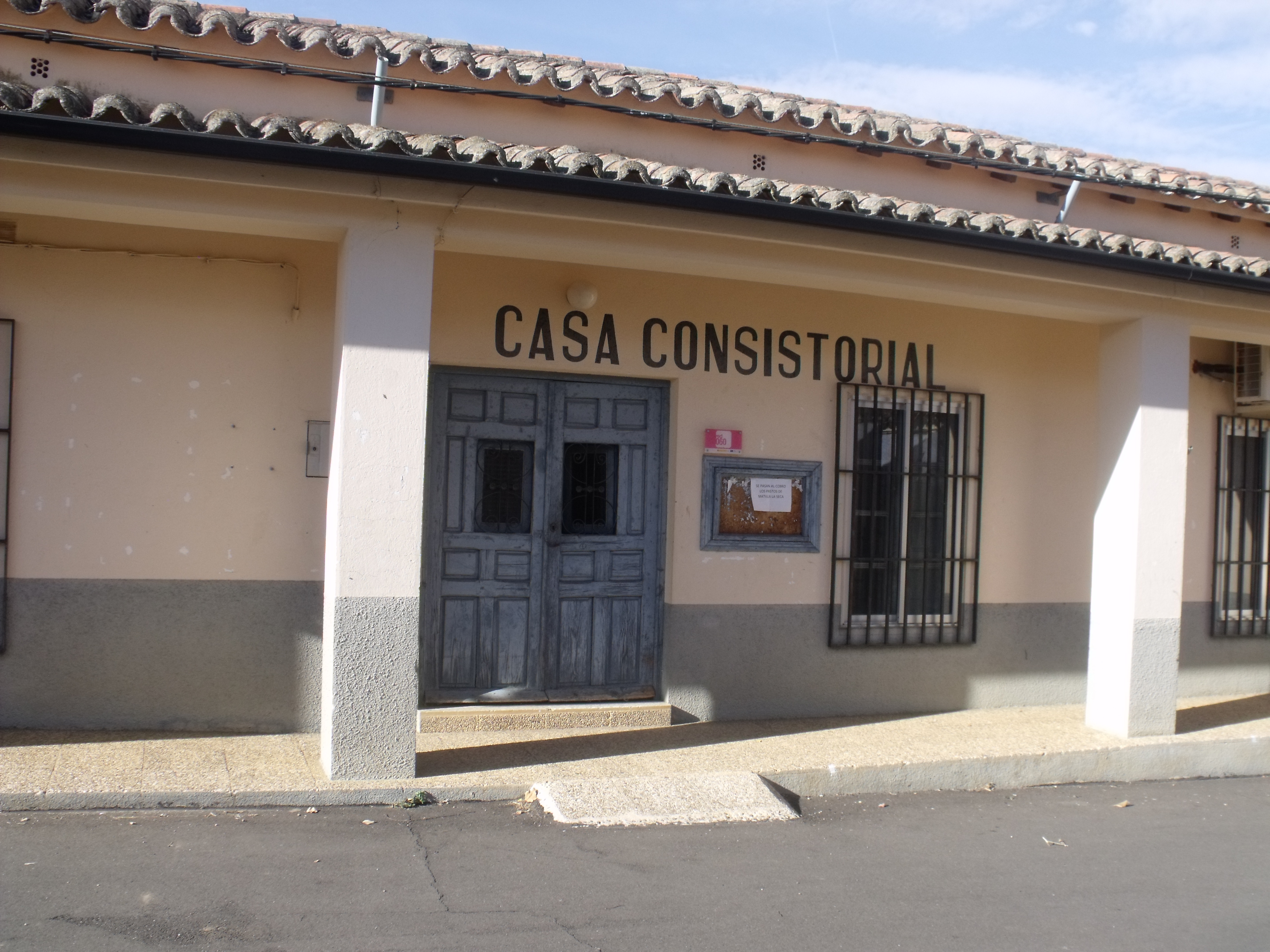
- Town hall
- Interactive map of Matilla la Seca
- Country: Spain
- Autonomous community: Castile and León
- Province: Zamora
- Municipality: Matilla la Seca

Area
  - Total: 12 km^{2} (4.6 sq mi)

Population (2025-01-01)
  - Total: 33
  - Density: 2.8/km^{2} (7.1/sq mi)
- Time zone: UTC+1 (CET)
  - Summer (DST): UTC+2 (CEST)

Matilla la Seca is a small municipality located in the province of Zamora, Castile and León, Spain. According to the 2022 census (INE), the municipality has a population of 36 inhabitants.
