= Jambrina =

Coordinates: 41°24′N 5°40′W

Jambrina, Spain
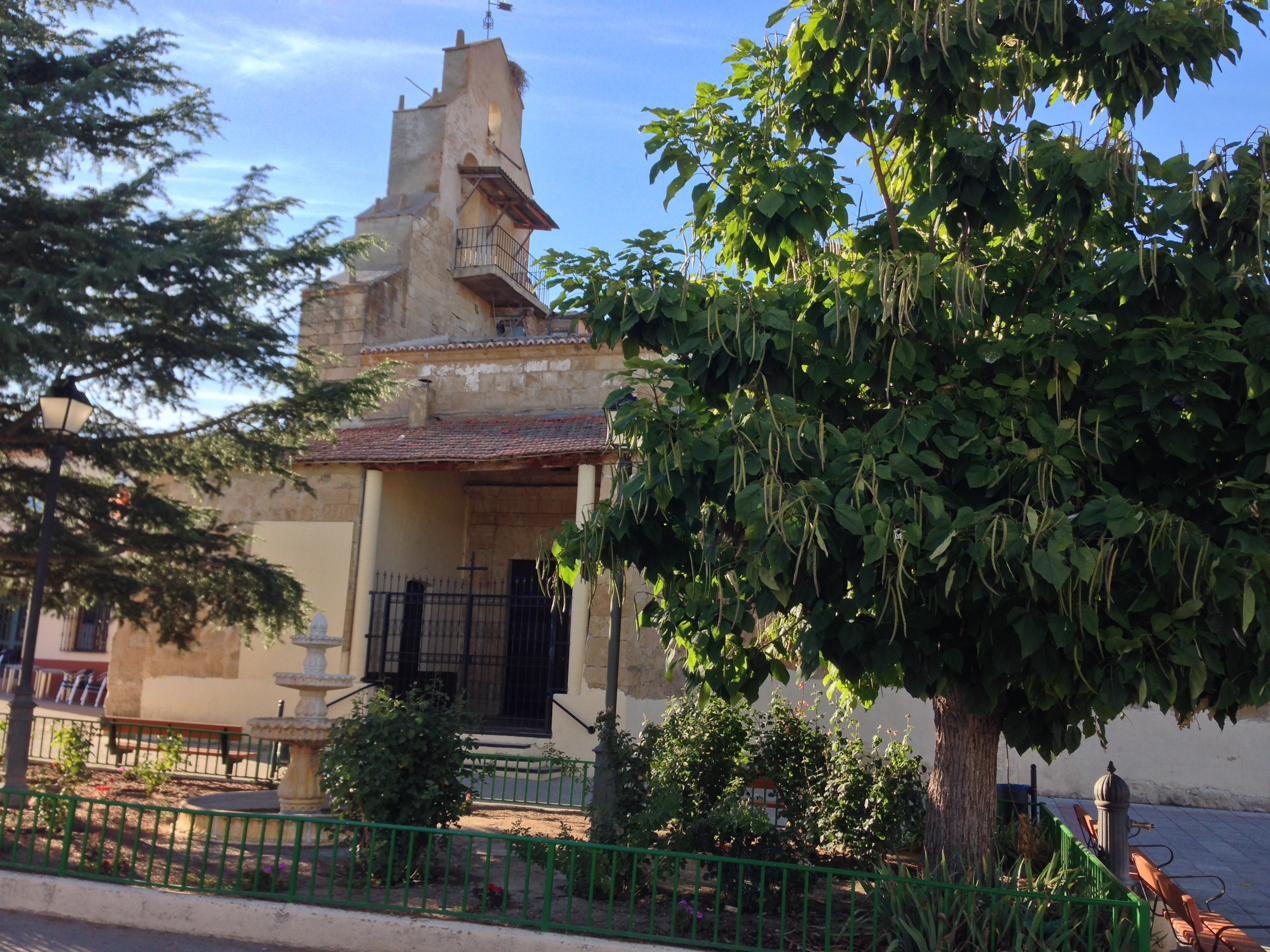

- Flag Coat of arms
- Interactive map of Jambrina, Spain
- Country: Spain
- Autonomous community: Castile and León
- Province: Zamora
- Municipality: Jambrina

Area
  - Total: 16 km^{2} (6.2 sq mi)

Population (2025-01-01)
  - Total: 149
  - Density: 9.3/km^{2} (24/sq mi)
- Time zone: UTC+1 (CET)
  - Summer (DST): UTC+2 (CEST)

Jambrina is a municipality located in the province of Zamora, Castile and León, Spain. According to the 2004 census (INE), the municipality has a population of 221 inhabitants.
