= Navianos de Valverde =

Place in Castile and León, Spain

Coordinates: 41°57′N 5°49′W

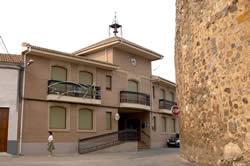
- Navianos de Valverde City Hall

- Flag Coat of arms
- Interactive map of Navianos de Valverde
- Country: Spain
- Autonomous community: Castile and León
- Province: Zamora
- Municipality: Navianos de Valverde

Area
  - Total: 14.12 km^{2} (5.45 sq mi)
- Elevation: 706 m (2,316 ft)

Population (2025-01-01)
  - Total: 157
  - Density: 11.1/km^{2} (28.8/sq mi)
- Time zone: UTC+1 (CET)
  - Summer (DST): UTC+2 (CEST)

Navianos de Valverde is a municipality located in the province of Zamora, Castile and León, Spain. According to the 2004 census (INE), the municipality had a population of 253 inhabitants.
