= Venialbo =

Coordinates: 41°23′N 5°32′W

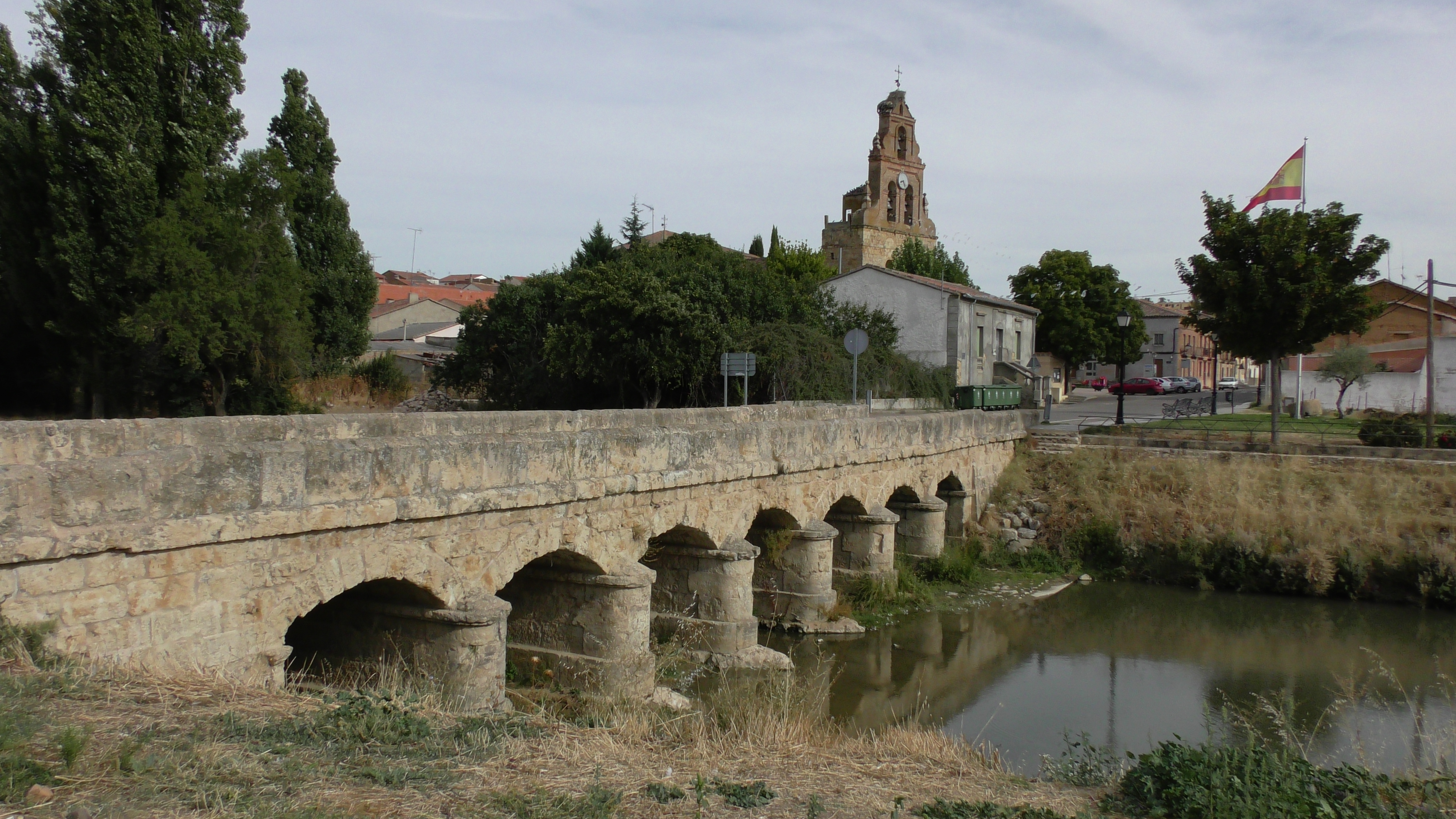
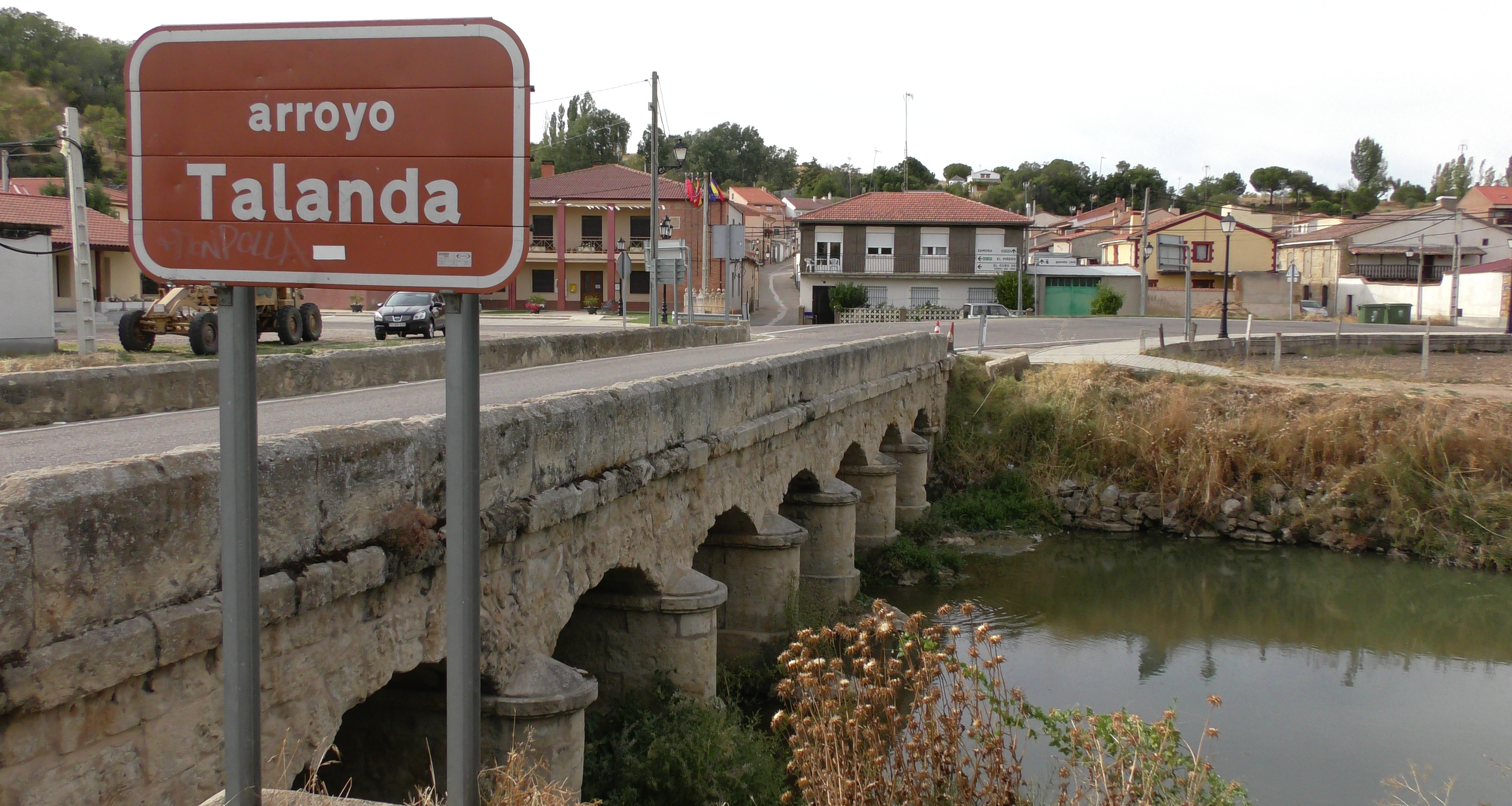
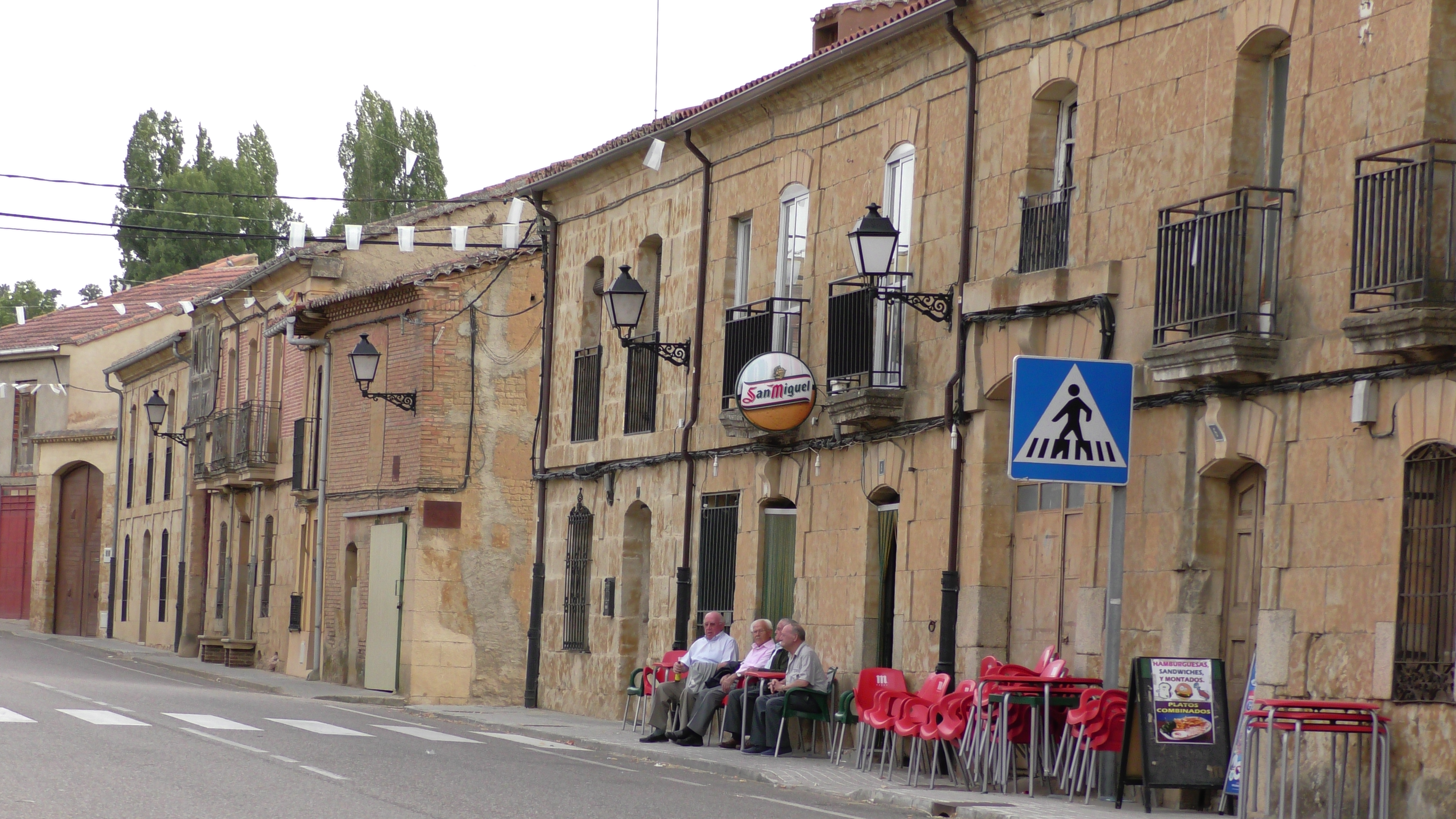
- Top down: Right shore of Talanda creek and surroundings of the highway.

- Flag Coat of arms
- Interactive map of Venialbo
- Country: Spain
- Autonomous community: Castile and León
- Province: Zamora
- Municipality: Venialbo

Area
  - Total: 41 km^{2} (16 sq mi)

Population (2025-01-01)
  - Total: 439
  - Density: 11/km^{2} (28/sq mi)
- Time zone: UTC+1 (CET)
  - Summer (DST): UTC+2 (CEST)
- Website: Official website

Venialbo is a municipality located in the province of Zamora, Castile and León, Spain. According to the 2004 census (INE), the municipality has a population of 502 inhabitants.
