= Brime de Sog =

Coordinates: 42°04′N 6°03′W

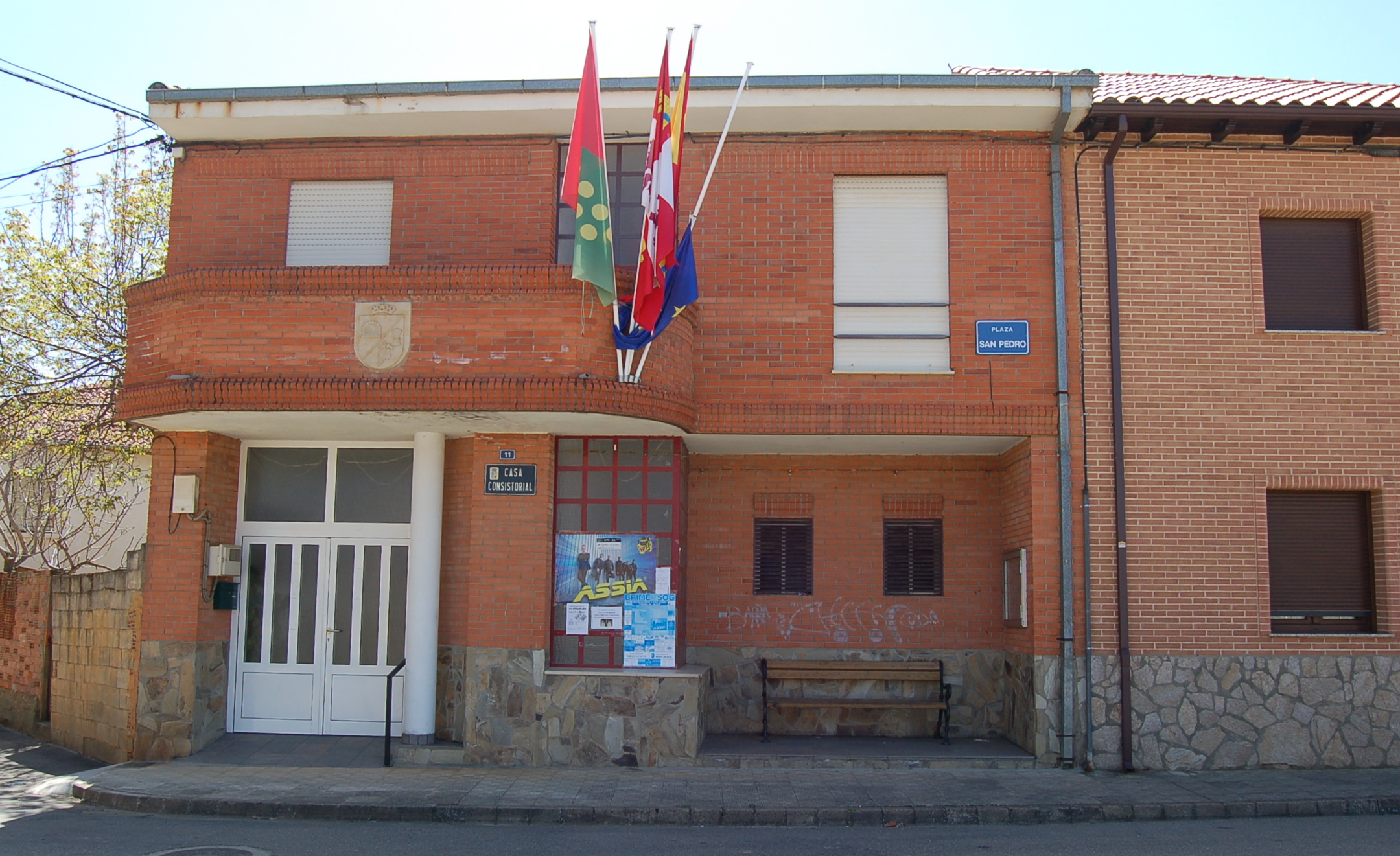
- City Hall

- Flag Coat of arms
- Interactive map of Brime de Sog
- Country: Spain
- Autonomous community: Castile and León
- Province: Zamora
- Municipality: Brime de Sog

Area
  - Total: 17 km^{2} (6.6 sq mi)

Population (2025-01-01)
  - Total: 114
  - Density: 6.7/km^{2} (17/sq mi)
- Time zone: UTC+1 (CET)
  - Summer (DST): UTC+2 (CEST)

Brime de Sog is a municipality located in the province of Zamora, Castile and León, Spain. According to the 2004 census (INE), the municipality has a population of 215 inhabitants.
