= Madridanos =

Place in Castile and León, Spain

Coordinates: 41°29′N 5°36′W

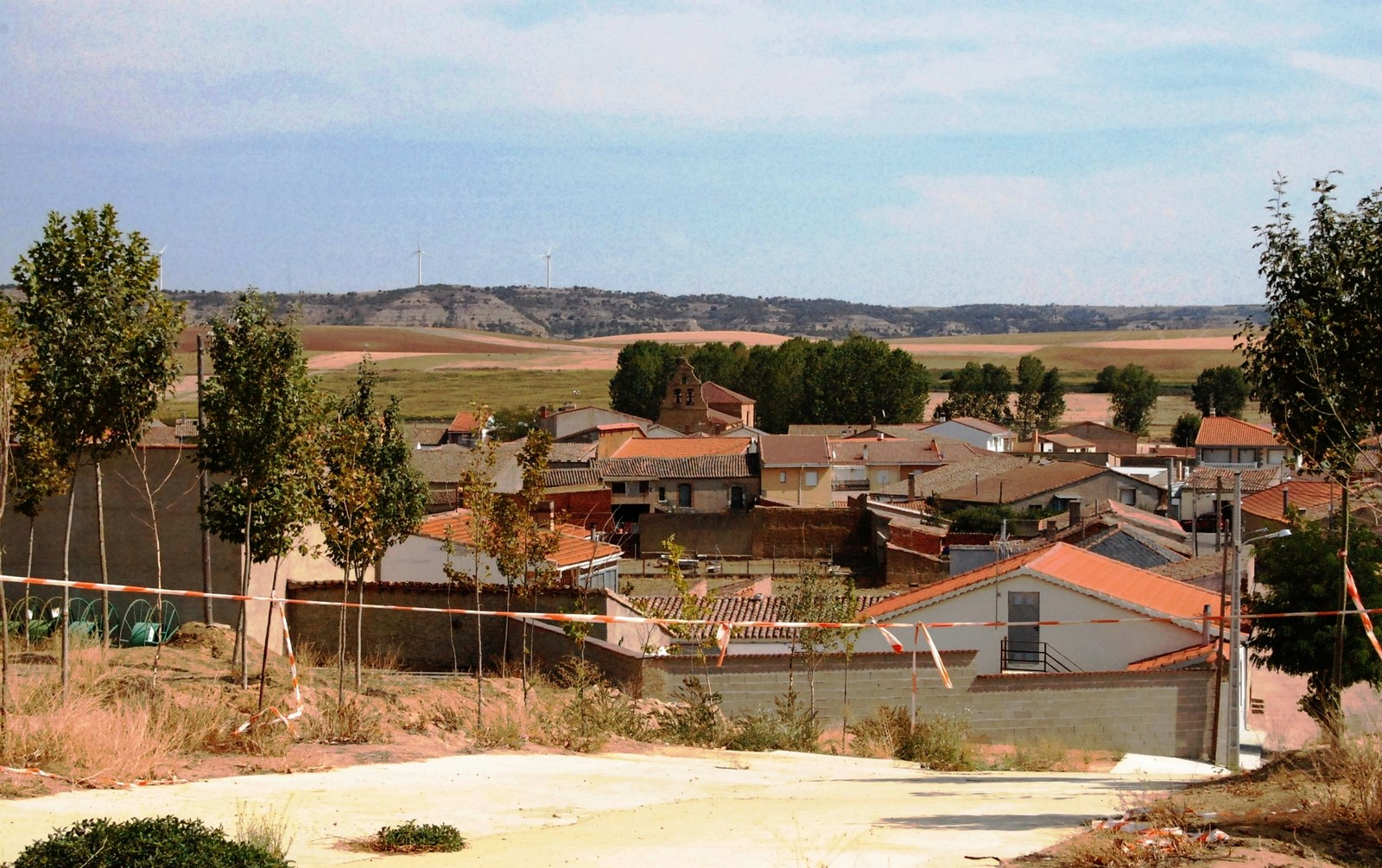
- View of Madridanos
- Interactive map of Madridanos
- Country: Spain
- Autonomous community: Castile and León
- Province: Zamora
- Municipality: Madridanos

Area
  - Total: 32 km^{2} (12 sq mi)

Population (2025-01-01)
  - Total: 461
  - Density: 14/km^{2} (37/sq mi)
- Time zone: UTC+1 (CET)
  - Summer (DST): UTC+2 (CEST)

Madridanos is a municipality located in the province of Zamora, Castile and León, Spain. According to the 2004 census (INE), the municipality has a population of 534 inhabitants.
