= Burganes de Valverde =

Place in Castile and León, Spain

Coordinates: 41°55′N 5°47′W

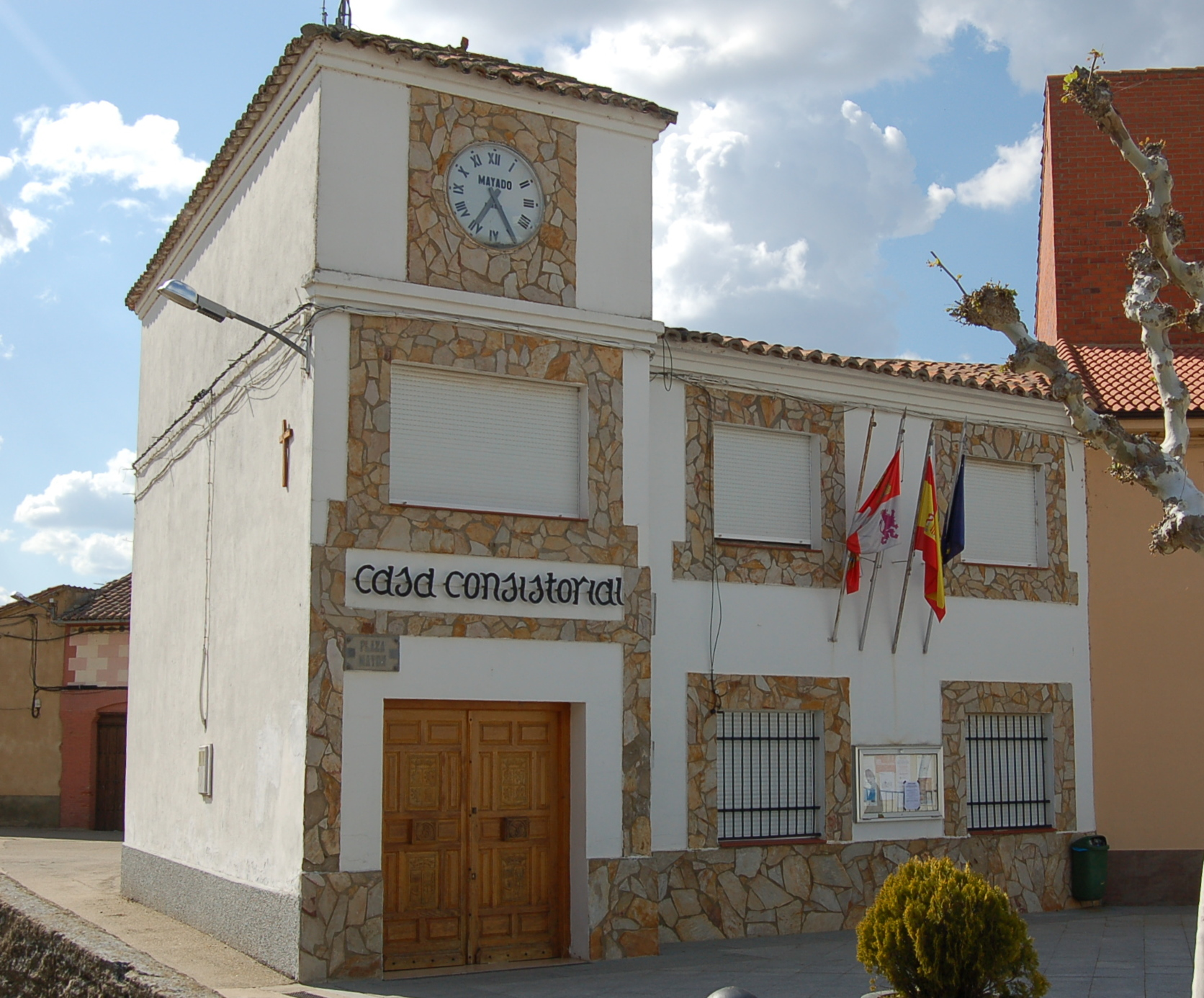
- City Hall
- Interactive map of Burganes de Valverde
- Country: Spain
- Autonomous community: Castile and León
- Province: Zamora
- Municipality: Burganes de Valverde

Area
  - Total: 33 km^{2} (13 sq mi)

Population (2025-01-01)
  - Total: 593
  - Density: 18/km^{2} (47/sq mi)
- Time zone: UTC+1 (CET)
  - Summer (DST): UTC+2 (CEST)

Burganes de Valverde is a municipality located in the province of Zamora, Castile and León, Spain. According to the 2009 census (INE), the municipality has a population of 810 inhabitants.
