= Villalcampo =

Coordinates: 41°31′N 6°03′W

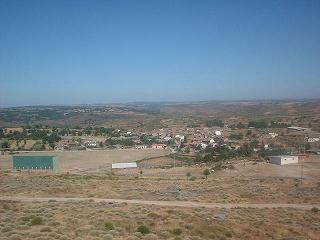

- Flag Coat of arms
- Interactive map of Villalcampo
- Country: Spain
- Autonomous community: Castile and León
- Province: Zamora
- Municipality: Villalcampo

Area
  - Total: 64 km^{2} (25 sq mi)

Population (2025-01-01)
  - Total: 380
  - Density: 5.9/km^{2} (15/sq mi)
- Time zone: UTC+1 (CET)
  - Summer (DST): UTC+2 (CEST)
- Website: Official website

Villalcampo is a municipality located in the province of Zamora, Castile and León, Spain. According to the 2004 census (INE), the municipality has a population of 624 inhabitants.

== Town hall ==
Villalcampo is home to the town hall of 3 villages:

- Villalcampo (288 inhabitants, INE 2020).
- Carbajosa (123 inhabitants, INE 2020).
- Salto de Villalcampo (0 inhabitants, INE 2020).
