= El Cubo de Tierra del Vino =

Coordinates: 41°15′N 5°42′W

El Cubo de Tierra del Vino, Spain
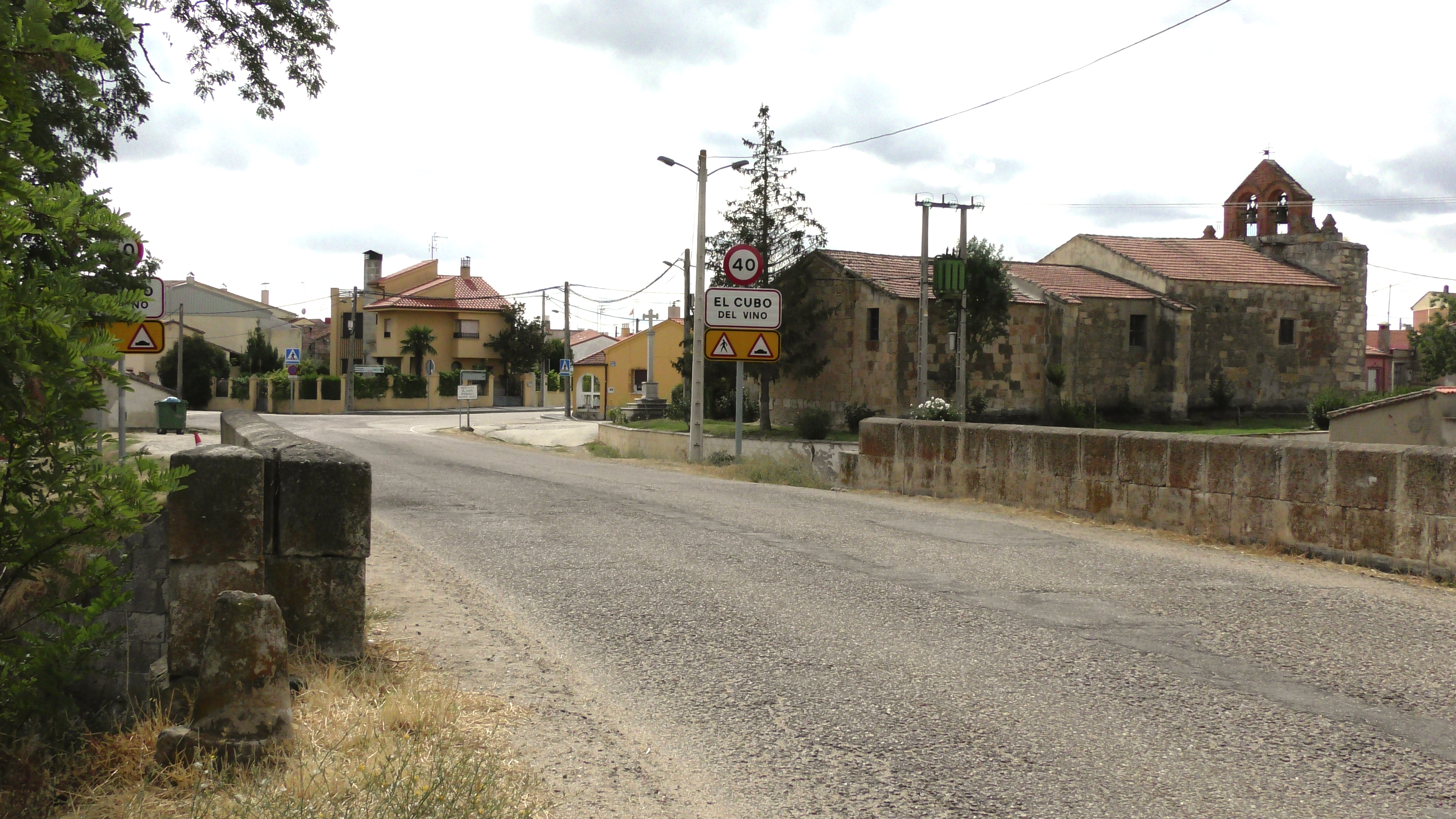
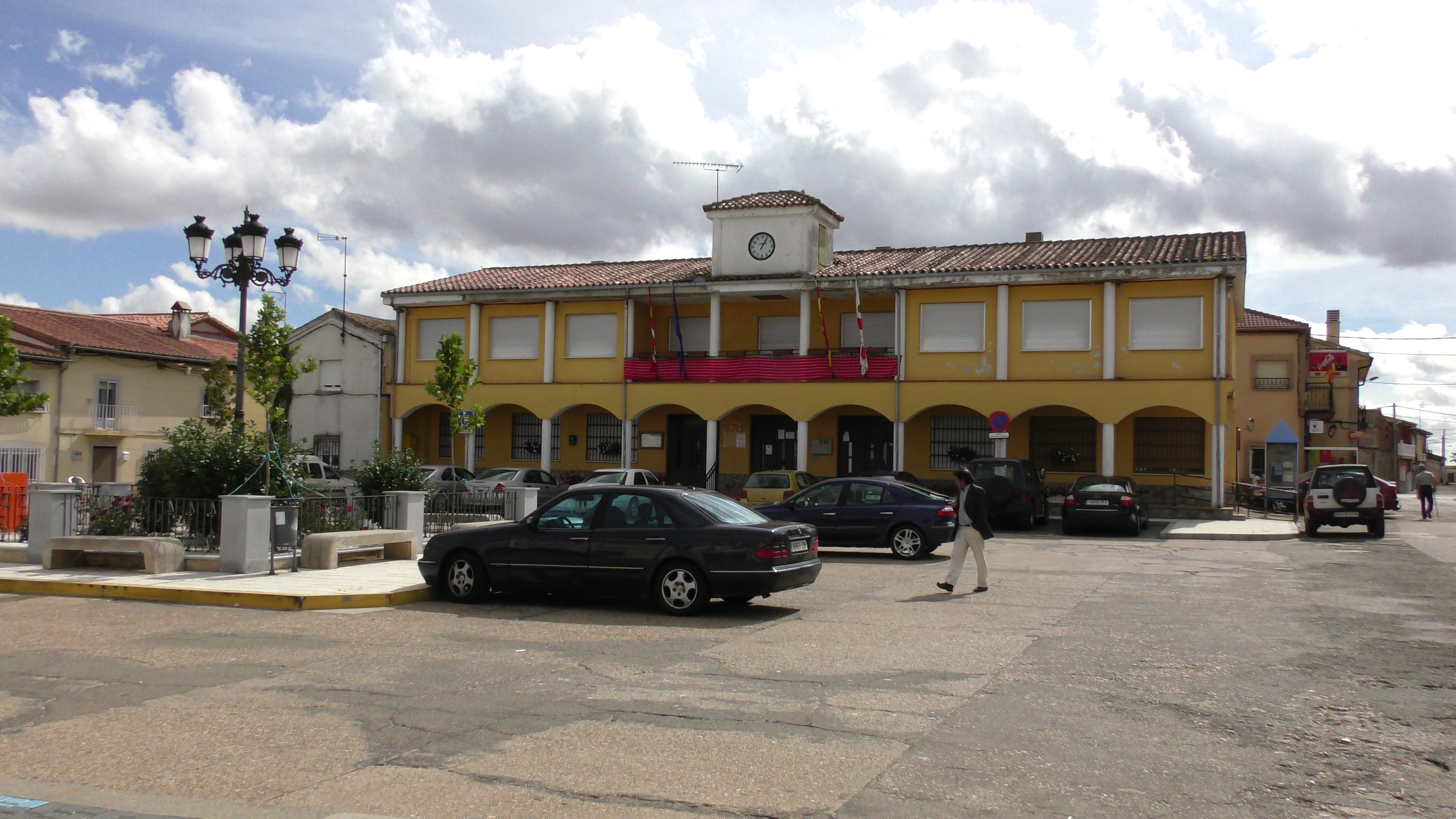
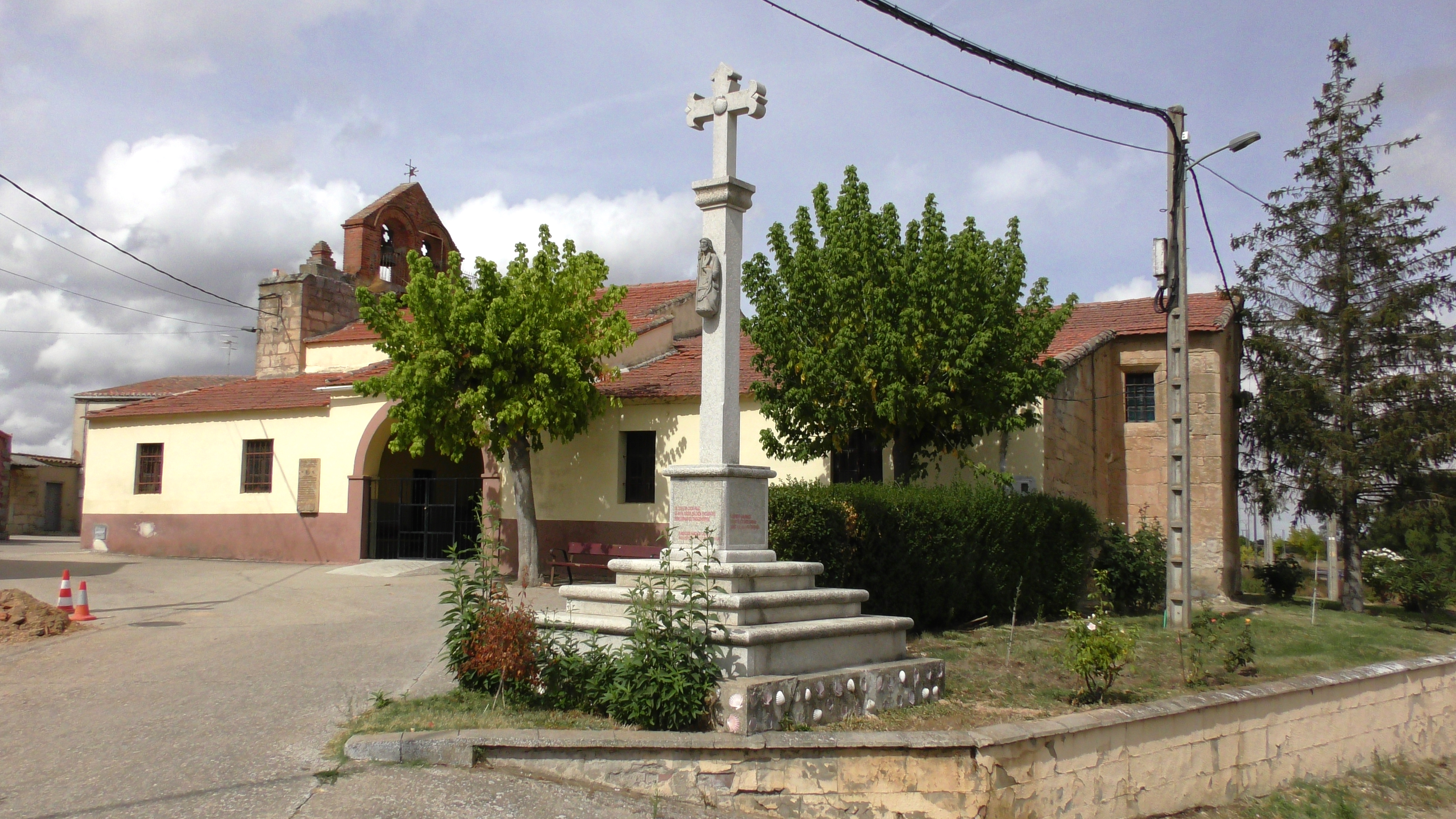
- Top down: view of El Cubo, City Hall and parish church.

- Flag Coat of arms
- Nickname: El Cubo del Vino
- Interactive map of El Cubo de Tierra del Vino, Spain
- Country: Spain
- Autonomous community: Castile and León
- Province: Zamora
- Municipality: El Cubo de Tierra del Vino

Area
  - Total: 33 km^{2} (13 sq mi)

Population (2025-01-01)
  - Total: 294
  - Density: 8.9/km^{2} (23/sq mi)
- Time zone: UTC+1 (CET)
  - Summer (DST): UTC+2 (CEST)
- Website: www.cubodelvino.es

El Cubo de Tierra del Vino is a municipality located in the province of Zamora, Castile and León, Spain. According to the 2009 census (INE), the municipality has a population of 429 inhabitants.

It was probably the city named Sabaria in some chronicles of the Roman age.
