= Ferreruela =

Coordinates: 41.766°N 6.072°W

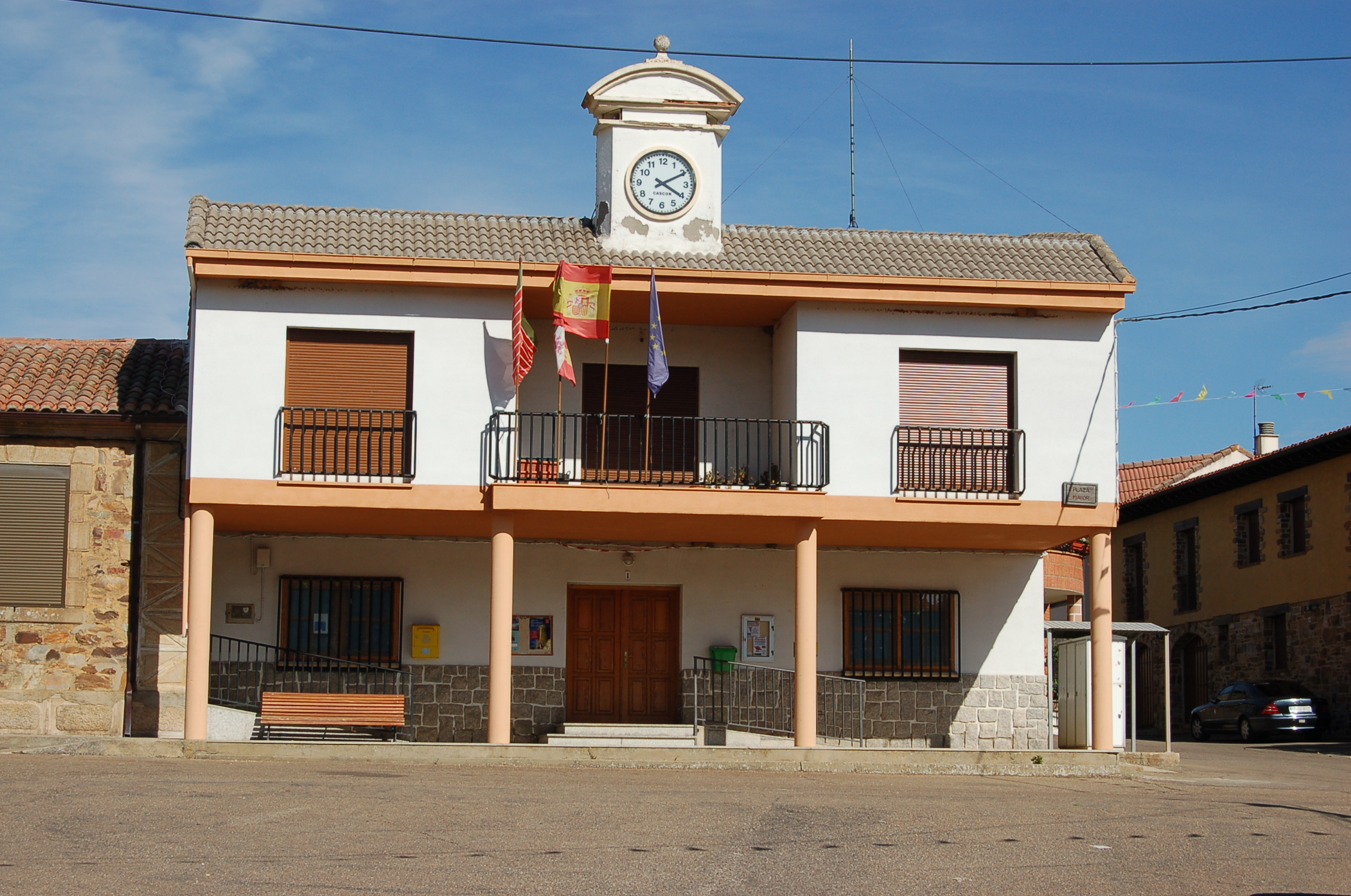
- Interactive map of Ferreruela
- Country: Spain
- Autonomous community: Castile and León
- Province: Zamora
- Municipality: Ferreruela

Area
  - Total: 94 km^{2} (36 sq mi)

Population (2025-01-01)
  - Total: 409
  - Density: 4.4/km^{2} (11/sq mi)
- Time zone: UTC+1 (CET)
  - Summer (DST): UTC+2 (CEST)
- Website: Official website

Ferreruela is a municipality located in the province of Zamora, Castile and León, Spain. According to the 2004 census (INE), the municipality has a population of 596 inhabitants.

== Towns ==
Ferreruela includes 3 towns:

- Ferreruela de Tábara (208 inhabitants, INE 2020).
- Sesnández de Tábara (145 inhabitants, INE 2020).
- Escober de Tábara (93 inhabitants, INE 2020).
