= Cubo de Benavente =

Coordinates: 42°07′N 6°10′W

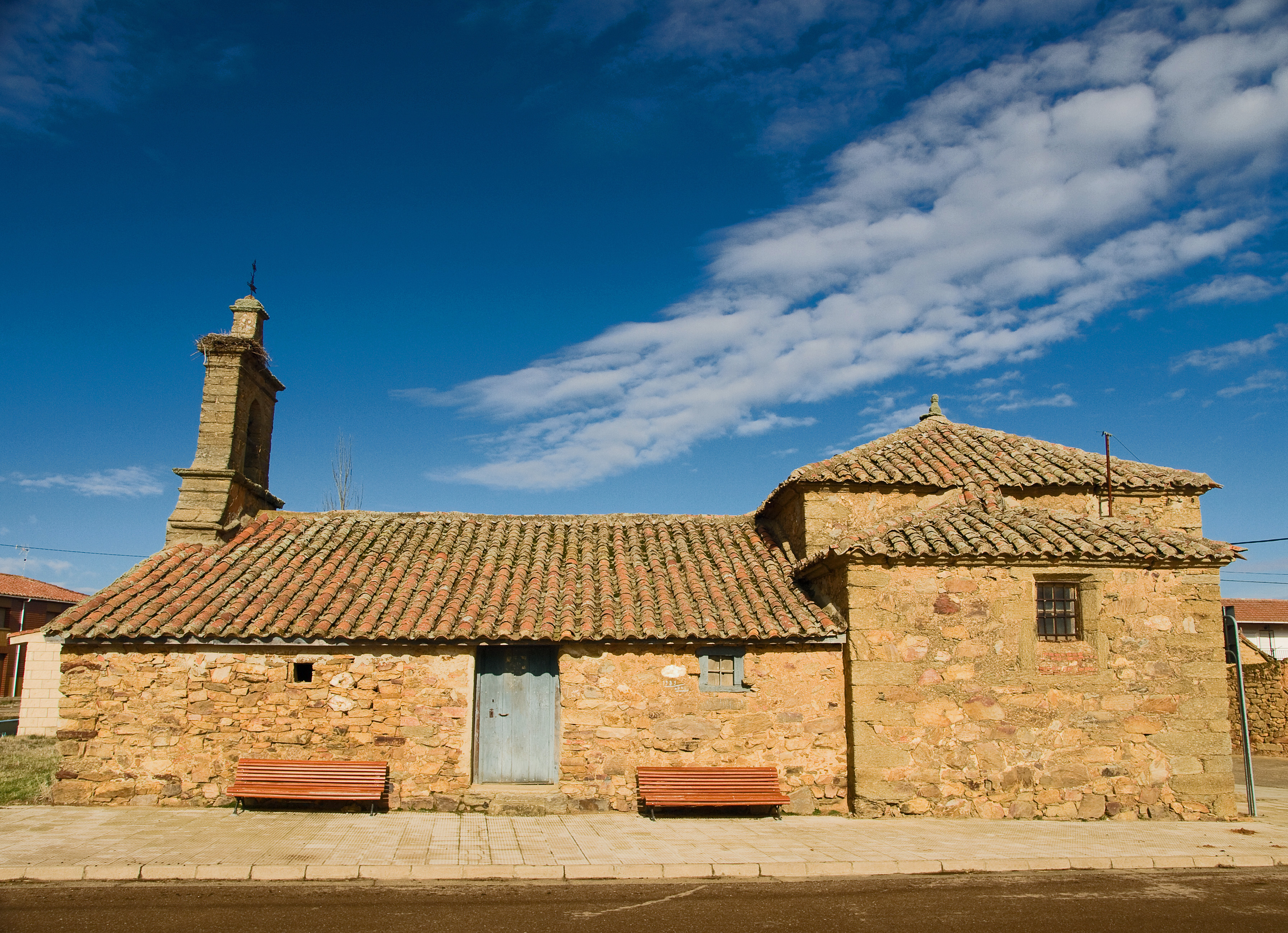
- Interactive map of Cubo de Benavente
- Country: Spain
- Autonomous community: Castile and León
- Province: Zamora
- Municipality: Cubo de Benavente

Area
  - Total: 31 km^{2} (12 sq mi)

Population (2025-01-01)
  - Total: 115
  - Density: 3.7/km^{2} (9.6/sq mi)
- Time zone: UTC+1 (CET)
  - Summer (DST): UTC+2 (CEST)

Cubo de Benavente is a municipality located in the province of Zamora, Castile and León, Spain. According to the 2009 census (INE), the municipality has a population of 140 inhabitants.
