= Andavías =

Place in Castile and León, Spain

Coordinates: 41°36′00″N 5°51′00″W

Andavías, Spain
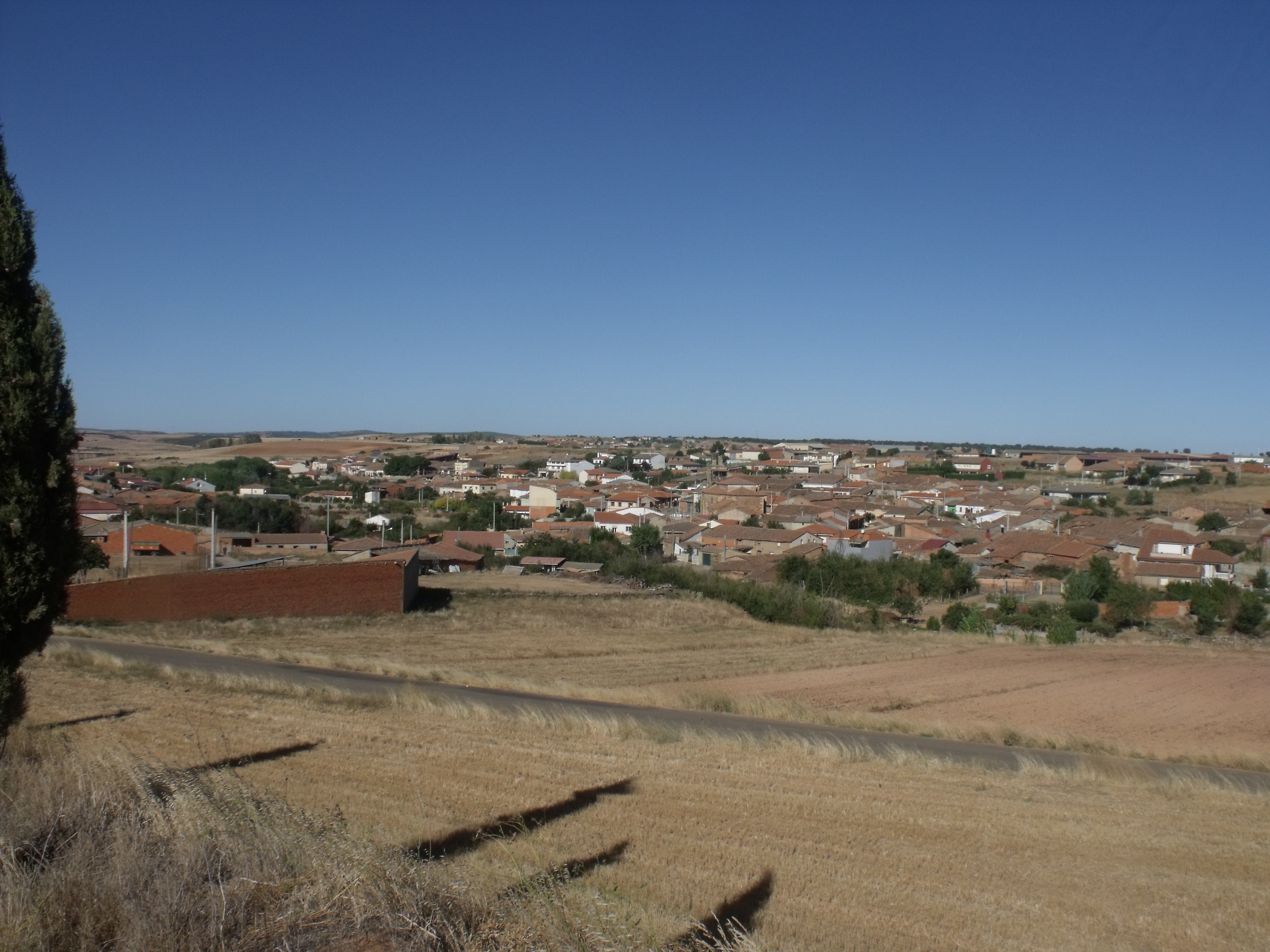
- Interactive map of Andavías, Spain
- Country: Spain
- Autonomous community: Castile and León
- Province: Zamora
- Municipality: Andavías

Area
  - Total: 23 km^{2} (8.9 sq mi)

Population (2025-01-01)
  - Total: 404
  - Density: 18/km^{2} (45/sq mi)
- Time zone: UTC+1 (CET)
  - Summer (DST): UTC+2 (CEST)
- Climate: Csb

Andavías is a municipality located in the province of Zamora, Castile and León, Spain. According to the 2004 census (INE), the municipality has a population of 458 inhabitants.
