= List of municipalities in Zamora =

Map of Spain with Zamora highlighted

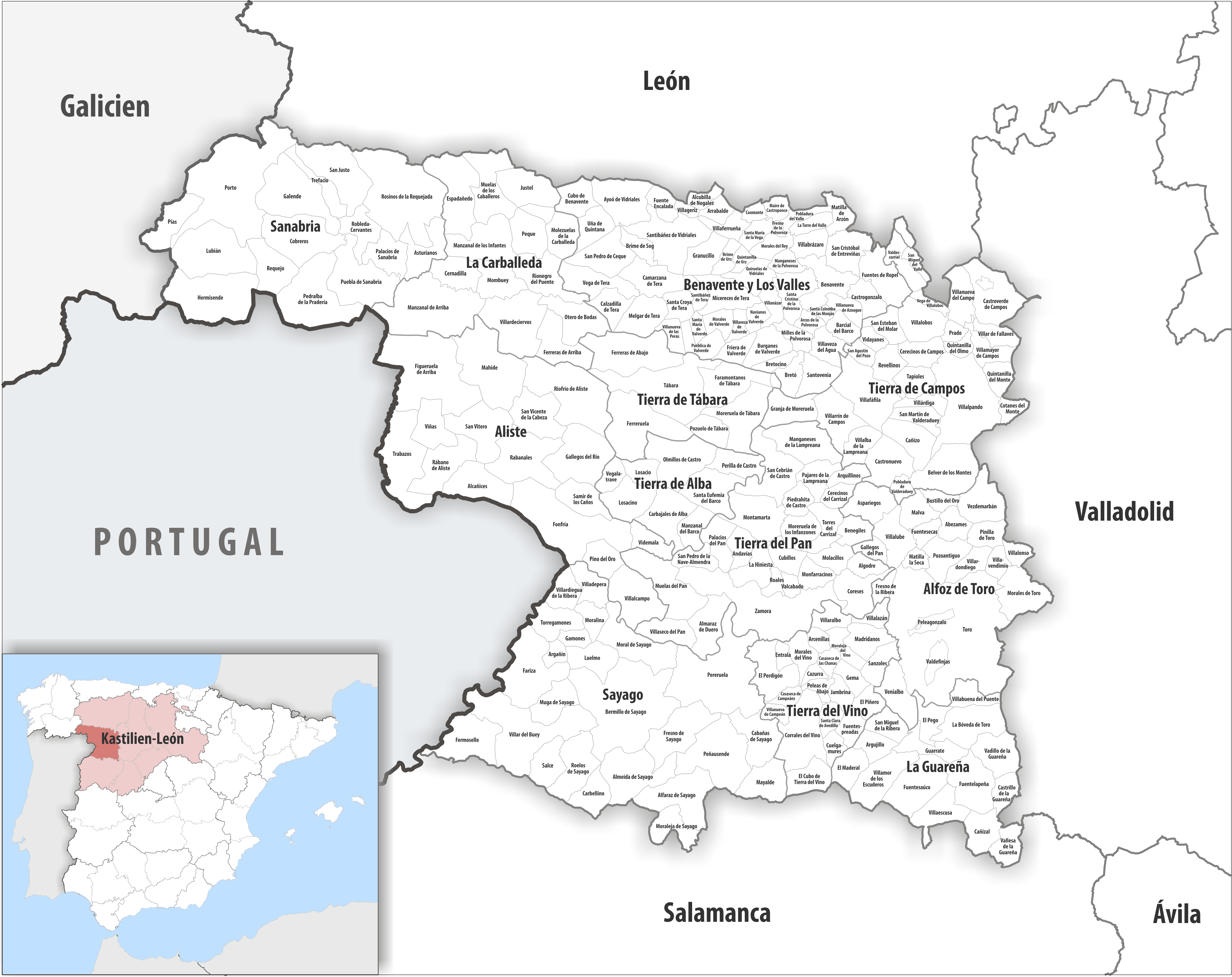
Map of the municipalities in the province of Zamora

Zamora (pronounced [θaˈmoɾa]) is a Spanish province of western Spain, in the western part of the autonomous community of Castile and León. It is bordered by the provinces of Ourense, León, Valladolid, and Salamanca, and by Portugal. Currently the province has a population of 185,432 (2014) with nearly a third living in the capital Zamora.

== Municipalities ==
Overall the province has a total of 250 municipalities which are listed below:

Name	Population (2016)	Area (km^{2})	Elevation (masl)	Shield	Flag	Main city	Population centers (population on brackets)	Region
Abezames	65	23,26	733			Abezames	Abezames (65)	Alfoz de Toro
Alcañices	1111	54,76	806			Alcañices	Alcañices (935) Alcorcillo (98) Vivinera (58) Santa Ana (20)	Aliste
Alcubilla de Nogales	134	13,67	777			Alcubilla de Nogales	Alcubilla de Nogales (134)	Benavente y Los Valles
Alfaraz de Sayago	149	73,02	813			Alfaraz de Sayago	Alfaraz de Sayago (92) Viñuela de Sayago (57)	Sayago
Algodre	159	18,18	661			Algodre	Algodre (159)	Tierra del Pan
Almaraz de Duero	405	45,61	716			Almaraz de Duero	Almaraz de Duero (405)	Tierra del Pan
Almeida de Sayago	492	76,37	780			Almeida de Sayago	Almeida de Sayago (466) Escuadro (26)	Sayago
Andavías	444	23,14	693			Andavias	Andavías (444)	Tierra del Pan
Arcenillas	404	12,08	697			Arcenillas	Arcenillas (404)	Tierra del Vino
Arcos de la Polvorosa	251	12,24	697			Arcos de la Polvorosa	Arcos de la Polvorosa (251)	Benavente y Los Valles
Argañín	77	12,64	738			Argañín	Argañín (77)	Sayago
Argujillo	271	23,09	769			Argujillo	Argujillo (271)	La Guareña
Arquillinos	119	17,64	673			Arquillinos	Arquillinos (119)	Tierra del Pan
Arrabalde	247	15,77	773			Arrabalde	Arrabalde (247)	Benavente y Los Valles
Aspariegos	279	42,16	667			Aspariegos	Aspariegos (279)	Alfoz de Toro
Asturianos	264	42,60	968			Asturianos	Asturianos (131) Entrepeñas (54) Lagarejos de la Carballeda (27) Rioconejos (23) Villar de los Pisones (16) Cerezal de Sanabria (13)	Sanabria
Ayoó de Vidriales	349	59,97	803			Ayoó de Vidriales	Ayoó de Vidriales (247) Congosta (64) Carracedo (38)	Benavente y Los Valles
Barcial del Barco	267	19,01	711			Barcial del Barco	Barcial del Barco (267)	Benavente y Los Valles
Belver de los Montes	307	68,55	688			Belver de los Montes	Belver de los Montes (307)	Tierra de Campos
Benavente	18 315	45,12	741			Benavente	Benavente (18 315)	Benavente y Los Valles
Benegiles	324	23,33	644			Benegiles	Benegiles (324)	Tierra del Pan
Bermillo de Sayago	1085	189,55	793			Bermillo de Sayago	Bermillo de Sayago (494) Torrefrades (146) Gáname (92) Fresnadillo (88) Piñuel (74) Villamor de Cadozos (74) Villamor de la Ladre (61) Fadón (56)	Sayago
Bóveda de Toro (La)	760	59,45	697			La Bóveda de Toro	La Bóveda de Toro (760)	La Guareña
Bretó	182	21,69	703			Bretó	Bretó (182)	Benavente y Los Valles
Bretocino	238	12,93	710			Bretocino	Bretocino (238)	Benavente y Los Valles
Brime de Sog	147	17,93	761			Brime de Sog	Brime de Sog (147)	Benavente y Los Valles
Brime de Urz	120	14,88	717			Brime de Urz	Brime de Urz (120)	Benavente y Los Valles
Burganes de Valverde	682	33,03	706			Burganes de Valverde	Burganes de Valverde (388) Olmillos de Valverde (294)	Benavente y Los Valles
Bustillo del Oro	87	15,36	704			Bustillo del Oro	Bustillo del Oro (87)	Alfoz de Toro
Cabañas de Sayago	153	49,77	811			Cabañas de Sayago	Cabañas de Sayago (153)	Sayago
Calzadilla de Tera	341	27,23	750			Calzadilla de Tera	Calzadilla de Tera (177) Olleros de Tera (164)	Benavente y Los Valles
Camarzana de Tera	871	47,62	777			Camarzana de Tera	Camarzana de Tera (489) Santa Marta de Tera (200) San Juanico el Nuevo (97) Cabañas de Tera (85)	Benavente y Los Valles
Cañizal	466	35,3	790			Cañizal	Cañizal (466)	La Guareña
Cañizo	243	42,01	676			Cañizo	Cañizo (243)	Tierra de Campos
Carbajales de Alba	553	53,4	752			Carbajales de Alba	Carbajales de Alba (553)	Tierra de Alba
Carbellino	204	32,79	775			Carbellino	Carbellino (204)	Sayago
Casaseca de Campeán	100	12,24	764			Casaseca de Campeán	Casaseca de Campeán (100)	Tierra del Vino
Casaseca de las Chanas	394	12,56	700			Casaseca de las Chanas	Casaseca de las Chanas (394)	Tierra del Vino
Castrillo de la Guareña	126	21,91	729			Castrillo de la Guareña	Castrillo de la Guareña (126)	La Guareña
Castrogonzalo	495	25,11	749			Castrogonzalo	Castrogonzalo (474) Paradores de Castrogonzalo (21)	Benavente y Los Valles
Castronuevo	243	47,89	700			Castronuevo de los Arcos	Castronuevo de los Arcos (243)	Tierra de Campos
Castroverde de Campos	334	64,4	707			Castroverde de Campos	Castroverde de Campos (334)	Tierra de Campos
Cazurra	82	8,39	729			Cazurra	Cazurra (82)	Tierra del Vino
Cerecinos de Campos	297	28,58	699			Cerecinos de Campos	Cerecinos de Campos (297)	Tierra de Campos
Cerecinos del Carrizal	116	17,34	682			Cerecinos del Carrizal	Cerecinos del Carrizal (116)	Tierra del Pan
Cernadilla	128	36,12	908			Cernadilla	Cernadilla (73) San Salvador de Palazuelo (48) Valdemerilla (7)	La Carballeda
Cobreros	588	77,70	1010			Cobreros	Cobreros (70) Barrio de Lomba (101) Castro de Sanabria (75) Santa Colomba de Sanabria (61) Quintana de Sanabria (56) San Martín del Terroso (55) Sotillo de Sanabria (48) San Miguel de Lomba (42) Terroso (27) San Román de Sanabria (21) Avedillo de Sanabria (13) Limianos de Sanabria (12) Riego de Lomba (7)	Sanabria
Coomonte	202	10,25	738			Coomonte	Coomonte (202)	Benavente y Los Valles
Coreses	1050	43,16	645			Coreses	Coreses (1017) La Estación (32) San Pelayo (1)	Tierra del Pan
Corrales del Vino	1022	75,61	821			Corrales del Vino	Corrales del Vino (811) Peleas de Arriba (164) Fuente el Carnero (47)	Tierra del Vino
Cotanes del Monte	113	14,83	713			Cotanes del Monte	Cotanes del Monte (113)	Tierra de Campos
Cubillos	328	24,73	667			Cubillos	Cubillos (328)	Tierra del Pan
Cubo de Benavente	119	31,54	805			Cubo de Benavente	Cubo de Benavente (119)	Benavente y Los Valles
El Cubo de Tierra del Vino	347	34,31	838			El Cubo del Vino	El Cubo de Tierra del Vino (347)	Tierra del Vino
Cuelgamures	90	14,67	809			Cuelgamures	Cuelgamures (90)	Tierra del Vino
Entrala	168	10	708			Entrala	Entrala (168)	Tierra del Vino
Espadañedo	123	77,35	1028			Espadañedo	Espadañedo (51) Carbajales de la Encomienda (27) Faramontanos de la Sierra (20) Vega del Castillo (14) Utrera de la Encomienda (8) Letrillas (3)	La Carballeda
Faramontanos de Tábara	365	54,39	714			Faramontanos de Tábara	Faramontanos de Tábara (365)	Tierra de Tábara
Fariza	548	90,45	703			Fariza	Fariza (202) Badilla (88) Palazuelo de Sayago (88) Zafara (60) Tudera (44) Mámoles (37) Cozcurrita (29)	Sayago
Fermoselle	1277	69,34	640			Fermoselle	Fermoselle (1277)	Sayago
Ferreras de Abajo	555	88,15	826			Ferreras de Abajo	Ferreras de Abajo (437) Litos (118)	Tierra de Tábara
Ferreras de Arriba	405	47,99	897			Ferreras de Arriba	Ferreras de Arriba (276) Villanueva de Valrojo (129)	La Carballeda
Ferreruela	504	94,27	828			Ferreruela de Tábara	Ferreruela (238) Sesnández de Tábara (172) Escober de Tábara (94)	Tierra de Tábara
Figueruela de Arriba	378	152,96	858			Figueruela de Arriba	Figueruela de Arriba (100) Gallegos del Campo (102) Figueruela de Abajo (73) Moldones (42) Riomanzanas (30) Villarino de Manzanas (17) Flechas (14)	Aliste
Fonfría	823	132,23	812			Fonfría	Fonfría (176) Bermillo de Alba (135) Fornillos de Aliste (130) Ceadea (92) Moveros (91) Castro de Alcañices (80) Brandilanes (62) Arcillera (57) Salto de Castro (0)	Aliste
Fresno de la Polvorosa	149	4,11	722			Fresno de la Polvorosa	Fresno de la Polvorosa (149)	Benavente y Los Valles
Fresno de la Ribera	371	13,13	658			Fresno de la Ribera	Fresno de la Ribera (371)	Alfoz de Toro
Fresno de Sayago	199	64,63	814			Fresno de Sayago	Fresno de Sayago (125) Mogátar y Los Maniles (74)	Sayago
Friera de Valverde	177	19,93	719			Friera de Valverde	Friera de Valverde (177)	Benavente y Los Valles
Fuente Encalada	114	20,86	752			Fuente Encalada	Fuente Encalada (114)	Benavente y Los Valles
Fuentelapeña	761	58,23	735			Fuentelapeña	Fuentelapeña (761)	La Guareña
Fuentes de Ropel	409	48,73	725			Fuentes de Ropel	Fuentes de Ropel (409)	Benavente y Los Valles
Fuentesaúco	1606	67,85	823			Fuentesaúco	Fuentesaúco (1606)	La Guareña
Fuentesecas	58	14,60	701			Fuentesecas	Fuentesecas (58)	Alfoz de Toro
Fuentespreadas	322	20,07	767			Fuentespreadas	Fuentespreadas (322)	Tierra del Vino
Galende	1141	90,26	944			Galende	Galende (117) El Puente (369) Vigo (160) San Martín de Castañeda (135) Ribadelago Nuevo (87) Ilanes (74) Cubelo (73) Pedrazales (53) Rabanillo (40) Ribadelago (30) Moncabril (3)	Sanabria
Gallegos del Pan	125	15,66	691			Gallegos del Pan	Gallegos del Pan (125)	Alfoz de Toro
Gallegos del Río	544	77,79	719			Gallegos del Río	Gallegos del Río (96) Domez (173) Valer (97) Puercas (67) Flores (50) Lober (42) Tolilla (19)	Aliste
Gamones	99	13,37	775			Gamones	Gamones (99)	Sayago
Gema	229	17,85	706			Gema	Gema (229)	Tierra del Vino
Granja de Moreruela	292	41,54	730			Granja de Moreruela	Granja de Moreruela (289) La Tabla (3)	Tierra de Campos
Granucillo	138	32,55	733			Granucillo	Granucillo (63) Grijalba de Vidriales (39) Cunquilla de Vidriales (36)	Benavente y Los Valles
Guarrate	343	31,60	734			Guarrate	Guarrate (343)	La Guareña
Hermisende	251	108,75	853			Hermisende	Hermisende (85) Castromil (94) San Ciprián (29) La Tejera (25) Castrelos (18)	Sanabria
La Hiniesta	330	33,10	691			La Hiniesta	La Hiniesta (330)	Tierra del Pan
Jambrina	174	16,64	706			Jambrina	Jambrina (174)	Tierra del Vino
Justel	88	50,90	990			Justel	Justel (39) Villalverde (39) Quintanilla (10)	La Carballeda
Losacino	230	44,10	700			Losacino	Losacino (49) Muga de Alba (154) Vide de Alba (22) Castillo de Alba (5)	Tierra de Alba
Losacio	125	21,80	758			Losacio	Losacio (125)	Tierra de Alba
Lubián	326	94,39	1030			Lubián	Lubián (171) Chanos (51) Padornelo (36) Aciberos (34) Hedroso (22) Las Hedradas (12)	Sanabria
Luelmo	164	36,34	793			Luelmo	Luelmo (137) Monumenta (27)	Sayago
El Maderal	206	29,71	840			El Maderal	El Maderal (206)	La Guareña
Madridanos	481	32,10	660			Madridanos	Madridanos (459) Bamba (22)	Tierra del Vino
Mahide	353	108,87	823			Mahide	Mahide (116) Pobladura de Aliste (100) Las Torres de Aliste (65) Boya (54) San Pedro de las Herrerías (18)	Aliste
Maire de Castroponce	161	14,43	744			Maire de Castroponce	Maire de Castroponce (161)	Benavente y Los Valles
Malva	132	27,33	713			Malva	Malva (132)	Alfoz de Toro
Manganeses de la Lampreana	499	60,02	703			Manganeses de la Lampreana	Manganeses de la Lampreana (382) Riego del Camino (117)	Tierra del Pan
Manganeses de la Polvorosa	707	16,37	716			Manganeses de la Polvorosa	Manganeses de la Polvorosa (707)	Benavente y Los Valles
Manzanal de Arriba	373	130,16	885			Manzanal de Arriba	Manzanal de Arriba (68) Codesal (112) Sagallos (69) Folgoso de la Carballeda (64) Sandín (27) Pedroso de la Carballeda (14) Santa Cruz de los Cuérragos (10) Linarejos (9)	La Carballeda
Manzanal de los Infantes	138	64,54	928			Manzanal de los Infantes	Manzanal de los Infantes (23) Otero de los Centenos (34) Donadillo (29) Lanseros (22) Sejas de Sanabria (22) Dornillas (8)	La Carballeda
Manzanal del Barco	136	12,41	691			Manzanal del Barco	Manzanal del Barco (136)	Tierra de Alba
Matilla de Arzón	174	30,25	738			Matilla de Arzón	Matilla de Arzón (174)	Benavente y Los Valles
Matilla la Seca	45	12,13	738			Matilla la Seca	Matilla la Seca (45)	Alfoz de Toro
Mayalde	202	43,71	895			Mayalde	Mayalde (202)	Sayago
Melgar de Tera	409	40,91	745			Melgar de Tera	Melgar de Tera (206) Pumarejo de Tera (203)	Benavente y Los Valles
Micereces de Tera	488	34,04	719			Micereces de Tera	Micereces de Tera (160) Aguilar de Tera (194) Abraveses de Tera (134)	Benavente y Los Valles
Milles de la Polvorosa	228	18,12	699			Milles de la Polvorosa	Milles de la Polvorosa (228)	Benavente y Los Valles
Molacillos	268	23,68	639			Molacillos	Molacillos (268)	Tierra del Pan
Molezuelas de la Carballeda	82	34,56	810			Molezuelas de la Carballeda	Molezuelas de la Carballeda (82)	La Carballeda
Mombuey	425	39,11	890			Mombuey	Mombuey (346) Valparaíso (57) Fresno de la Carballeda (22)	La Carballeda
Monfarracinos	986	22,02	641			Monfarracinos	Monfarracinos (986)	Tierra del Pan
Montamarta	587	56,81	687			Montamarta	Montamarta (587)	Tierra del Pan
Moral de Sayago	271	67,04	726			Moral de Sayago	Moral de Sayago (170) Abelón (101)	Sayago
Moraleja de Sayago	249	33,70	811			Moraleja de Sayago	Moraleja de Sayago (249)	Sayago
Moraleja del Vino	1692	19,49	685			Moraleja del Vino	Moraleja del Vino (1692)	Tierra del Vino
Morales del Rey	599	20,14	722			Morales del Rey	Morales de Rey (505) Vecilla de la Polvorosa (94)	Benavente y Los Valles
Morales de Toro	1008	53,45	700			Morales de Toro	Morales de Toro (1008)	Alfoz de Toro
Morales de Valverde	187	18,01	723			Morales de Valverde	Morales de Valverde (126) San Pedro de Zamudia (61)	Benavente y Los Valles
Morales del Vino	2966	23,68	697			Morales del Vino	Morales del Vino (2893) Pontejos (73)	Tierra del Vino
Moralina	282	20,90	764			Moralina	Moralina (282)	Sayago
Moreruela de los Infanzones	362	31,26	668			Moreruela de los Infanzones	Moreruela de los Infanzones (362)	Tierra del Pan
Moreruela de Tábara	332	68,15	700			Moreruela de Tábara	Moreruela de Tábara (184) Santa Eulalia de Tábara (148)	Tierra de Tábara
Muelas de los Caballeros	188	71,58	985			Muelas de los Caballeros	Muelas de los Caballeros (139) Donado (28) Gramedo (21)	La Carballeda
Muelas del Pan	677	72,61	772			Muelas del Pan	Muelas del Pan (424) Ricobayo de Alba (135) Cerezal de Aliste (102) Villaflor (16)	Tierra del Pan
Muga de Sayago	368	36,42	773			Muga de Sayago	Muga de Sayago (368)	Sayago
Navianos de Valverde	203	14,12	706			Navianos de Valverde	Navianos de Valverde (203)	Benavente y Los Valles
Olmillos de Castro	248	71,39	765			Olmillos de Castro	Olmillos de Castro (71) San Martín de Tábara (81) Márquiz de Alba (79) Navianos de Alba (17)	Tierra de Alba
Otero de Bodas	178	49,94	836			Otero de Bodas	Otero de Bodas (140) Val de Santa María (38)	La Carballeda
Pajares de la Lampreana	365	27,95	696			Pajares de la Lampreana	Pajares de la Lampreana (365)	Tierra del Pan
Palacios de Sanabria	260	36,87	954			Palacios de Sanabria	Palacios de Sanabria (141) Vime de Sanabria (71) Otero de Sanabria (26) Remesal (22)	Sanabria
Palacios del Pan	261	31,91	717			Palacios del Pan	Palacios del Pan (261)	Tierra del Pan
Pedralba de la Pradería	292	105,11	990			Pedralba de la Pradrería	Pedralba de la Pradería (87) Calabor (101) Lobeznos (36) Santa Cruz de Abranes (36) Rihonor de Castilla (32)	Sanabria
El Pego	314	26,92	760			El Pego	El Pego (314)	La Guareña
Peleagonzalo	258	13,29	653			Peleagonzalo	Peleagonzalo (258)	Alfoz de Toro
Peleas de Abajo	259	12,01	700			Peleas de Abajo	Peleas de Abajo (259)	Tierra del Vino
Peñausende	415	95,02	869			Peñausende	Peñausende (318) Tamame (74) Figueruela de Sayago (23)	Sayago
Peque	147	38,88	855			Peque	Peque (147)	La Carballeda
El Perdigón	720	51,22	720			El Perdigón	El Perdigón (470) San Marcial (146) Tardobispo (104)	Tierra del Vino
Pereruela	578	160,86	739			Pereruela	Pereruela (284) Sobradillo de Palomares (78) Malillos (44) Sogo (40) Pueblica de Campeán (33) La Tuda (33) Arcillo (23) San Román de los Infantes (18) Las Enillas (13) Cernecina (12)	Sayago
Perilla de Castro	181	33,11	730			Perilla de Castro	Perilla de Castro (172) La Encomienda (9)	Tierra de Alba
Pías	138	43,98	1063			Pías	Pías (20) Barjacoba (64) Villanueva de la Sierra (54)	Sanabria
Piedrahita de Castro	88	21,02	699	78x78px	80px	Piedrahíta de Castro	Piedrahita de Castro (88)	Tierra del Pan
Pinilla de Toro	247	24,27	768			Pinilla de Toro	Pinilla de Toro (247)	Alfoz de Toro
Pino del Oro	215	29,57	731			Pino del Oro	Pino (215)	Aliste
El Piñero	242	29,57	731			El Piñero	El Piñero (242)	Tierra del Vino
Pobladura de Valderaduey	44	12,54	665			Pobladura de Valderaduey	Pobladura de Valderaduey (44)	Tierra de Campos
Pobladura del Valle	310	14,15	736			Pobladura del Valle	Pobladura del Valle (310)	Benavente y Los Valles
Porto	188	200,82	1211			Porto	Porto (188)	Sanabria
Pozoantiguo	242	37,68	715			Pozoantiguo	Pozoantiguo (242)	Alfoz de Toro
Pozuelo de Tábara	172	25,69	702			Pozuelo de Tábara	Pozuelo de Tábara (172)	Tierra de Tábara
Prado	59	10,95	749			Prado	Prado (59)	Tierra de Campos
Puebla de Sanabria	1460	81,39	941			Puebla de Sanabria	Puebla de Sanabria (1240) Castellanos (97) Ungilde (80) Robledo (43)	Sanabria
Pueblica de Valverde	214	25,76	734			Pueblica de Valverde	Pueblica de Valverde (139) Bercianos de Valverde (75)	Benavente y Los Valles
Quintanilla de Urz	106	10,05	725			Quintanilla de Urz	Quintanilla de Urz (106)	Benavente y Los Valles
Quintanilla del Monte	102	21,71	910			Quintanilla del Monte	Quintanilla del Monte (102)	Tierra de Campos
Quintanilla del Olmo	32	12,59	695			Quintanilla del Olmo	Quintanilla del Olmo (32)	Tierra de Campos
Quiruelas de Vidriales	706	27,99	720			Quiruelas de Vidriales	Quiruelas de Vidriales (428) Colinas de Trasmonte (278)	Benavente y Los Valles
Rabanales	562	80,29	839			Rabanales	Rabanales (213) Grisuela (103) Matellanes (99) Fradellos (58) Mellanes (52) Ufones (37)	Aliste
Rábano de Aliste	405	55,95	800			Rábano de Aliste	Rábano de Aliste (89) Sejas de Aliste (131) Tola (123) San Mamed (62)	Aliste
Requejo	149	46,15	998			Requejo	Requejo (149)	Sanabria
Revellinos	269	27,86	696			Revellinos de Campos	Revellinos (269)	Tierra de Campos
Riofrío de Aliste	739	111,37	788			Riofrío de Aliste	Riofrío de Aliste (252) Sarracín de Aliste (271) Abejera (137) Cabañas de Aliste (79)	Aliste
Rionegro del Puente	297	53,44	800			Rionegro del Puente	Rionegro del Puente (164) Santa Eulalia del Río Negro (103) Valleluengo (15) Villar de Farfón (15)	La Carballeda
Roales del Pan	856	10,89	742			Roales del Pan	Roales (856)	Tierra del Pan
Robleda-Cervantes	448	32,47	1019			Robleda	Robleda (115) Valdespino (158) Sampil (47) San Juan de la Cuesta (34) Paramio (29) Cervantes (27) Triufé (24) Ferreros (14)	Sanabria
Roelos de Sayago	171	54,99	761			Roelos de Sayago	Roelos de Sayago (171)	Sayago
Rosinos de la Requejada	387	154,78	1027			Rosinos de la Requejada	Rosinos de la Requejada (102) Anta de Rioconejos (62) Santiago de la Requejada (61) Doney de la Requejada (59) Villarejo de la Sierra (37) Carbajalinos (27) Rionegrito (20) Escuredo (12) Monterrubio (6) Gusandanos (1)	Sanabria
Salce	103	34,86	755			Salce	Salce (103)	Sayago
Samir de los Caños	182	36,54	779			Samir de los Caños	Samir de los Caños (182)	Aliste
San Agustín del Pozo	188	14,49	693			San Agustín del Pozo	San Agustín del Pozo (188)	Tierra de Campos
San Cebrián de Castro	269	65,86	687			San Cebrián de Castro	San Cebrián de Castro (178) Fontanillas de Castro (91)	Tierra del Pan
San Cristóbal de Entreviñas	1454	42,53	748			San Cristóbal de Entreviñas	San Cristóbal de Entreviñas (1279) Santa Colomba de las Carabias (154) San Miguel del Esla (21)	Benavente y Los Valles
San Esteban del Molar	125	25,03	730			San Esteban del Molar	San Esteban del Molar (125)	Tierra de Campos
San Justo	234	75,20	1061			San Justo	San Justo (49) San Ciprián (69) Rábano de Sanabria (54) Rozas (33) Coso (22) Barrio de Rábano (7)	Sanabria
San Martín de Valderaduey	63	23,94	679			San Martín de Valderaduey	San Martín de Valderaduey (63)	Tierra de Campos
San Miguel de la Ribera	303	26,33	765			San Miguel de la Ribera	San Miguel de la Ribera (303)	La Guareña
San Miguel del Valle	145	10,57	738			San Miguel del Valle	San Miguel del Valle (145)	Tierra de Campos
San Pedro de Ceque	503	49,13	758			San Pedro de Ceque	San Pedro de Ceque (503)	Benavente y Los Valles
San Pedro de la Nave-Almendra	370	22,60	720			Almendra	Almendra (180) Valdeperdices (149) Campillo (41)	Tierra del Pan
San Pedro de Zamudia	58	TBD	750			San Pedro de Zamudia	San Pedro de Zamudia (58)	Benavente y Los Valles
San Vicente de la Cabeza	417	53,50	764			San Vicente de la Cabeza	San Vicente de la Cabeza (125) Bercianos de Aliste (145) Palazuelo de las Cuevas (114) Campogrande de Aliste (33)	Aliste
San Vitero	543	64,05	875			San Vitero	San Vitero (253) San Juan del Rebollar (182) El Poyo (60) San Cristóbal de Aliste (39) Villarino de Cebal (9)	Aliste
Santa Clara de Avedillo	180	16,81	788			Santa Clara de Avedillo	Santa Clara de Avedillo (180)	Tierra del Vino
Santa Colomba de las Monjas	276	6,78	699			Santa Colomba de las Monjas	Santa Colomba de las Monjas (276)	Benavente y Los Valles
Santa Cristina de la Polvorosa	1088	39,03	734			Santa Cristina de la Polvorosa	Santa Cristina de la Polvorosa (1088)	Benavente y Los Valles
Santa Croya de Tera	322	21,16	729			Santa Croya de Tera	Santa Croya de Tera (322)	Benavente y Los Valles
Santa Eufemia del Barco	189	52,18	730			Santa Eufemia del Barco	Santa Eufemia del Barco (87) Losilla (93) San Pedro de las Cuevas (9)	Tierra de Alba
Santa María de la Vega	342	17,88	728			Santa María de la Vega	Santa María de la Vega (342)	Benavente y Los Valles
Santa María de Valverde	60	9,76	733			Santa Maria de Valverde	Santa María de Valverde (60)	Benavente y Los Valles
Santibáñez de Tera	400	18,98	735			Santibáñez de Tera	Santibáñez de Tera (267) Sitrama de Tera (133)	Benavente y Los Valles
Santibáñez de Vidriales	1021	75,88	781			Santibáñez de Vidriales	Santibáñez de Vidriales (534) San Pedro de la Viña (193) Pozuelo de Vidriales (76) Tardemézar (64) Moratones (53) Bercianos de Vidriales (41) Rosinos de Vidriales (36) Villaobispo (24)	Benavente y Los Valles
Santovenia	268	32,96	708			Santovenia	Santovenia (268)	Benavente y Los Valles
Sanzoles	539	25,66	719			Sanzoles	Sanzoles (539)	Tierra del Vino
Tábara	797	112,68	750			Tábara	Tábara (797)	Tierra de Tábara
Tapioles	164	27,50	691			Tapioles	Tapioles (164)	Tierra de Campos
Toro	9115	324,79	710			Toro	Toro (8675) Tagarabuena (350) El Gejo (32) Granja Florencia (21) Monte la Reina (16) La Azucarera (11) Villaguer (6) Villaveza (4)	Alfoz de Toro
La Torre del Valle	148	16,59	738			La Torre del Valle	La Torre del Valle (135) Paladinos del Valle (13)	Benavente y Los Valles
Torregamones	294	37,07	730			Torregamones	Torregamones (294)	Sayago
Torres del Carrizal	430	30,41	646			Torres del Carrizal	Torres del Carrizal (430)	Tierra del Pan
Trabazos	967	93,45	681			Trabazos	Trabazos (446) Nuez (317) San Martín del Pedroso (81) Villarino Tras la Sierra (67) Latedo (56)	Aliste
Trefacio	186	25,67	970			Trefacio	Trefacio (125) Villarino de Sanabria (31) Murias (19) Cerdillo (11)	Sanabria
Uña de Quintana	150	29,78	782			Uña de Quintana	Uña de Quintana (150)	Benavente y Los Valles
Vadillo de la Guareña	279	44,16	713			Vadillo de la Guareña	Vadillo de la Guareña (279)	La Guareña
Valcabado	359	10,19	679			Valcabado	Valcabado (359)	Tierra del Pan
Valdefinjas	54	16,30	728			Valdefinjas	Valdefinjas (54)	Alfoz de Toro
Valdescorriel	141	27,84	736			Valdescorriel	Valdescorriel (141)	Tierra de Campos
Vallesa de la Guareña	99	28,07	764			Vallesa de la Guareña	Vallesa de la Guareña (74) Olmo de la Guareña (25)	La Guareña
Vega de Tera	371	44,16	771			Vega de Tera	Vega de Tera (65) Calzada de Tera (135) Junquera de Tera (105) Milla de Tera (66)	Benavente y Los Valles
Vega de Villalobos	117	10,14	735			Vega de Villalobos	Vega de Villalobos (117)	Tierra de Campos
Vegalatrave	92	18,57	698			Vegalatrave	Vegalatrave (92)	Tierra de Alba
Venialbo	473	42,05	700			Venialbo	Venialbo (473)	Alfoz de Toro
Vezdemarbán	417	47,92	775			Vezdemarbán	Vezdemarbán (417)	Alfoz de Toro
Vidayanes	88	12,41	708			Vidayanes	Vidayanes (88)	Tierra de Campos
Videmala	172	25,82	772			Videmala	Videmala (126) Villanueva de los Corchos (46)	Aliste
Villabrázaro	226	23,27	716			Villabrázaro	Villabrázaro (172) San Román del Valle (54)	Benavente y Los Valles
Villabuena del Puente	734	26,14	700			Villabuena del Puente	Villabuena del Puente (734)	La Guareña
Villadepera	221	30,11	718			Villadepera	Villadepera (221)	Sayago
Villaescusa	261	43,12	828			Villaescusa	Villaescusa (261)	La Guareña
Villafáfila	478	73,99	623			Villafáfila	Villafáfila (477) Otero de Sariegos (1)	Tierra de Campos
Villaferrueña	115	20,53	760			Villaferrueña	Villaferrueña (115)	Benavente y Los Valles
Villageriz	49	7,18	790			Villageriz	Villageriz (49)	Benavente y Los Valles
Villalazán	284	15,04	680			Villalazán	Villalazán (284)	Tierra del Vino
Villalba de la Lampreana	246	28,29	679			Villalba de la Lampreana	Villalba de la Lampreana (246)	Tierra de Campos
Villalcampo	471	64,95	782			Villalcampo	Villalcampo (333) Carbajosa (136) Salto de Villalcampo (2)	Aliste
Villalobos	255	43,20	720			Villalobos	Villalobos (255)	Tierra de Campos
Villalonso	96	14,89	724			Villalonso	Villalonso (96)	Alfoz de Toro
Villalpando	1528	126,92	690			Villalpando	Villalpando (1528)	Tierra de Campos
Villalube	169	39,95	698			Villalube	Villalube (169)	Alfoz de Toro
Villamayor de Campos	322	26,48	691			Villamayor de Campos	Villamayor de Campos (322)	Tierra de Campos
Villamor de los Escuderos	418	56,27	826			Villamor de los Escuderos	Villamor de los Escuderos (418)	La Guareña
Villanázar	289	18,39	706			Villanázar	Villanázar (80) Vecilla de Trasmonte (108) Mózar (101)	Benavente y Los Valles
Villanueva de Azoague	331	19,07	701			Villanueva de Azoague	Villanueva de Azoague (260) Castropepe (71)	Benavente y Los Valles
Villanueva de Campeán	122	12,04	766			Villanueva de Campeán	Villanueva de Campeán (122)	Tierra del Vino
Villanueva de las Peras	88	17,32	756			Villanueva de las Peras	Villanueva de las Peras (88)	Benavente y Los Valles
Villanueva del Campo	900	40,09	735			Villanueva del Campo	Villanueva del Campo (900)	Tierra de Campos
Villar de Fallaves	46	20,95	697			Villar de Fallaves	Villar de Fallaves (46)	Tierra de Campos
Villar del Buey	620	134,74	742			Villar del Buey	Villar del Buey (259) Formariz (103) Cibanal (83) Fornillos de Fermoselle (62) Pasariegos (59) Pinilla de Fermoselle (54)	Sayago
Villaralbo	1880	22,05	711			Villaralbo	Villaralbo (1880)	Tierra del Vino
Villardeciervos	450	85,55	863			Villardeciervos	Villardeciervos (405) Cional (45)	La Carballeda
Villardiegua de la Ribera	133	28,85	734			Villardiegua de la Ribera	Villardiegua de la Ribera (133)	Sayago
Villárdiga	84	16,90	682			Villárdiga	Villárdiga (84)	Tierra de Campos
Villardondiego	97	23,63	735			Villardondiego	Villardondiego (97)	Alfoz de Toro
Villarrín de Campos	425	50,90	690			Villarrín de Campos	Villarrín de Campos (425)	Tierra de Campos
Villaseco del Pan	249	34,56	757			Villaseco del Pan	Villaseco del Pan (249)	Tierra del Pan
Villavendimio	170	15.51	725			Villavendimio	Villavendimio (170)	Alfoz de Toro
Villaveza de Valverde	89	12.46	726			Villaveza de Valverde	Villaveza de Valverde (89)	Benavente y Los Valles
Villaveza del Agua	209	26,26	711			Villaveza del Agua	Villaveza del Agua (209)	Benavente y Los Valles
Viñas	199	40,13	784			Viñas	Viñas (105) Ribas (43) San Blas (35) Vega de Nuez (16)	Aliste
Zamora	63 217	149,28	652,6			Zamora	Zamora (63 086) Carrascal (131)	Tierra del Pan

== See also ==
- Geography of Spain
- List of cities in Spain
