= Justel, Spain =

Coordinates: 42°09′N 6°18′W

Justel
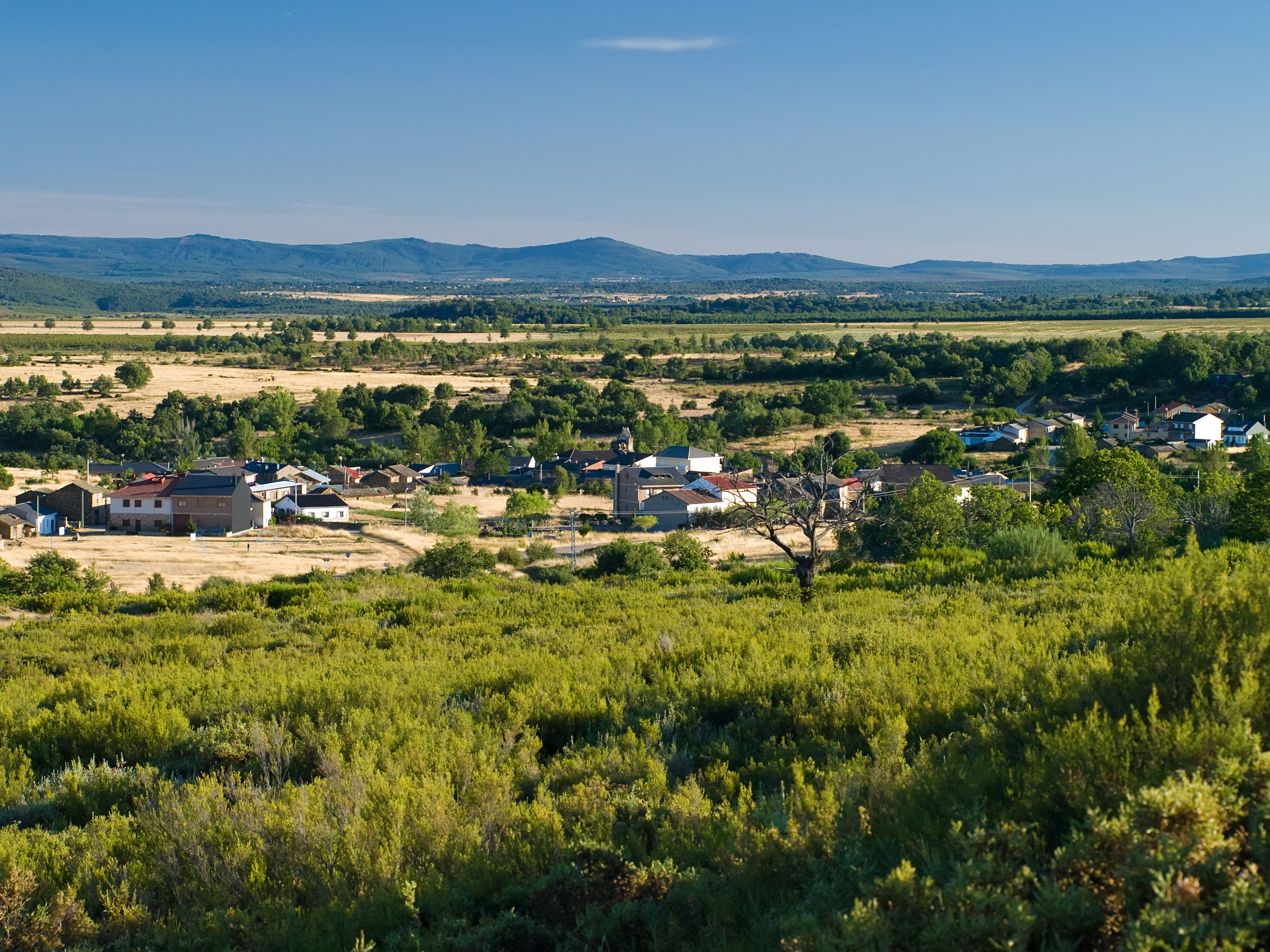
- View of Justel

- Flag Coat of arms
- Interactive map of Justel
- Country: Spain
- Autonomous community: Castile and León
- Province: Zamora
- Municipality: Justel

Area
  - Total: 51 km^{2} (20 sq mi)
- Elevation: 990 m (3,250 ft)

Population (2025-01-01)
  - Total: 75
  - Density: 1.5/km^{2} (3.8/sq mi)
- Time zone: UTC+1 (CET)
  - Summer (DST): UTC+2 (CEST)

Justel is a municipality located in the province of Zamora, Castile and León, Spain. According to the 2007 census the municipality has a population of 129 inhabitants. One of their main festivals celebrates the feast day of James the Greater.
