= Alcubilla de Nogales =

Place in Castile and León, Spain

Coordinates: 42°08′N 5°55′W

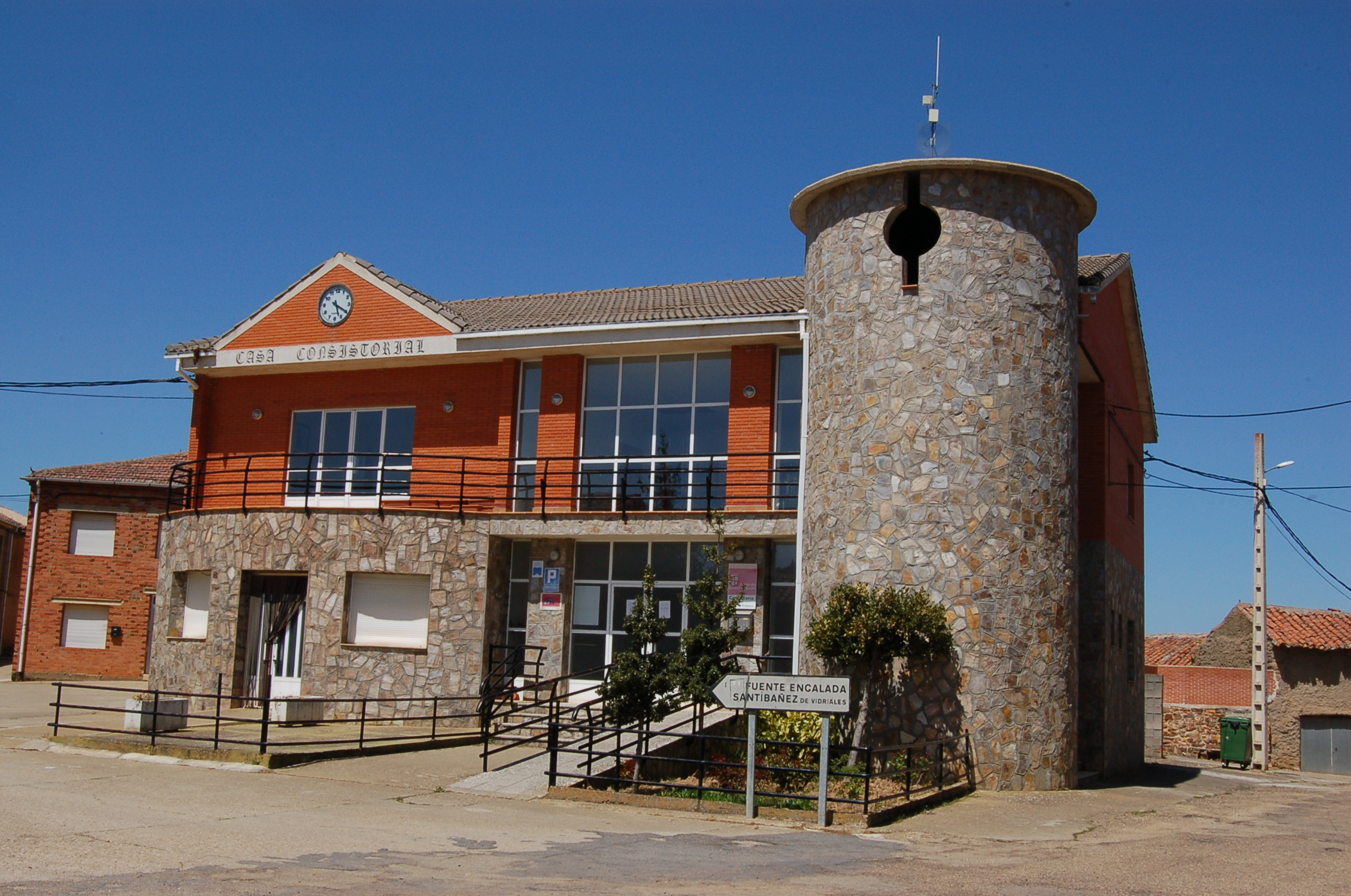
- Alcubilla de Nogales City Hall
- Interactive map of Alcubilla de Nogales
- Country: Spain
- Autonomous community: Castile and León
- Province: Zamora
- Municipality: Alcubilla de Nogales

Area
  - Total: 13 km^{2} (5.0 sq mi)

Population (2025-01-01)
  - Total: 108
  - Density: 8.3/km^{2} (22/sq mi)
- Time zone: UTC+1 (CET)
  - Summer (DST): UTC+2 (CEST)
- Website: Alcubilla de Nogales

Alcubilla de Nogales is a municipality located in the province of Zamora, Castile and León, Spain. According to the 2004 census (INE), the municipality has a population of 185 inhabitants.
