= Santa María de Valverde =

Coordinates: 41°56′N 5°56′W

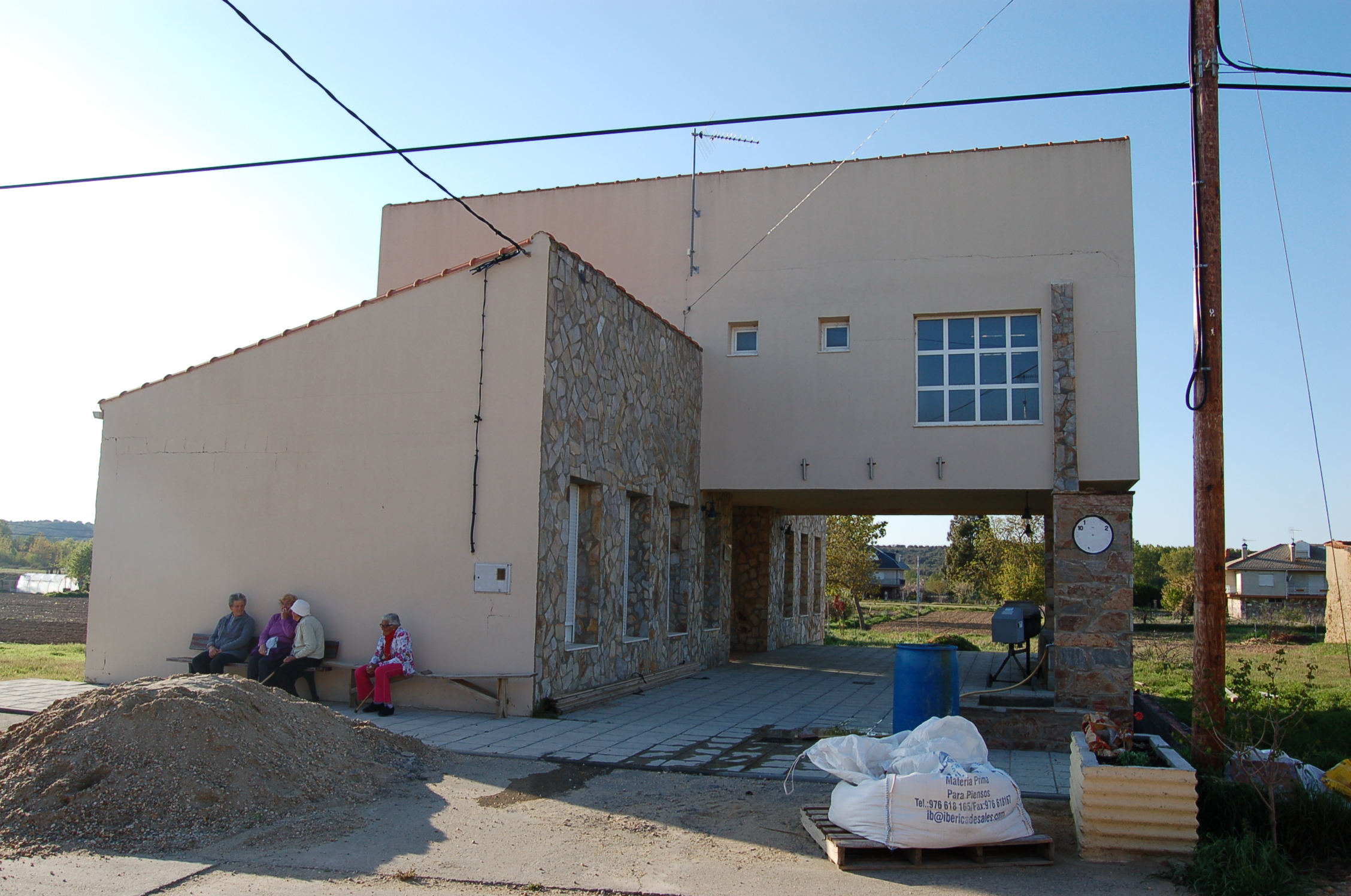
- Interactive map of Santa María de Valverde
- Country: Spain
- Autonomous community: Castile and León
- Province: Zamora
- Municipality: Santa María de Valverde

Area
  - Total: 9 km^{2} (3.5 sq mi)

Population (2025-01-01)
  - Total: 50
  - Density: 5.6/km^{2} (14/sq mi)
- Time zone: UTC+1 (CET)
  - Summer (DST): UTC+2 (CEST)

Santa María de Valverde is a municipality located in the province of Zamora, Castile and León, Spain. According to the 2004 census (INE), the municipality has a population of 95 inhabitants.
