= El Maderal =

Coordinates: 41°17′N 5°37′W

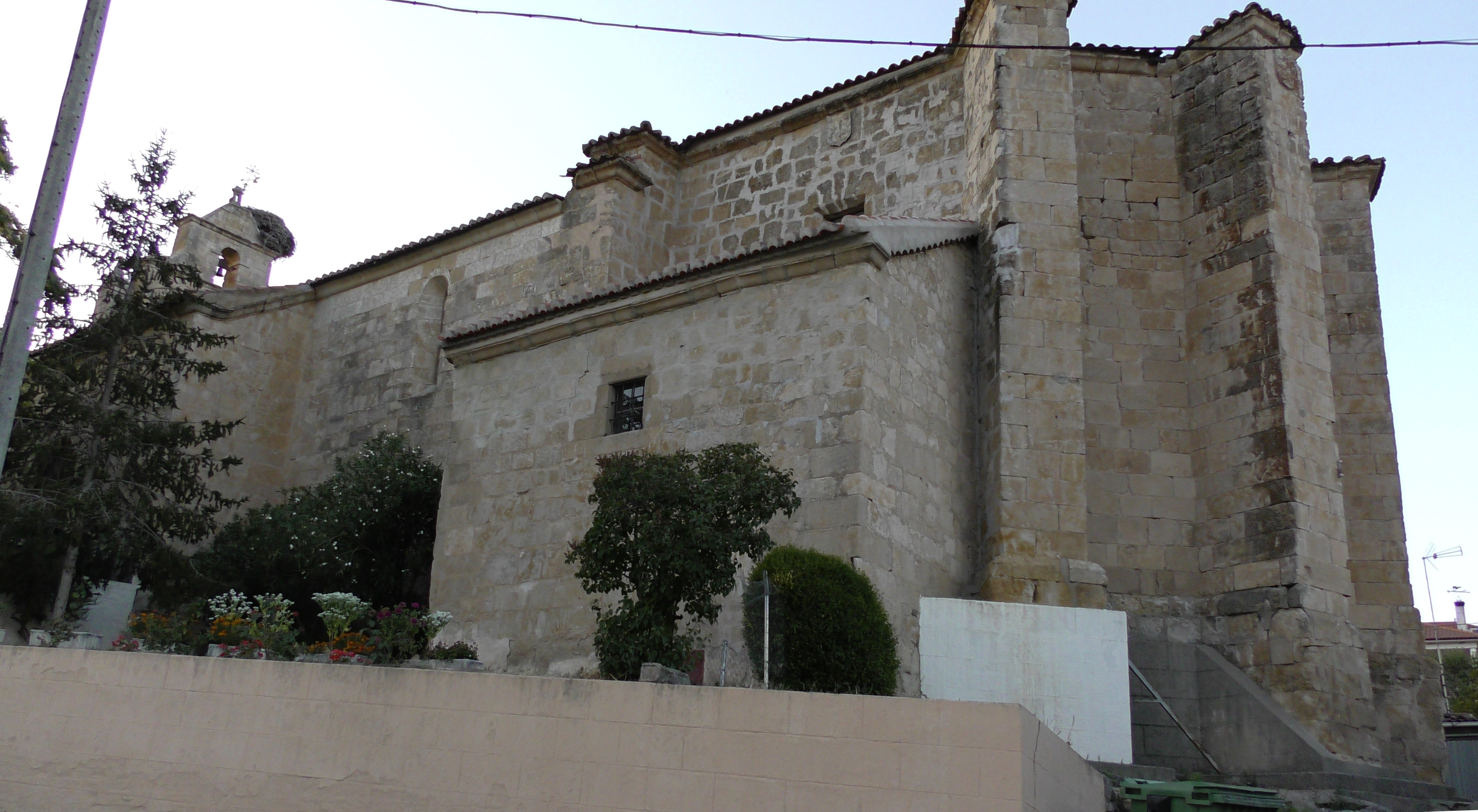
- Interactive map of El Maderal
- Country: Spain
- Autonomous community: Castile and León
- Province: Zamora
- Municipality: El Maderal

Area
  - Total: 29 km^{2} (11 sq mi)

Population (2025-01-01)
  - Total: 172
  - Density: 5.9/km^{2} (15/sq mi)
- Time zone: UTC+1 (CET)
  - Summer (DST): UTC+2 (CEST)

El Maderal is a municipality located in the province of Zamora, Castile and León, Spain. According to the 2004 census (INE), the municipality has a population of 269 inhabitants.
