= Peleas de Abajo =

Municipality in Castile and León, Spain

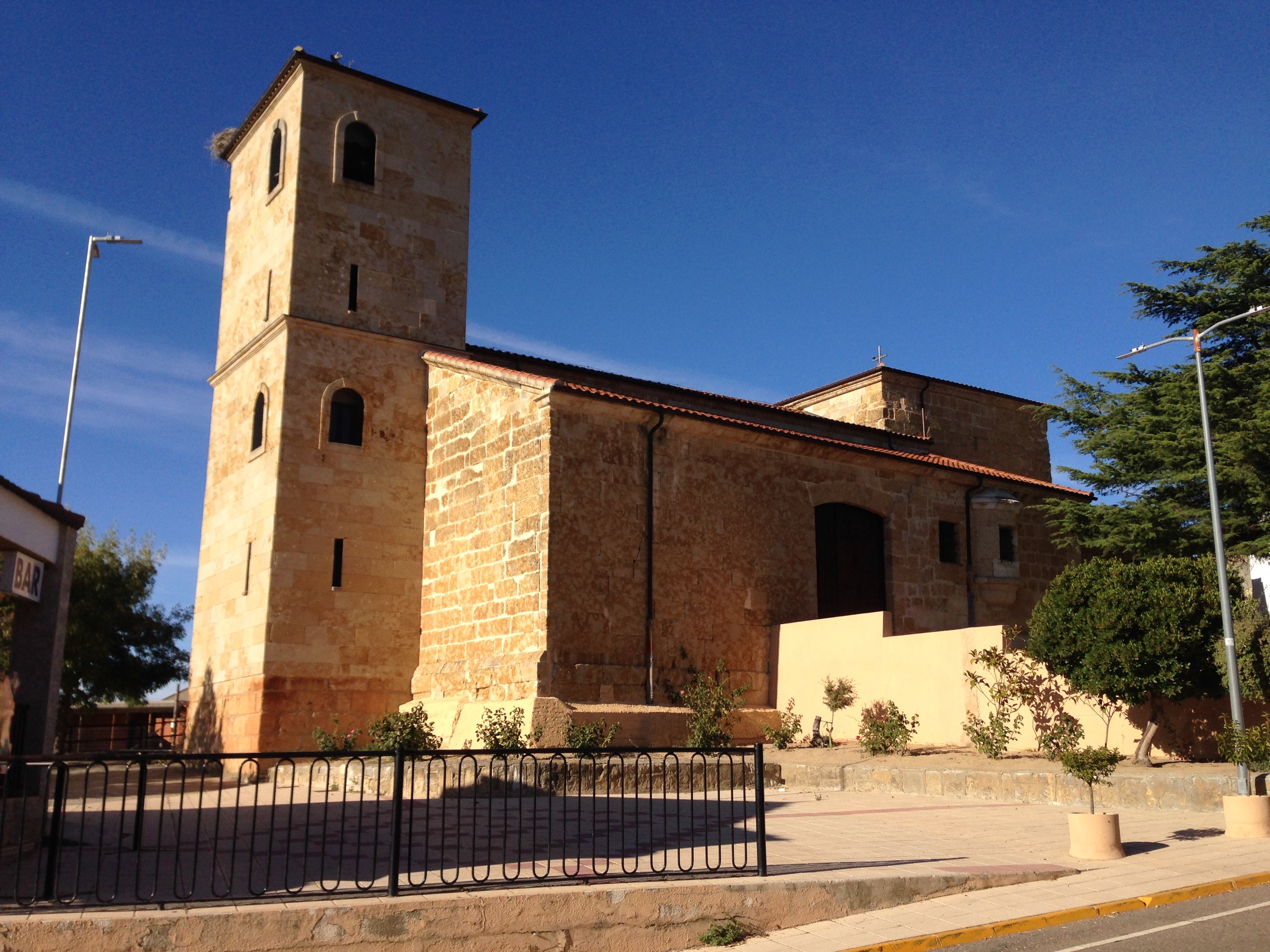

- Flag Coat of arms

- Location of Peleas of Abajo
- Coordinates: 41°23′33″N 5°41′22″W
- Country: Spain
- Autonomous community: Castile and León
- Province: Zamora
- Municipality: Peleas de Abajo

Area
  - Total: 12.01 km^{2} (4.64 sq mi)
- Elevation: 700 m (2,300 ft)

Population (2025-01-01)
  - Total: 248
  - Density: 20.6/km^{2} (53.5/sq mi)
- Time zone: UTC+1 (CET)
  - Summer (DST): UTC+2 (CEST)

Peleas de Abajo is a municipality located in the province of Zamora, Castile and León, Spain. According to the 2004 census (INE), the municipality had a population of 268 inhabitants.

Reportedly, the town has run into a terminal financial situation with an unbearable debt of 5.6 million dollars to banks and the central government, and so most local property has already been either 'confiscated or sold through auctioning' (August 2012).

== Heritage ==
The main point of interest is the parish church of Our Lady of the Assumption that belonged to the Knights Hospitaller. Romanesque, although finished between the sixteenth and seventeenth centuries, it is made of ashlar stone. It consists of two ships separated by pointed bent arches, decorated with vegetal paintings. In its interior, it emphasizes its baptismal font, and in its altarpiece counts on a niche in whose interior exists a crucifijo of century XVI. In the main chapel there is an altarpiece of the Virgen del Carmen, neoclassical style. The original tower was demolished and in its place a new stone lined was constructed.
