= Entrala =

Coordinates: 41°26′N 5°45′W

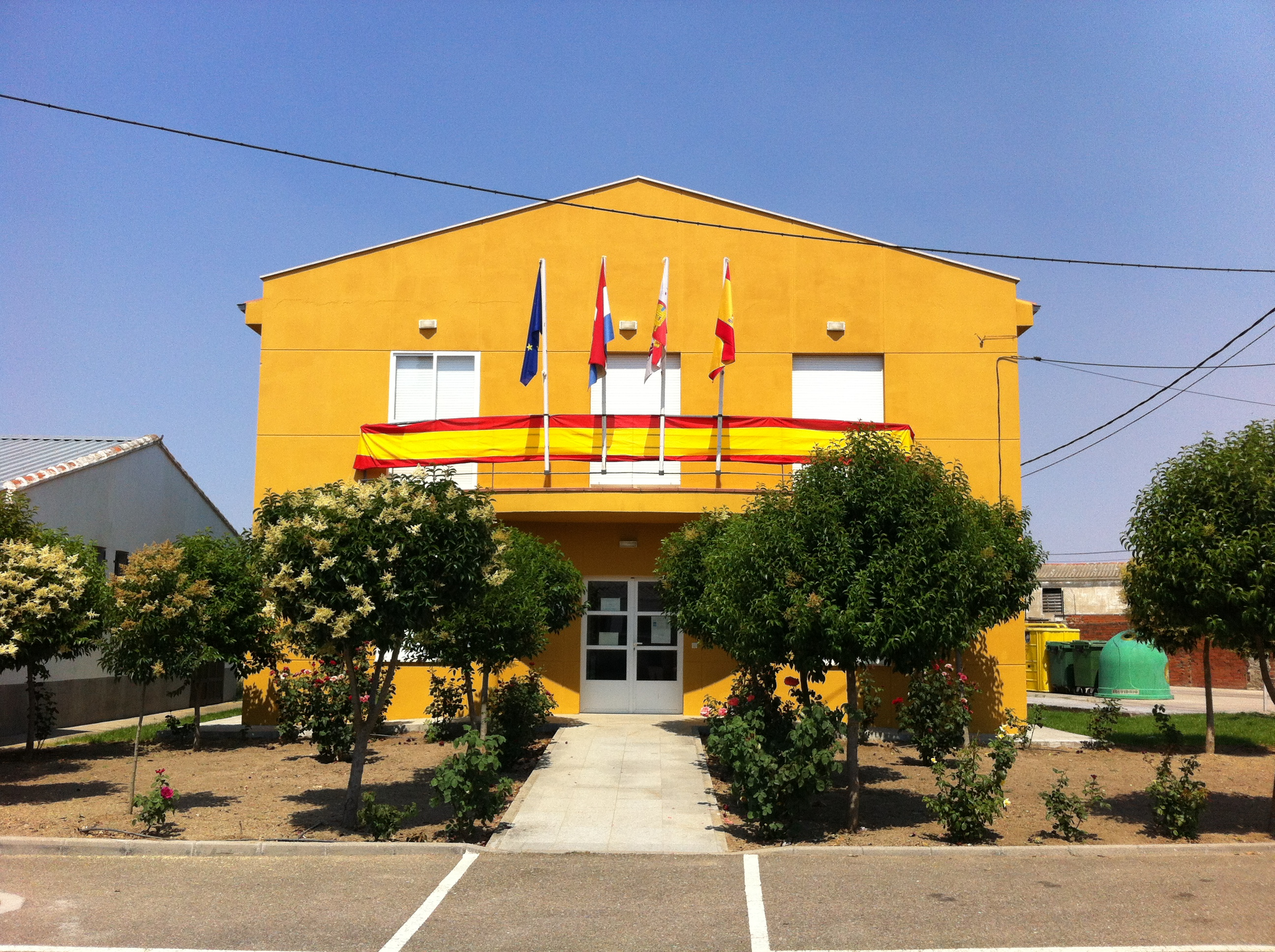

- Flag Coat of arms
- Interactive map of Entrala
- Country: Spain
- Autonomous community: Castile and León
- Province: Zamora
- Municipality: Entrala

Area
  - Total: 10 km^{2} (3.9 sq mi)

Population (2025-01-01)
  - Total: 133
  - Density: 13/km^{2} (34/sq mi)
- Time zone: UTC+1 (CET)
  - Summer (DST): UTC+2 (CEST)

Entrala is a municipality located in the province of Zamora, Castile and León, Spain. According to the 2009 census (INE), the municipality has a population of 162 inhabitants.
