= Fuentespreadas =

Coordinates: 41°19′N 5°37′W

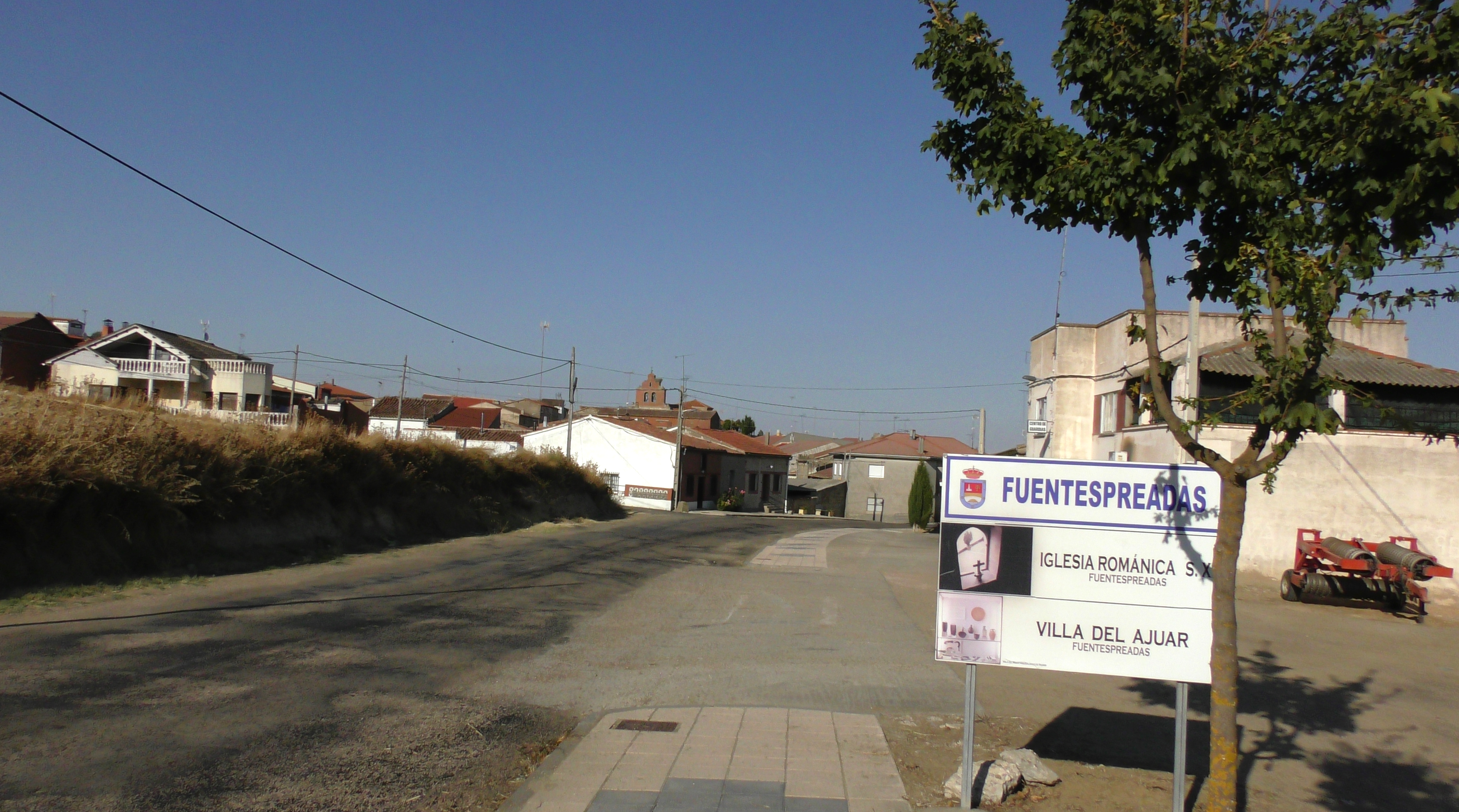
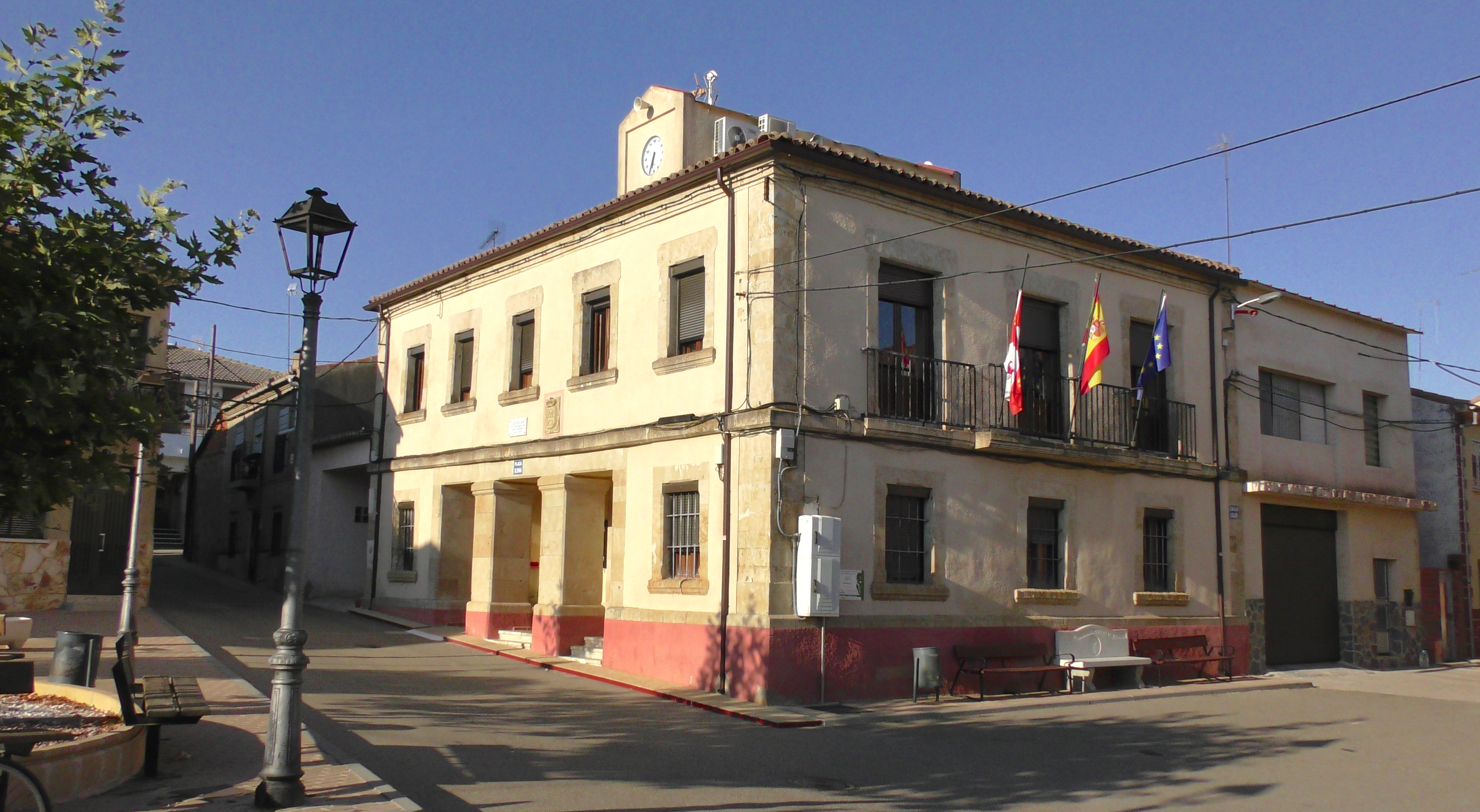
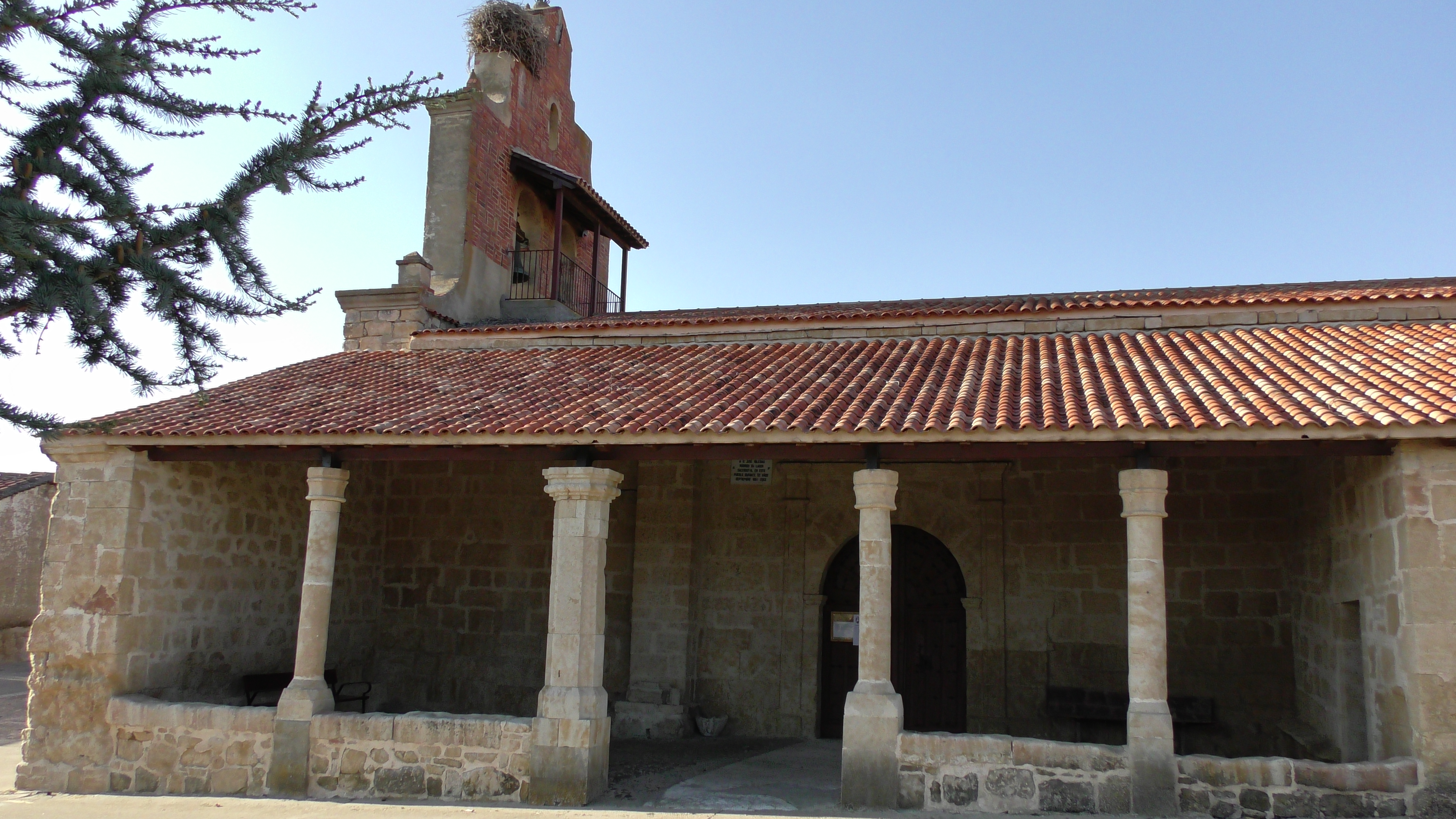
- Top down: View of Fuentespreadas, City Hall and parish church.

- Coat of arms
- Interactive map of Fuentespreadas
- Country: Spain
- Autonomous community: Castile and León
- Province: Zamora
- Municipality: Fuentespreadas

Area
  - Total: 19 km^{2} (7.3 sq mi)

Population (2025-01-01)
  - Total: 267
  - Density: 14/km^{2} (36/sq mi)
- Time zone: UTC+1 (CET)
  - Summer (DST): UTC+2 (CEST)

Fuentespreadas is a municipality located in the province of Zamora, Castile and León, Spain. According to the 2009 census (INE), the municipality has a population of 330 inhabitants.
