= Viñas =

- Municipality
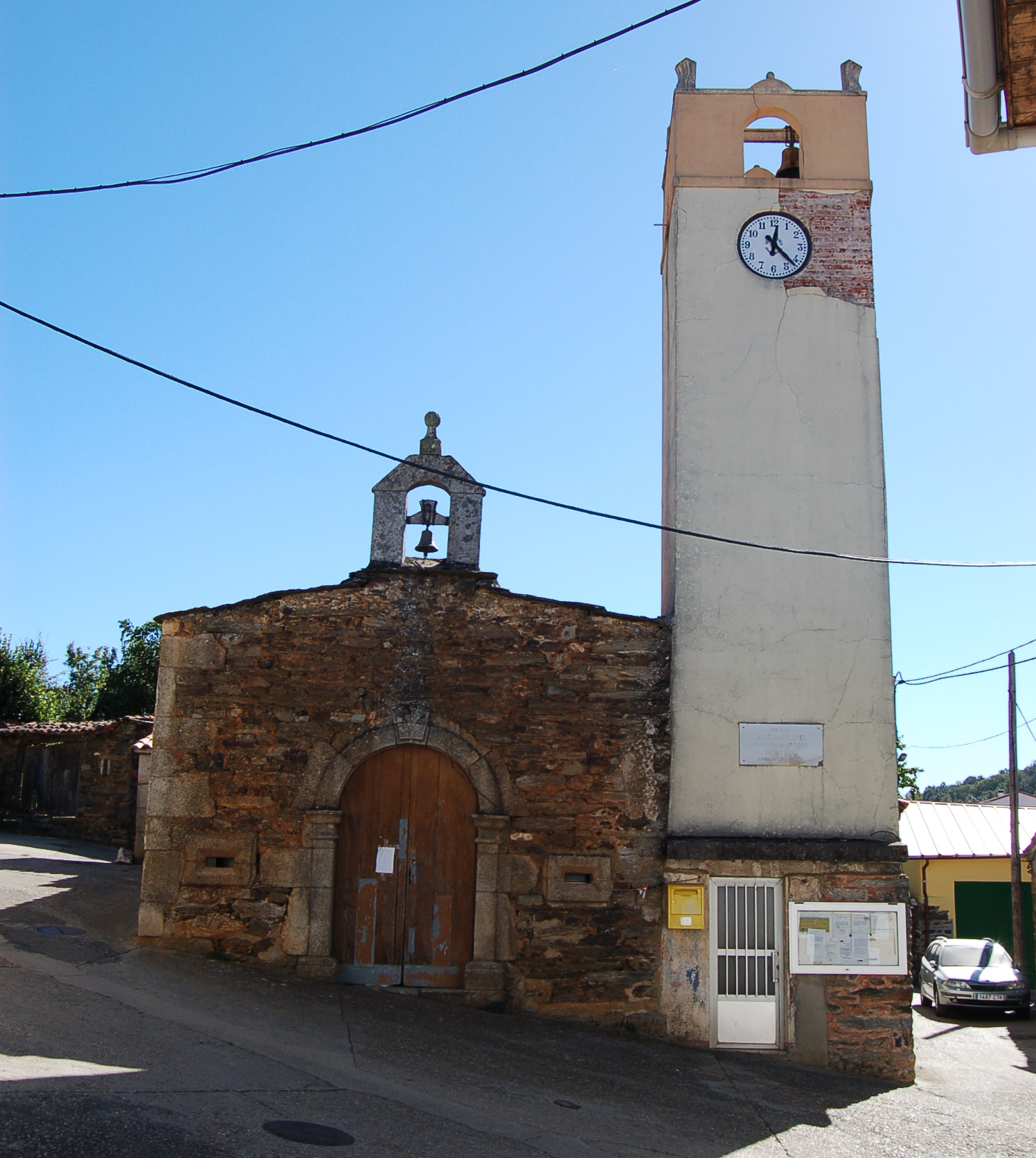

- Location in Spain
- Coordinates: 41.7731°N 6.4711°W
- Country: Spain
- Autonomous community: Castile and León
- Province: Zamora
- Municipality: Viñas

Area
  - Total: 40.13 km^{2} (15.49 sq mi)
- Elevation: 784 m (2,572 ft)

Population (2025-01-01)
  - Total: 148
  - Density: 3.69/km^{2} (9.55/sq mi)
- Time zone: UTC+1 (CET)
  - Summer (DST): UTC+2 (CEST)

Viñas is a municipality located in the province of Zamora, Castile and León, Spain. According to the 2004 census (INE), the municipality had a population of 259 inhabitants.

== Town hall ==
Viñas is home to the town hall of 4 villages:

- Viñas (84 inhabitants, INE 2020).
- Ribas (39 inhabitants, INE 2020).
- San Blas (31 inhabitants, INE 2020).
- Vega de Nuez (13 inhabitants, INE 2020).
