= Valdescorriel =

Coordinates: 42°01′N 5°30′W

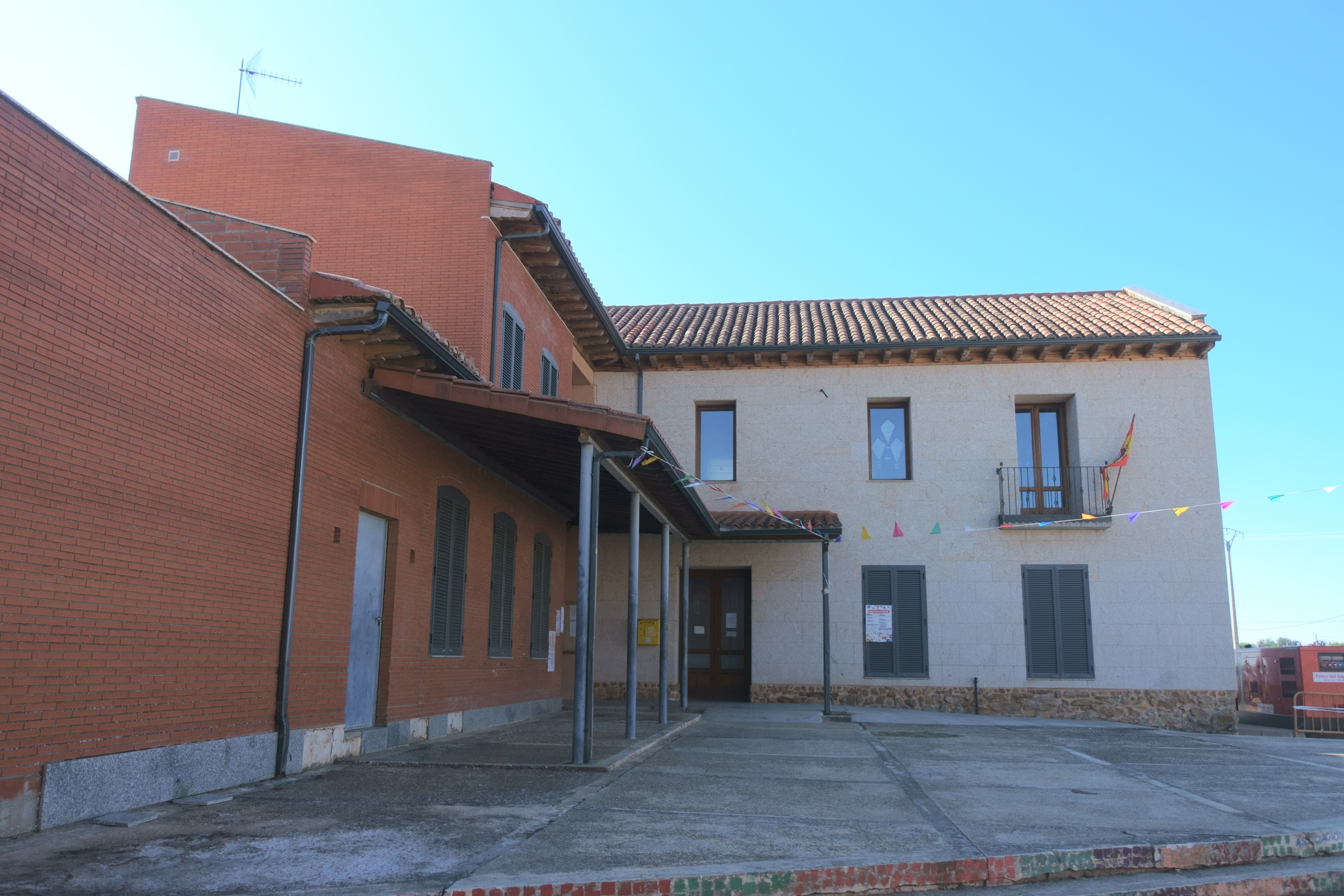

- Flag Coat of arms
- Interactive map of Valdescorriel
- Country: Spain
- Autonomous community: Castile and León
- Province: Zamora
- Municipality: Valdescorriel

Area
  - Total: 27 km^{2} (10 sq mi)

Population (2025-01-01)
  - Total: 131
  - Density: 4.9/km^{2} (13/sq mi)
- Time zone: UTC+1 (CET)
  - Summer (DST): UTC+2 (CEST)

Valdescorriel is a municipality located in the province of Zamora, Castile and León, Spain. According to the 2004 census (INE), the municipality has a population of 197 inhabitants.
