= Viñuela de Sayago =

- Location in Spain
- Coordinates: 41°14′50″N 5°57′28″W
- Country: Spain
- Autonomous community: Castile and León
- Province: Zamora
- Municipality: Alfaraz de Sayago

Population (2014)
  - Total: 57
- Time zone: UTC+1 (CET)
  - Summer (DST): UTC+2 (CEST)

Viñuela de Sayago is a locality in the municipality of Alfaraz de Sayago, province of Zamora, Castile and León, Spain. According to the 2014 census (INE), the locality has a population of 57 inhabitants.

== See also ==
- List of municipalities in Zamora
