= Villanueva de las Peras =

Coordinates: 41°56′N 5°58′W

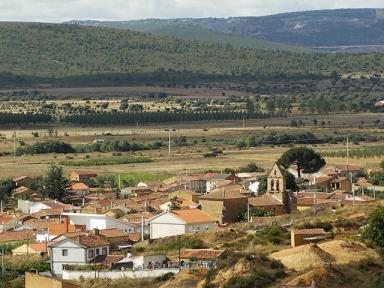
- Interactive map of Villanueva de las Peras
- Country: Spain
- Autonomous community: Castile and León
- Province: Zamora
- Municipality: Villanueva de las Peras

Area
  - Total: 17.32 km^{2} (6.69 sq mi)
- Elevation: 756 m (2,480 ft)

Population (2025-01-01)
  - Total: 85
  - Density: 4.9/km^{2} (13/sq mi)
- Time zone: UTC+1 (CET)
  - Summer (DST): UTC+2 (CEST)
- Website: http://villanuevadperas.eresmas.com/

Villanueva de las Peras (Spanish pronunciation: [biʎaˈnweβa ðe las ˈpeɾas]) is a municipality located in the province of Zamora, Castile and León, Spain. According to the 2007 census (INE), the municipality has a population of 147 inhabitants.
