= Villaveza de Valverde =

Place in Castile and León, Spain

Coordinates: 41°57′N 5°51′W

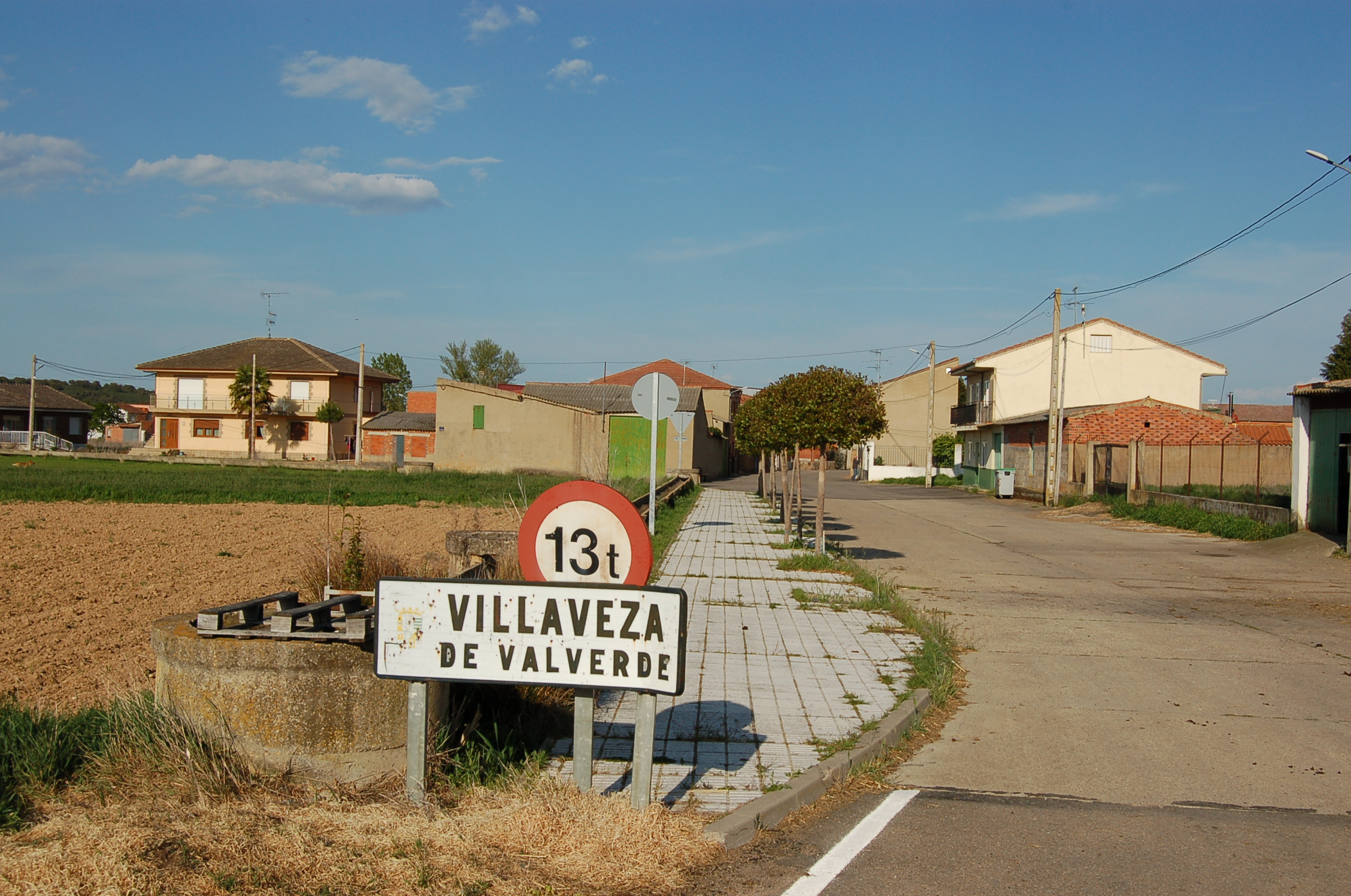
- Interactive map of Villaveza de Valverde
- Country: Spain
- Autonomous community: Castile and León
- Province: Zamora
- Municipality: Villaveza de Valverde

Area
  - Total: 12 km^{2} (4.6 sq mi)

Population (2025-01-01)
  - Total: 72
  - Density: 6.0/km^{2} (16/sq mi)
- Time zone: UTC+1 (CET)
  - Summer (DST): UTC+2 (CEST)

Villaveza de Valverde is a municipality located in the province of Zamora, Castile and León, Spain. According to the 2004 census (INE), the municipality has a population of 129 inhabitants.
