= Bretó =

Place in Castile and León, Spain

Coordinates: 41°53′N 5°44′W

Bretó de la Ribera
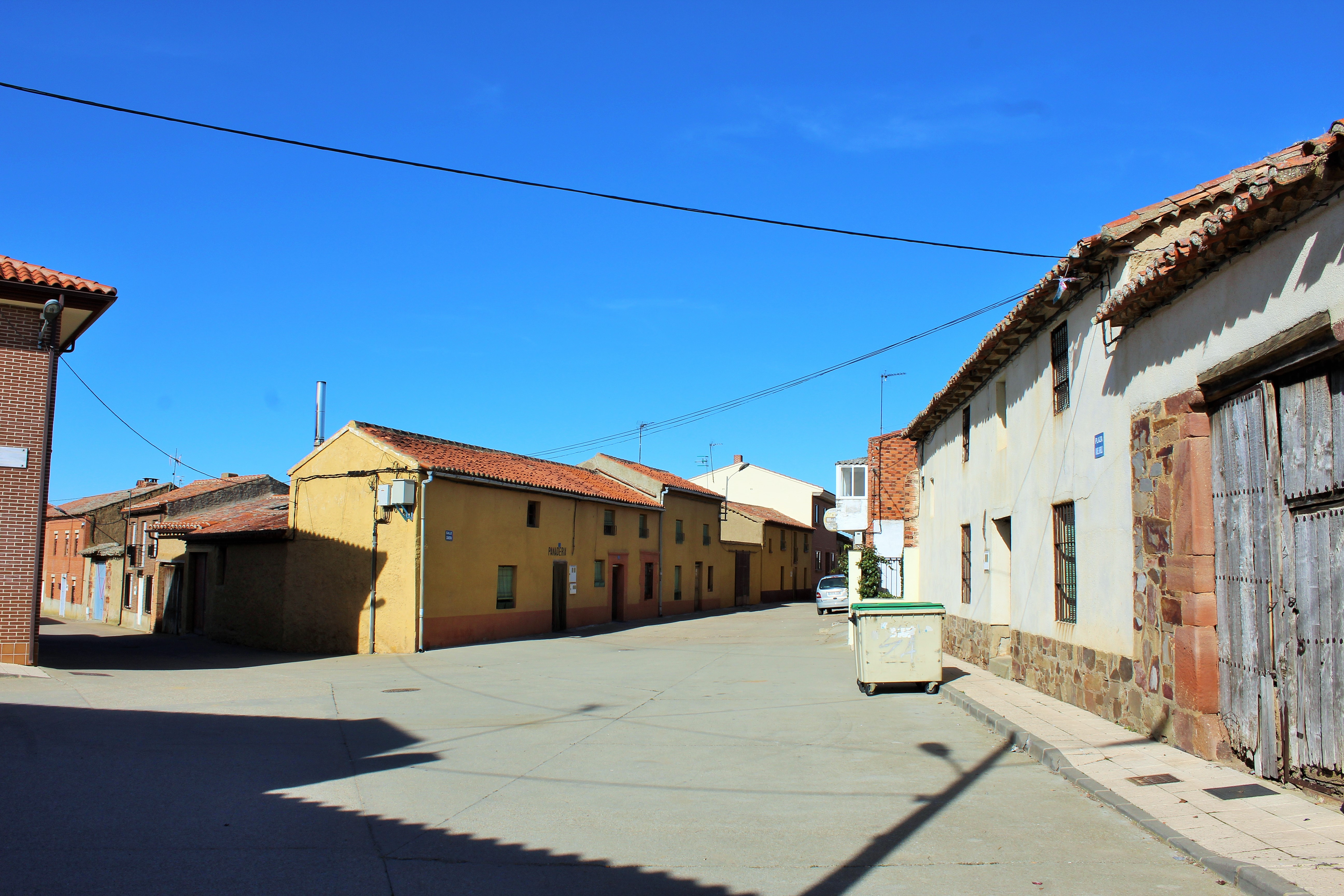

- Flag Coat of arms
- Interactive map of Bretó de la Ribera
- Country: Spain
- Autonomous community: Castile and León
- Province: Zamora
- Municipality: Bretó de la Ribera

Area
  - Total: 21 km^{2} (8.1 sq mi)

Population (2025-01-01)
  - Total: 163
  - Density: 7.8/km^{2} (20/sq mi)
- Time zone: UTC+1 (CET)
  - Summer (DST): UTC+2 (CEST)
- Website: Bretó de la Ribera

Bretó is a municipality located in the province of Zamora, Castilla y León, Spain. According to the 2009 census (INE), the municipality has a population of 212 inhabitants.

Breto became part of the province of Zamora in 1833 when the provinces were restructured and acquired their modern borders. In 1884 Bretó was integrated into the judicial district of Benavente.
