= Cuelgamures =

Coordinates: 41°18′N 5°39′W

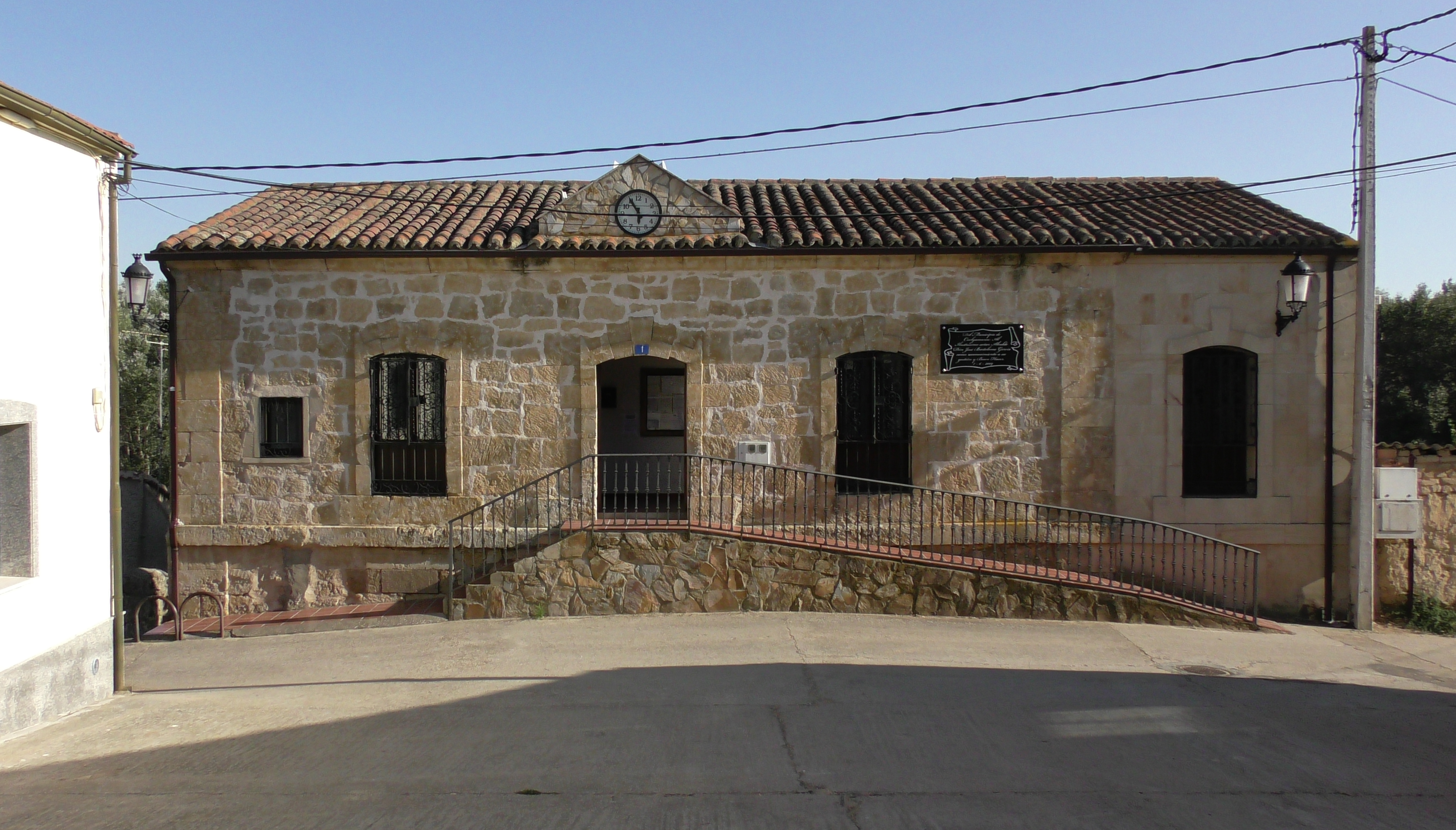
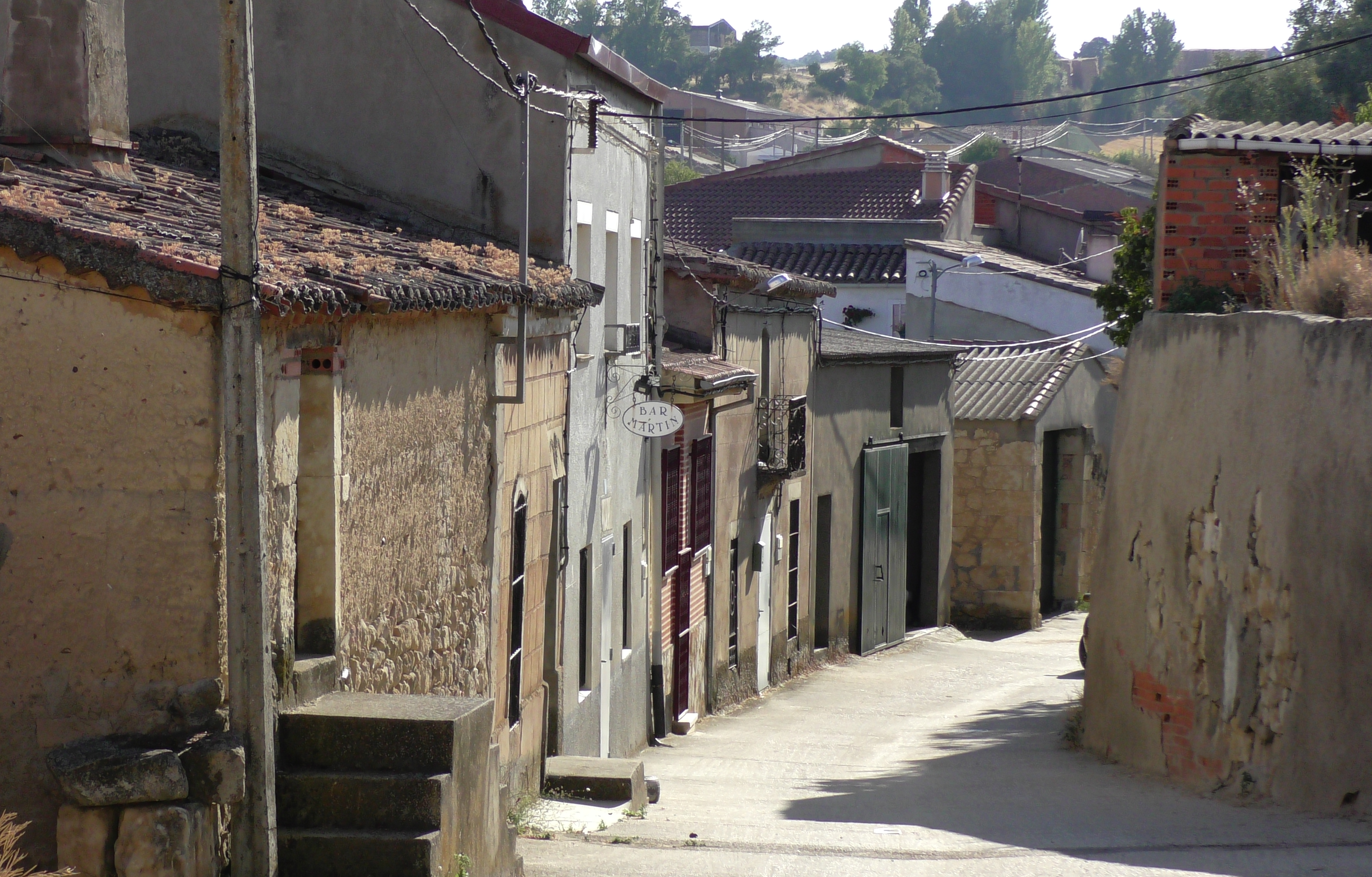
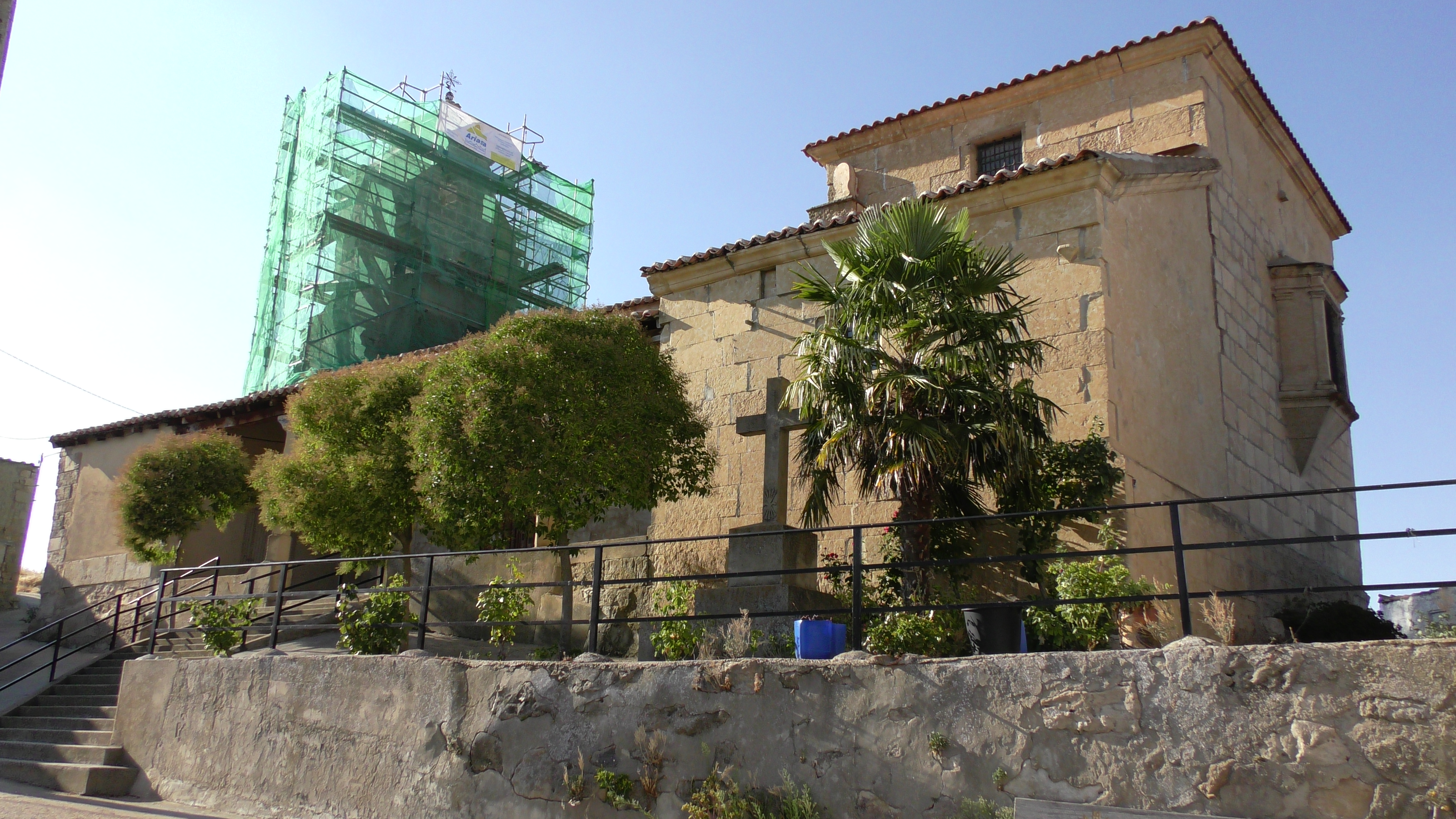
- Top down: City Hall, España Street and church of Santa María Magdalena.
- Interactive map of Cuelgamures
- Country: Spain
- Autonomous community: Castile and León
- Province: Zamora
- Municipality: Cuelgamures

Area
  - Total: 14 km^{2} (5.4 sq mi)

Population (2025-01-01)
  - Total: 77
  - Density: 5.5/km^{2} (14/sq mi)
- Time zone: UTC+1 (CET)
  - Summer (DST): UTC+2 (CEST)

Cuelgamures is a municipality located in the province of Zamora, Castile and León, Spain. According to the 2019 census (INE), the municipality has a population of 85 inhabitants.
