= Valdefinjas =

Coordinates: 41°27′N 5°27′W

- Municipality
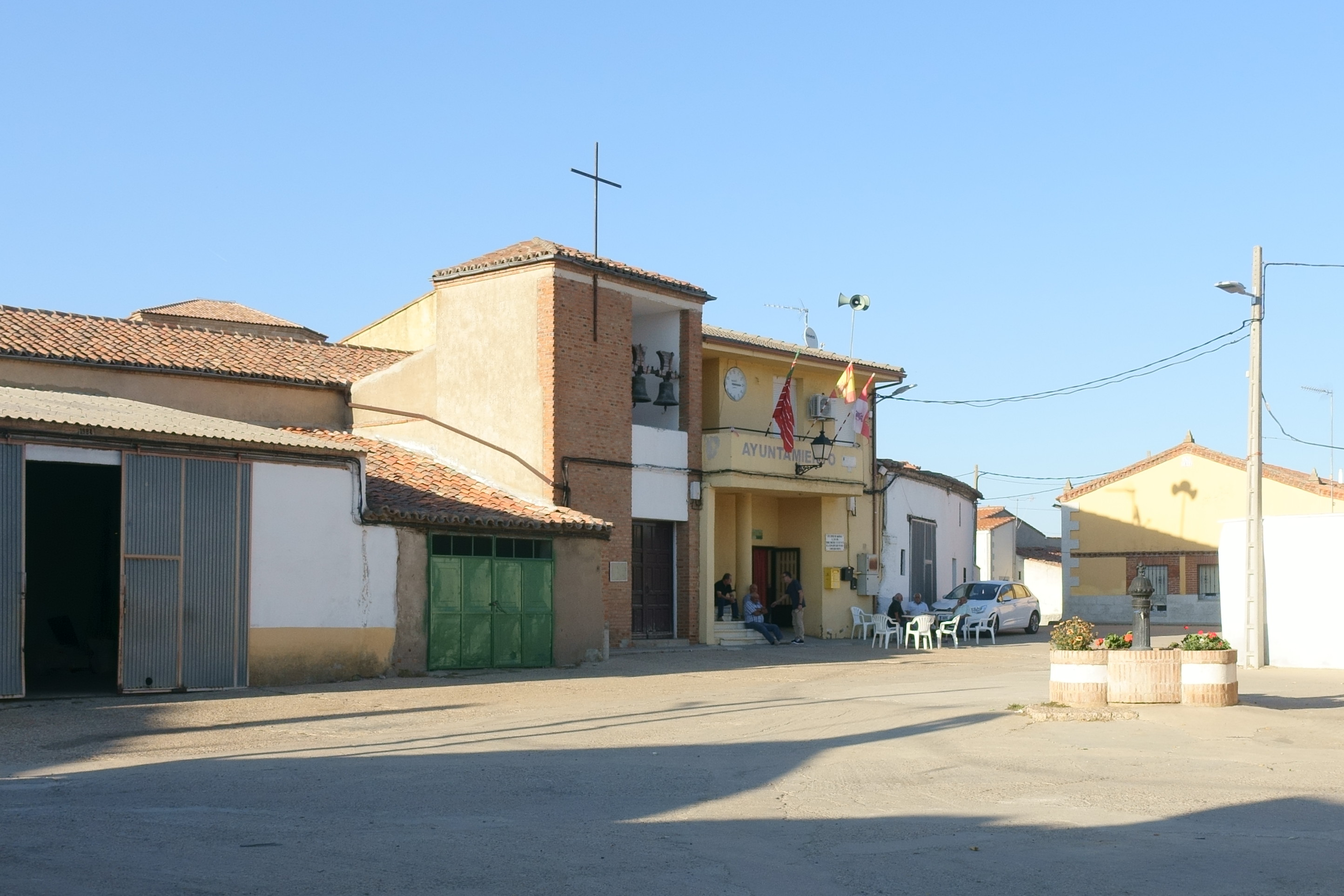
- Interactive map of Valdefinjas
- Country: Spain
- Autonomous community: Castile and León
- Province: Zamora
- Municipality: Valdefinjas

Area
  - Total: 16 km^{2} (6.2 sq mi)

Population (2025-01-01)
  - Total: 60
  - Density: 3.8/km^{2} (9.7/sq mi)
- Time zone: UTC+1 (CET)
  - Summer (DST): UTC+2 (CEST)

Valdefinjas is a municipality located in the province of Zamora, Castile and León, Spain. According to the 2004 census (INE), the municipality has a population of 93 inhabitants.
