= Villavendimio =

Place in Castile and León, Spain

Coordinates: 41°35′N 5°20′W

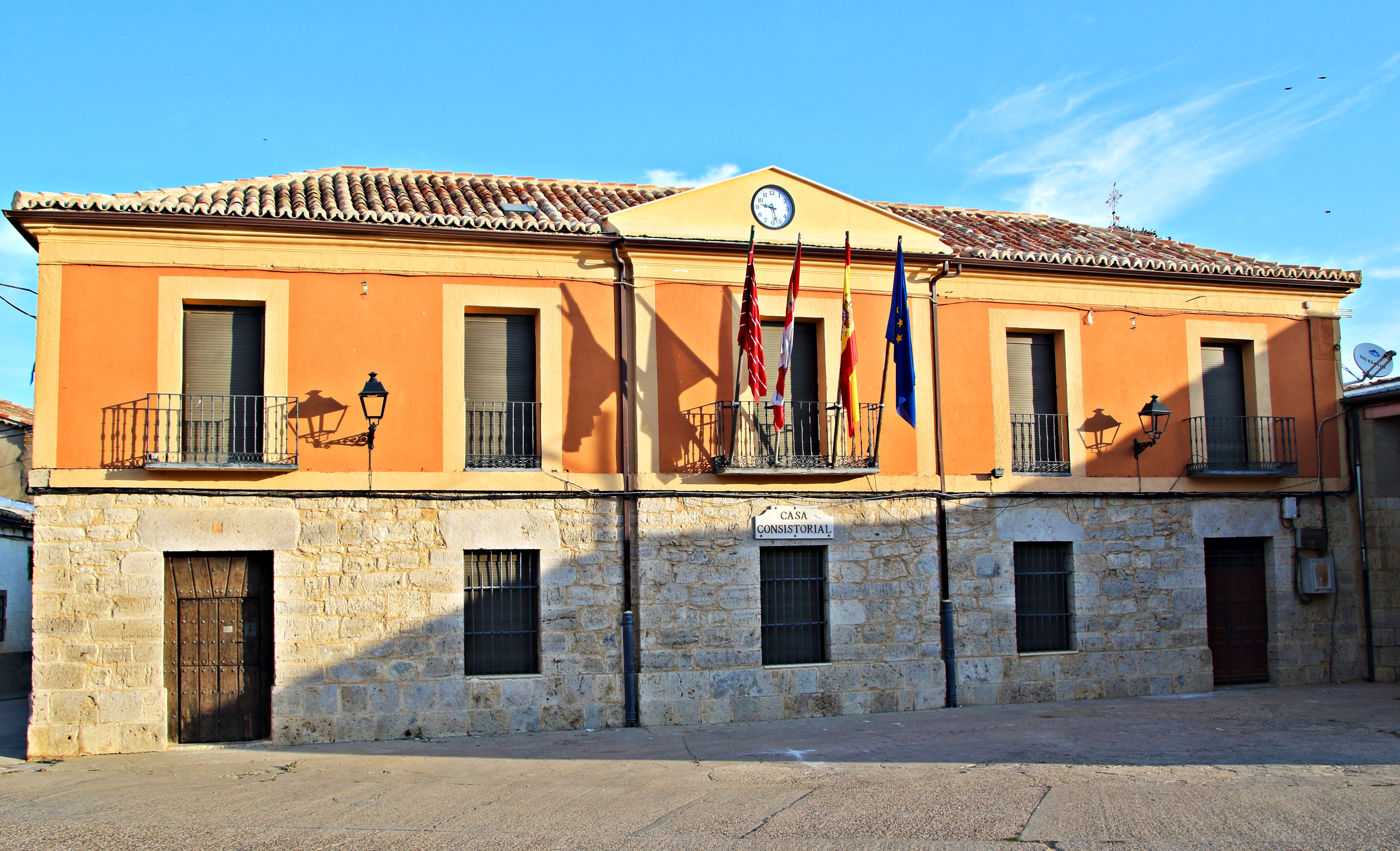
- Villavendimio City Hall

- Coat of arms
- Interactive map of Villavendimio
- Country: Spain
- Autonomous community: Castile and León
- Province: Zamora
- Municipality: Villavendimio

Area
  - Total: 15 km^{2} (5.8 sq mi)

Population (2025-01-01)
  - Total: 150
  - Density: 10/km^{2} (26/sq mi)
- Time zone: UTC+1 (CET)
  - Summer (DST): UTC+2 (CEST)

Villavendimio is a municipality located in the province of Zamora, Castile and León, Spain. According to the 2009 census (INE), the municipality has a population of 209 inhabitants.
