= El Pego =

Coordinates: 41°20′N 5°28′W

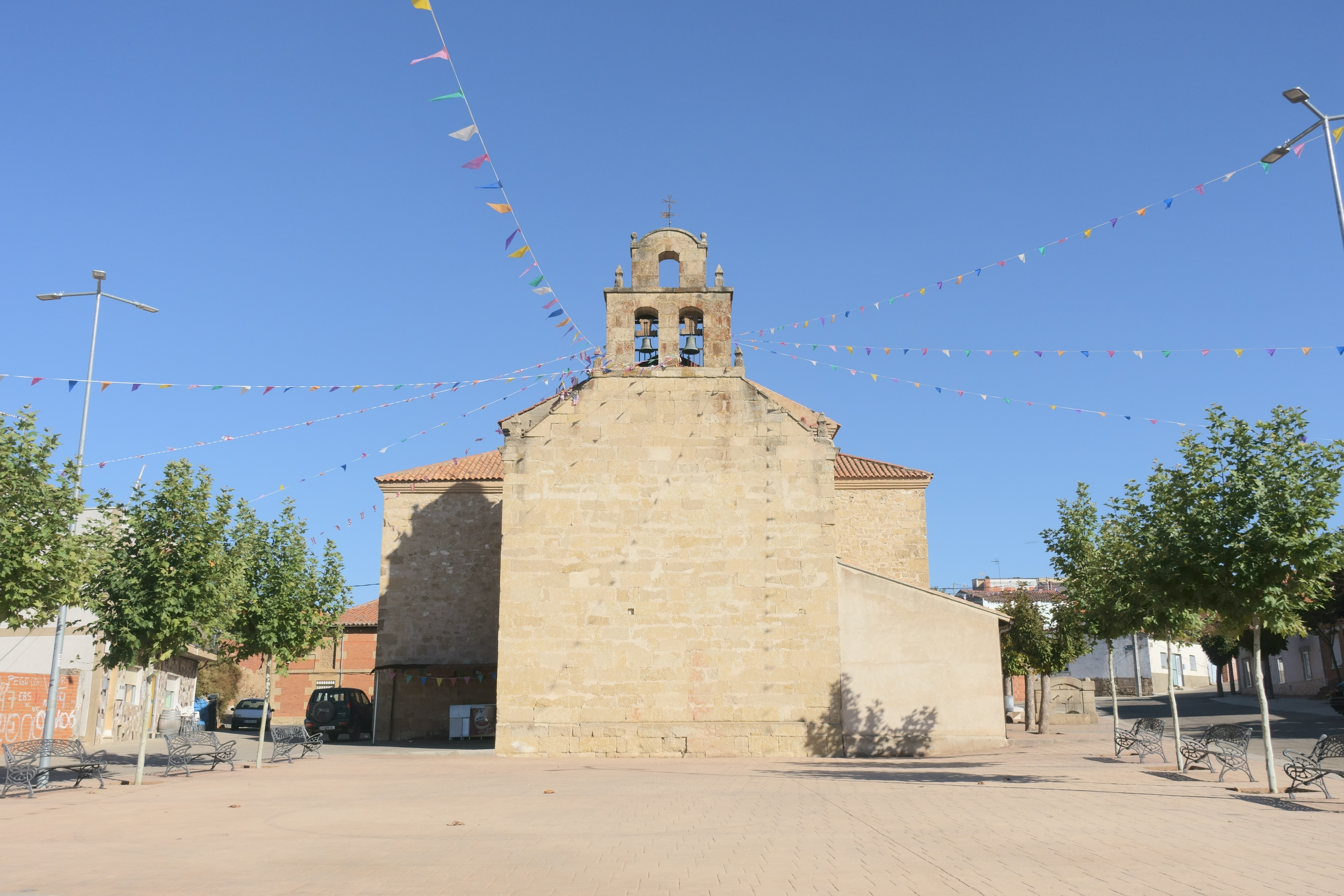
- Interactive map of El Pego
- Country: Spain
- Autonomous community: Castile and León
- Province: Zamora
- Municipality: El Pego

Area
  - Total: 26 km^{2} (10 sq mi)

Population (2025-01-01)
  - Total: 268
  - Density: 10/km^{2} (27/sq mi)
- Time zone: UTC+1 (CET)
  - Summer (DST): UTC+2 (CEST)
- Website: www.aytoelpego.com

El Pego is a municipality located in the province of Zamora, Castile and León, Spain. According to the 2004 census (INE), the municipality has a population of 413 inhabitants.
