= Vegalatrave =

Coordinates: 41°42′N 6°06′W

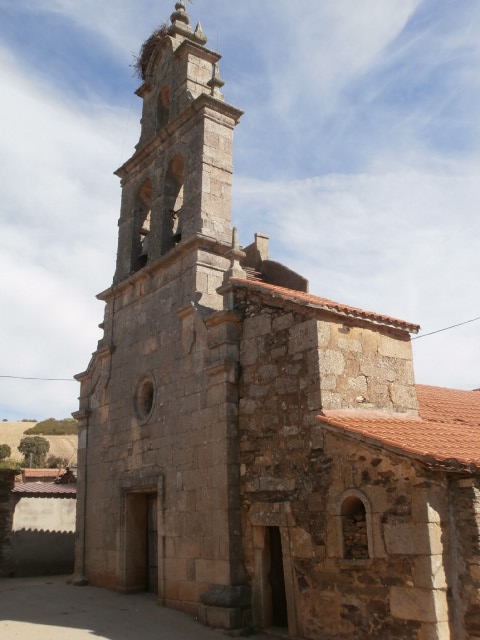
- Interactive map of Vegalatrave
- Country: Spain
- Autonomous community: Castile and León
- Province: Zamora
- Municipality: Vegalatrave

Area
  - Total: 18 km^{2} (6.9 sq mi)

Population (2025-01-01)
  - Total: 79
  - Density: 4.4/km^{2} (11/sq mi)
- Time zone: UTC+1 (CET)
  - Summer (DST): UTC+2 (CEST)

Vegalatrave is a municipality located in the province of Zamora, Castile and León, Spain. According to the 2004 census (INE), the municipality has a population of 141 inhabitants.
