= Villamor de los Escuderos =

Coordinates: 41°15′N 5°34′W

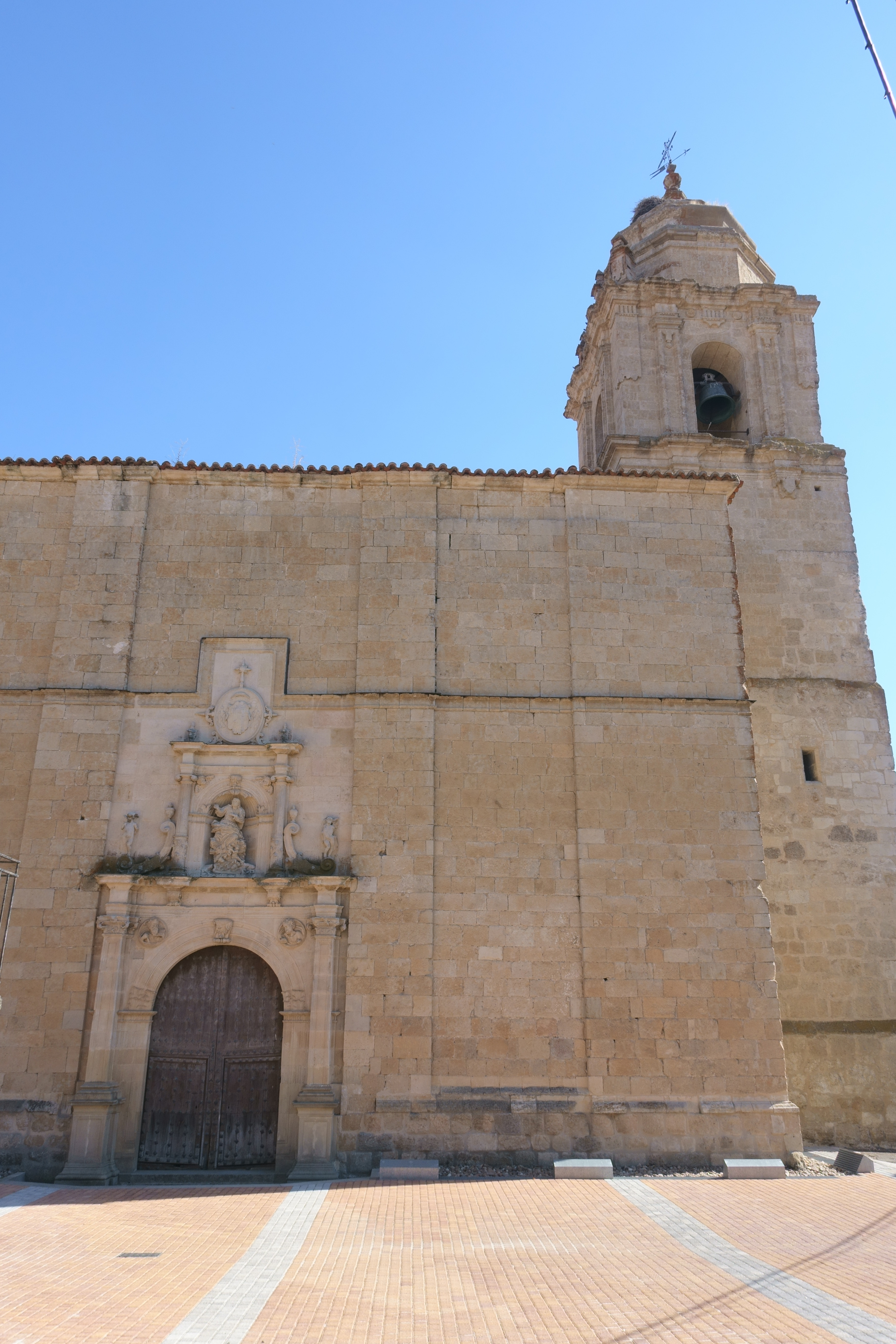
- Interactive map of Villamor de los Escuderos
- Country: Spain
- Autonomous community: Castile and León
- Province: Zamora
- Municipality: Villamor de los Escuderos

Area
  - Total: 56 km^{2} (22 sq mi)

Population (2025-01-01)
  - Total: 362
  - Density: 6.5/km^{2} (17/sq mi)
- Time zone: UTC+1 (CET)
  - Summer (DST): UTC+2 (CEST)

Villamor de los Escuderos is a municipality located in the province of Zamora, Castile and León, Spain. According to the 2004 census (INE), the municipality has a population of 561 inhabitants.
