= Robleda-Cervantes =

Coordinates: 42°05′N 6°35′W

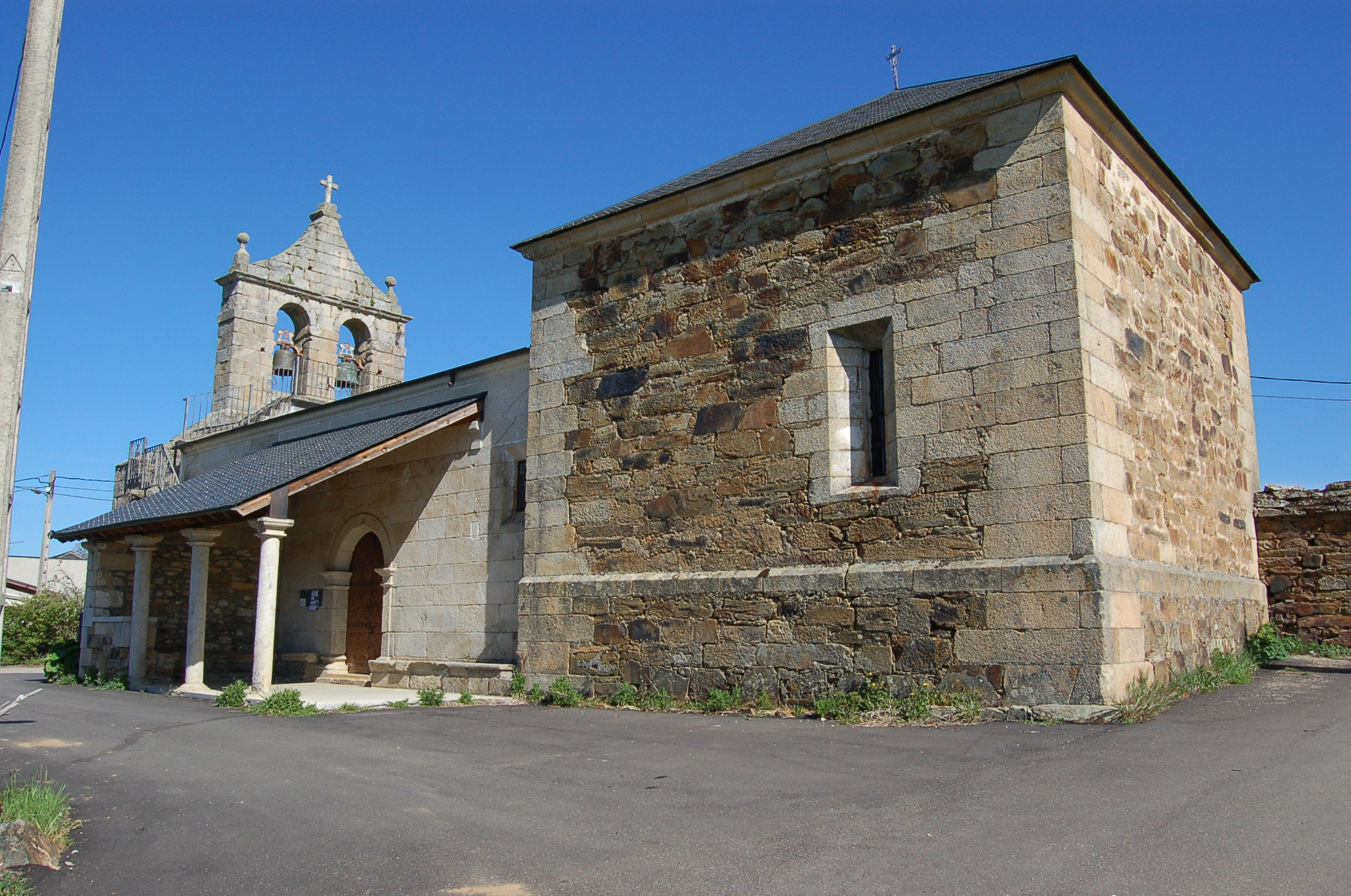

- Flag Coat of arms
- Interactive map of Robleda-Cervantes
- Country: Spain
- Autonomous community: Castile and León
- Province: Zamora
- Municipality: Robleda-Cervantes

Area
  - Total: 32 km^{2} (12 sq mi)

Population (2025-01-01)
  - Total: 375
  - Density: 12/km^{2} (30/sq mi)
- Time zone: UTC+1 (CET)
  - Summer (DST): UTC+2 (CEST)

Robleda-Cervantes is a municipality located in the province of Zamora, Castile and León, Spain. According to the 2004 census (INE), the municipality has a population of 476 inhabitants.

On 27 June 1916 the municipality changed its name from Robleda to Robleda-Cervantes.
