= La Torre del Valle =

Coordinates: 42°06′N 5°43′W

La Torre del Valle, Spain
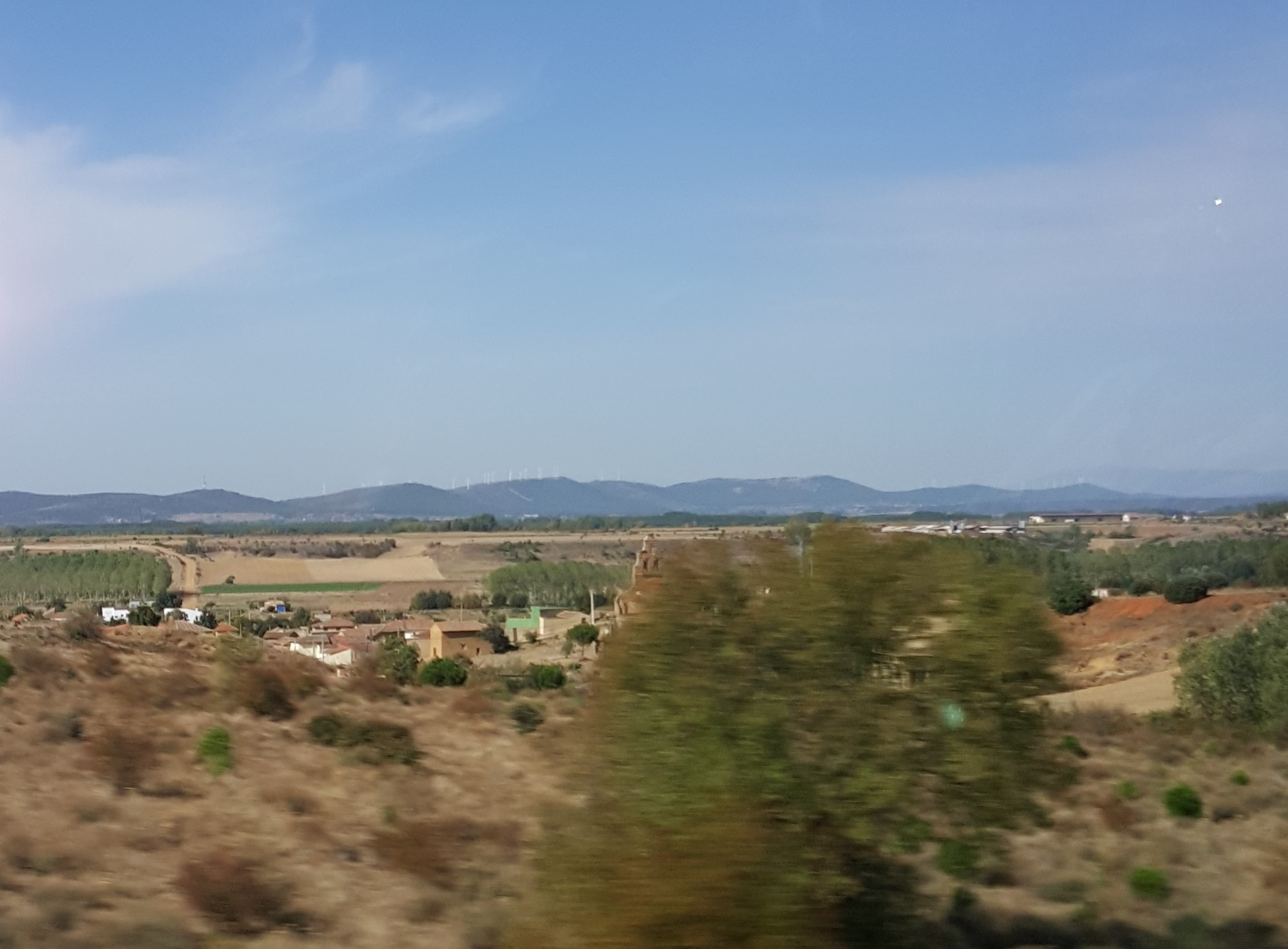
- Interactive map of La Torre del Valle, Spain
- Country: Spain
- Autonomous community: Castile and León
- Province: Zamora
- Municipality: La Torre del Valle

Area
  - Total: 16 km^{2} (6.2 sq mi)

Population (2025-01-01)
  - Total: 122
  - Density: 7.6/km^{2} (20/sq mi)
- Time zone: UTC+1 (CET)
  - Summer (DST): UTC+2 (CEST)
- Website: Official website

La Torre del Valle is a municipality located in the province of Zamora, Castile and León, Spain. According to the 2004 census (INE), the municipality has a population of 185 inhabitants.
