= Vadillo de la Guareña =

- Municipality
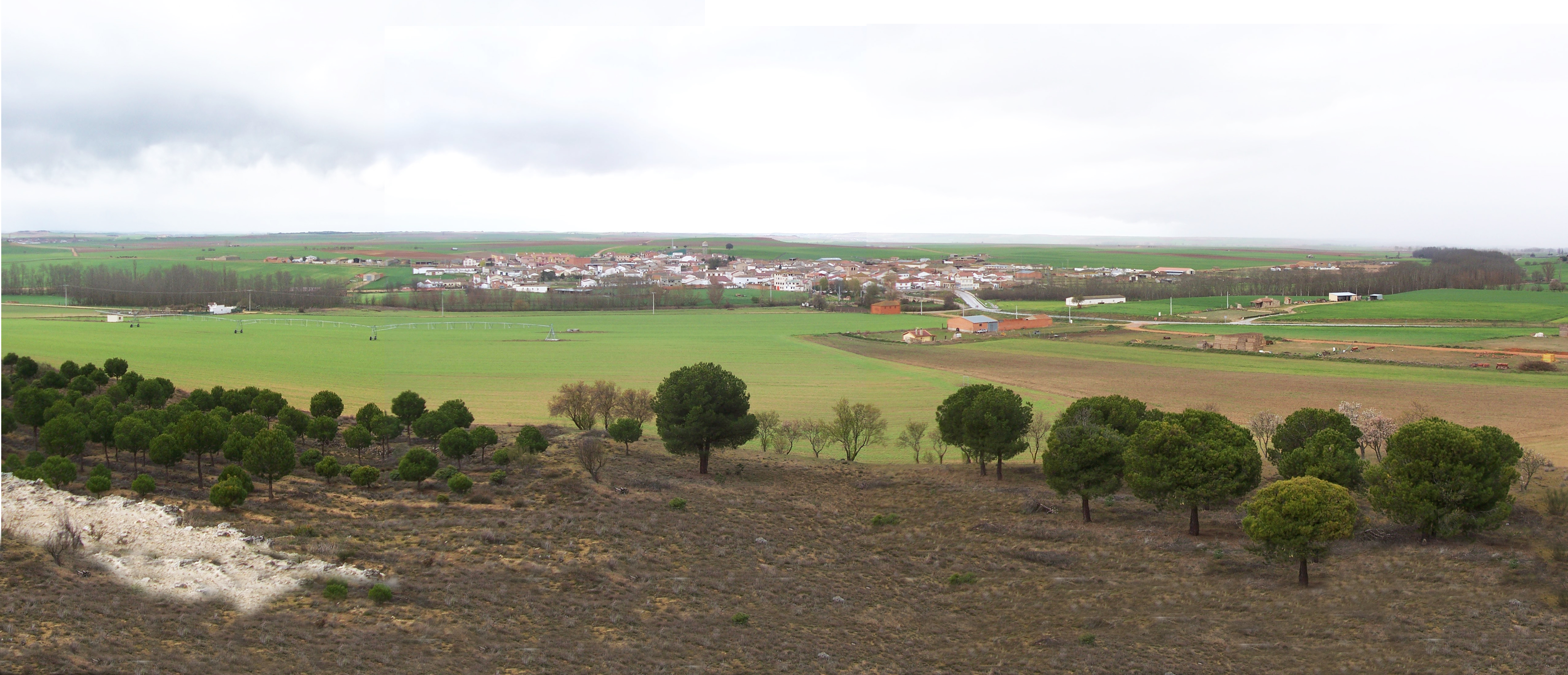
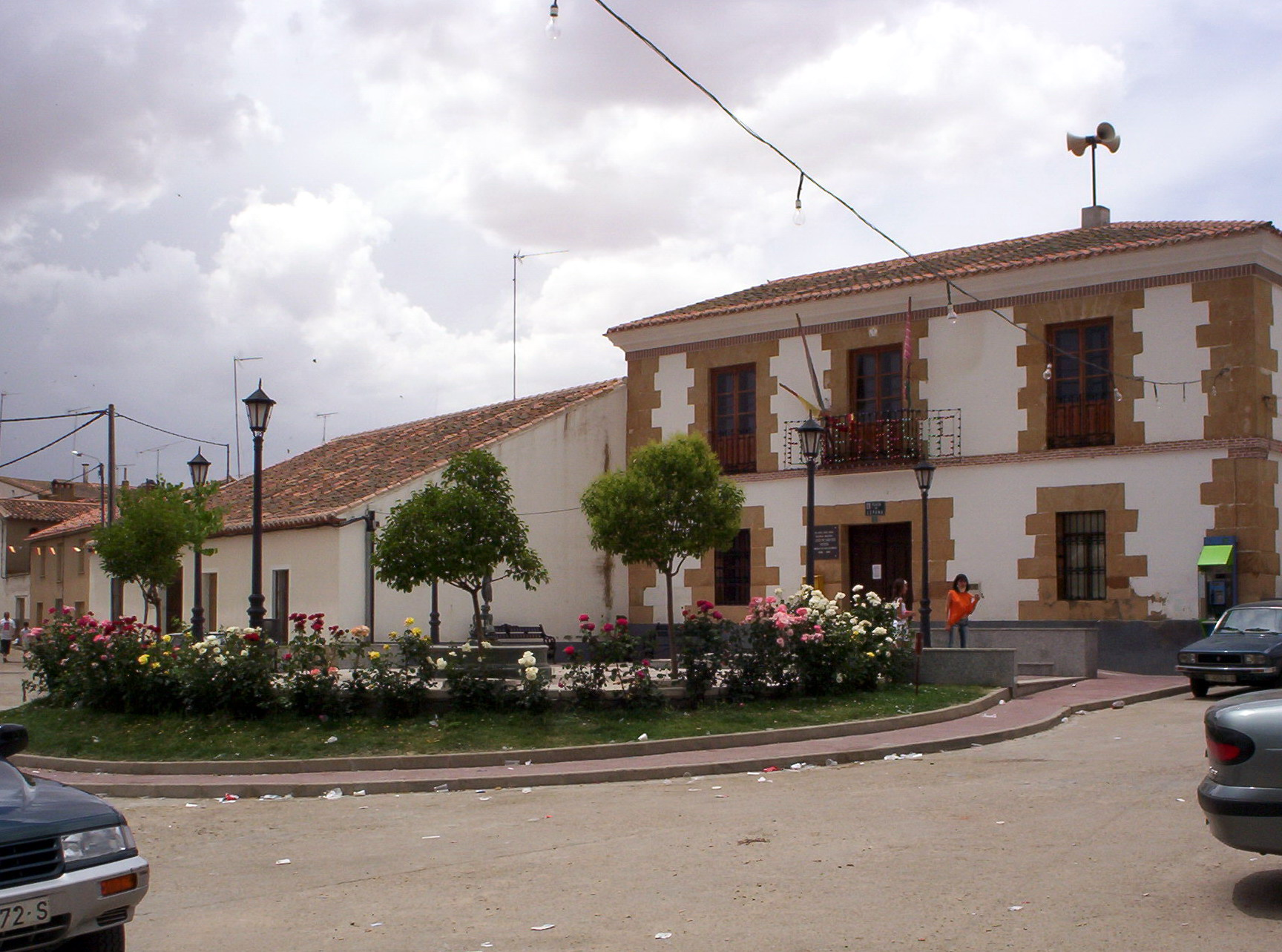
- Views of Vadillo de la Guareña. Town square.

- Coat of arms

- Spain
- Coordinates: 41°16′55″N 5°21′10″W
- Country: Spain
- Autonomous community: Castile and León
- Province: Zamora
- Comarca: La Guareña

Government
  - Mayor: Fernando Javier Ruíz Martín

Area
  - Total: 44 km^{2} (17 sq mi)
- Elevation: 713 m (2,339 ft)

Population (2025-01-01)
  - Total: 240
  - Density: 5.5/km^{2} (14/sq mi)
- Time zone: UTC+1 (CET)
  - Summer (DST): UTC+2 (CEST)

Vadillo de la Guareña is a municipality located in the province of Zamora, Castile and León, Spain.
