= Villabuena del Puente =

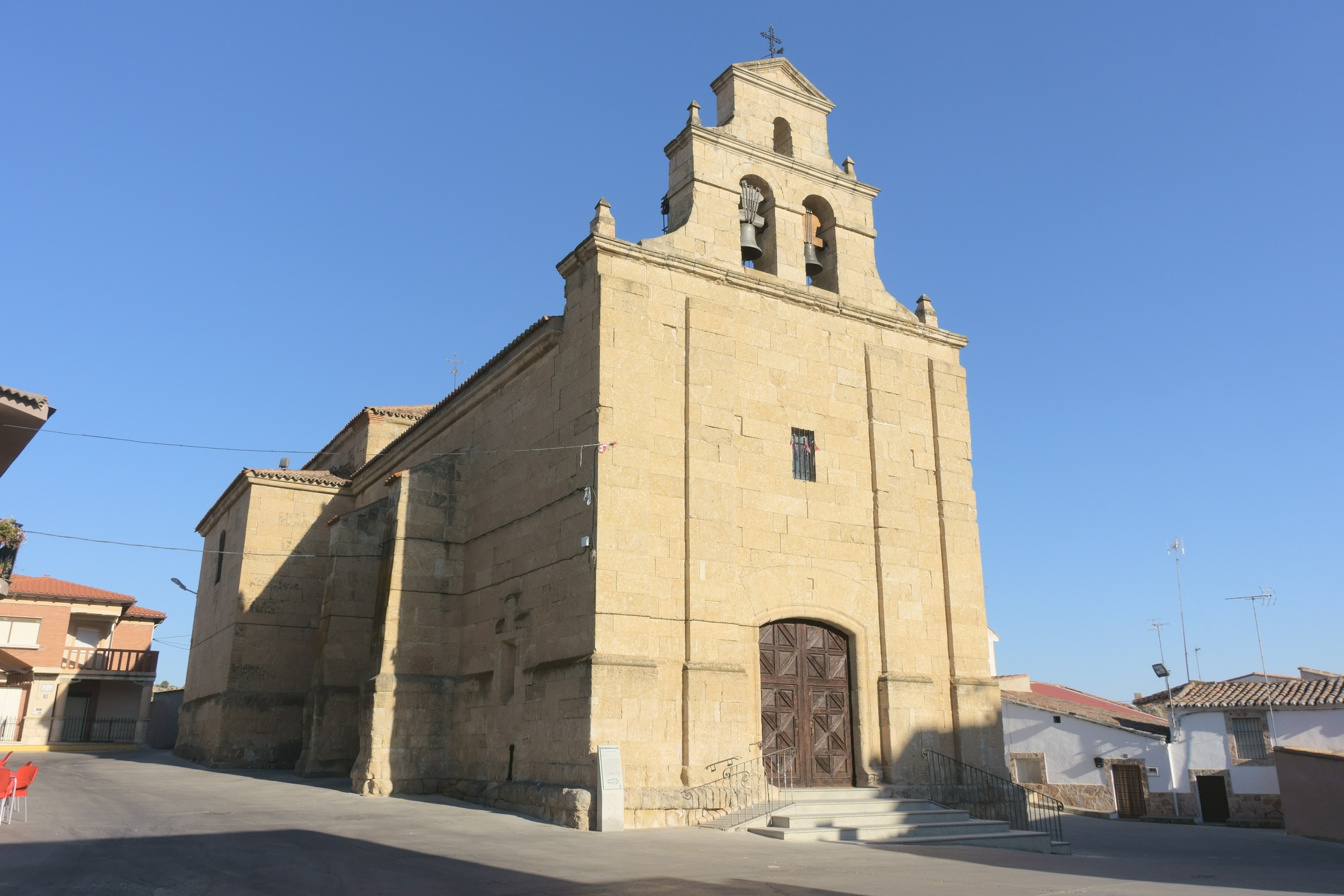

- Flag Coat of arms

- Spain
- Coordinates: 41°22′51″N 5°24′24″W
- Country: Spain
- Autonomous community: Castile and León
- Province: Zamora
- Comarca: La Guareña

Government
  - Mayor: Juan Manuel Martín González

Area
  - Total: 26.14 km^{2} (10.09 sq mi)
- Elevation: 700 m (2,300 ft)

Population (2025-01-01)
  - Total: 574
  - Density: 22.0/km^{2} (56.9/sq mi)
- Demonym: Villabuenenses
- Time zone: UTC+1 (CET)
  - Summer (DST): UTC+2 (CEST)
- Website: Official website

Villabuena del Puente is a municipality located in the province of Zamora, Castile and León, Spain.
