= Argujillo =

Place in Castile and León, Spain

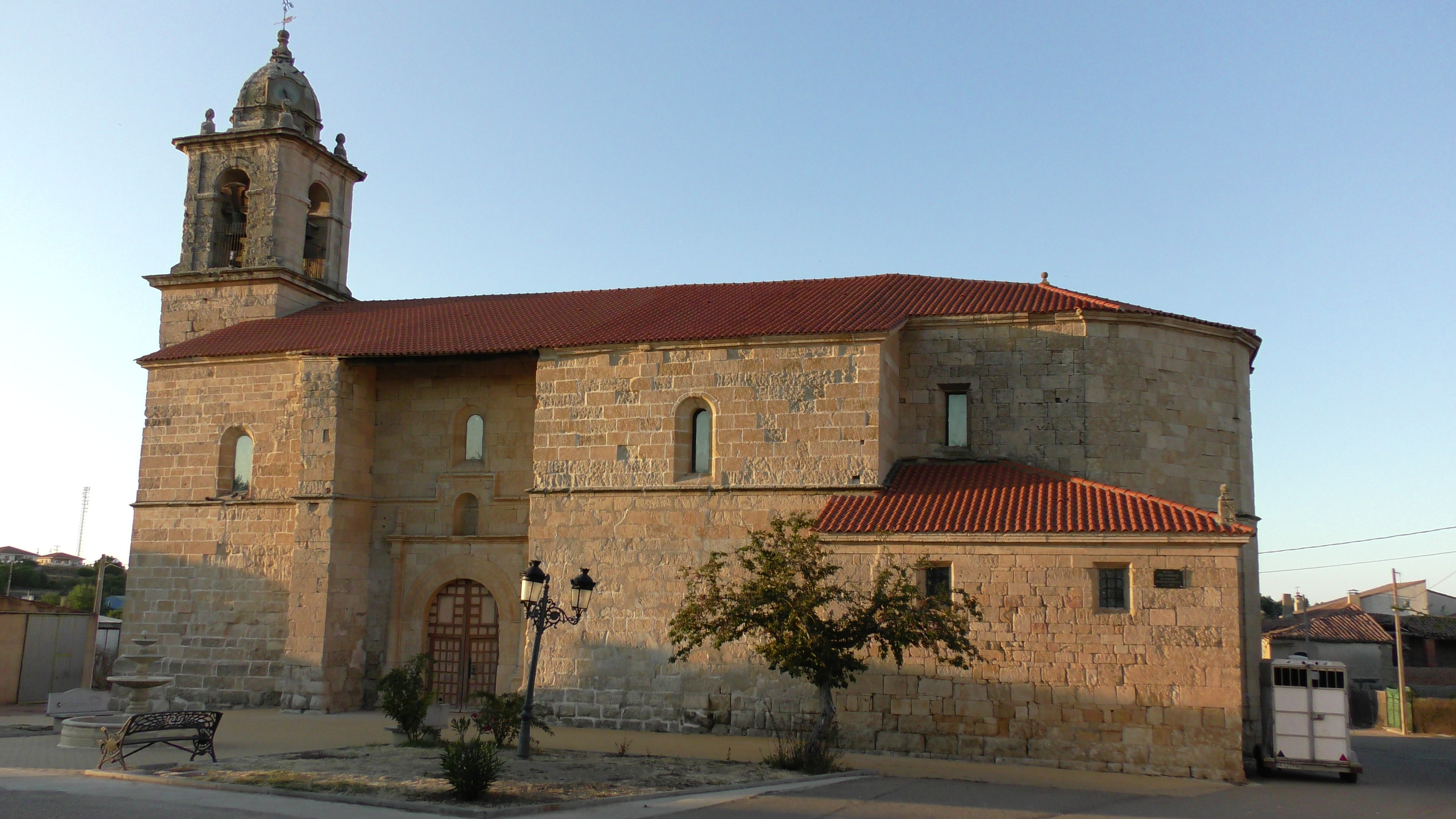
- Iglesia de la Asunción

- Spain
- Coordinates: 41°18′42″N 5°35′17″W
- Country: Spain
- Autonomous community: Castile and León
- Province: Zamora
- Comarca: La Guareña

Government
  - Mayor: Manuel de la Rocha Rodríguez

Area
  - Total: 23.09 km^{2} (8.92 sq mi)

Population (2025-01-01)
  - Total: 215
  - Density: 9.31/km^{2} (24.1/sq mi)
- Demonym: Argujillanos
- Time zone: UTC+1 (CET)
  - Summer (DST): UTC+2 (CEST)

Argujillo is a municipality located in the province of Zamora, Castile and León, Spain.
