= Tierra de Campos =

Coordinates: 42°00′N 4°00′W

- Comarca and Natural region
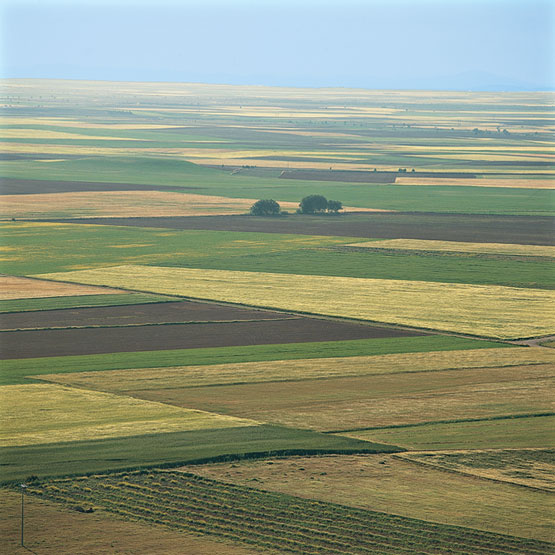
- Cultivated fields in northern Valladolid Province
- Interactive map of Tierra de Campos
- Country: Spain
- Autonomous community: Castile and León
- Province: León, Zamora, Valladolid and Palencia
- Capital: Palencia (unofficial)
- Municipalities: List: See text
- Elevation: 740 m (2,430 ft)
- Time zone: UTC+1 (CET)
  - Summer (DST): UTC+2 (CEST)
- Largest municipality: Palencia

Map of Tierra de Campos as it appears in the book "La Tierra de Campos: Región Natural", by Justo González Garrido

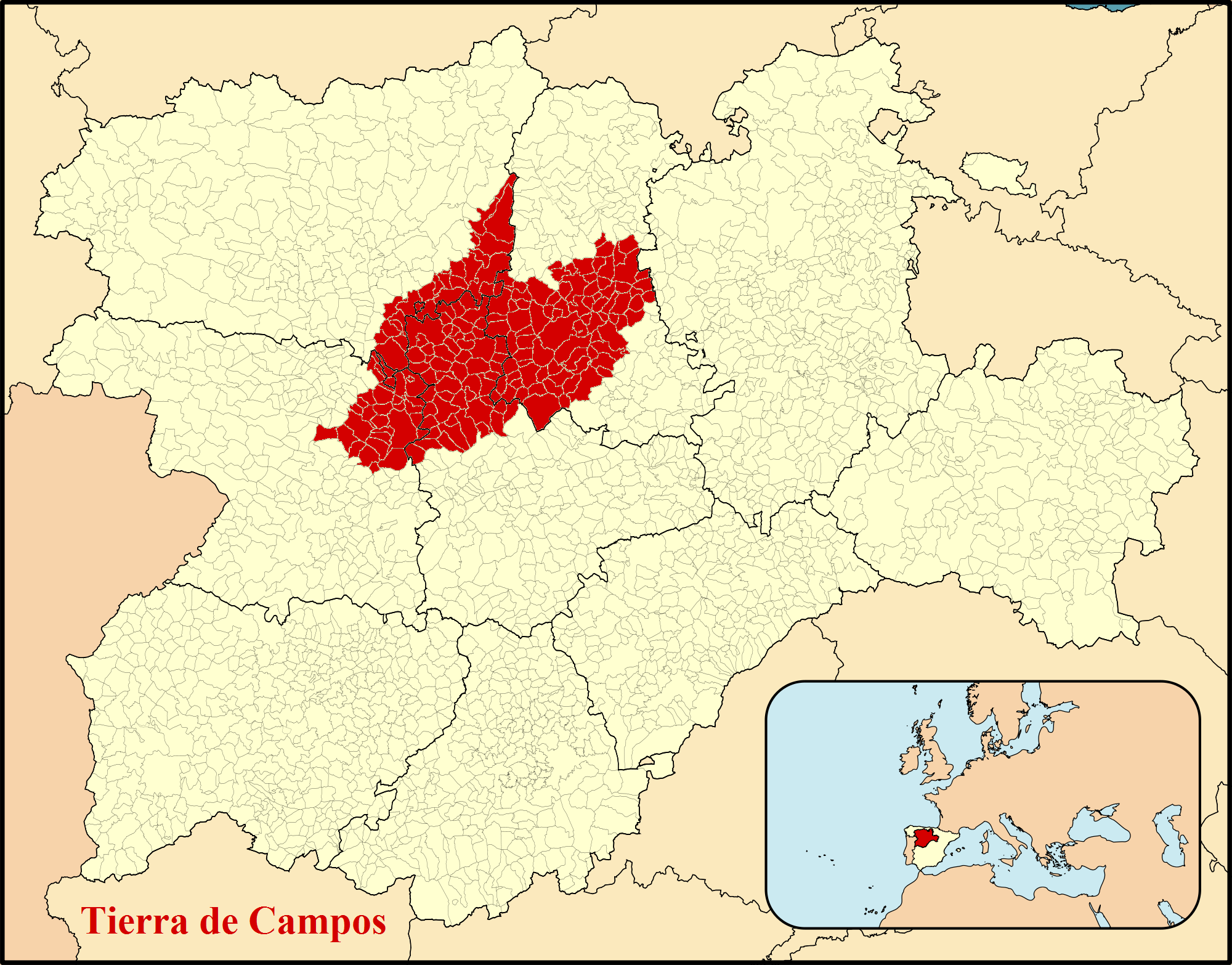
Location of present-day administrative areas under the name 'Tierra de Campos' in Castile and León

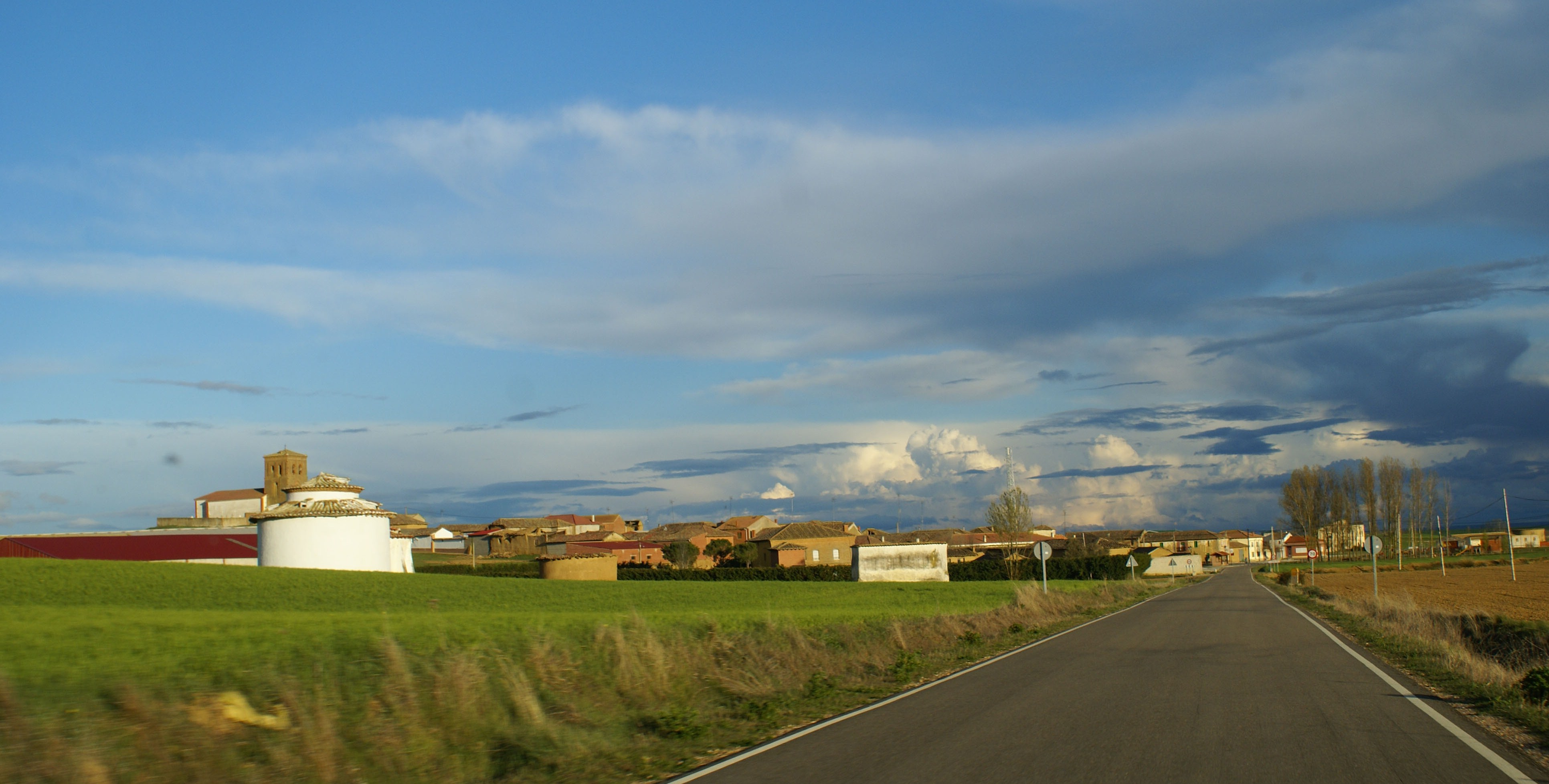
Characteristic Tierra de Campos landscape near Abastas.

Tierra de Campos ("Land of Fields") is a large historical and natural region or greater comarca that straddles the provinces of León, Zamora, Valladolid and Palencia, in Castile and León, Spain. It is a vast, desolate plain with practically no relief, except for some wide undulations of the terrain.

Originally it was known as "Gothic Plains" (Campi Gothici or Campi Gothorum), as the area had been settled by Visigoths who fled from Aquitaine Gaul after its conquest by the Franks. It was first mentioned under this name in Codex Vigilanus (Codex Albeldensis), and described as extending "from the river Douro, to the Christian Kingdom".

Despite the strong identity of its inhabitants, this historical region has not been able to achieve the necessary legal recognition for its administrative development. Therefore, its municipalities have resorted to organizing themselves in a mancomunidad, the only legal formula that has allowed the region to manage its public municipal resources meaningfully. Palencia is widely considered to be the capital of the Tierra de Campos.

== Geography ==
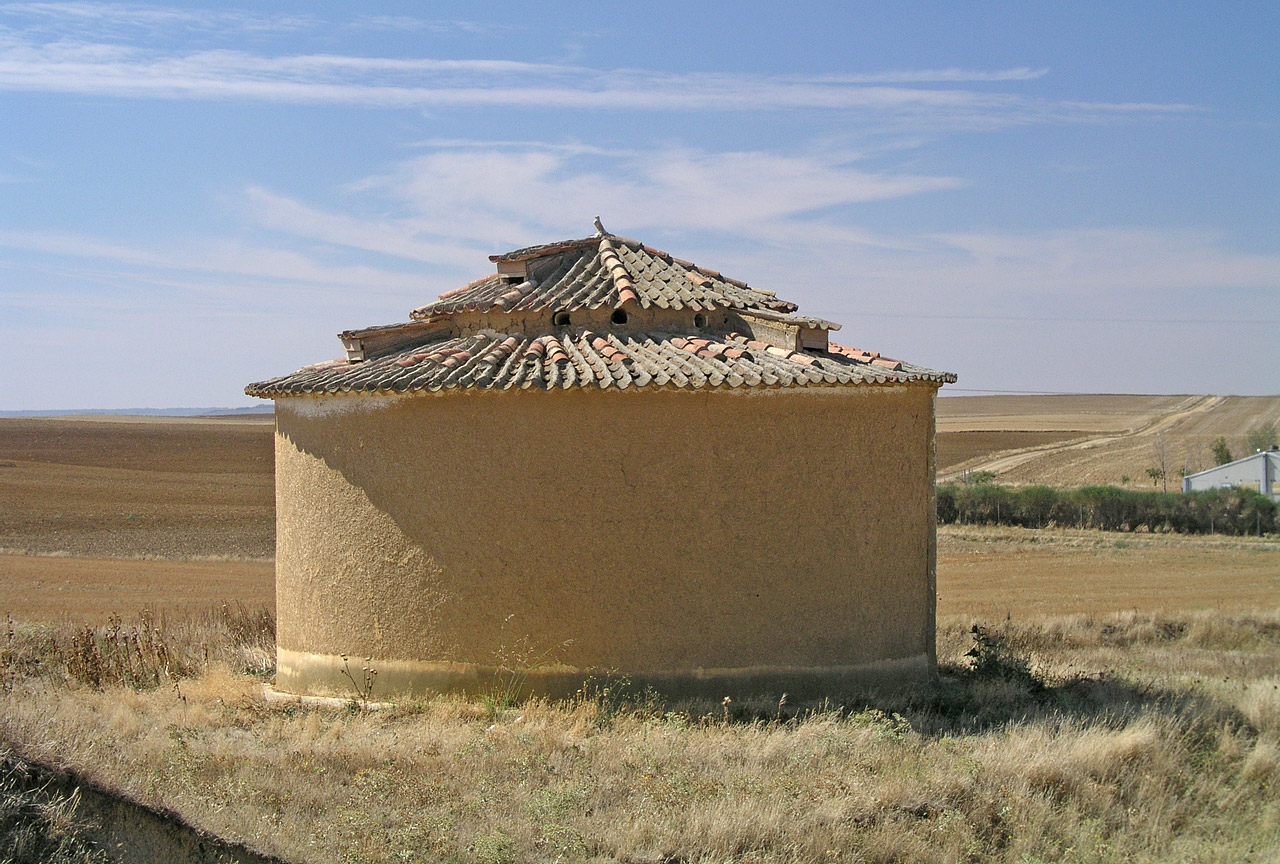
Traditional dovecote in Tierra de Campos

"Tierra de Campos" is located on a fertile, elevated plateau with an average height of around 720 metres (2,400 ft), its geography is typical of the Meseta Central. The ground is mostly made up of quite compact clay. The climate is continental with long, cold winters and short, hot summers. Rivers naturally irrigating the area are sparse and traditionally the land in Tierra de Campos has been used for dryland farming. The Channel of Castile, which cuts across this comarca, was developed for transport purposes but developed into an irrigation system. Some of the wetlands in Tierra de Campos, like the Laguna de la Nava de Fuentes and the Lagunas de Villafáfila, are important for the ecology of the region. There are few natural forested areas left. The Tierra de Campos is the place with the highest concentration of bustard in the Iberian Peninsula, and possibly in the world.

There is no unanimous agreement regarding the precise boundaries of the Tierra de Campos. Since it is a natural and traditional region, no official limits have ever been assigned. One of the most widely accepted system of boundaries has been the following:

- In the north: The foothills of the Cantabrian Mountains between Sahagún and Carrión de los Condes.
- In the east: The Carrión and Pisuerga river basins.
- In the south: The hills of Montes Torozos and the Sequillo river basin.
- In the west: The Salinas de Villalpando and the Cea River further north.

== Municipalities ==
=== León Province ===
- Almanza
- Bercianos del Real Camino
- Calzada del Coto
- Campazas
- Castilfalé
- Castrotierra de Valmadrigal
- Cea
- Cebanico
- Cimanes de la Vega
- Corbillos de los Oteros
- Escobar de Campos
- Fuentes de Carbajal
- Fresno de la Vega
- Gordaliza del Pino
- Gordoncillo
- Grajal de Campos
- Gusendos de los Oteros
- Izagre
- Joara
- Joarilla de las Matas
- Matadeón de los Oteros
- Matanza
- Sahagún
- Santa Cristina de Valmadrigal
- Valdemora
- Valderas
- Vallecillo
- Valverde-Enrique
- Villamoratiel de las Matas
- Villamartín de Don Sancho
- Villabraz
- Villamol
- Villaselán
- Villazanzo de Valderaduey

=== Zamora Province ===
- Belver de los Montes
- Cañizo
- Castroverde de Campos
- Cerecinos de Campos
- Cotanes del Monte
- Granja de Moreruela
- Manganeses de la Lampreana
- Prado
- Quintanilla del Monte
- Quintanilla del Olmo
- Revellinos
- San Agustín del Pozo
- San Cebrián de Castro
- San Esteban del Molar
- San Martín de Valderaduey
- Tapioles
- Vega de Villalobos
- Vidayanes
- Villafáfila
- Villalba de la Lampreana
- Villalobos
- Villalpando
- Villamayor de Campos
- Villanueva del Campo
- Villar de Fallaves
- Villárdiga
- Villarrín de Campos

=== Valladolid Province ===
- Aguilar de Campos
- Barcial de la Loma
- Becilla de Valderaduey
- Berrueces
- Bolaños de Campos
- Bustillo de Chaves
- Cabezón de Valderaduey
- Cabreros del Monte
- Castrobol
- Castroponce
- Ceinos de Campos
- Cuenca de Campos
- Fontihoyuelo
- Gatón de Campos
- Herrín de Campos
- La Unión de Campos
- Mayorga
- Medina de Rioseco
- Melgar de Abajo
- Melgar de Arriba
- Monasterio de Vega
- Montealegre de Campos
- Moral de la Reina
- Morales de Campos
- Palazuelo de Vedija
- Pozuelo de la Orden
- Quintanilla del Molar
- Roales de Campos
- Saelices de Mayorga
- San Pedro de Latarce
- Santa Eufemia del Arroyo
- Santervás de Campos
- Tamariz de Campos
- Tordehumos
- Urones de Castroponce
- Urueña
- Valdenebro de los Valles
- Valdunquillo
- Valverde de Campos
- Vega de Ruiponce
- Villabaruz de Campos
- Villabrágima
- Villacarralón
- Villacid de Campos
- Villafrades de Campos
- Villafrechós
- Villagarcía de Campos
- Villagómez la Nueva
- Villalba de la Loma
- Villalán de Campos
- Villalón de Campos
- Villamuriel de Campos
- Villanueva de San Mancio
- Villanueva de la Condesa
- Villanueva de los Caballeros
- Villardefrades
- Villavellid
- Villavicencio de los Caballeros

=== Palencia Province ===
- Abarca de Campos
- Abia de las Torres
- Amayuelas de Arriba
- Ampudia
- Amusco
- Arconada
- Autilla del Pino
- Autillo de Campos
- Baquerín de Campos
- Bárcena de Campos
- Becerril de Campos
- Belmonte de Campos
- Boada de Campos
- Boadilla de Rioseco
- Boadilla del Camino
- Calzada de los Molinos
- Capillas
- Cardeñosa de Volpejera
- Carrión de los Condes
- Castil de Vela
- Castrillo de Villavega
- Castromocho
- Cervatos de la Cueza
- Cisneros, Palencia
- Espinosa de Villagonzalo
- Frechilla
- Frómista
- Fuentes de Nava
- Fuentes de Valdepero
- Grijota
- Guaza de Campos
- Husillos
- Itero de la Vega
- Lantadilla
- Loma de Ucieza
- Lomas de Campos
- Manquillos
- Marcilla de Campos
- Mazariegos
- Mazuecos de Valdeginate
- Meneses de Campos
- Monzón de Campos
- Moratinos
- Nogal de las Huertas
- Osornillo
- Osorno la Mayor
- Palencia
- Paredes de Nava
- Pedraza de Campos
- Perales
- Piña de Campos
- Población de Arroyo
- Población de Campos
- Pozo de Urama
- Requena de Campos
- Revenga de Campos
- Ribas de Campos
- Riberos de la Cueza
- San Cebrián de Campos
- San Mamés de Campos
- San Román de la Cuba
- Santa Cecilia del Alcor
- Santoyo
- Támara de Campos
- Torremormojón
- Valde-Ucieza
- Valle del Retortillo
- Villacidaler
- Villada
- Villaherreros
- Villalcázar de Sirga
- Villalcón
- Villalobón
- Villanueva del Campo
- Villamartín de Campos
- Villamoronta
- Villamuera de la Cueza
- Villanueva del Rebollar
- Villarmentero de Campos
- Villarramiel
- Villasarracino
- Villaturde
- Villaumbrales
- Villerías de Campos
- Villoldo
- Villovieco

== Maps of Tierra de Campos areas in different provinces ==
Tierra de Campos Zamorana

Tierra de Campos in Palencia

Tierra de Campos of Valladolid; in purple

Tierra de Campos Leonesa; in brown.

== See also ==
- Tierra del Pan
- Comarcas of Spain
