= Castilfalé =

Castilfalé Castilfaléi
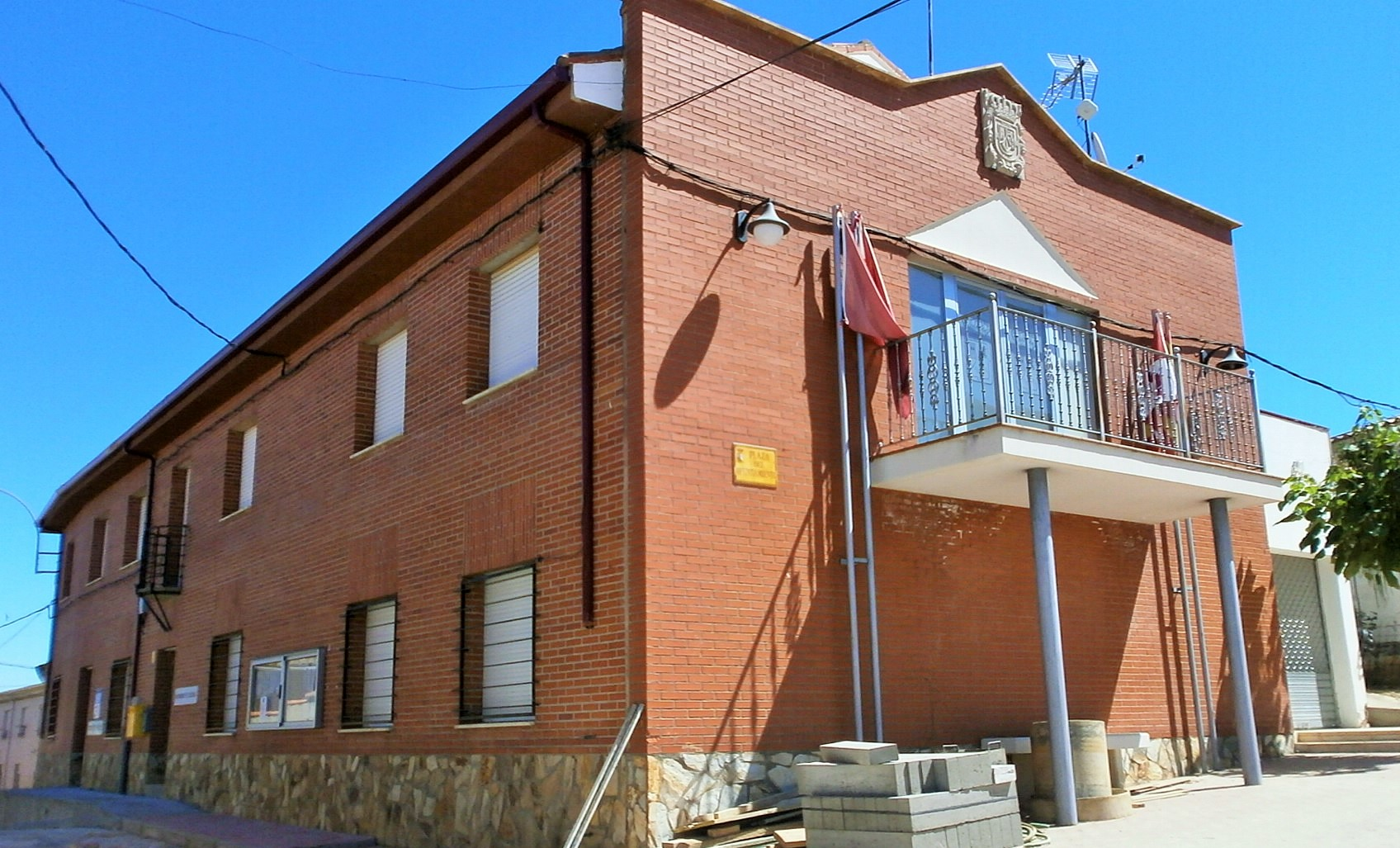
- Town hall

- Flag Coat of arms

- Location within Spain
- Coordinates: 42°13′10″N 5°25′20″W
- Country: Spain
- Autonomous community: Castile and León
- Province: León
- Municipality: Castilfalé

Government
  - Mayor: Purificación del Valle Pellitero (PP)

Area
  - Total: 25.90 km^{2} (10.00 sq mi)
- Elevation: 819 m (2,687 ft)

Population (2025-01-01)
  - Total: 58
  - Density: 2.2/km^{2} (5.8/sq mi)
- Demonym: castilfalense
- Time zone: UTC+1 (CET)
  - Summer (DST): UTC+2 (CEST)
- Postal Code: 24206
- Telephone prefix: 987
- Climate: Cfb
- Website: Ayto. de Castilfalé

Castilfalé (Spanish pronunciation: [kastilfaˈle], Leonese: Castilfaléi) is a municipality located in the province of León, Castile and León, Spain. According to the 2010 census (INE), the municipality has a population of 91 inhabitants.

== See also ==
- Tierra de Campos
