= Villazanzo de Valderaduey =

Coordinates: 42°32′N 4°57′W

- municipality
- Coat of arms

- Country: Spain
- Autonomous community: Castile and León
- Province: León
- Municipality: Villazanzo de Valderaduey

Area
  - Total: 145.88 km^{2} (56.32 sq mi)
- Elevation: 912 m (2,992 ft)

Population (2025-01-01)
  - Total: 360
  - Density: 2.5/km^{2} (6.4/sq mi)
- Time zone: UTC+1 (CET)
  - Summer (DST): UTC+2 (CEST)

Villazanzo de Valderaduey (Spanish pronunciation: [biʎaˈθanθo ðe βaldeɾaˈðwej]) is a municipality located in the province of León, Castile and León, Spain. According to the 2004 census (INE), the municipality had a population of 665 inhabitants.

== Villages in the municipality ==
- Carbajal de Valderaduey
- Castrillo de Valderaduey
- Mozos de Cea
- Renedo de Valderaduey
- Valdescapa de Cea
- Velilla de Valderaduey
- Villadiego de Cea
- Villavelasco de Valderaduey
- Villazanzo de Valderaduey

== See also ==
- Tierra de Campos
