= Escobar de Campos =

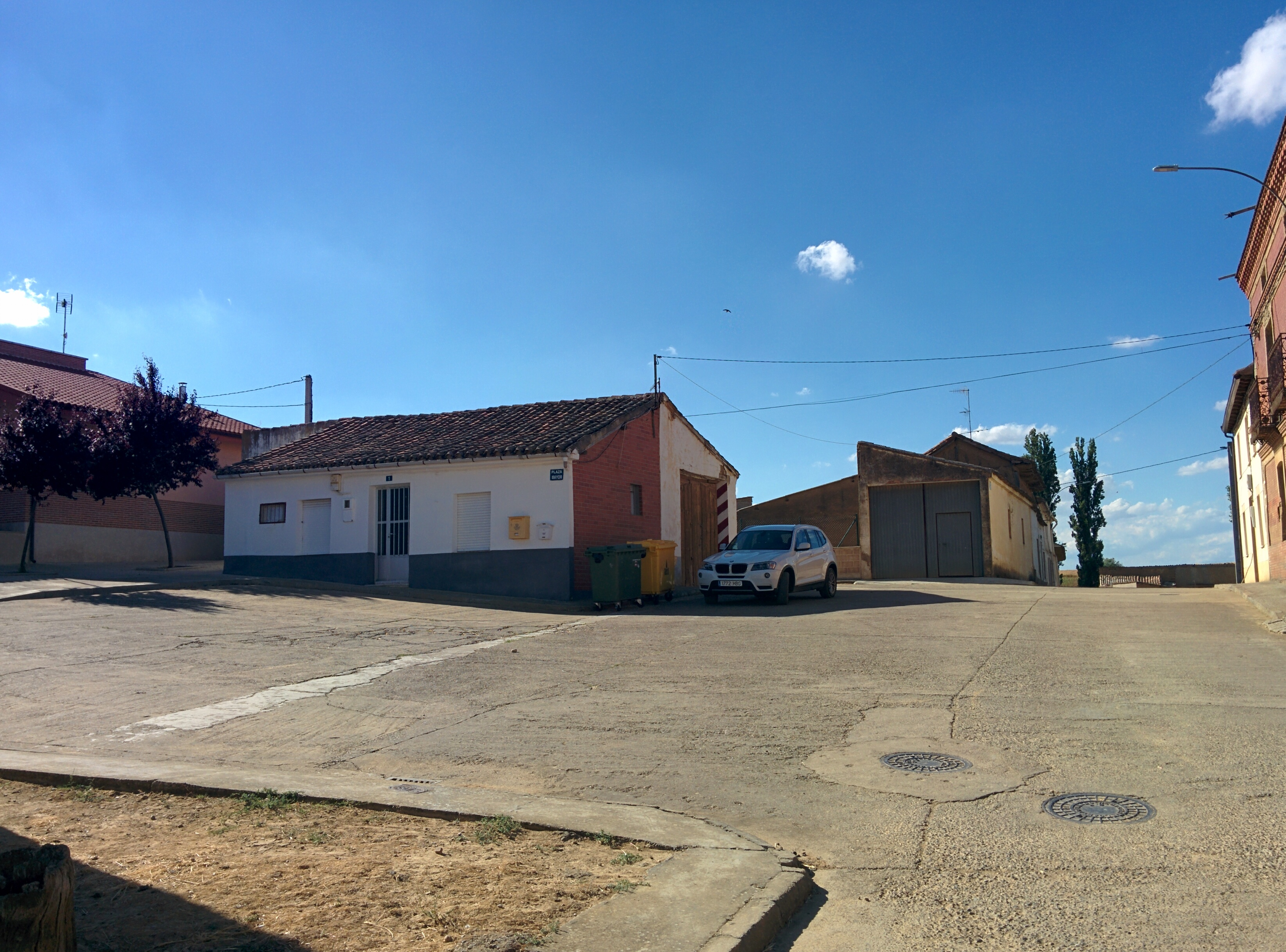
- Town hall

- Location within Spain
- Coordinates: 42°18′49″N 4°58′1″W
- Country: Spain
- Autonomous community: Castile and León
- Province: León
- Comarca: Tierra de Sahagún

Government
  - Mayor: Segundo Velasco Fernández (PP)

Area
  - Total: 17.14 km^{2} (6.62 sq mi)
- Elevation: 812 m (2,664 ft)

Population (2025-01-01)
  - Total: 32
  - Density: 1.9/km^{2} (4.8/sq mi)
- Demonym: Escobarejos
- Time zone: UTC+1 (CET)
  - Summer (DST): UTC+2 (CEST)
- Postal Code: 24341
- Telephone prefix: 987
- Climate: Cfb

Escobar de Campos (Spanish pronunciation: [eskoˈβaɾ ðe ˈkampos]) is a municipality located in the province of León, Castile and León, Spain. According to the 2010 census (INE), the municipality has a population of 56 inhabitants.

== See also ==
- Tierra de Campos
