= Campazas =

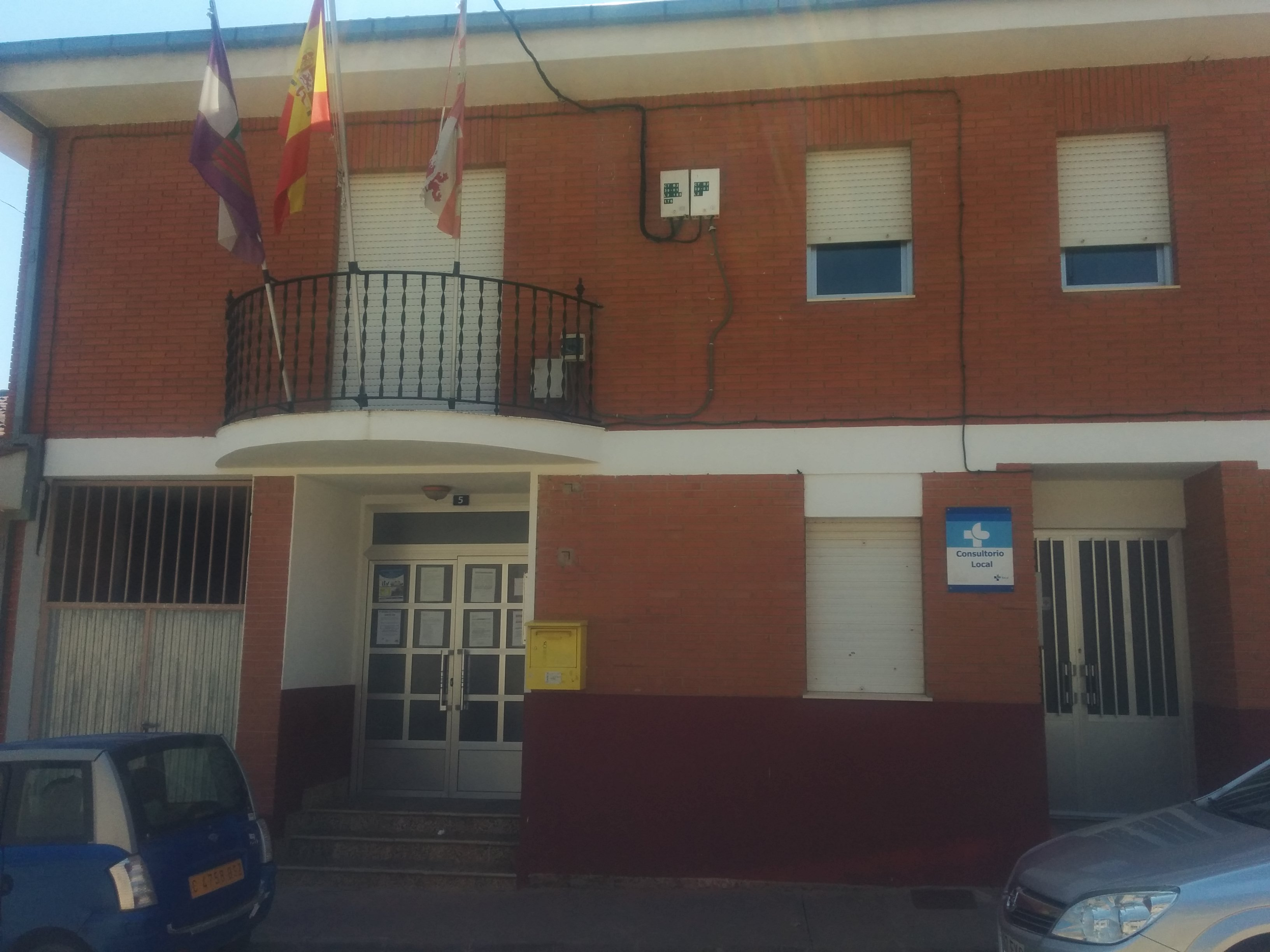

- Flag Coat of arms

- Location within Spain
- Coordinates: 42°8′31″N 5°29′30″W
- Country: Spain
- Autonomous community: Castile and León
- Province: León
- Municipality: Campazas

Government
  - Mayor: Vitalino Macario Cartujo Serrano (PSOE)

Area
  - Total: 20.88 km^{2} (8.06 sq mi)
- Elevation: 770 m (2,530 ft)

Population (2025-01-01)
  - Total: 110
  - Density: 5.3/km^{2} (14/sq mi)
- Demonym: campacense
- Time zone: UTC+1 (CET)
  - Summer (DST): UTC+2 (CEST)
- Postal Code: 24221
- Telephone prefix: 987
- Climate: Cfb

Campazas (Spanish pronunciation: [kamˈpaθas]) is a municipality located in the province of León, Castile and León, Spain. According to the 2010 census (INE), the municipality has a population of 154 inhabitants.

== See also ==
- Tierra de Campos
