= Valle del Retortillo =

- municipality
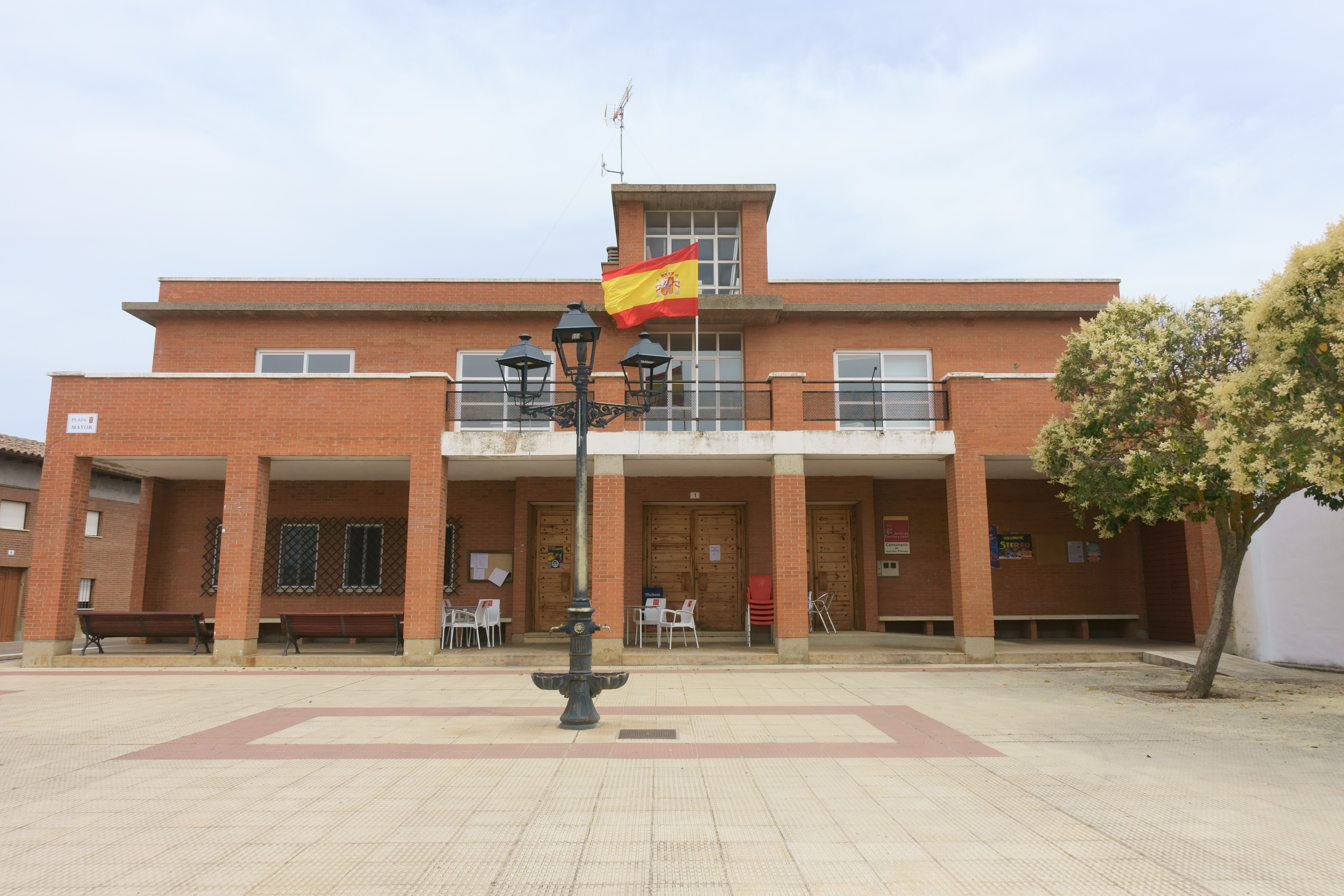

- Flag Coat of arms
- Interactive map of Valle del Retortillo
- Country: Spain
- Autonomous community: Castile and León
- Province: Palencia
- Municipality: Valle del Retortillo

Area
  - Total: 63 km^{2} (24 sq mi)

Population (2025-01-01)
  - Total: 155
  - Density: 2.5/km^{2} (6.4/sq mi)
- Time zone: UTC+1 (CET)
  - Summer (DST): UTC+2 (CEST)
- Website: Official website

Valle del Retortillo is a municipality located in the province of Palencia, Castile and León, Spain. According to the 2004 census (INE), the municipality has a population of 189 inhabitants.

== Villages ==
The municipal term was created at the end of the 20th century merging the villages of former partido de Frechilla that had 135 homes and 364 inhabitantsitants. The capital was established at Villalumbroso. The municipality has lost about a 50% of its population since then.

- Abastas and Abastillas, 50 homes and 170 inhabitants.
- Añoza, 27 homes and 88 inhabitants.
- Villalumbroso, 58 homes and 193 inhabitants.
- Villatoquite, 40 homes and 114 inhabitants.

== See also ==
- Tierra de Campos
