= Guaza de Campos =

Coordinates: 42°08′N 4°54′W

- municipality
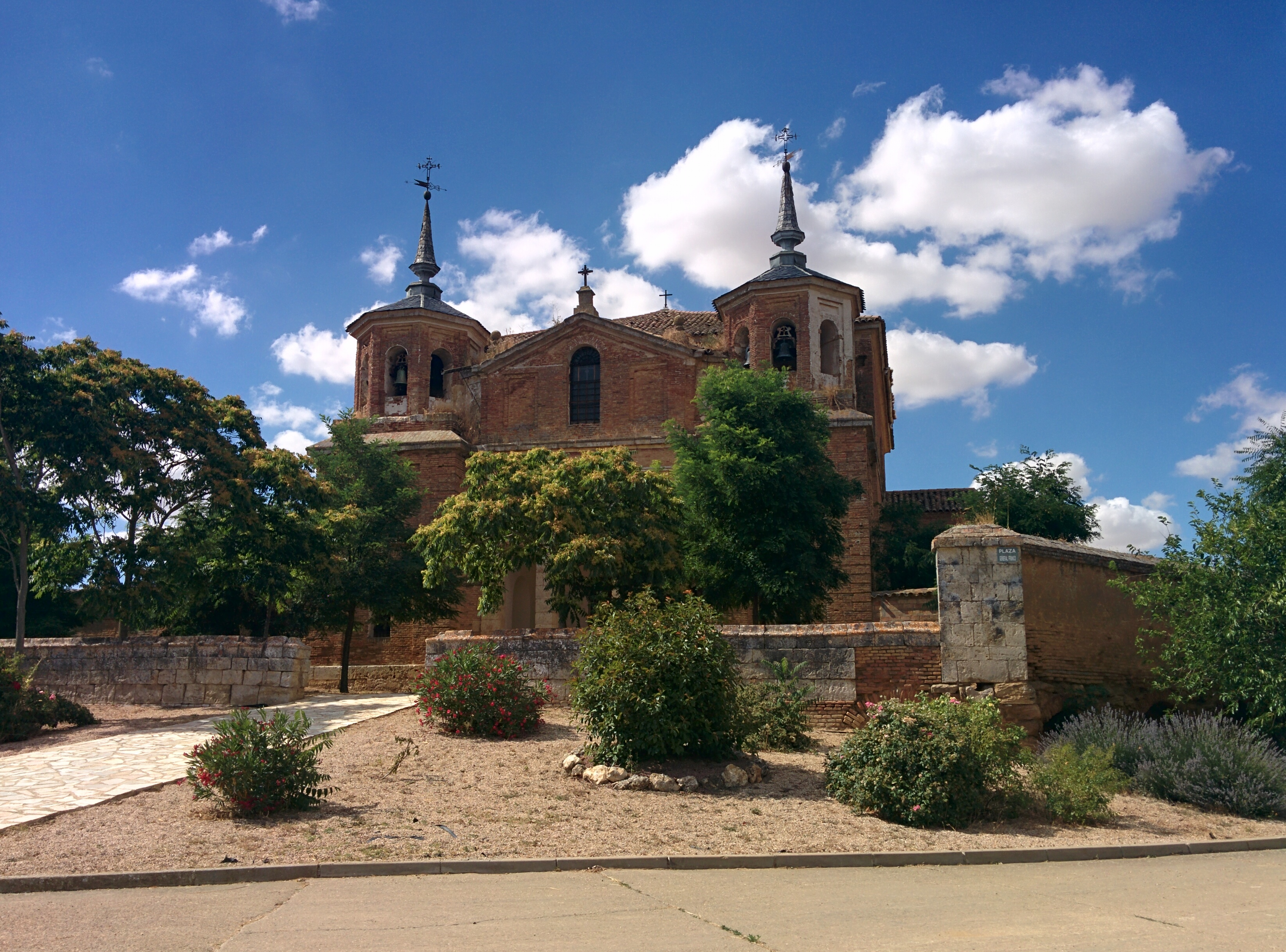

- Flag Coat of arms
- Interactive map of Guaza de Campos
- Country: Spain
- Autonomous community: Castile and León
- Province: Palencia
- Municipality: Guaza de Campos

Area
  - Total: 32 km^{2} (12 sq mi)

Population (2025-01-01)
  - Total: 57
  - Density: 1.8/km^{2} (4.6/sq mi)
- Time zone: UTC+1 (CET)
  - Summer (DST): UTC+2 (CEST)
- Website: Official website

Guaza de Campos is a municipality located in the province of Palencia, Castile and León, Spain. It is in the plain known as the Tierra de Campos.

According to the 2004 census (INE), the municipality had a population of 68 inhabitants.
