= Espinosa de Villagonzalo =

Coordinates: 42°29′N 4°22′W

- municipality
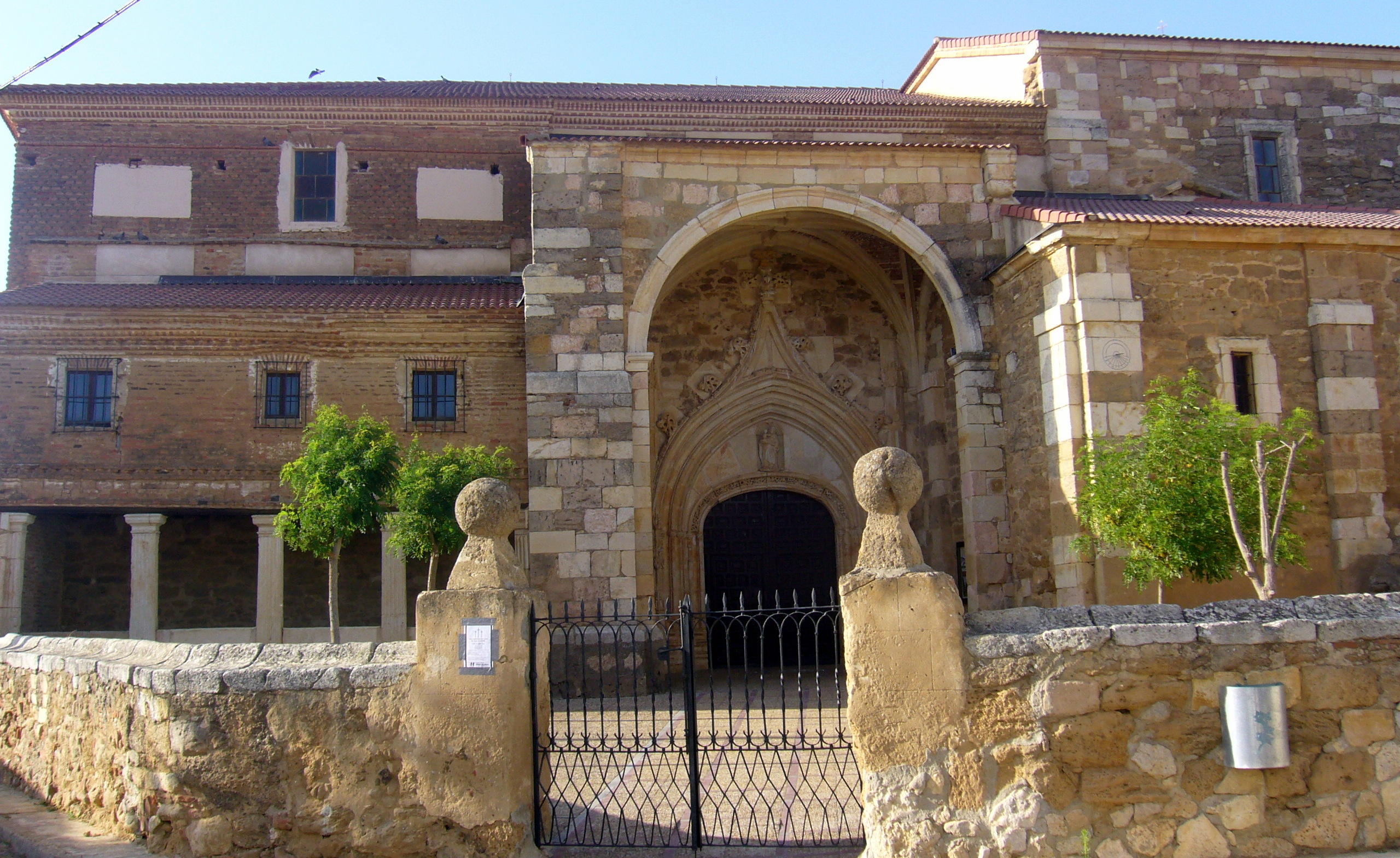

- Flag Coat of arms
- Interactive map of Espinosa de Villagonzalo
- Country: Spain
- Autonomous community: Castile and León
- Province: Palencia
- Municipality: Espinosa de Villagonzalo

Area
  - Total: 38.04 km^{2} (14.69 sq mi)
- Elevation: 847 m (2,779 ft)

Population (2025-01-01)
  - Total: 164
  - Density: 4.31/km^{2} (11.2/sq mi)
- Time zone: UTC+1 (CET)
  - Summer (DST): UTC+2 (CEST)
- Website: Official website

Espinosa de Villagonzalo is a municipality located in the province of Palencia, Castile and León, Spain. According to the 2004 census (INE), the municipality had a population of 226 inhabitants.

== See also ==
- Tierra de Campos
