= Quintanilla del Monte =

Coordinates: 41.868°N 5.349°W

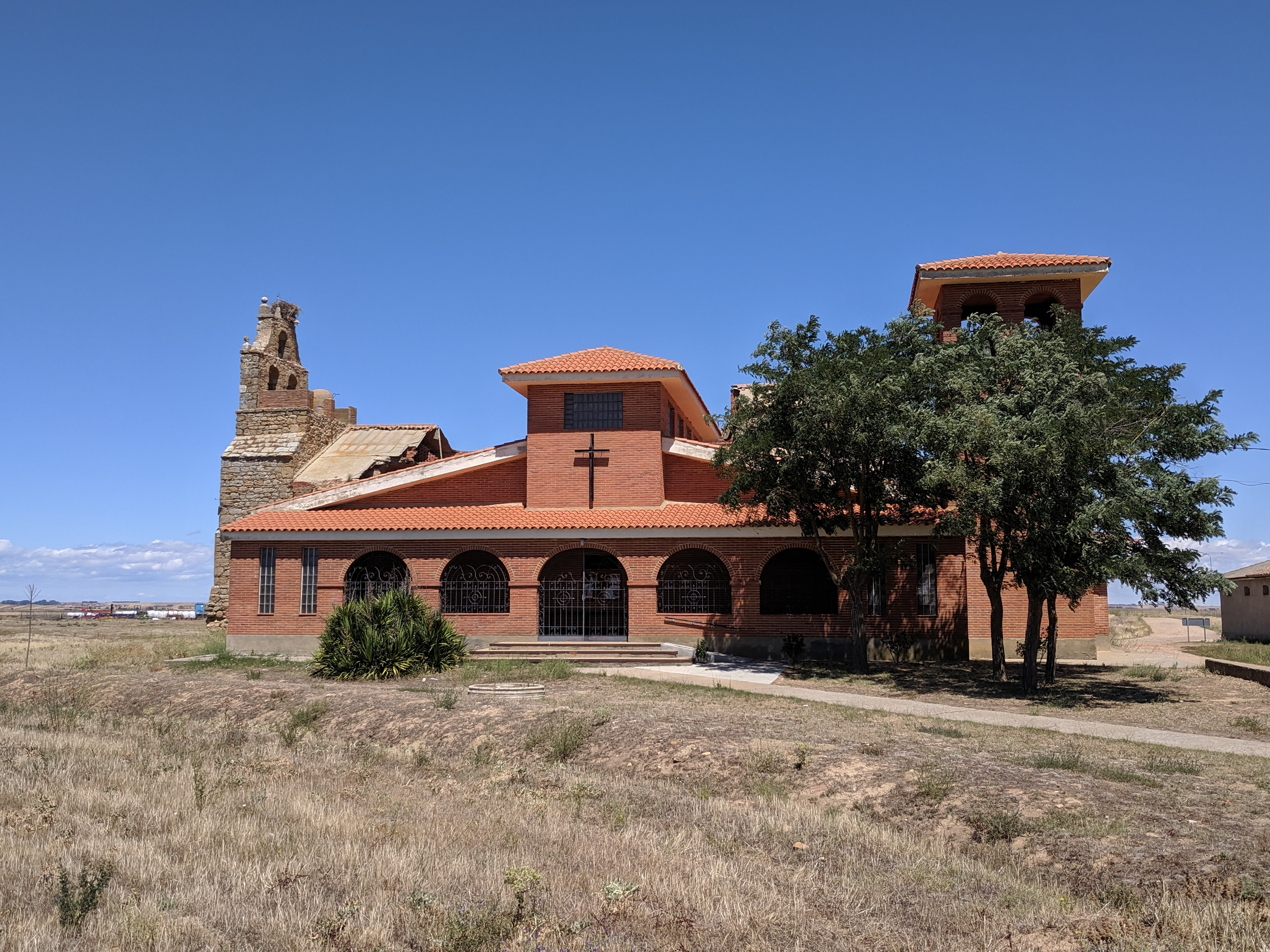

- Flag Coat of arms
- Interactive map of Quintanilla del Monte
- Country: Spain
- Autonomous community: Castile and León
- Province: Zamora
- Municipality: Quintanilla del Monte

Area
  - Total: 21 km^{2} (8.1 sq mi)

Population (2025-01-01)
  - Total: 93
  - Density: 4.4/km^{2} (11/sq mi)
- Time zone: UTC+1 (CET)
  - Summer (DST): UTC+2 (CEST)

Quintanilla del Monte is a municipality located in the province of Zamora, Castile and León, Spain. According to the 2004 census (INE), the municipality has a population of 130 inhabitants.
