= Villafrades de Campos =

Coordinates: 42°05′N 4°58′W

Villafrades de Campos, Spain
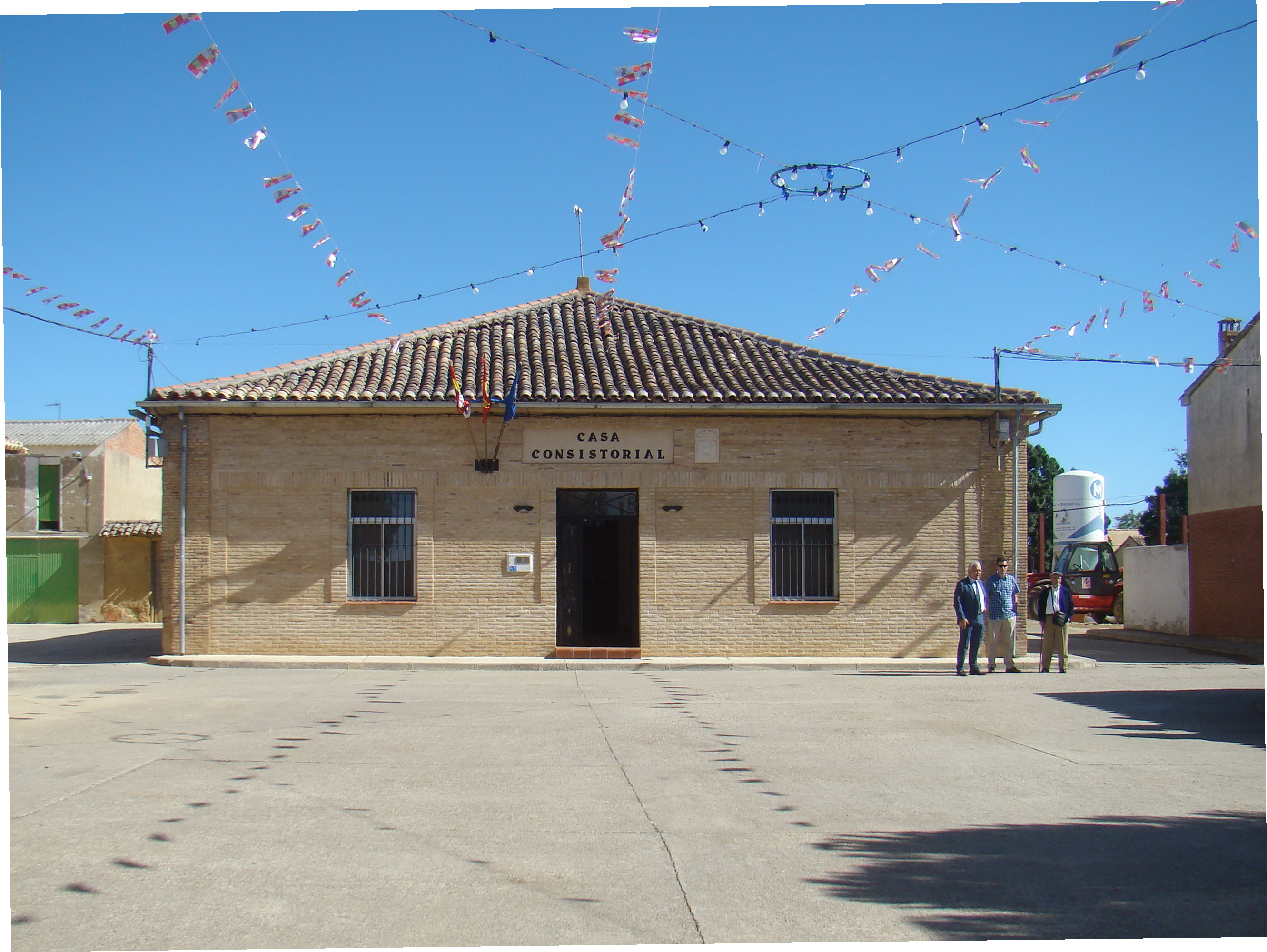
- Villafrades de Campos Town hall.
- Interactive map of Villafrades de Campos, Spain
- Country: Spain
- Autonomous community: Castile and León
- Province: Valladolid
- Municipality: Villafrades de Campos

Area
  - Total: 20 km^{2} (7.7 sq mi)

Population (2025-01-01)
  - Total: 59
  - Density: 3.0/km^{2} (7.6/sq mi)
- Time zone: UTC+1 (CET)
  - Summer (DST): UTC+2 (CEST)

Villafrades de Campos is a municipality located in the province of Valladolid, Castile and León, Spain. According to the 2004 census (INE), the municipality has a population of 101 inhabitants.

Village's festivities are known where each year tradition and alcohol rally hundreds looking for a rural festival.
