= Vidayanes =

Coordinates: 41°54′N 5°34′W

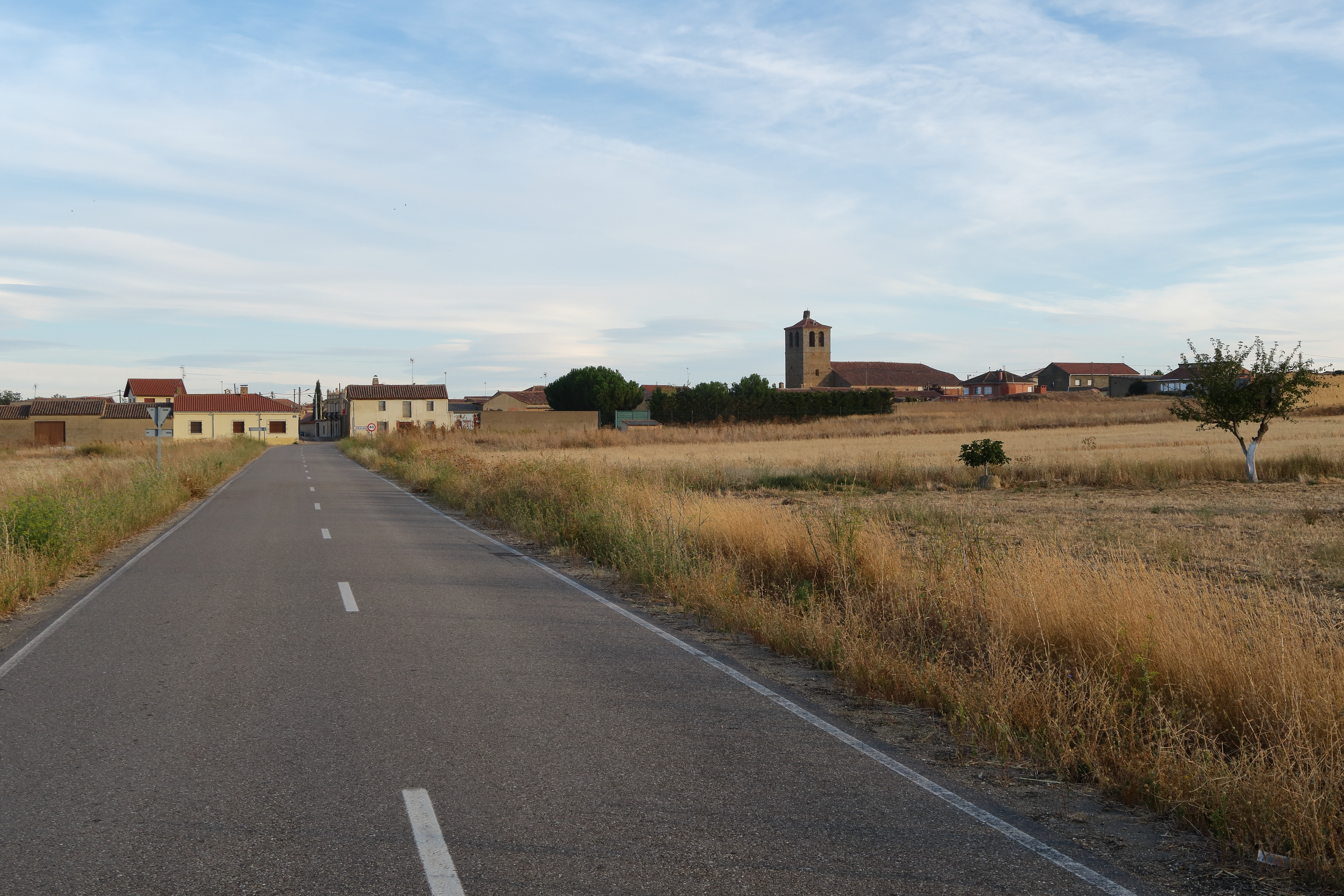
- Interactive map of Vidayanes
- Country: Spain
- Autonomous community: Castile and León
- Province: Zamora
- Municipality: Vidayanes

Area
  - Total: 12 km^{2} (4.6 sq mi)

Population (2025-01-01)
  - Total: 74
  - Density: 6.2/km^{2} (16/sq mi)
- Time zone: UTC+1 (CET)
  - Summer (DST): UTC+2 (CEST)

Vidayanes is a municipality located in the province of Zamora, Castile and León, Spain. According to the 2004 census (INE), the municipality has a population of 103 inhabitants.
