= Moral de la Reina =

Coordinates: 41°59′N 5°04′W

Moral de la Reina, Spain
- Coat of arms

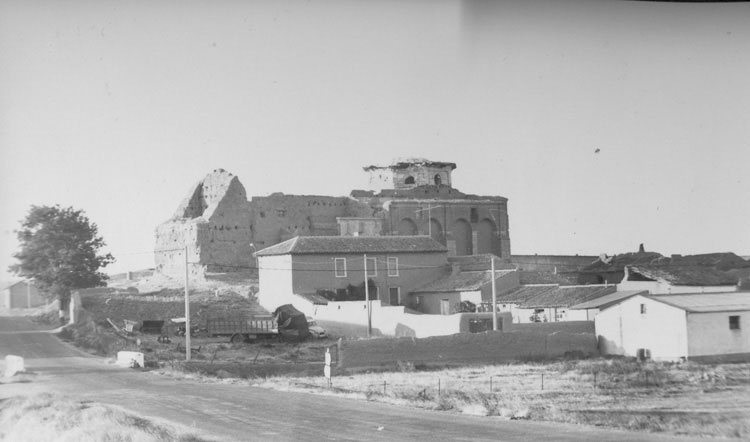
- Church of San Juan
- Country: Spain
- Autonomous community: Castile and León
- Province: Valladolid
- Municipality: Moral de la Reina

Area
  - Total: 42 km^{2} (16 sq mi)

Population (2025-01-01)
  - Total: 129
  - Density: 3.1/km^{2} (8.0/sq mi)
- Time zone: UTC+1 (CET)
  - Summer (DST): UTC+2 (CEST)

Moral de la Reina is a municipality located in the province of Valladolid, Castile and León, Spain. According to the 2004 census (INE), the municipality has a population of 245 inhabitants.
