= Villacid de Campos =

Coordinates: 42°05′N 5°07′W

Villacid de Campos, Spain
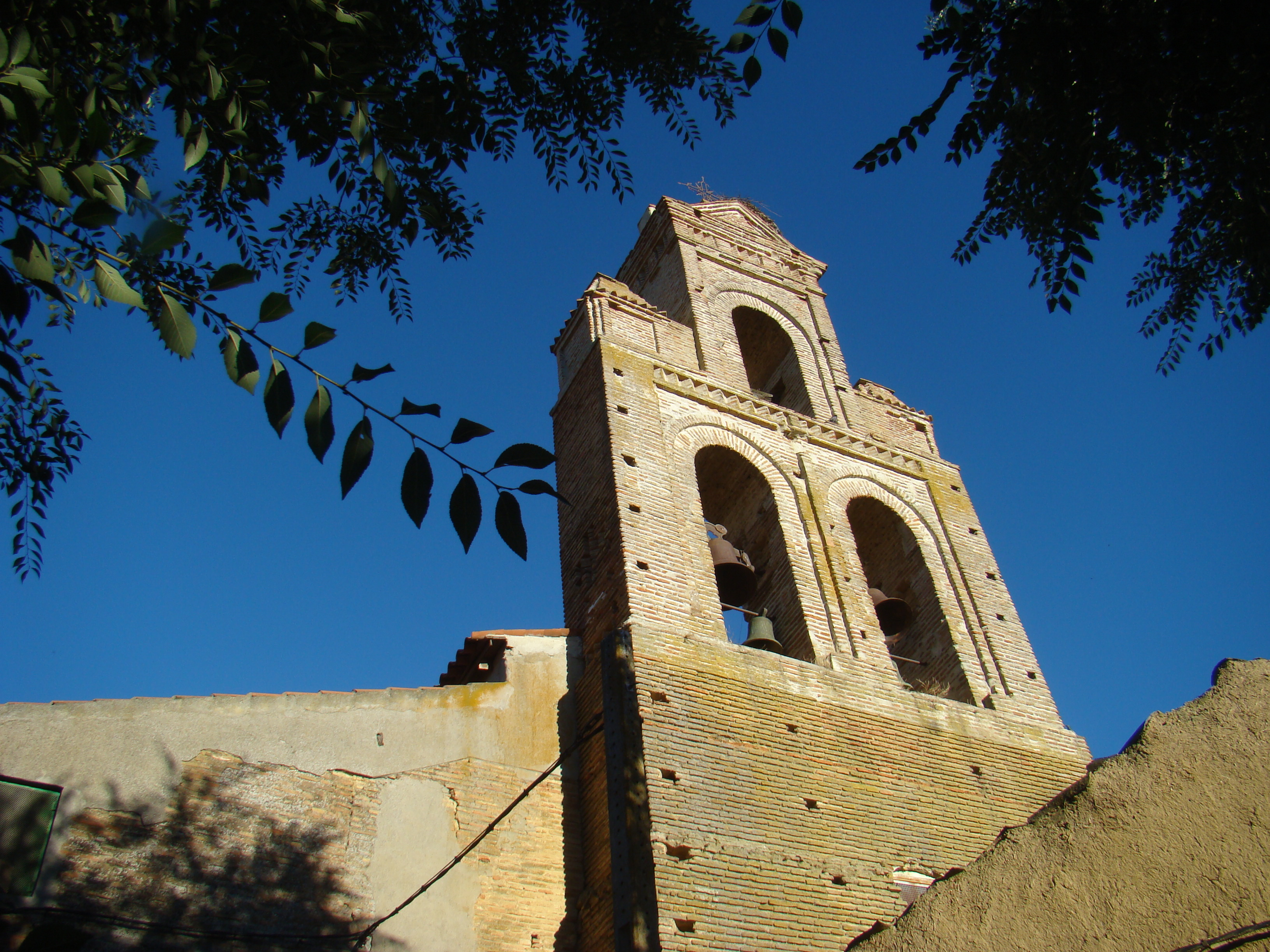
- Parish Church of Santa María la Nueva in Villacid de Campos
- Interactive map of Villacid de Campos, Spain
- Country: Spain
- Autonomous community: Castile and León
- Province: Valladolid
- Municipality: Villacid de Campos

Area
  - Total: 24 km^{2} (9.3 sq mi)

Population (2025-01-01)
  - Total: 83
  - Density: 3.5/km^{2} (9.0/sq mi)
- Time zone: UTC+1 (CET)
  - Summer (DST): UTC+2 (CEST)

Villacid de Campos is a municipality located in the province of Valladolid, Castile and León, Spain. According to the 2004 census (INE), the municipality has a population of 103 inhabitants.
