= Quintanilla del Olmo =

Coordinates: 41°54′N 5°24′W

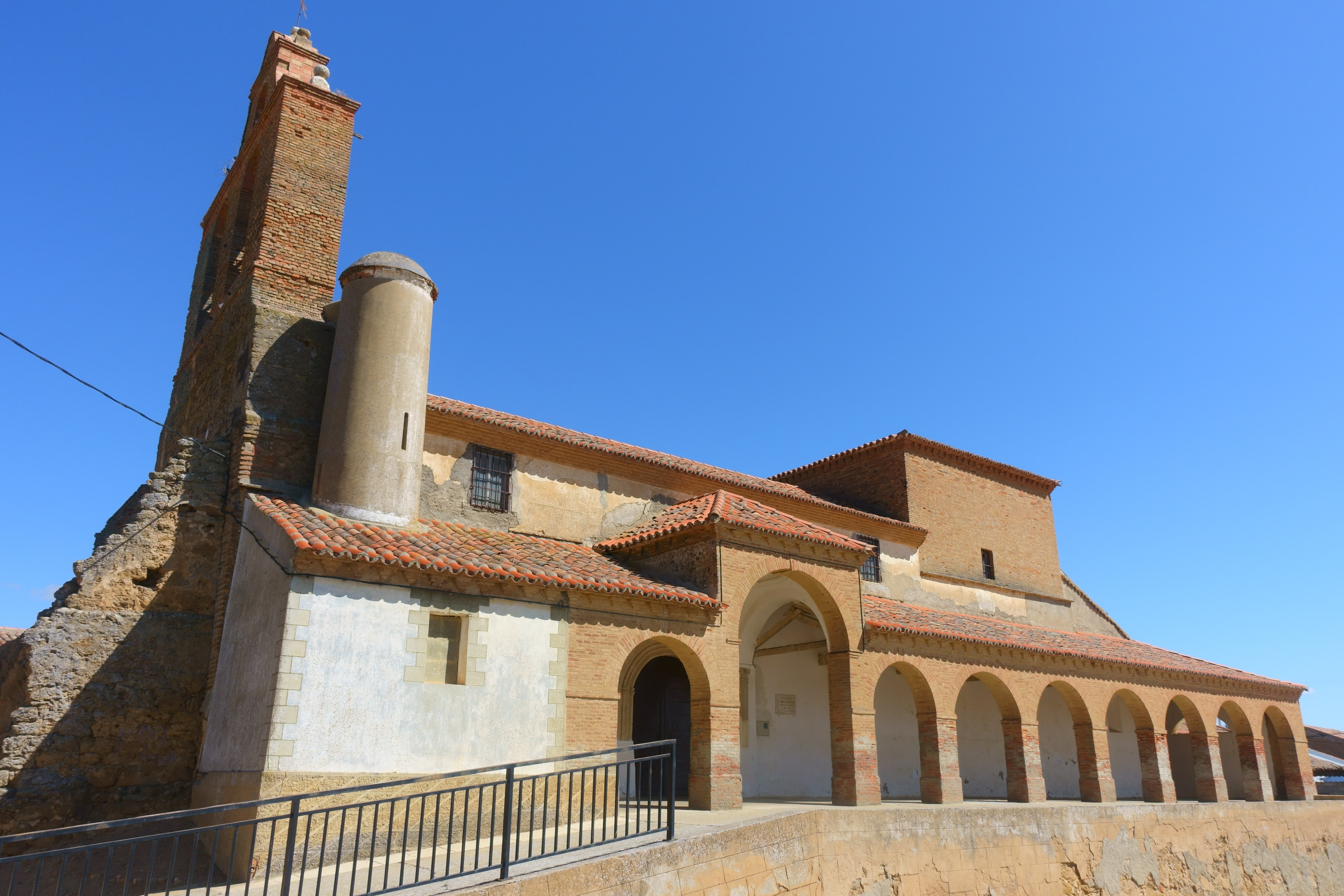
- Interactive map of Quintanilla del Olmo
- Country: Spain
- Autonomous community: Castile and León
- Province: Province of Zamora
- Municipality: Quintanilla del Olmo

Area
  - Total: 12 km^{2} (4.6 sq mi)

Population (2025-01-01)
  - Total: 38
  - Density: 3.2/km^{2} (8.2/sq mi)
- Time zone: UTC+1 (CET)
  - Summer (DST): UTC+2 (CEST)

Quintanilla del Olmo is a municipality located in the province of Zamora, Castile and León, Spain. According to the 2004 census (INE), the municipality has a population of 50 inhabitants.
