= Villar de Fallaves =

Coordinates: 41°56′N 5°20′W

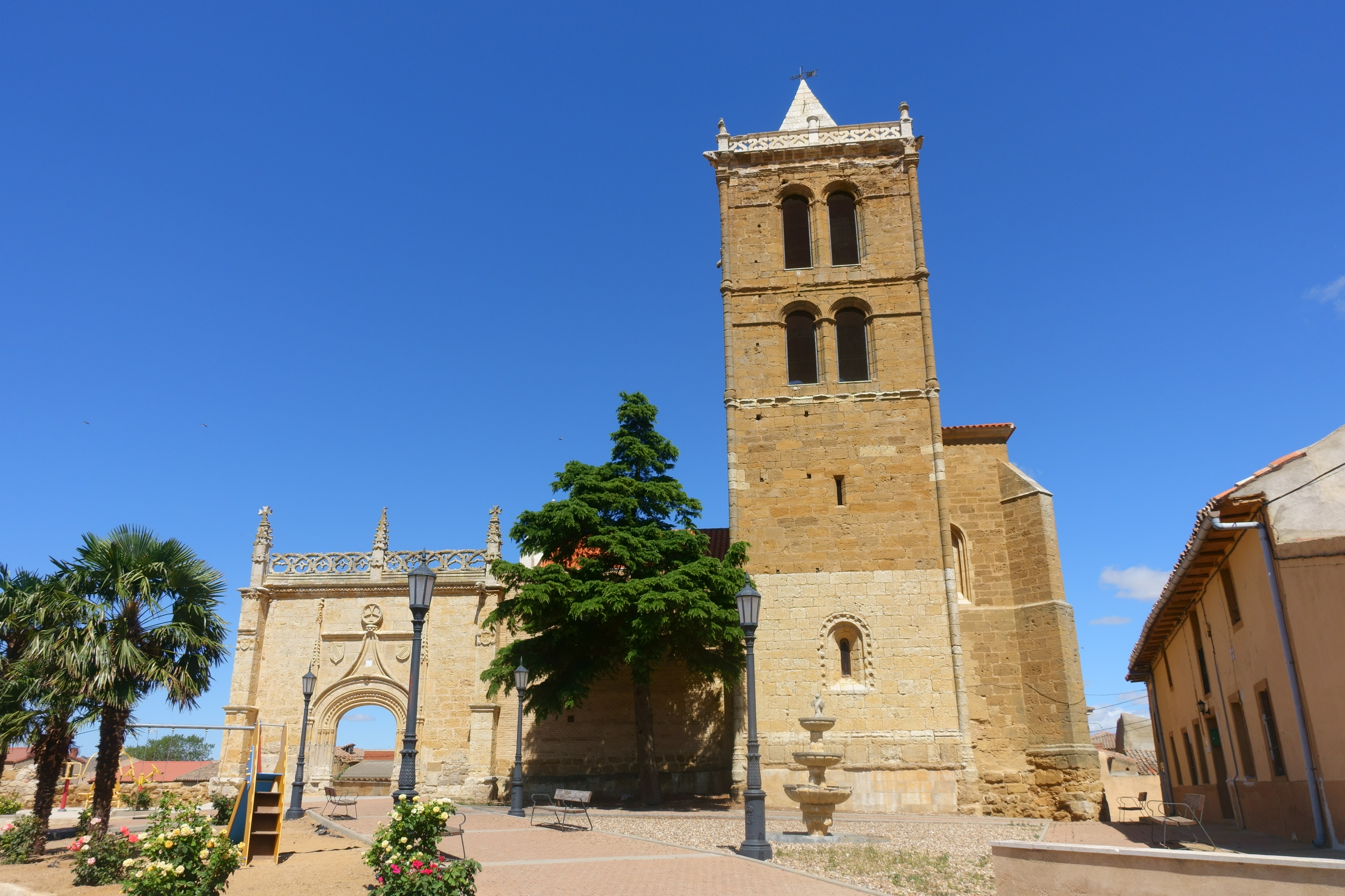
- Interactive map of Villar de Fallaves
- Country: Spain
- Autonomous community: Castile and León
- Province: Zamora
- Municipality: Villar de Fallaves

Area
  - Total: 20 km^{2} (7.7 sq mi)

Population (2025-01-01)
  - Total: 50
  - Density: 2.5/km^{2} (6.5/sq mi)
- Time zone: UTC+1 (CET)
  - Summer (DST): UTC+2 (CEST)

Villar de Fallaves is a municipality located in the province of Zamora, Castile and León, Spain. According to the 2004 census (INE), the municipality has a population of 96 inhabitants.

== Geography ==
The municipality is located in the Tierra de Campos region. It covers an area of 20.95 km², part of which is part of the Penillanuras-Campos Sur SPA.

== History ==
Its history dates back at least to Roman times, since its term is crossed by the Roman road that linked the Duero with Pallantia . In the 13th century it belonged to the district of Villalpando, being one of the towns that had a certain importance as demonstrated by the fact that it had quicksilver, places of daily sale, and markets for weekly sales. In addition, at this same time it had two churches, and until the 19th century it had numerous hermitages: Santa Marina, Santa Catalina, San Mauro, La Concepción, Los Mártires, San Fabián, San Sebastián and San Pedro Apóstol.
