= Berrueces de Campos =

Municipality of Spain

Coordinates: 41°56′00″N 5°05′00″W

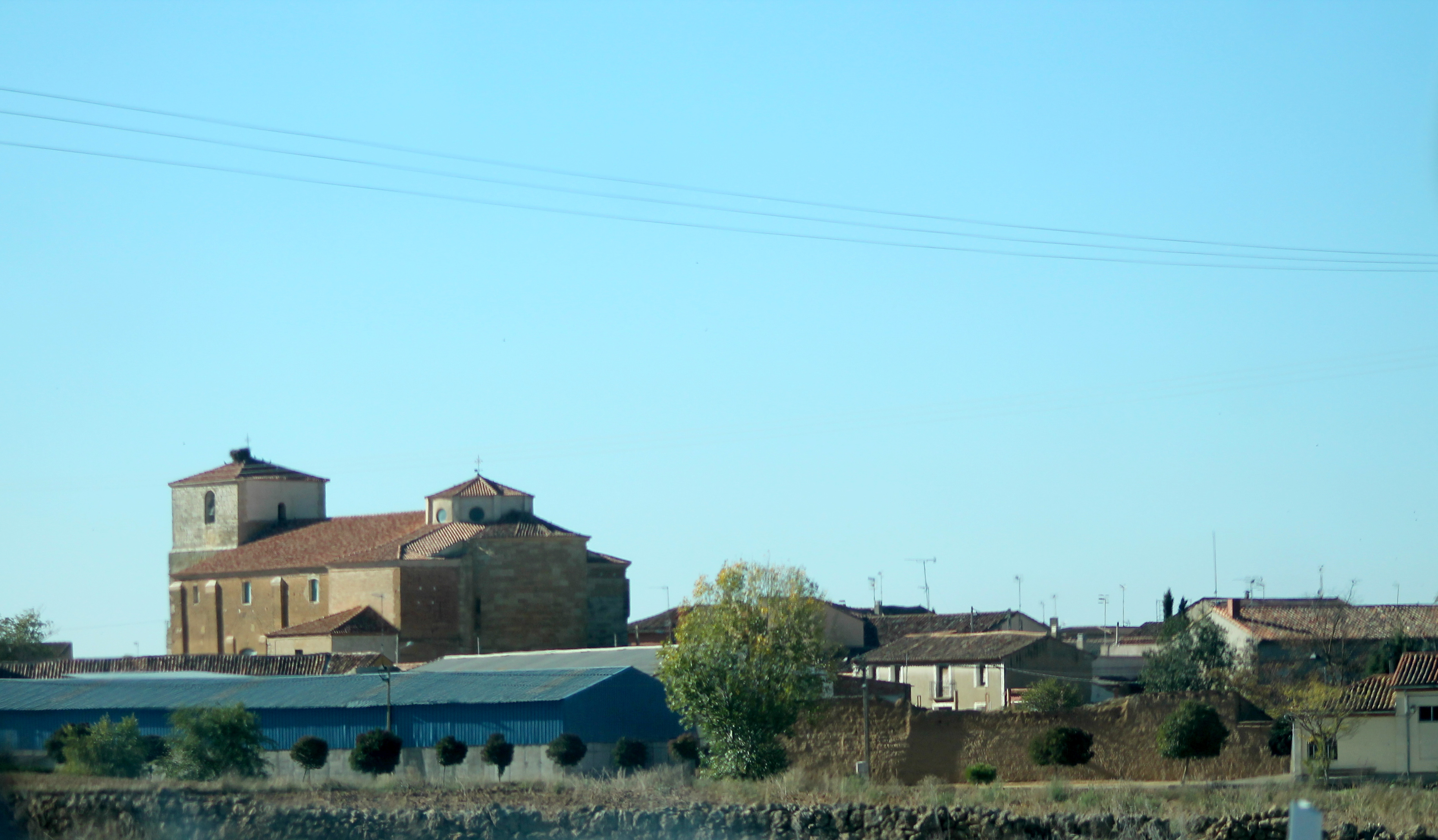
View of Berrueces

Berrueces de Campos is a municipality of 109 people of Valladolid province in the autonomous community of Castile-Leon, Spain. Its major landmark is the local church.
