= Villabaruz de Campos =

Coordinates: 42°01′N 5°00′W

Villabaruz de Campos, Spain
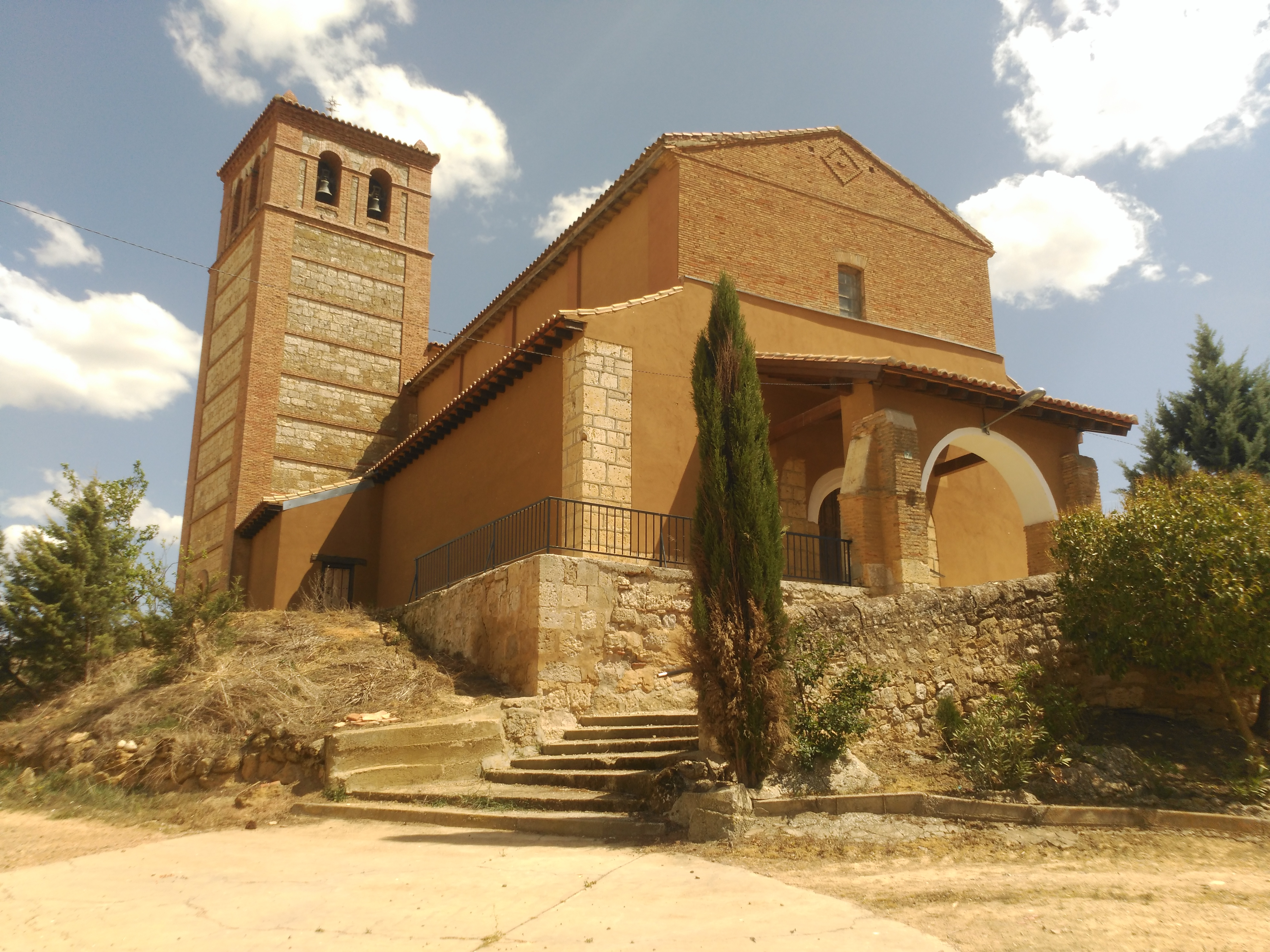
- Church of Our Lady of the Street (XVI-XVII centuries), parish of Villabaruz de Campos, in the province of Valladolid (Spain).
- Interactive map of Villabaruz de Campos, Spain
- Country: Spain
- Autonomous community: Castile and León
- Province: Valladolid
- Municipality: Villabaruz de Campos

Area
  - Total: 16 km^{2} (6.2 sq mi)

Population (2025-01-01)
  - Total: 31
  - Density: 1.9/km^{2} (5.0/sq mi)
- Time zone: UTC+1 (CET)
  - Summer (DST): UTC+2 (CEST)

Villabaruz de Campos is a municipality located in the province of Valladolid, Castile and León, Spain. According to the 2004 census (INE), the municipality has a population of 46 inhabitants.
