= Villárdiga =

Municipality in Castile and León, Spain

Coordinates: 41°49′N 5°28′W

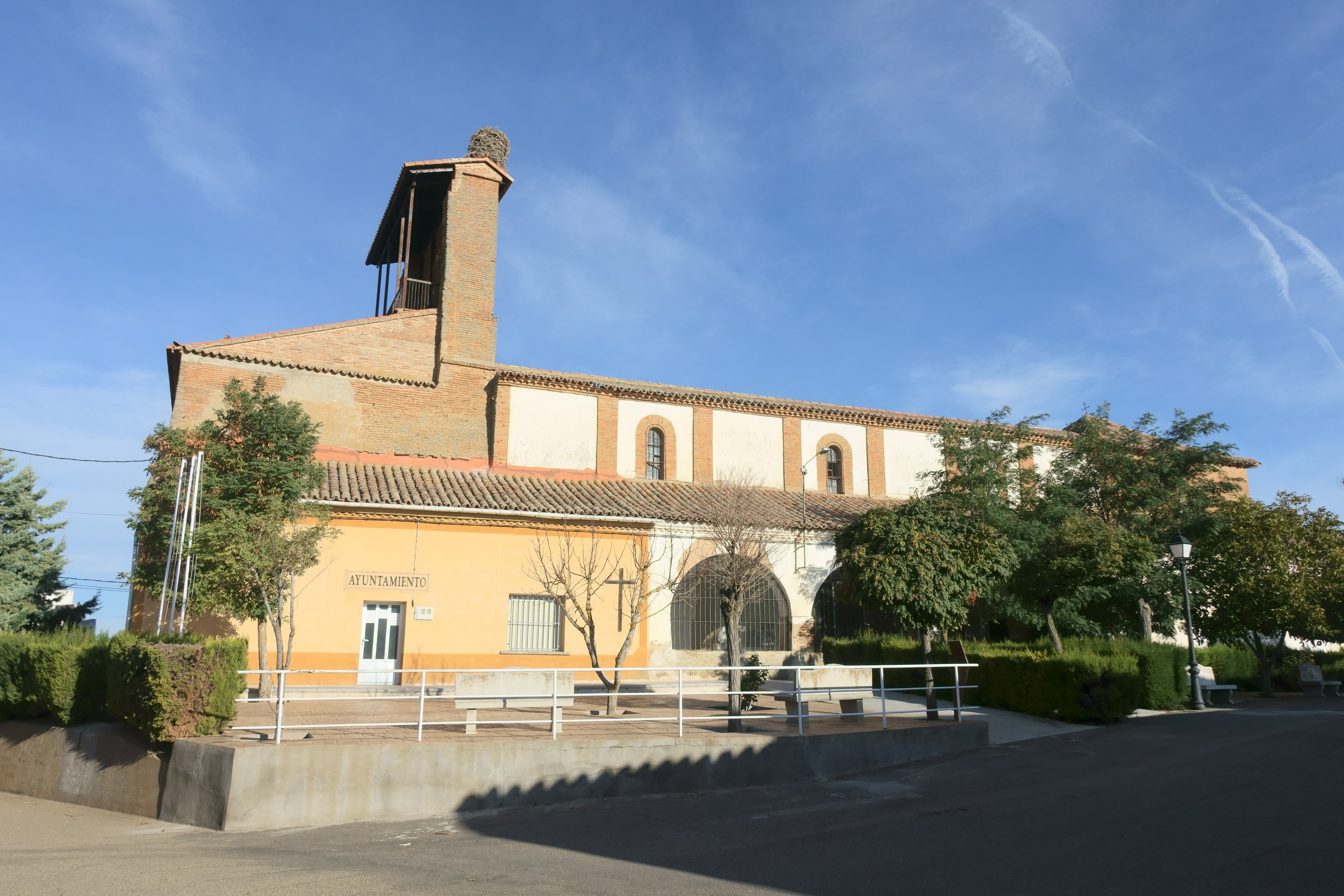
- Interactive map of Villárdiga
- Country: Spain
- Autonomous community: Castile and León
- Province: Zamora
- Municipality: Villárdiga

Area
  - Total: 16.90 km^{2} (6.53 sq mi)
- Elevation: 682 m (2,238 ft)

Population (2025-01-01)
  - Total: 60
  - Density: 3.6/km^{2} (9.2/sq mi)
- Time zone: UTC+1 (CET)
  - Summer (DST): UTC+2 (CEST)

Villárdiga is a municipality located in the province of Zamora, Castile and León, Spain. According to the 2004 census (INE), the municipality has a population of 102 inhabitants.
