= Fontihoyuelo =

Coordinates: 42°10′N 5°03′W

Fontihoyuelo, Spain
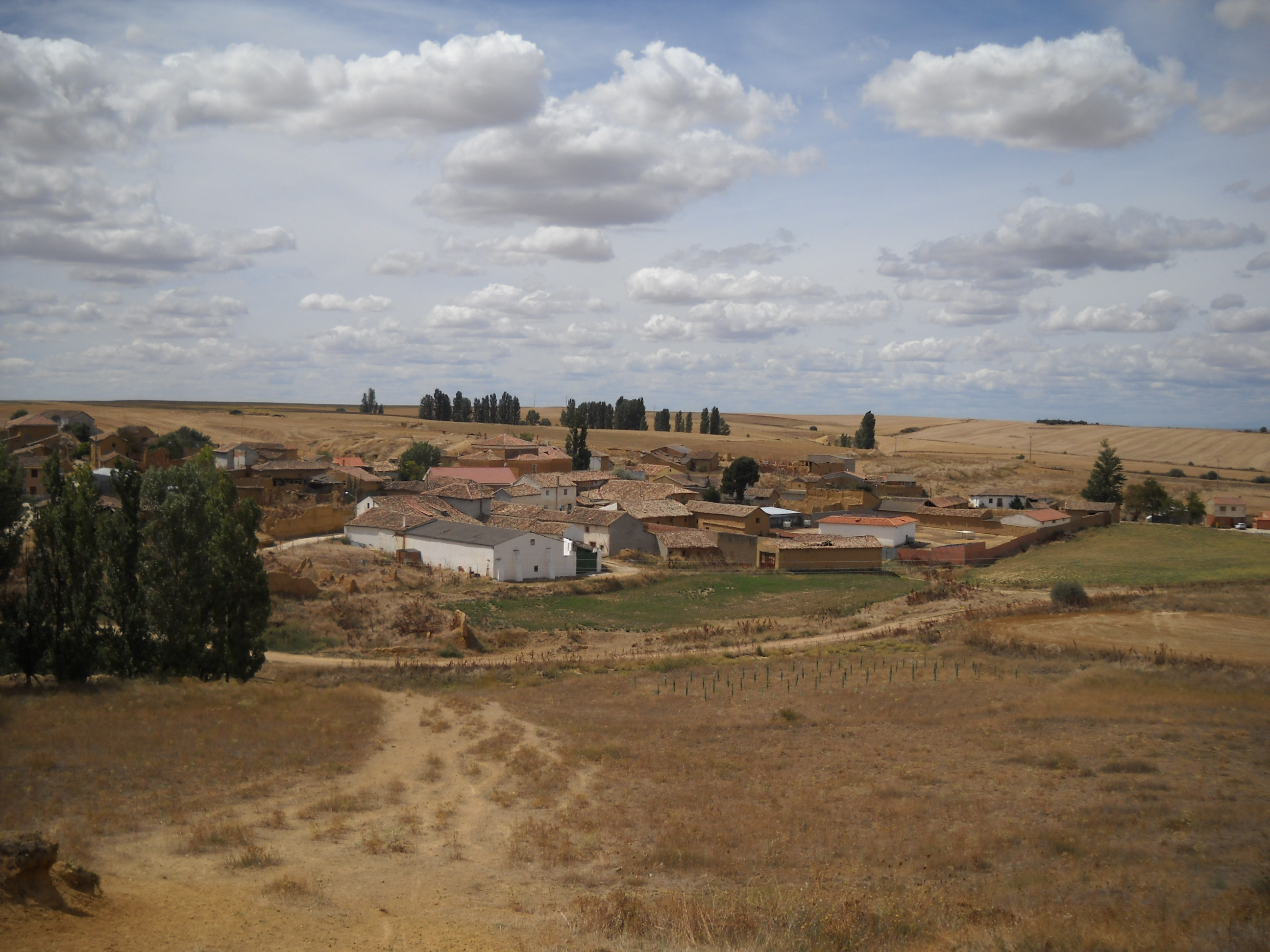
- Panoramic view
- Country: Spain
- Autonomous community: Castile and León
- Province: Valladolid
- Municipality: Fontihoyuelo

Area
  - Total: 16 km^{2} (6.2 sq mi)

Population (2025-01-01)
  - Total: 29
  - Density: 1.8/km^{2} (4.7/sq mi)
- Time zone: UTC+1 (CET)
  - Summer (DST): UTC+2 (CEST)

Fontihoyuelo is a municipality located in the province of Valladolid, Castile and León, Spain. According to the 2021 census (INE), the municipality has a population of 36 inhabitants.
