= Villardefrades =

Coordinates: 41°43′N 5°15′W

Villardefrades, Spain
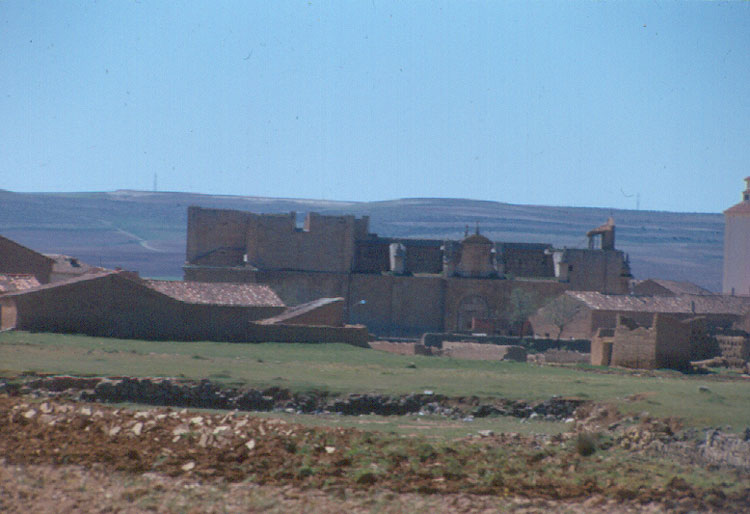
- view
- Country: Spain
- Autonomous community: Castile and León
- Province: Valladolid
- Municipality: Villardefrades

Area
  - Total: 36.41 km^{2} (14.06 sq mi)
- Elevation: 725 m (2,379 ft)

Population (2025-01-01)
  - Total: 145
  - Density: 3.98/km^{2} (10.3/sq mi)
- Time zone: UTC+1 (CET)
  - Summer (DST): UTC+2 (CEST)

Villardefrades is a municipality located in the province of Valladolid, Castile and León, Spain. According to the 2004 census (INE), the municipality had a population of 219 inhabitants.
