= Valverde de Campos =

Coordinates: 41°50′N 5°02′W

Valverde de Campos, Spain
- Coat of arms

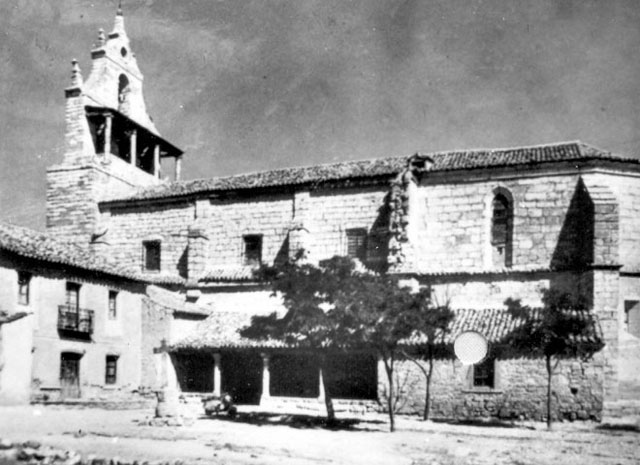
- Church of Santa María
- Country: Spain
- Autonomous community: Castile and León
- Province: Valladolid
- Municipality: Valverde de Campos

Area
  - Total: 21 km^{2} (8.1 sq mi)

Population (2025-01-01)
  - Total: 89
  - Density: 4.2/km^{2} (11/sq mi)
- Time zone: UTC+1 (CET)
  - Summer (DST): UTC+2 (CEST)

Valverde de Campos is a municipality located in the province of Valladolid, Castile and León, Spain. According to the 2004 census (INE), the municipality has a population of 115 inhabitants.
