= Urones de Castroponce =

Coordinates: 42°06′N 5°17′W

Urones de Castroponce, Spain
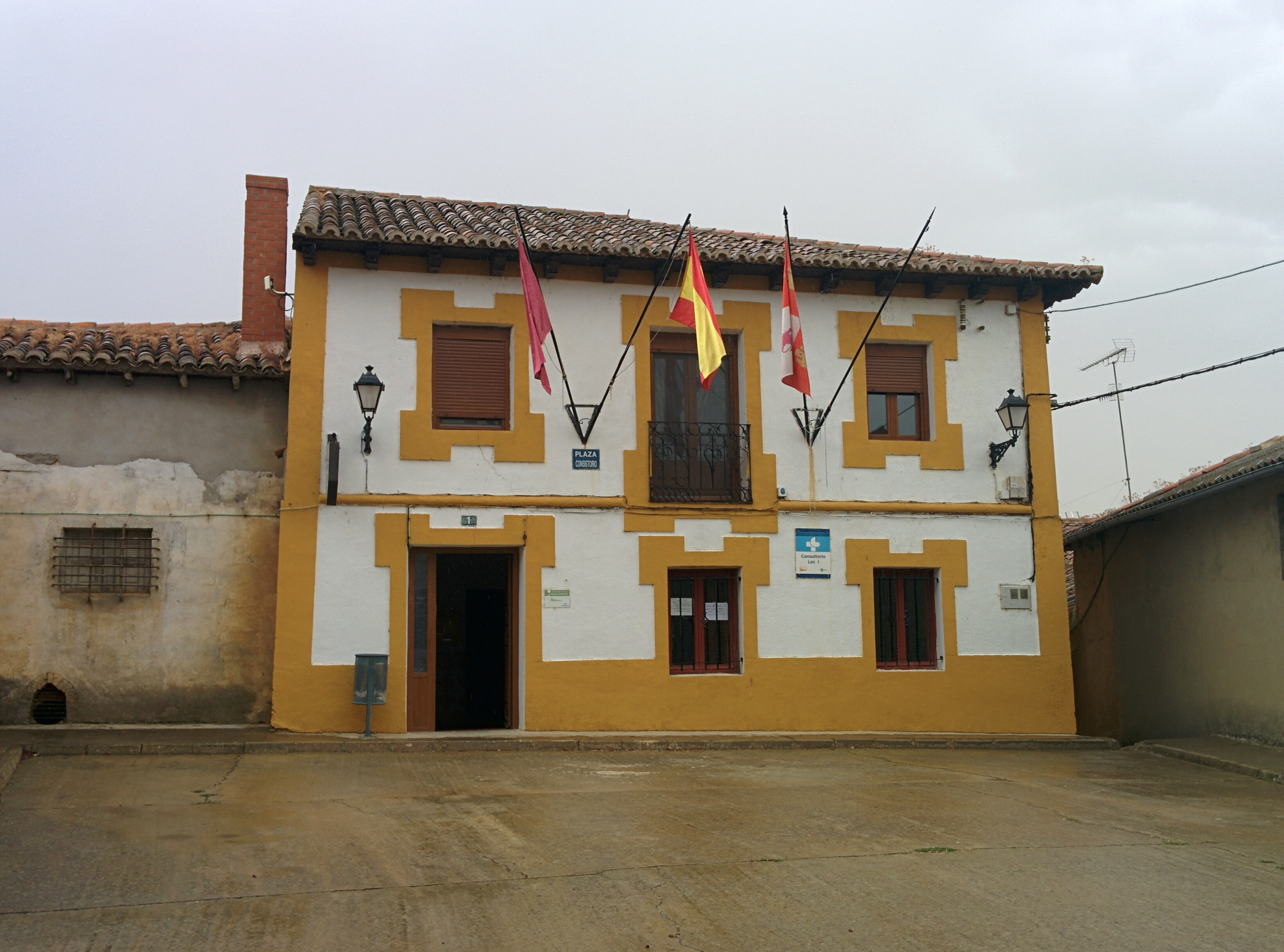
- Town hall of Urones de Castroponce
- Interactive map of Urones de Castroponce, Spain
- Country: Spain
- Autonomous community: Castile and León
- Province: Valladolid
- Municipality: Urones de Castroponce

Area
  - Total: 18 km^{2} (6.9 sq mi)

Population (2025-01-01)
  - Total: 94
  - Density: 5.2/km^{2} (14/sq mi)
- Time zone: UTC+1 (CET)
  - Summer (DST): UTC+2 (CEST)

Urones de Castroponce is a municipality located in the province of Valladolid, Castile and León, Spain. According to the 2004 census (INE), the municipality has a population of 147 inhabitants.
