= Villacarralón =

Coordinates: 42°11′N 5°02′W

Villacarralón, Spain
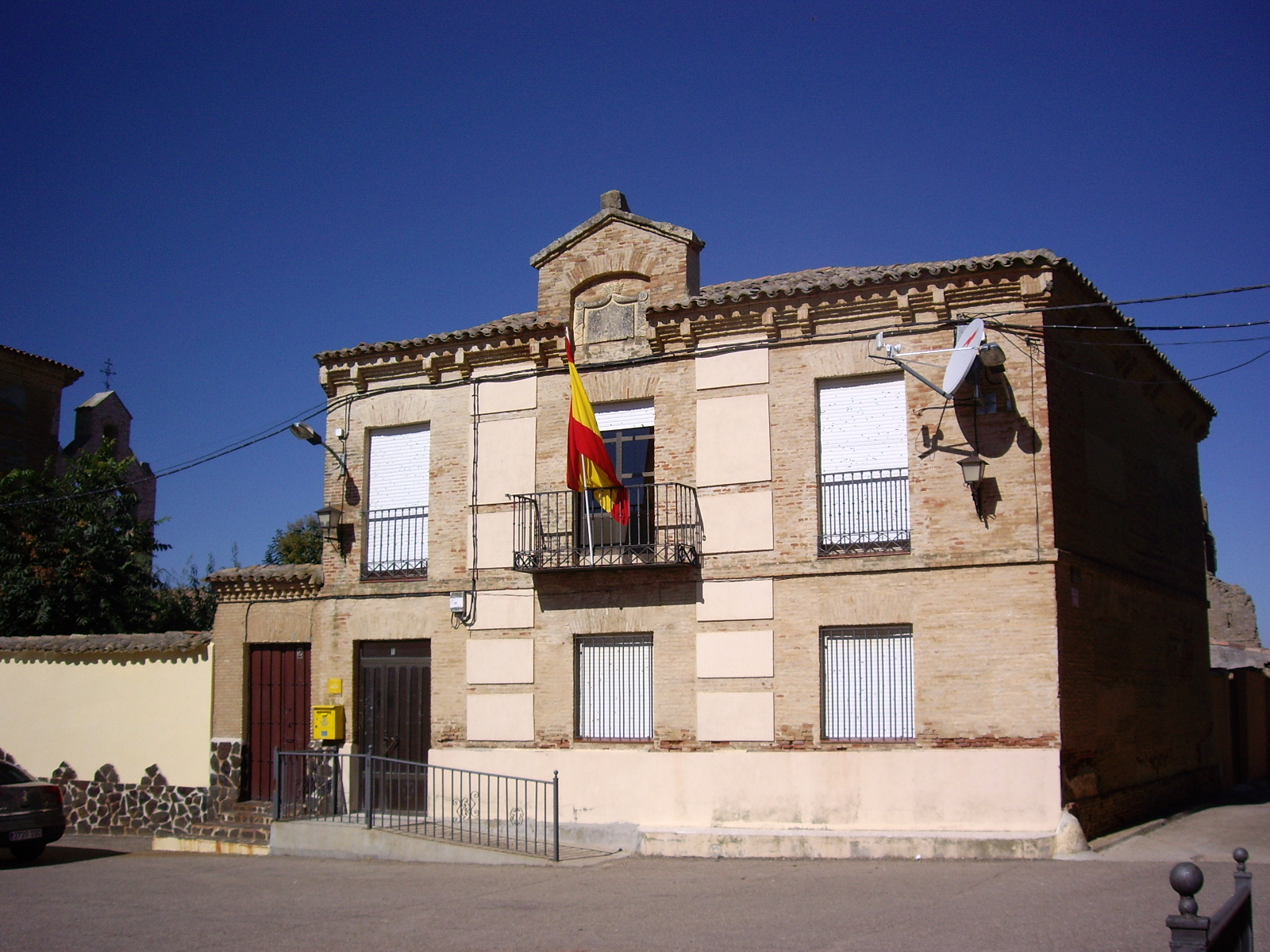
- Town hall
- Country: Spain
- Autonomous community: Castile and León
- Province: Valladolid
- Municipality: Villacarralón

Area
  - Total: 17 km^{2} (6.6 sq mi)

Population (2025-01-01)
  - Total: 71
  - Density: 4.2/km^{2} (11/sq mi)
- Time zone: UTC+1 (CET)
  - Summer (DST): UTC+2 (CEST)

Villacarralón is a municipality located in the province of Valladolid, Castile and León, Spain. According to the 2004 census (INE), the municipality has a population of 89 inhabitants.
