= Belver de los Montes =

Place in Castile and León, Spain

Coordinates: 41°43′N 5°27′W

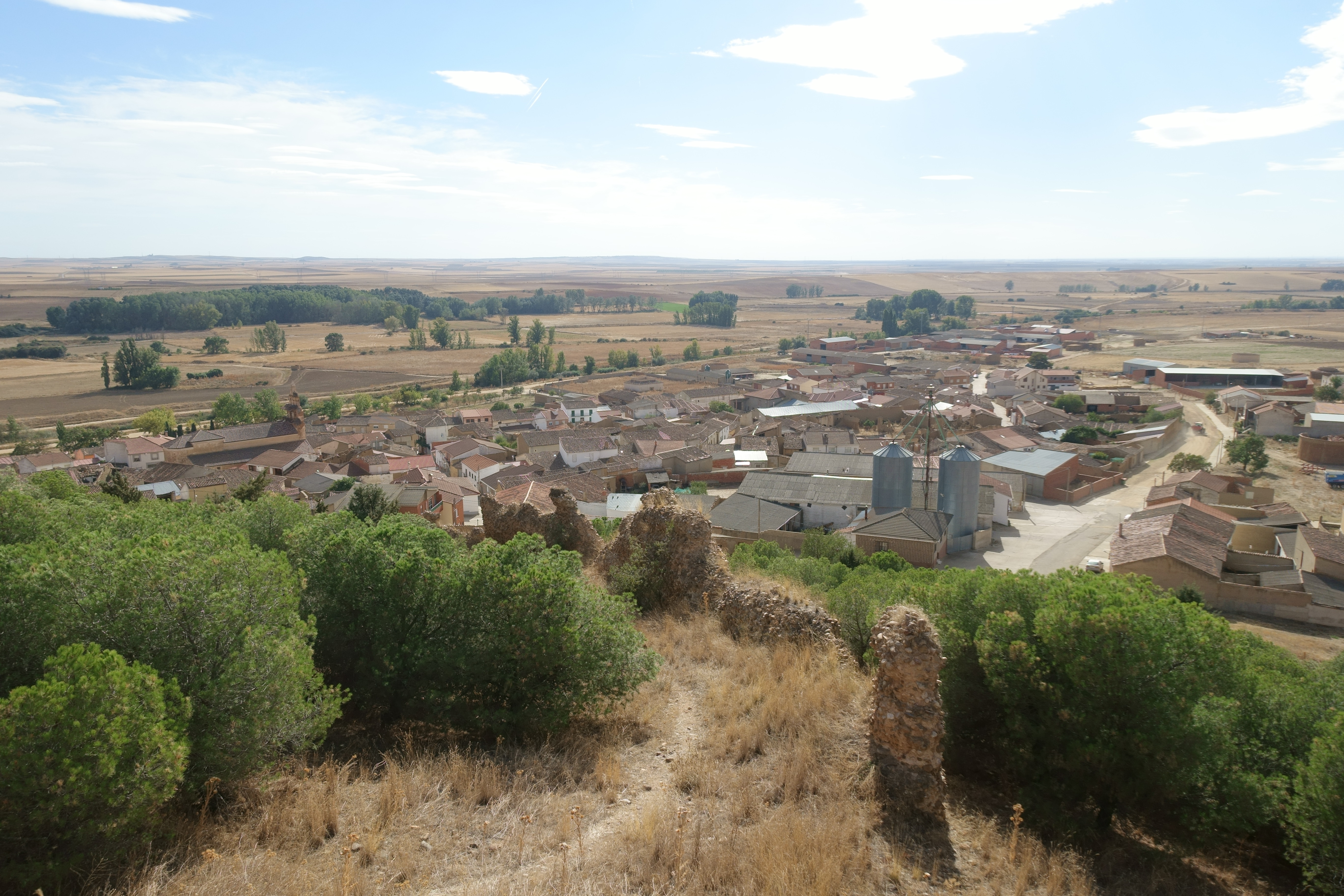

- Flag Coat of arms
- Interactive map of Belver de los Montes
- Country: Spain
- Autonomous community: Castile and León
- Province: Zamora
- Municipality: Belver de los Montes

Area
  - Total: 68 km^{2} (26 sq mi)

Population (2025-01-01)
  - Total: 252
  - Density: 3.7/km^{2} (9.6/sq mi)
- Time zone: UTC+1 (CET)
  - Summer (DST): UTC+2 (CEST)

Belver de los Montes is a municipality located in the province of Zamora, Castile and León, Spain. According to the 2009 census (INE), the municipality has a population of 382 inhabitants.
