= Vega de Ruiponce =

Coordinates: 42°11′N 5°07′W

Vega de Ruiponce, Spain
- Coat of arms
- Interactive map of Vega de Ruiponce, Spain
- Country: Spain
- Autonomous community: Castile and León
- Province: Valladolid
- Municipality: Vega de Ruiponce

Area
  - Total: 31.37 km^{2} (12.11 sq mi)

Population (2025-01-01)
  - Total: 81
  - Density: 2.6/km^{2} (6.7/sq mi)
- Time zone: UTC+1 (CET)
  - Summer (DST): UTC+2 (CEST)

Vega de Ruiponce is a municipality located in the province of Valladolid, Castile and León, Spain. According to the 2004 census (INE), the municipality has a population of 129 inhabitants. Its economy is mainly focused on the primary sector, specifically livestock and agriculture.

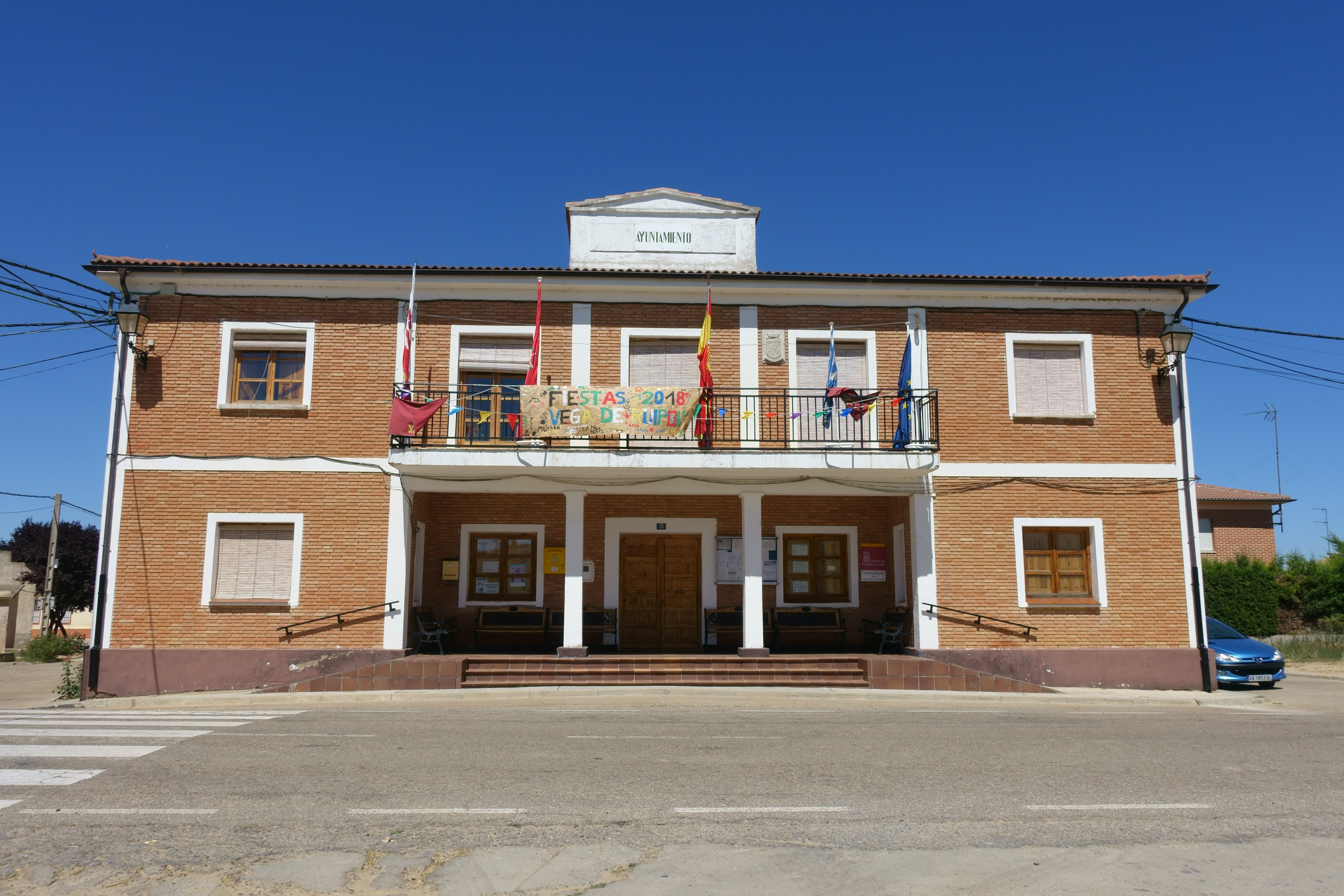
Town Hall Building of Vega de Ruiponce

== Festivities ==
The village celebrates the day of the Holy Cross, in early May, with vespers in the chapel of Vera Cruz and San Roque in mid-August.

== Attractions ==
In the town you will find the 16th-Century Church of San Salvador, with its three naves. In one of the interior altarpieces you will find Alejo de Vahia's masterpiece sculpture of San Blas. In the outskirts of the town there is the chapel of Cristo de la Vera Cruz. Situated nearby the chapel is the so-called 'miracle stone', protagonist of a legend passed down through generations.
