= Villalba de la Lampreana =

Coordinates: 41°45′N 5°38′W

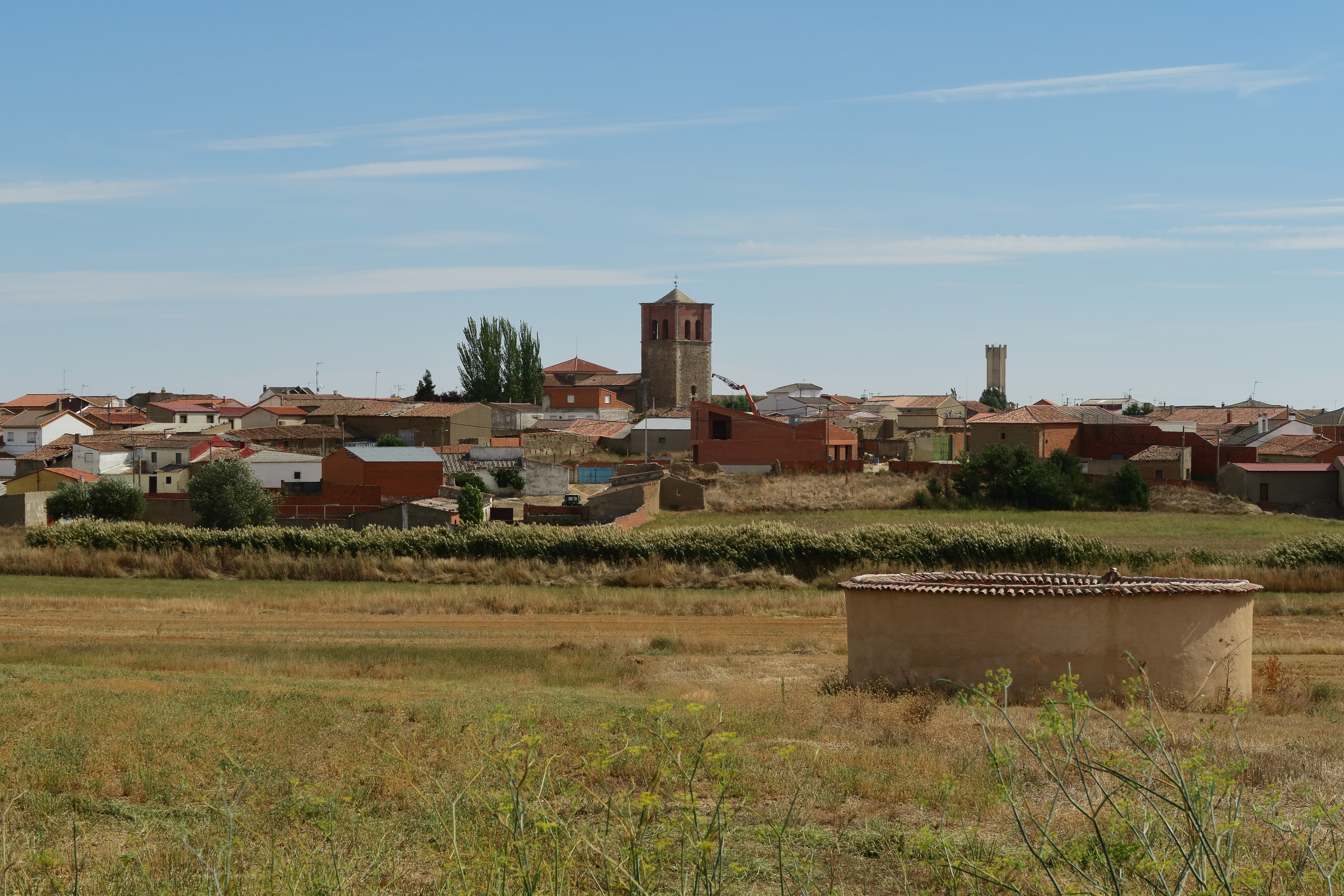

- Flag Coat of arms
- Interactive map of Villalba de la Lampreana
- Country: Spain
- Autonomous community: Castile and León
- Province: Zamora
- Municipality: Villalba de la Lampreana

Area
  - Total: 28 km^{2} (11 sq mi)

Population (2025-01-01)
  - Total: 212
  - Density: 7.6/km^{2} (20/sq mi)
- Time zone: UTC+1 (CET)
  - Summer (DST): UTC+2 (CEST)
- Website: Official website

Villalba de la Lampreana is a municipality located in the province of Zamora, Castile and León, Spain. According to the 2004 census (INE), the municipality has a population of 297 inhabitants.
