= San Esteban del Molar =

Coordinates: 41°56′N 5°33′W

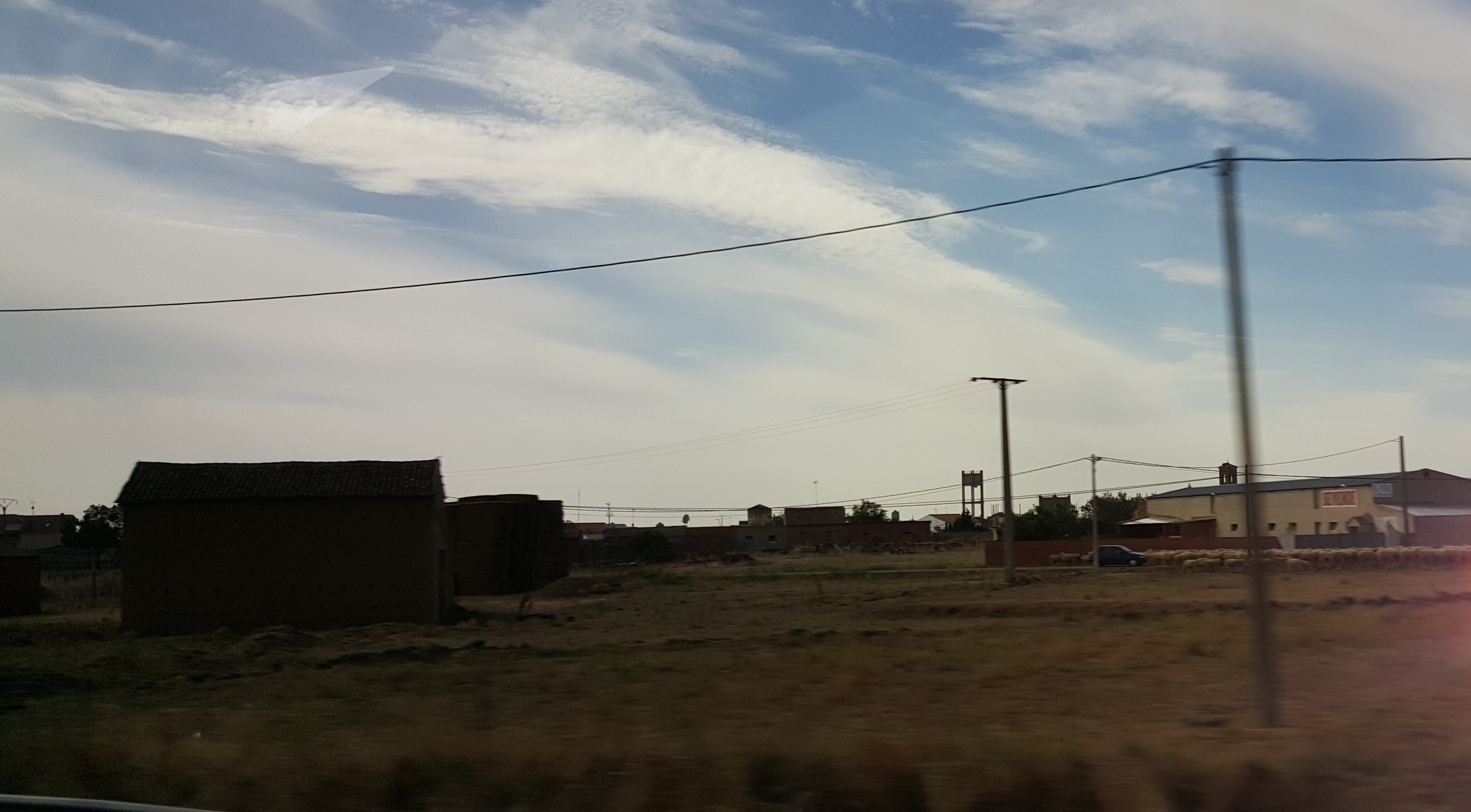

- Flag Coat of arms
- Interactive map of San Esteban del Molar
- Country: Spain
- Autonomous community: Castile and León
- Province: Zamora
- Municipality: San Esteban del Molar

Area
  - Total: 24 km^{2} (9.3 sq mi)

Population (2025-01-01)
  - Total: 117
  - Density: 4.9/km^{2} (13/sq mi)
- Time zone: UTC+1 (CET)
  - Summer (DST): UTC+2 (CEST)

San Esteban del Molar is a municipality located in the province of Zamora, Castile and León, Spain. According to the 2004 census (INE), the municipality has a population of 168 inhabitants.
