= San Agustín del Pozo =

Coordinates: 41°53′N 5°35′W

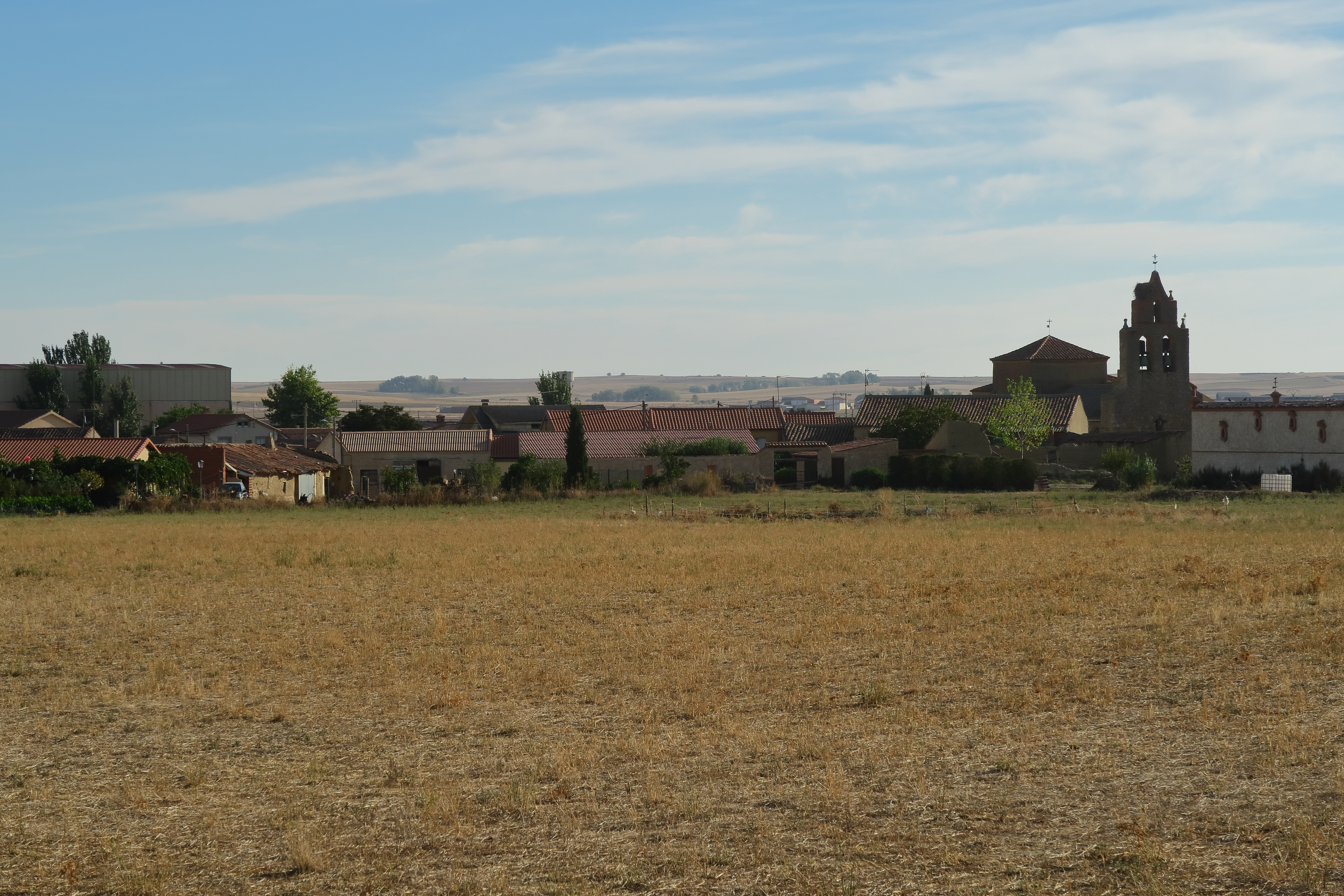
- Interactive map of San Agustín del Pozo
- Country: Spain
- Autonomous community: Castile and León
- Province: Zamora
- Municipality: San Agustín del Pozo

Area
  - Total: 14 km^{2} (5.4 sq mi)

Population (2025-01-01)
  - Total: 163
  - Density: 12/km^{2} (30/sq mi)
- Time zone: UTC+1 (CET)
  - Summer (DST): UTC+2 (CEST)

San Agustín del Pozo is a municipality located in the province of Zamora, Castile and León, Spain. According to the 2004 census (INE), the municipality has a population of 202 inhabitants.
