= Castrobol =

Village in Castile-Leon, Spain

Coordinates: 42°08′N 5°19′W

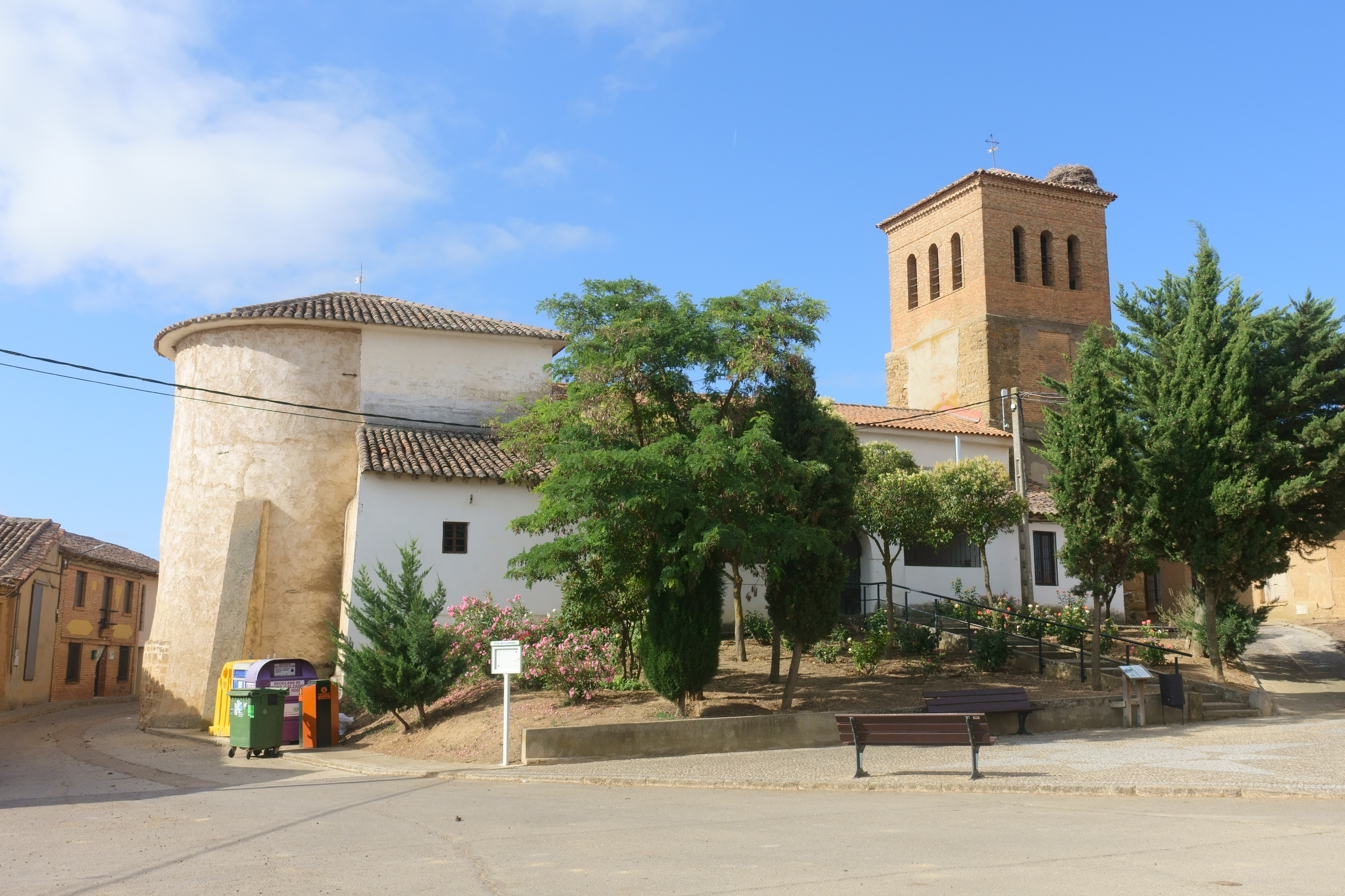

Coat of arms of Castrobol

Castrobol is a village in Valladolid, Castile-Leon, Spain. The municipality covers an area of 16.91 square kilometres (6.53 sq mi) and as of 2011 had a population of 75 people.
