= Villagómez la Nueva =

Coordinates: 42°09′N 5°08′W

Villagómez la Nueva, Spain
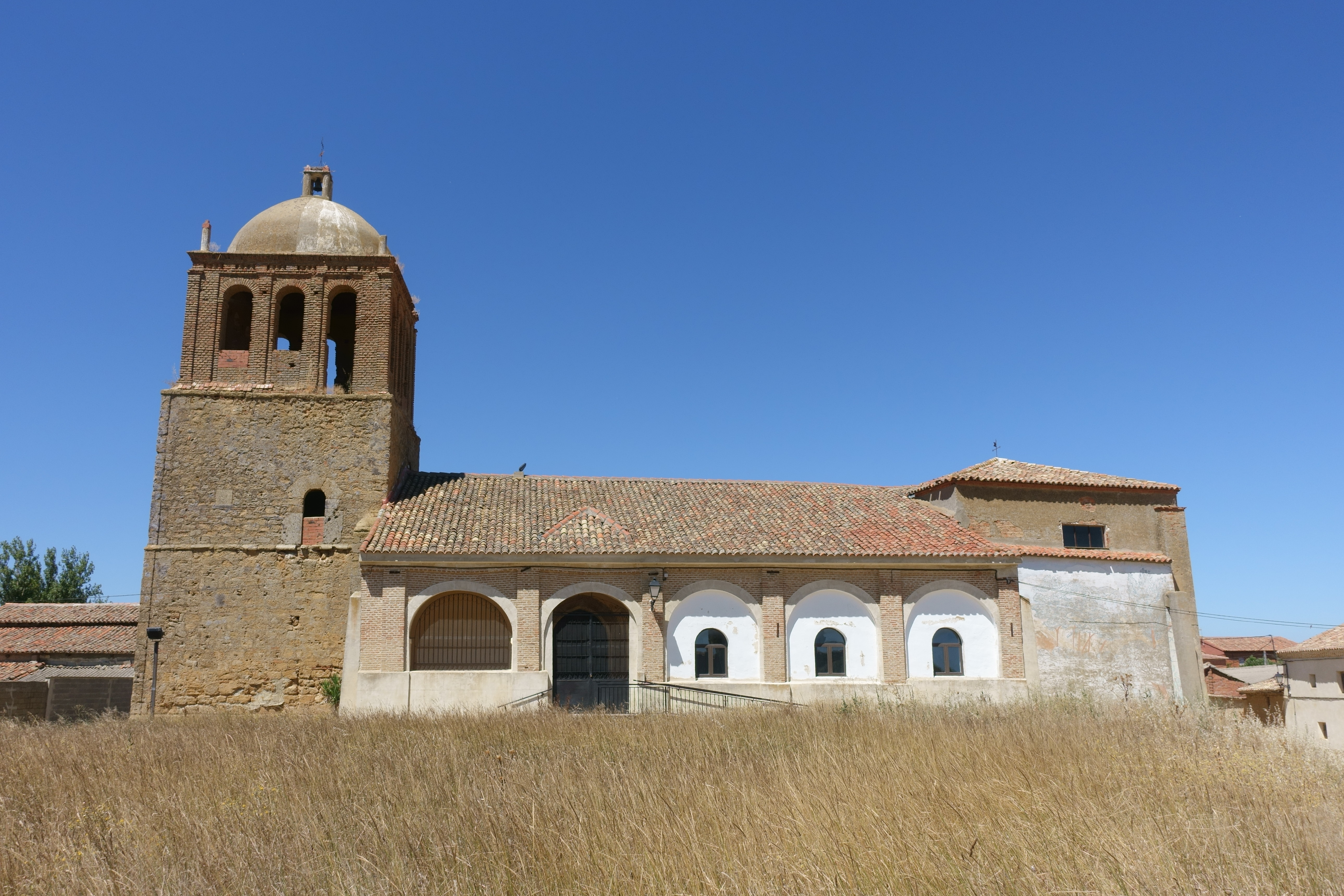
- Church of San Nicolás de Bari, Villagómez la Nueva (Valladolid, Spain).
- Interactive map of Villagómez la Nueva, Spain
- Country: Spain
- Autonomous community: Castile and León
- Province: Valladolid
- Municipality: Villagómez la Nueva

Area
  - Total: 12 km^{2} (4.6 sq mi)

Population (2025-01-01)
  - Total: 46
  - Density: 3.8/km^{2} (9.9/sq mi)
- Time zone: UTC+1 (CET)
  - Summer (DST): UTC+2 (CEST)

Villagómez la Nueva is a municipality located in the province of Valladolid, Castile and León, Spain. According to the 2004 census (INE), the municipality has a population of 87 inhabitants.
