= Revellinos =

Coordinates: 41°53′N 5°34′W

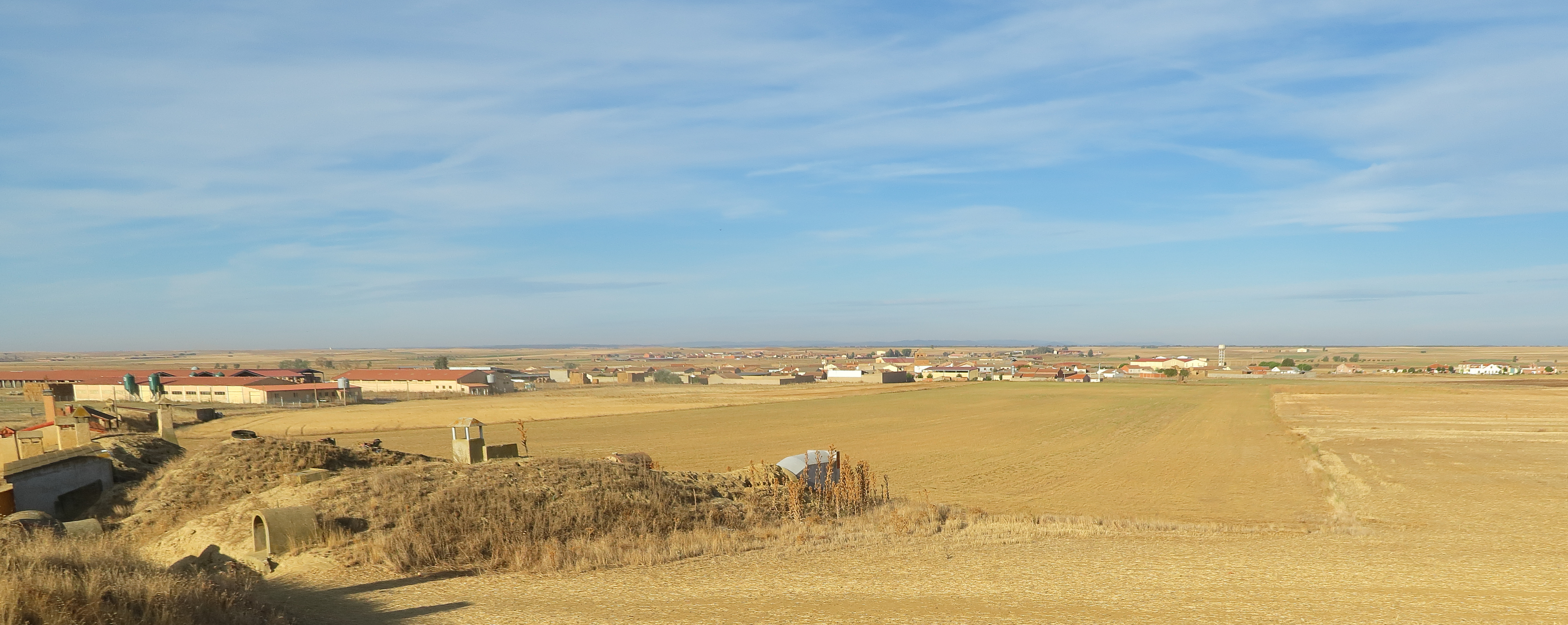

- Flag Coat of arms
- Interactive map of Revellinos
- Country: Spain
- Autonomous community: Castile and León
- Province: Zamora
- Municipality: Revellinos

Area
  - Total: 27 km^{2} (10 sq mi)

Population (2025-01-01)
  - Total: 223
  - Density: 8.3/km^{2} (21/sq mi)
- Time zone: UTC+1 (CET)
  - Summer (DST): UTC+2 (CEST)

Revellinos is a municipality located in the province of Zamora, Castile and León, Spain. According to the 2004 census (INE), the municipality has a population of 310 inhabitants.
