= Villalán de Campos =

Coordinates: 42°01′N 5°14′W

Villalán de Campos, Spain
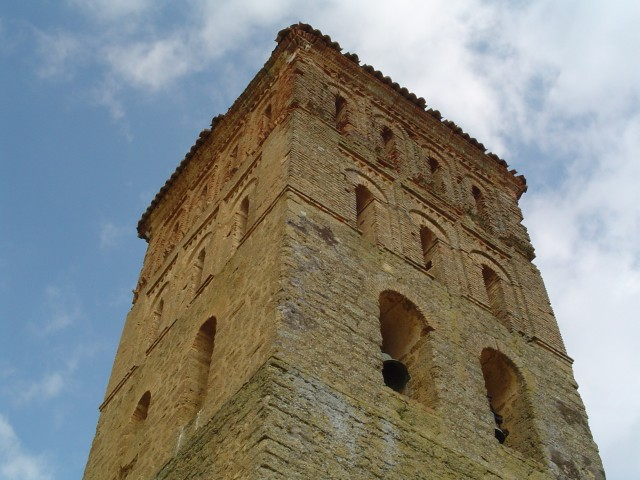
- Country: Spain
- Autonomous community: Castile and León
- Province: Valladolid
- Municipality: Villalán de Campos

Area
  - Total: 18.45 km^{2} (7.12 sq mi)
- Elevation: 754 m (2,474 ft)

Population (2025-01-01)
  - Total: 36
  - Density: 2.0/km^{2} (5.1/sq mi)
- Time zone: UTC+1 (CET)
  - Summer (DST): UTC+2 (CEST)

Villalán de Campos is a municipality located in the province of Valladolid, Castile and León, Spain. According to the 2004 census (INE), the municipality had a population of 52 inhabitants.
