= Villavellid =

Coordinates: 41°42′N 5°16′W

Villavellid, Spain
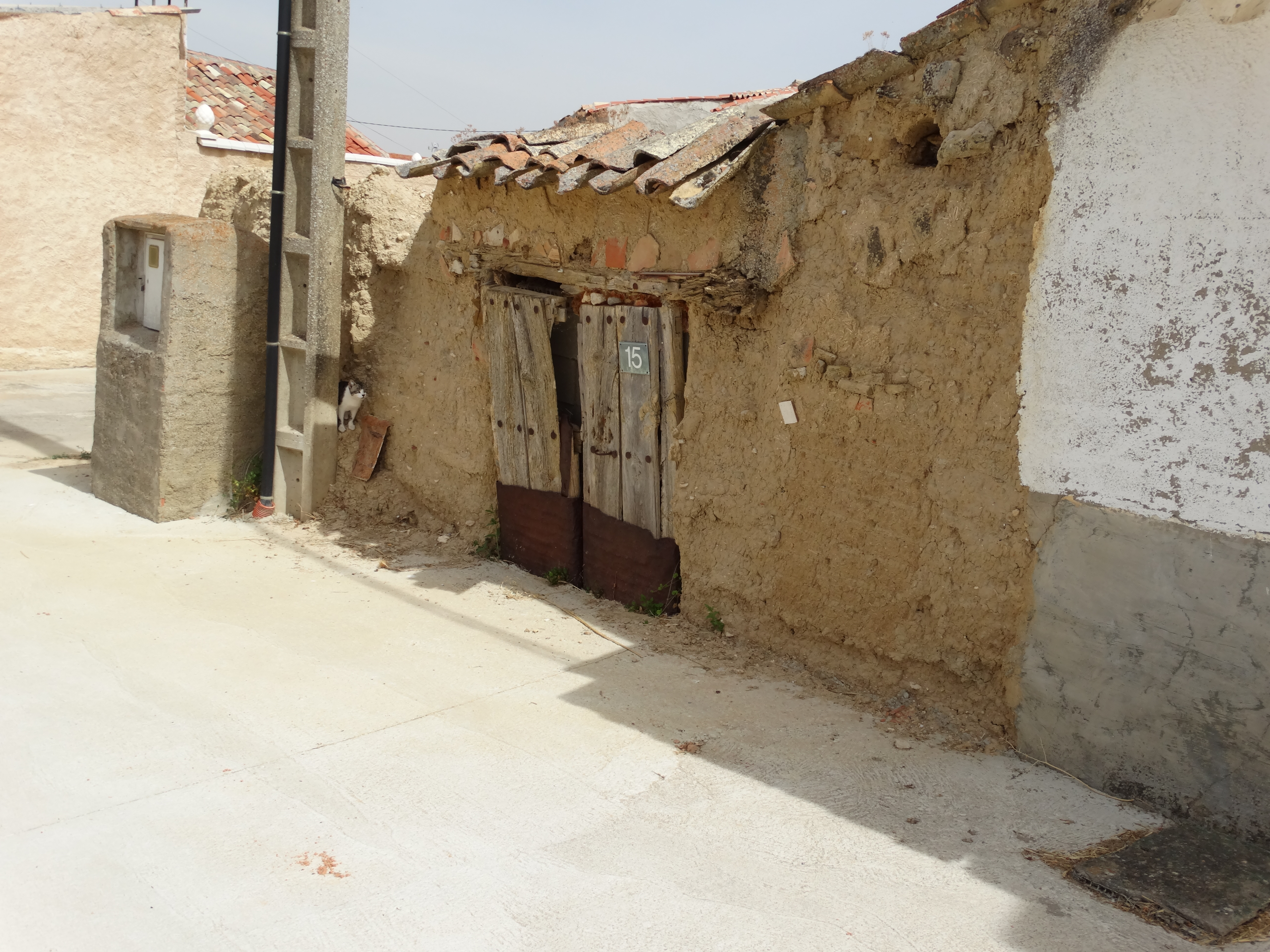

- Coat of arms
- Interactive map of Villavellid, Spain
- Country: Spain
- Autonomous community: Castile and León
- Province: Valladolid
- Municipality: Villavellid

Area
  - Total: 21.71 km^{2} (8.38 sq mi)
- Elevation: 725 m (2,379 ft)

Population (2025-01-01)
  - Total: 51
  - Density: 2.3/km^{2} (6.1/sq mi)
- Time zone: UTC+1 (CET)
  - Summer (DST): UTC+2 (CEST)

Villavellid is a municipality located in the province of Valladolid, Castile and León, Spain. According to the 2004 census (INE), the municipality had a population of 76 inhabitants.
