= La Carballeda =

Region in Spain

Coordinates: 42.0442°N 6.3231°W

Location of the comarca in Zamora Province.

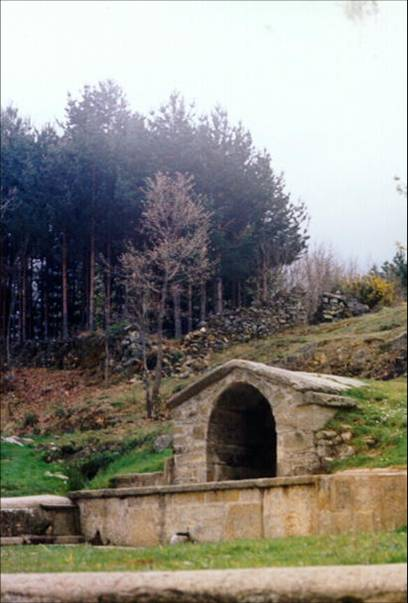
Caño de Villardeciervos.

La Carballeda (Spanish: [la kaɾβaˈʎeða], Asturleonese: La Carbayeda) is a comarca located in the northwest of the province of Zamora, Castilla y León, western Spain. Its area is 1,216.54 km^{2}.

Despite the strong identity of its inhabitants, this historical region has not been able to achieve the necessary legal recognition for its administrative development. Therefore its municipalities have resorted to organizing themselves in mancomunidad, the only legal formula that has allowed the region to manage its public municipal resources meaningfully. The capital of the province is Mombuey and the most populated town is Villardeciervos, even though its population is only 491. The name 'La Carballeda' originated in the great number of Quercus robur oaks, locally known as carballos, in the comarca.

The Sierra de la Culebra mountain range, one of the few areas in Western Europe having a sizeable population of wild wolves, is located in the southwest of the comarca.

== Municipalities ==
Some of the villages included in the historical comarca are part of municipalities which are now included the Sanabria comarca.

- Cernadilla
  - Anta de Tera
  - San Salvador de Palazuelos
  - Valdemerilla
- Espadañedo
  - Carbajales de la Encomienda
  - Farmamontanos de la Sierra
  - Letrillas
  - Utrera de la Encomienda
  - Vega del Castillo
- Justel
  - Quintanilla
  - Villalverde
- Manzanal de Arriba
  - Codesal
  - Folgoso de La Carballeda
  - Linarejos
  - Pedroso
  - Sagallos
  - Sandin
  - Santa Cruz de Los Cuérragos
- Manzanal de los Infantes
  - Donadillo
  - Dornillas
  - Lanseros
  - Otero de Centenos
  - Sejas de Sanabria
- Molezuelas de la Carballeda
- Mombuey
  - Fresno de la Carballeda
  - Valparaíso
- Muelas de los Caballeros
  - Donado
  - Gramedo
- Otero de Bodas
  - Val de Santa María
- Peque
- Rionegro del Puente
  - Santa Eulalia del Río Negro
  - Valleluengo
  - Villar de Farfón
- Villardeciervos
  - Cional
  - Manzanal de Abajo
