= Manzanal =

Manzanal may refer to some places in Castile and León, Spain:

- Manzanal de Arriba, a municipality of the Province of Zamora
- Manzanal de los Infantes, a municipality of the Province of Zamora
- Manzanal del Barco, a municipality of the Province of Zamora
- Manzanal del Puerto, a village of Villagatón, in the Province of León

== See also ==
- Manzana (disambiguation)
