= Santa Cruz de la Sierra, Spain =

Santa Cruz de la Sierra
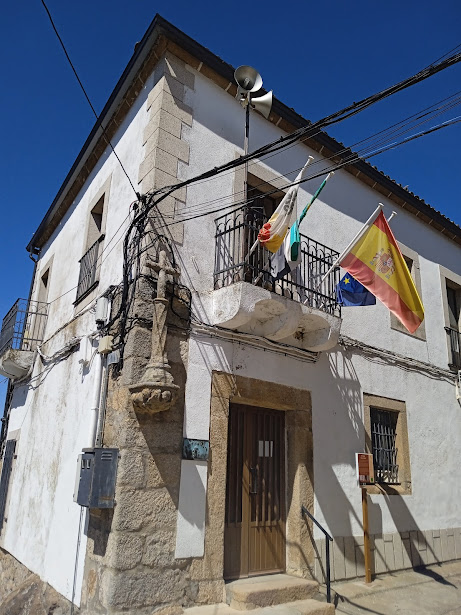
- the municipality hall

- Coat of arms

- Location in Spain
- Coordinates: 39°20′10″N 5°50′47″W
- Country: Spain
- Autonomous community: Extremadura
- Province: Caceres
- Comarca: La Carballeda
- Municipality: Manzanal de Arriba
- Elevation: 716 m (2,349 ft)

Population (2012)
  - Total: 35
- Time zone: CET
  - Summer (DST): CEST
- Area code: (+34) 980

Santa Cruz de la Sierra (Extremaduran: Santa Crus dela Sierra) is a municipality located in the province of Cáceres and autonomous community of Extremadura, Spain. The municipality covers an area of 44.6 square kilometres (17.2 sq mi) and as of 2011 had a population of 278 people.

== Prominent figures ==
- Ñuflo de Chaves was born here and founded the city of Santa Cruz de la Sierra, Bolivia, in 1561.

== See also ==
- List of municipalities in Cáceres
