= Sandin, Zamora =

Sandin
- Flag Seal

- Location within Spain
- Coordinates: 42°0′26.2″N 6°28′45.55″W
- Country: Spain
- Autonomous community: Castile and León
- Province: (Province of Zamora) Zamora
- Comarca: La Carballeda
- Municipality: Manzanal de Arriba
- Elevation: 716 m (2,349 ft)

Population (2020 INE)
  - Total: 33
- Demonym: Sandinés / Sandinesa
- Time zone: UTC+1 (CET)
  - Summer (DST): UTC+2 (CEST)
- Postal code: 49600
- Area code: (+34) 980

Sandín is a Spanish village of the municipality of Manzanal de Arriba, located in the north of the province of Zamora, in the autonomous community of Castile and León. It has 33 inhabitants (as of 2019) and an altitude of 716 meters.

== Overview ==
It is a small village linking it to the municipality of Manzanal de Arriba, located in the natural zone of the Sierra de la Culebra. Town whose low zone underwent the flood caused by the dam of Cernadilla and that took to its inhabitants to the construction of new houses, in the same way that a new parochial temple. Very near next to it is where it meets Portugal.

The village is 65 km to Zamora and 260 km to Madrid.

== Demographics ==
Historical population

Year	Pop.	±%
2000	39	—
2001	41	+5.1%
2002	40	−2.4%
2003	39	−2.5%
2004	42	+7.7%
2005	42	+0.0%
2006	39	−7.1%

Year	Pop.	±%
2007	40	+2.6%
2008	39	−2.5%
2009	41	+5.1%
2010	41	+0.0%
2011	35	−14.6%
2012	35	+0.0%
2013	33	−5.7%

Year	Pop.	±%
2014	30	−9.1%
2015	30	+0.0%
2016	27	−10.0%
2017	31	+14.8%
2018	29	−6.5%
2019	34	+17.2%
2020	33	−2.9%

- Population (2000-2020) Residential population according to the Census
- 2011 Population by local area census

== See also ==
- Benavente
- San Pedro de Zamudia
- List of municipalities in Zamora
