= Justellus =

Justellus, Justel is a surname. Notable people with the surname include:

- Ana Justel, Spanish statistician and Antarctic scientist
- Christophe Justel (1580–1649), French scholar
- Henri Justel (1619–1693), French scholar, royal administrator, bibliophile, and librarian, son of Christophe
