= Nogarejas (Spain) =

Nogarejas, Spain
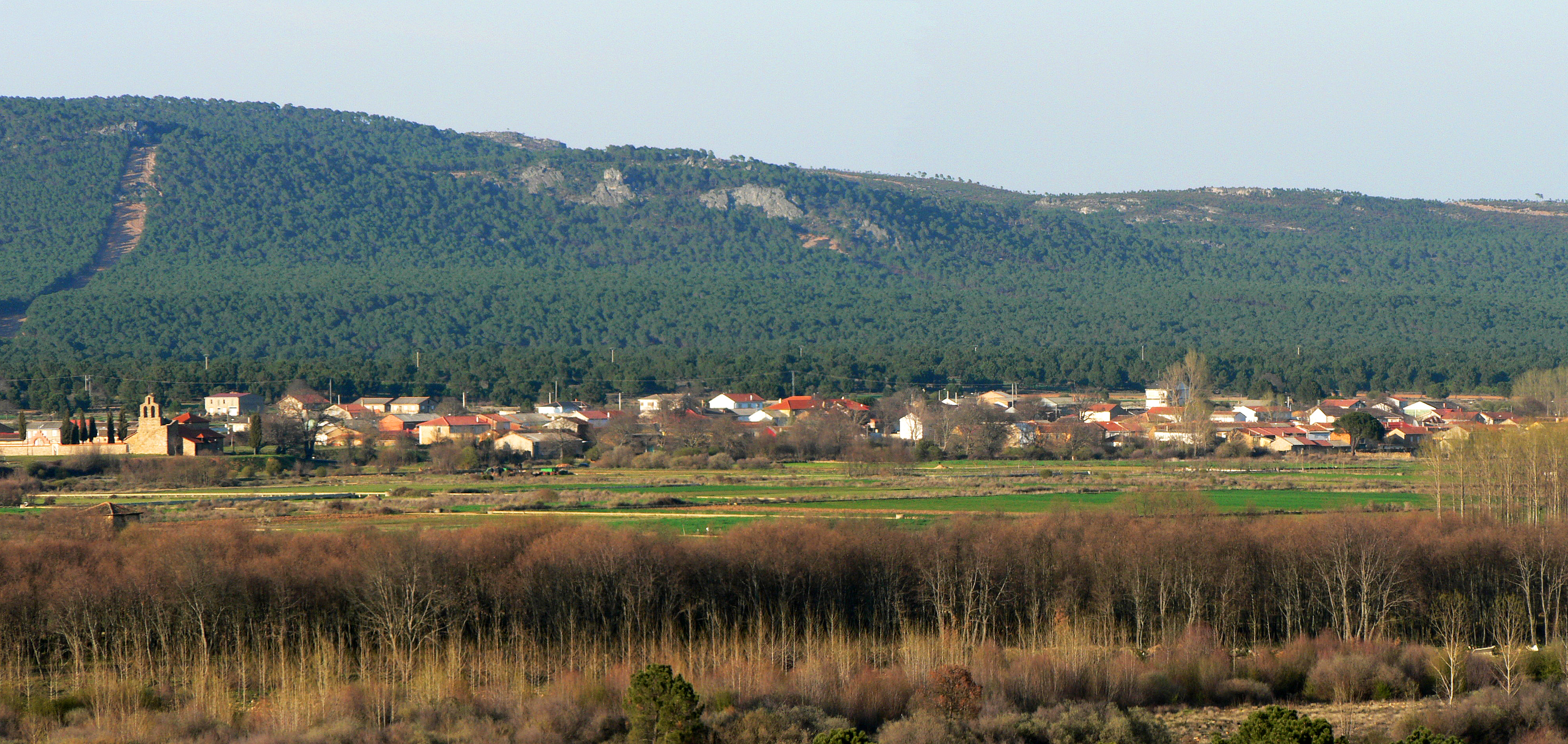
- Panoramic view of Nogarejas, from the South

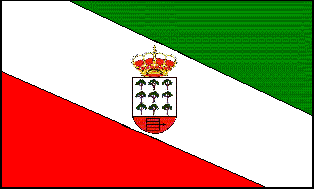
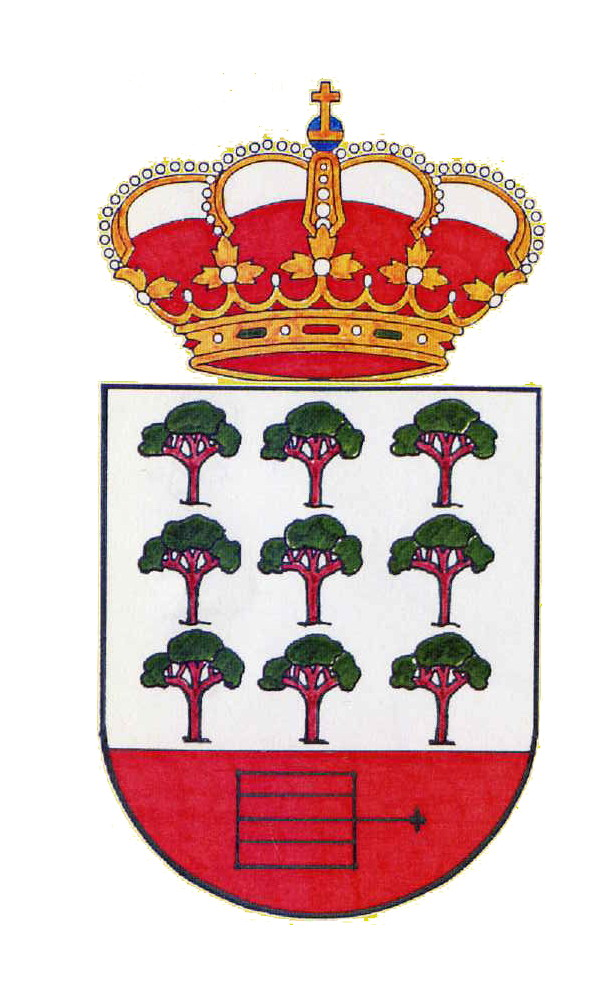
- Flag Coat of arms

- Location within Spain
- Coordinates: 42°11′22″N 6°08′20″W
- Country: Spain
- Autonomous community: Castile and León
- Province: León
- Municipality: Castrocontrigo
- Elevation: 920 m (3,020 ft)

Population (2011)
  - Total: 286
- Time zone: UTC+1 (CET)
  - Summer (DST): UTC+2 (CEST)
- Postal Code: 24734
- Telephone prefix: 987

Nogarejas, also Nogarejas de la Valdería. Village in the municipality of Castrocontrigo, in the South-West area of the Province of León, Spain. The road LE-125 (La Bañeza to Puebla de Sanabria) drives to Nogarejas, and also the LE-133, getting there from the South and the village of Rionegro del Puente (Zamora, Spain). The river Codes crosses the village from the North-West, just before flowing into the River Eria, which gives its name to the whole region (Valderia: Val d’Eria or Eria Valley).

In the year 2009 it counted 298 inhabitants.

== Origins ==
The findings of tégulas allow to assert that in the place there were Roman settlements. And the existence of the village of Nogarejas is documented from, at least, 1159.

In June 1199, there is a “litterae executoria” of Pope Innocent III in relation to a claim on the payment of tithes between the Bishop of Astorga and the monastery of San Esteban de Nogales.

It seems that, for many centuries, a few shepherds from the nearby village of San Esteban de Nogales, travelled to the Eria River and streams that converge in search of pastures for their livestock, during the summer. The prairies so occupied were called “Nogalejas” because of their origin of (San Esteban de) Nogales.

And, according to Paramio, toponymic evidence suggests that the inhabitants of San Esteban de Nogales had to do with the founding of the town, whose name would be evolving from “Nogarelas” to “Nogareyas” and finally “Nogarexas”, before the current Nogarejas.

According to Vicenta Fernandez Marcos the voice of Nogarejas is a derivative of “nogal“, whose diminutive suffix, which has a derogatory value, comes from the Latin - ecula. This voice is credited the meaning of walnut.

The Modern Age has been especially useful to provide information on the history of Nogarejas, whose economy was farming, was organized politically through councils, with mayors at front, and fought their independence at that time from the Corregidor of Castrocalbón.

== Local Economy ==
The lands of Nogarejas belonged to the House of Alba y Aliste, even after the abolition of Lordships. Already in the 20th century the economy was based on the resin exploitation of its pine forests, reaching two resin factories in production simultaneously. Currently both factories are closed.

== Gallery ==
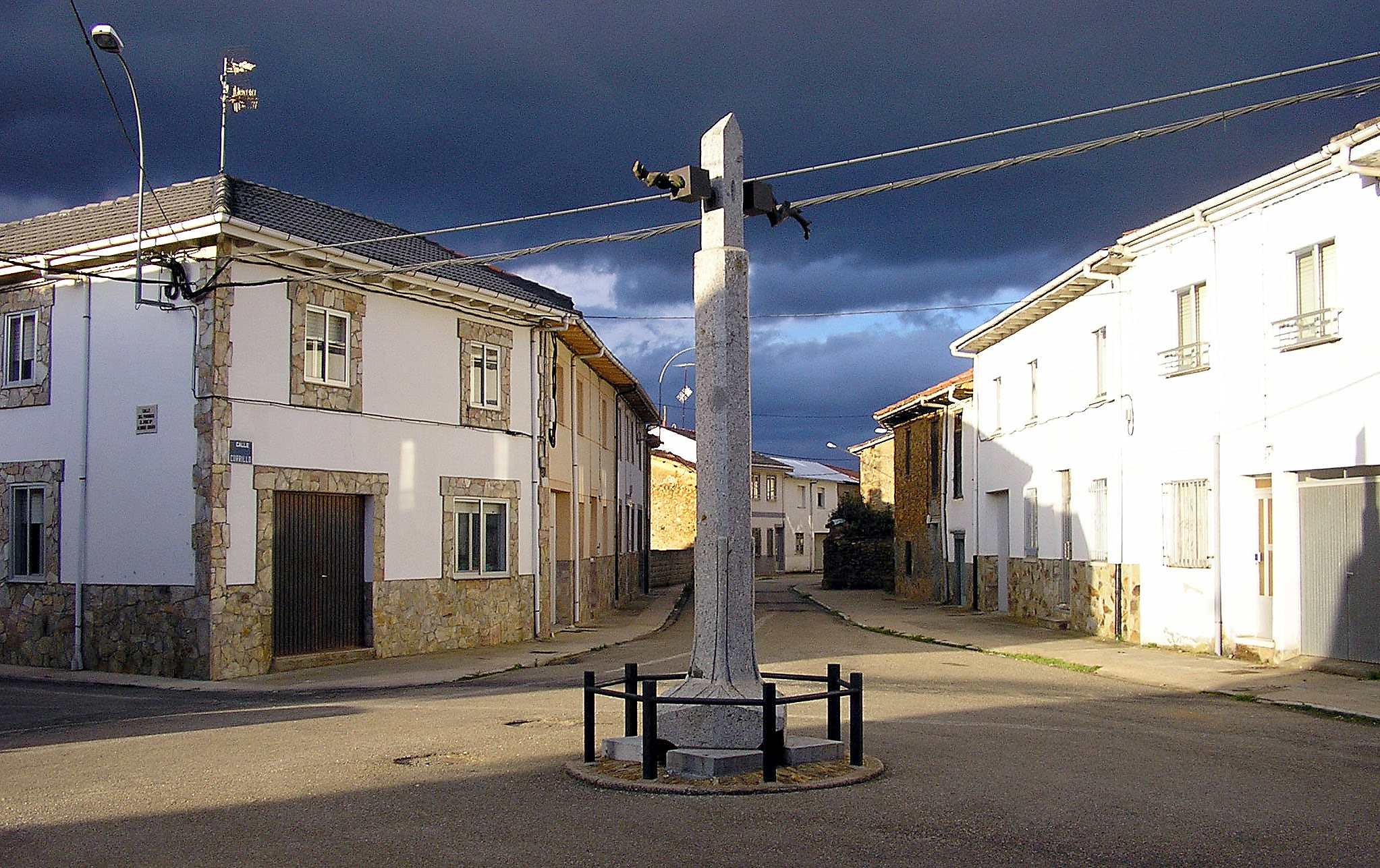
The Cross

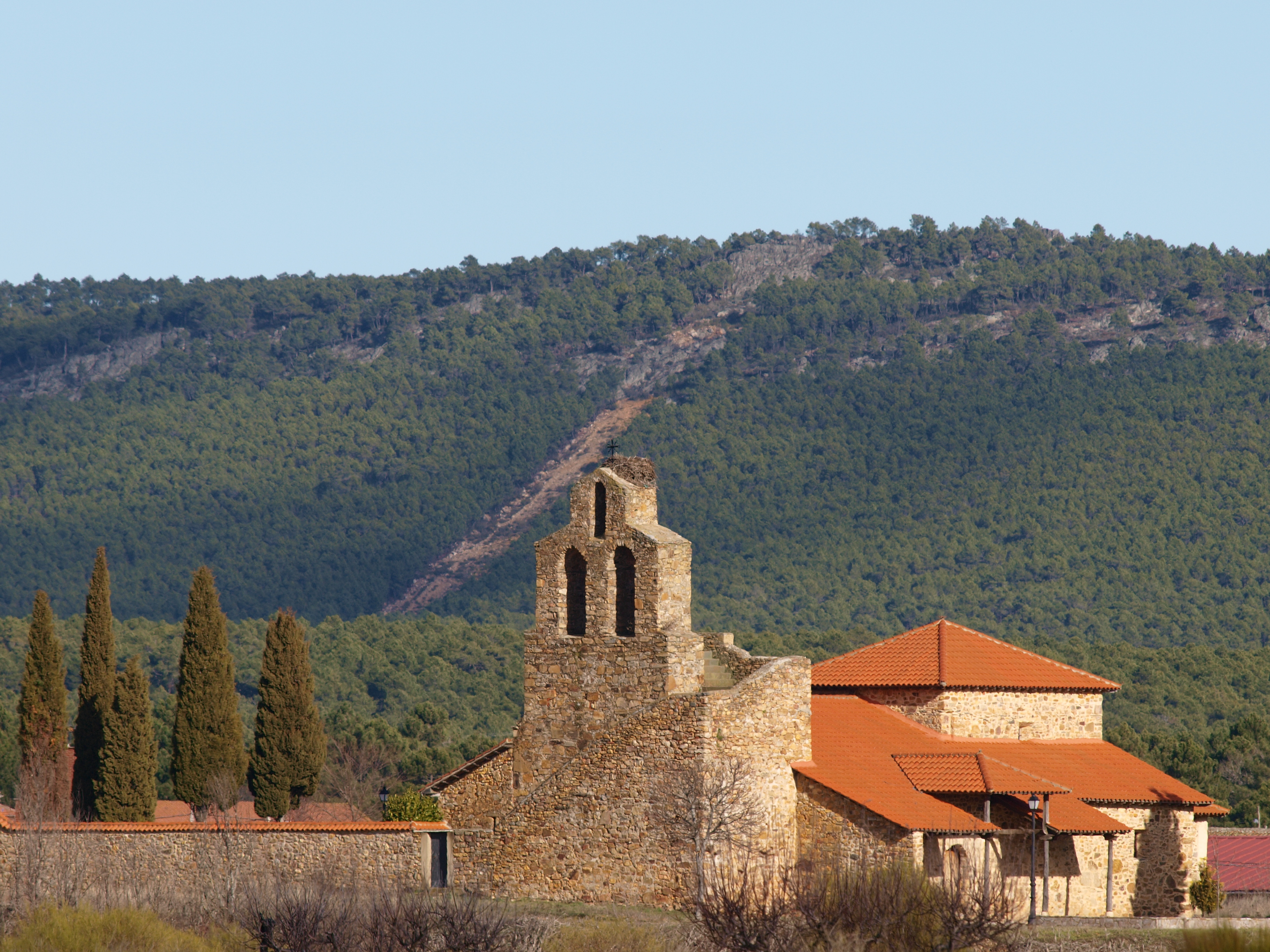
La Ermita

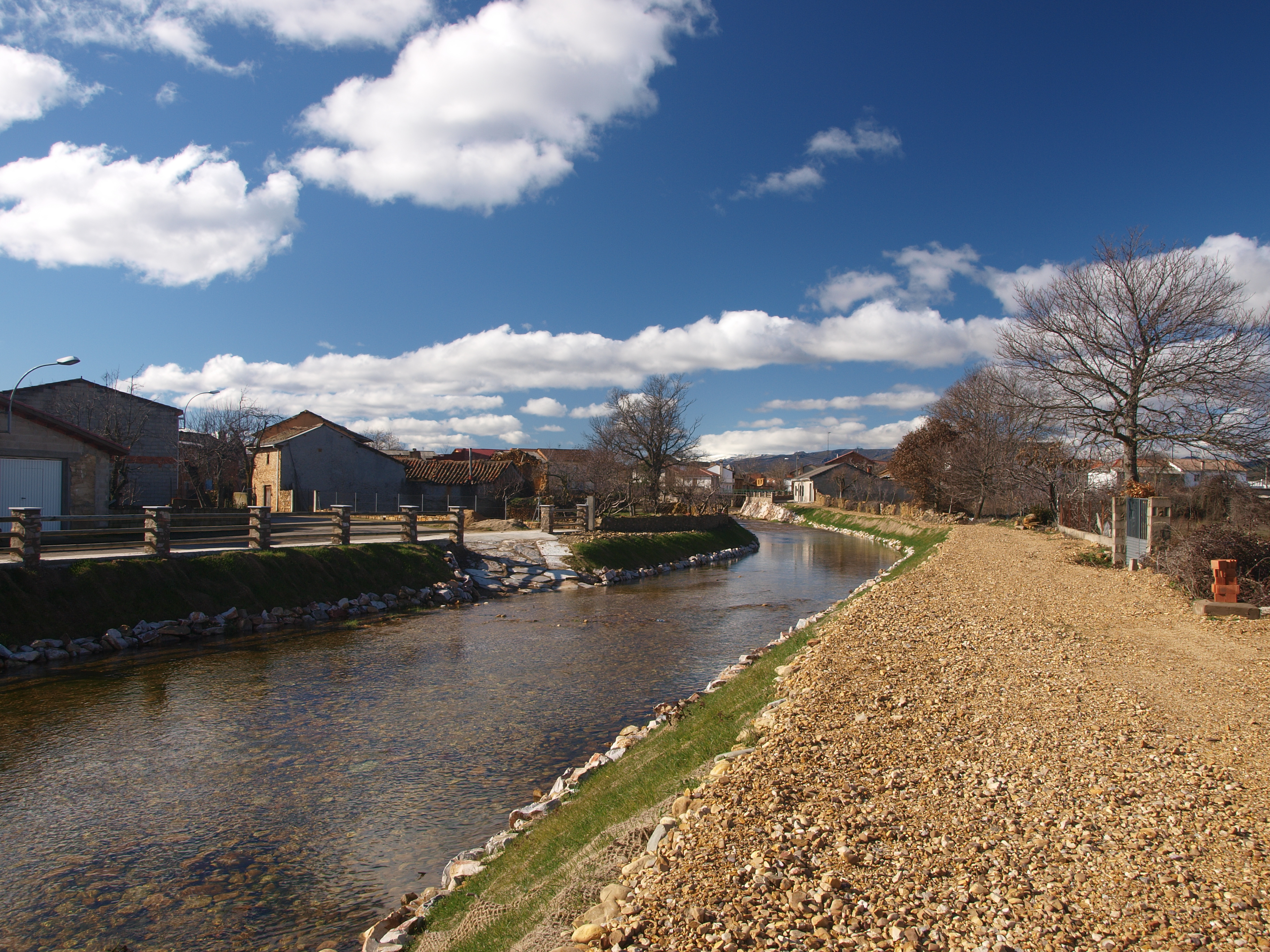
River Codes

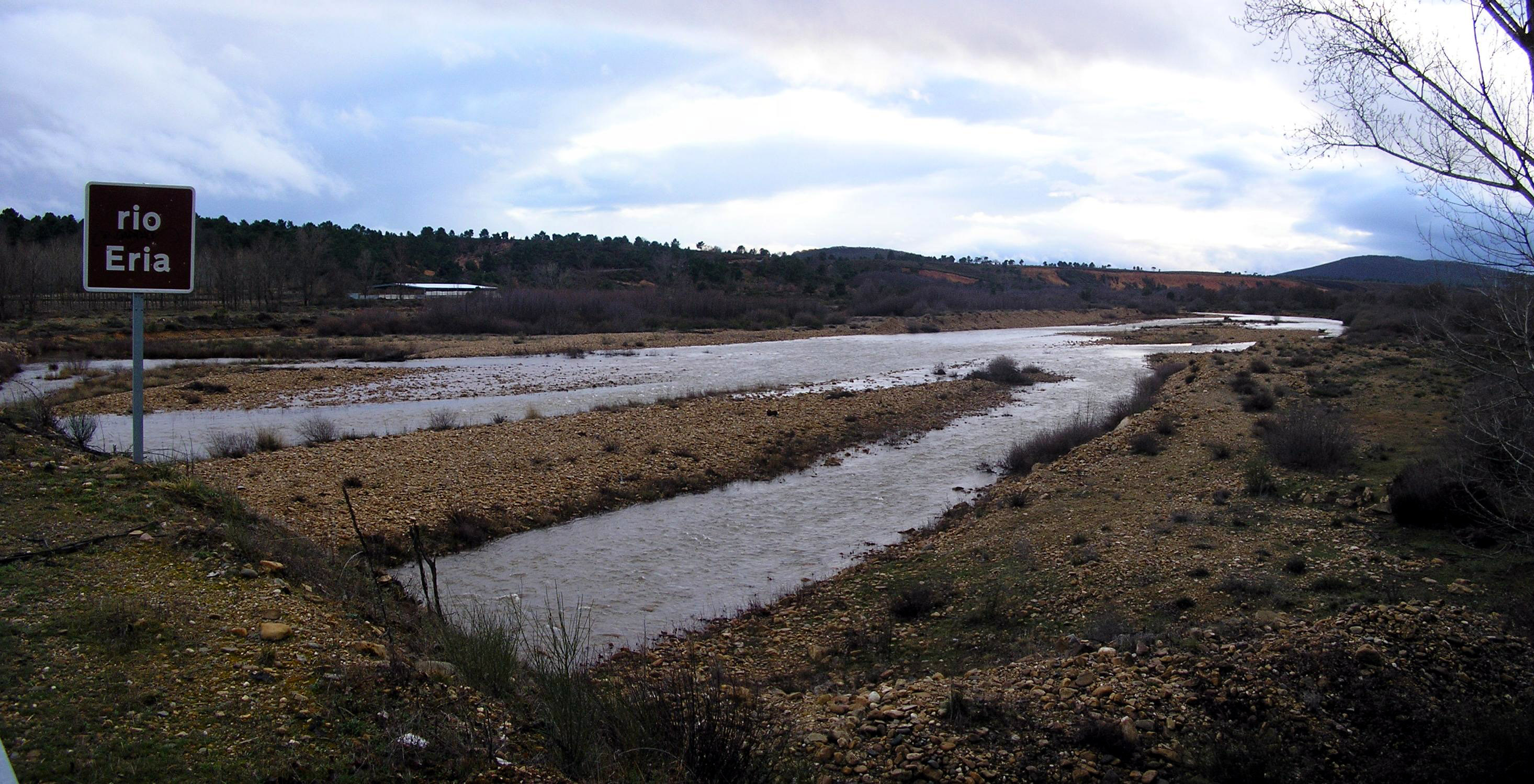
River Eria

== Links ==
- Web of the Council of Nogarejas
