= Molezuelas de la Carballeda =

Coordinates: 42°05′N 6°11′W

- Interactive map of Molezuelas de la Carballeda
- Country: Spain
- Autonomous community: Castile and León
- Province: Zamora
- Municipality: Molezuelas de la Carballeda

Area
  - Total: 34 km^{2} (13 sq mi)

Population (2025-01-01)
  - Total: 47
  - Density: 1.4/km^{2} (3.6/sq mi)
- Time zone: UTC+1 (CET)
  - Summer (DST): UTC+2 (CEST)

Molezuelas de la Carballeda is a municipality located in the province of Zamora, Castile and León, Spain. According to the 2004 census (INE), the municipality has a population of 87 inhabitants.

== See also ==
- La Carballeda
