= Castrocontrigo =

Castrocontrigo, Spain
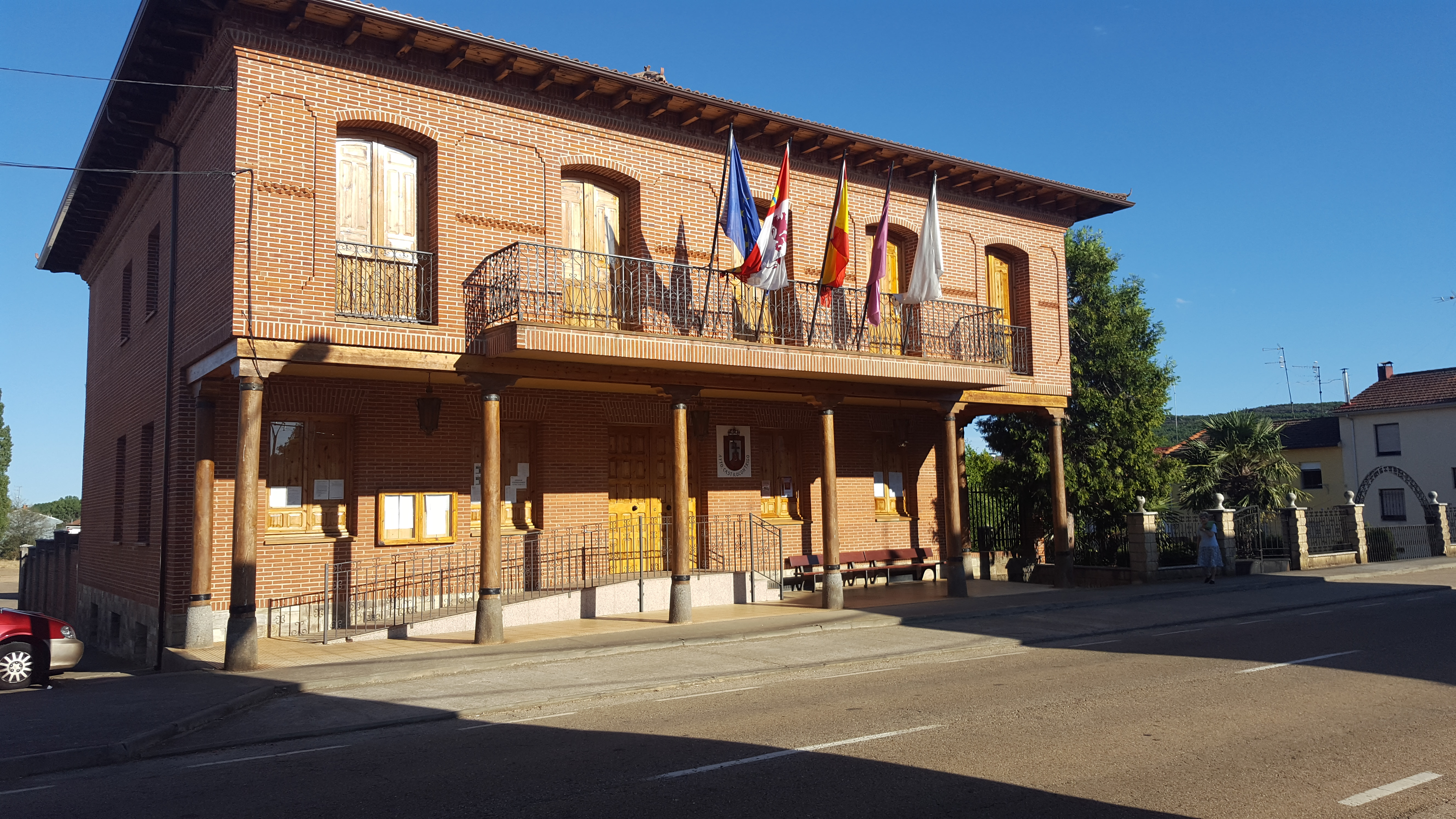
- Town hall

- Flag Coat of arms

- Location within Spain
- Coordinates: 42°10′58″N 6°11′18″W
- Country: Spain
- Autonomous community: Castile and León
- Province: León
- Municipality: Castrocontrigo

Government
  - Mayor: Aureliano Manuel Fernández Justel (PP)

Area
  - Total: 194.49 km^{2} (75.09 sq mi)
- Elevation: 911 m (2,989 ft)

Population (2025-01-01)
  - Total: 623
  - Density: 3.20/km^{2} (8.30/sq mi)
- Demonym(s): castrejo, castreja
- Time zone: UTC+1 (CET)
  - Summer (DST): UTC+2 (CEST)
- Postal Code: 24735
- Telephone prefix: 987

Castrocontrigo (Spanish pronunciation: [ˈkastɾokonˈtɾiɣo]) is a municipality located in the province of León, Castile and León, Spain, 80 km from the province capital. According to the 2010 census (INE), the municipality has a population of 917 inhabitants, including the smaller village of Nogarejas.
