= Villardeciervos =

Place in Castile and León, Spain

Coordinates: 41.933°N 6.283°W

Villardeciervos, Spain
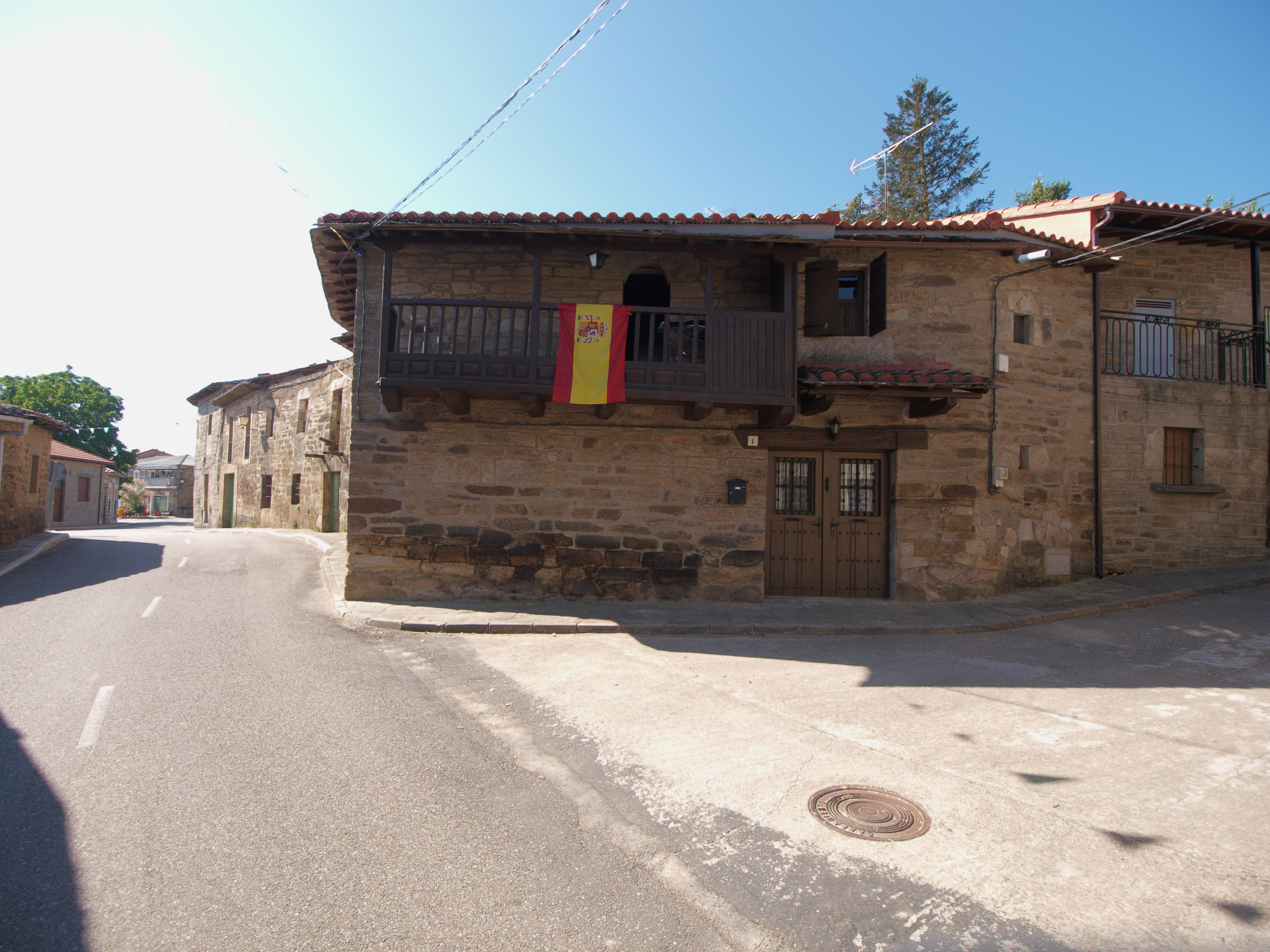

- Flag Coat of arms
- Interactive map of Villardeciervos, Spain
- Country: Spain
- Autonomous community: Castile and León
- Province: Zamora
- Municipality: Villardeciervos

Area
  - Total: 85 km^{2} (33 sq mi)

Population (2025-01-01)
  - Total: 383
  - Density: 4.5/km^{2} (12/sq mi)
- Time zone: UTC+1 (CET)
  - Summer (DST): UTC+2 (CEST)

Villardeciervos is a municipality located in the province of Zamora, Castile and León, Spain. According to the 2004 census (INE), the municipality has a population of 515 inhabitants (cervatos/as).

== See also ==
- La Carballeda
- Sierra de la Culebra
