= San Pedro de Zamudia =

- Location in Spain
- Coordinates: 41°57′0″N 5°52′0″W
- Country: Spain
- Autonomous community: Castile and León
- Province: (Province of Zamora) Zamora
- Comarca: Benavente y Los Valles
- Municipality: Morales de Valverde
- Elevation: 750 m (2,460 ft)

Population (2017)
  - Total: 58 population_density_km2 =
- Demonym: Sampedreño / sampedreña
- Time zone: UTC+1 (CET)
  - Summer (DST): CEST utc_offset_DST = +2
- Postal code: 49520

San Pedro de Zamudia is a Spanish village of the municipality of Morales de Valverde, located in the province of Zamora, in the autonomous community of Castile and León. As of 2017, it had a population of 58.

== Overview ==
It is busiest during the summer months, when people come from other surrounding areas to the town, where they might have grown up or have family from there.

In San Pedro existed a convent for both nuns and monks. The present church is located within a very fertile lot of land where agriculture exists. The outside of the church is one of the more significant points in the espadaña (bell-gable), and the interior, as it could not be another way, has its larger altarpiece and a baptismal.

The result of this, is that the houses are very sunny. The layout is very irregular, without any type of urban planning. When not existing stone quarries, the traditional houses are of marinates.

== Geography ==
San Pedro de Zamudia and the Valverde Valley is located in the northeast of the province of Zamora. It belongs to the Judicial Party of Benavente, which is about 20 km away. It is 67 km far from Zamora and 260 to Madrid.

The village has a small and very plain area. To the south, the Castrón river flows and crosses the Valverde Valley. The lowest part of the area, along the shore of the Castrón, is about 710m and at its highest of about 780m at the mount. The land is sedimentary and basically farmland.

== Demographics ==
The demographic change of San Pedro de Zamudia
Year	1842	1857	1860	1877	1887	1897	1900	1910	1920	1930	1940	1950
Population	ND	233	248	222	256	307	337	304	320	354	373	398
Year	1960	1970	1981	2001	2006	2007	2008	2012	2015	2019	2020	2021
Population	359	265	ND	100	89	88	86	74	61	52	52	TBD

== See also ==
- Sandin
- List of municipalities in Zamora
