= Montesinho Natural Park =

Protected area in Portugal

- IUCN category V (protected landscape/seascape)
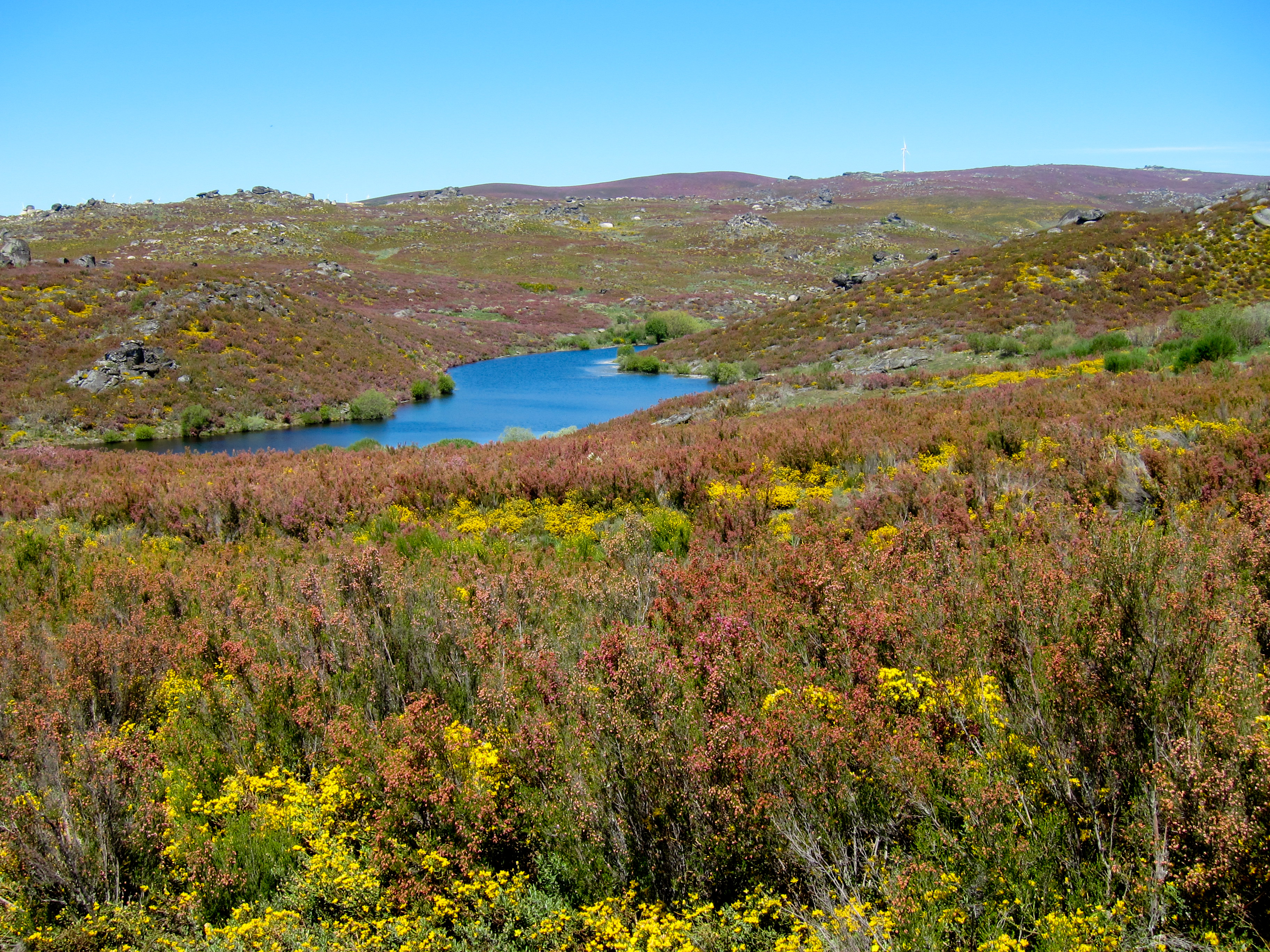

- Location within Portugal
- Location: Bragança District, Portugal
- Coordinates: 41°54′00″N 6°52′9″W
- Area: 742.25 km^{2} (286.58 sq mi)
- Max. elevation: 1,486 m (4,875 ft)
- Created: August 30, 1979
- Administrator: ICNF

The Montesinho Natural Park (Portuguese: Parque Natural de Montesinho) is a protected area located in the municipalities of Vinhais and Bragança, northeastern Portugal. Sections of the southern slopes of the Serra da Coroa (Sierra de la Culebra) fall within the park.

The park contains a wide stretch of land and accommodates around 9,000 people living in 92 villages. Spanning from a minimum elevation of 438 meters to a maximum of 1,486 meters at Montesinho, the park presents varied landscapes and panoramas.

It has a varied avifauna (more than 120 species of breeding birds), including the presence of 70% of terrestrial animal species that occur in Portugal, with emphasis on one of the most important Iberian wolf populations. In 2019 a Cantabrian brown bear was sighted. The ichthyofauna (fish) includes the Northern straight-mouth nase, Luciobarbus bocagei and the brown trout.

Shale dominates the landscape but there are also limestone stains in plateau areas and granite in the Montesinho mountain range. Native trees include Prunus avium, Ulmus minor, Corylus avellana, Malus sylvestris, Quercus pyrenaica, among others. It is the only place in Portugal where Euonymus europaeus can be found naturally.

The government of Portugal maintains a registry and facilitates placement of Cão de Gado Transmontano for flock and wolf protection through its agency, Parque Natural de Montesinho.

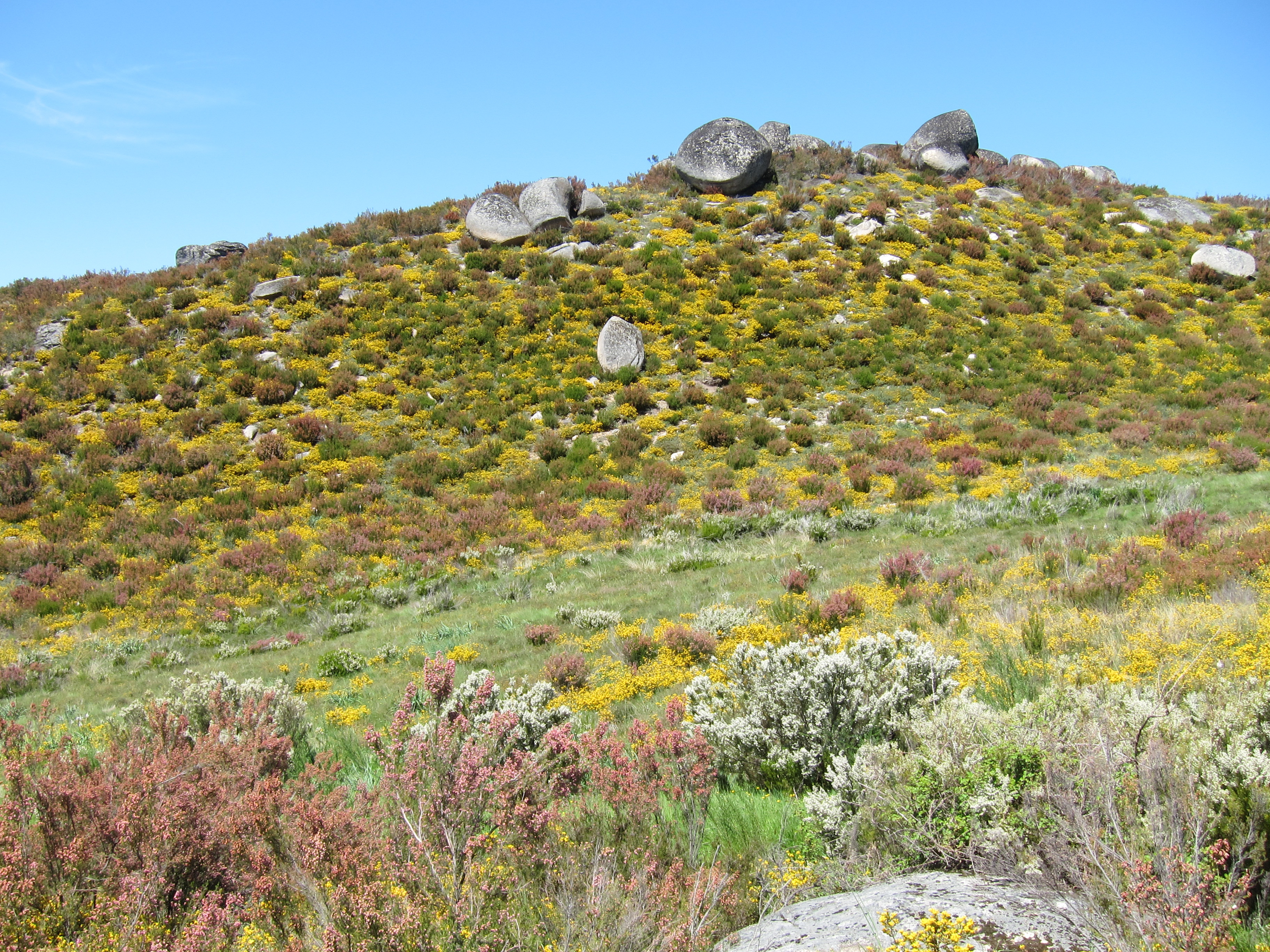

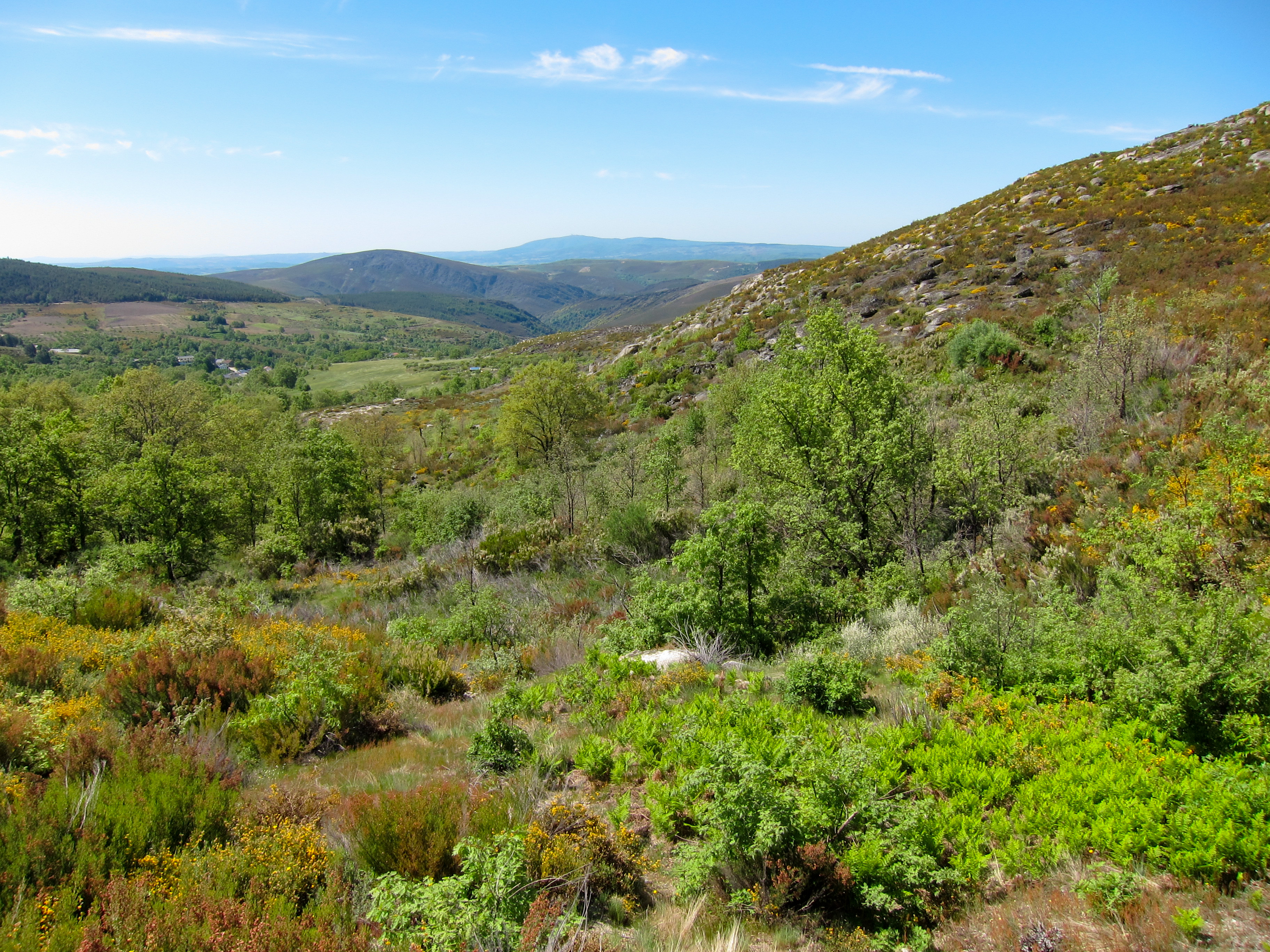

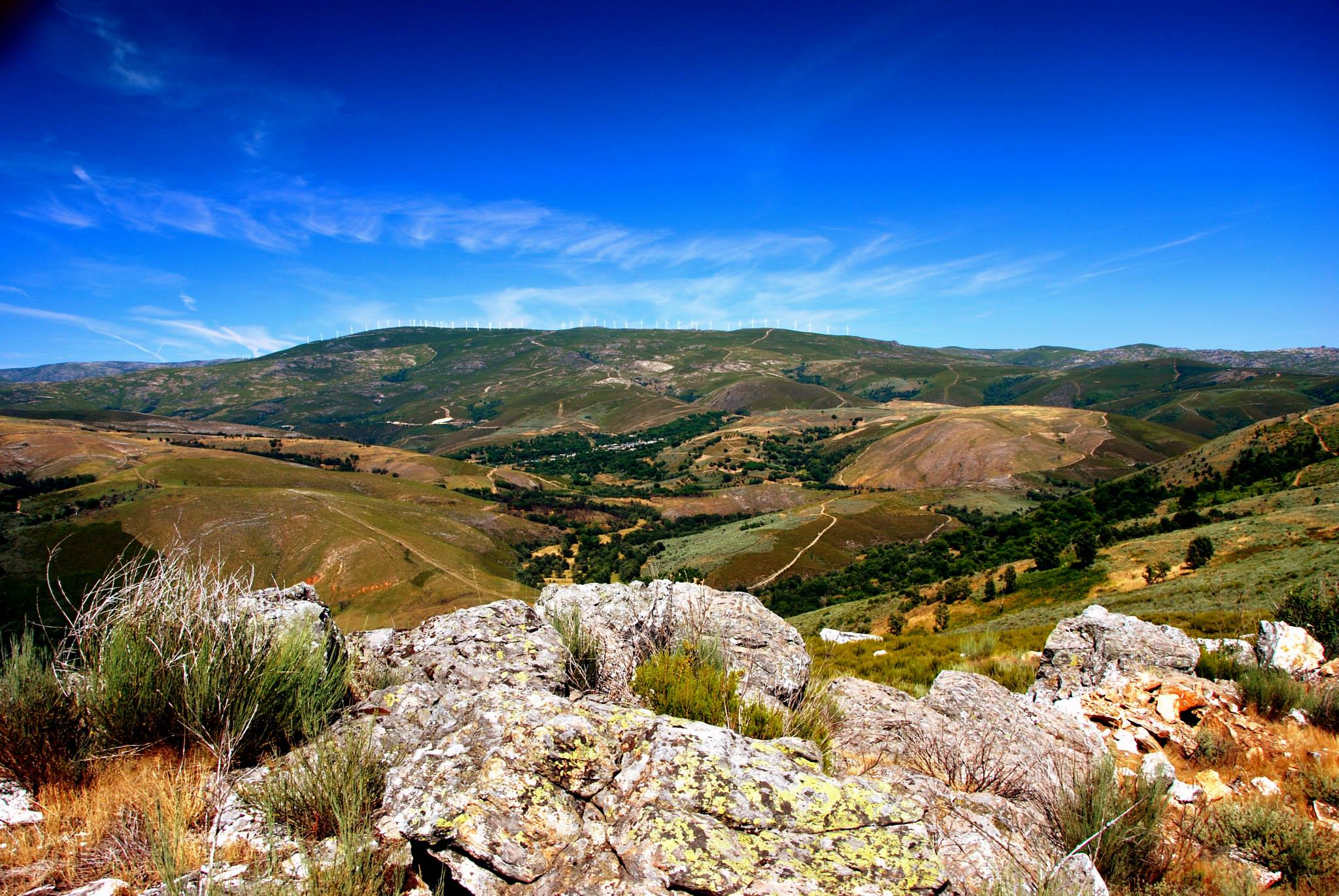

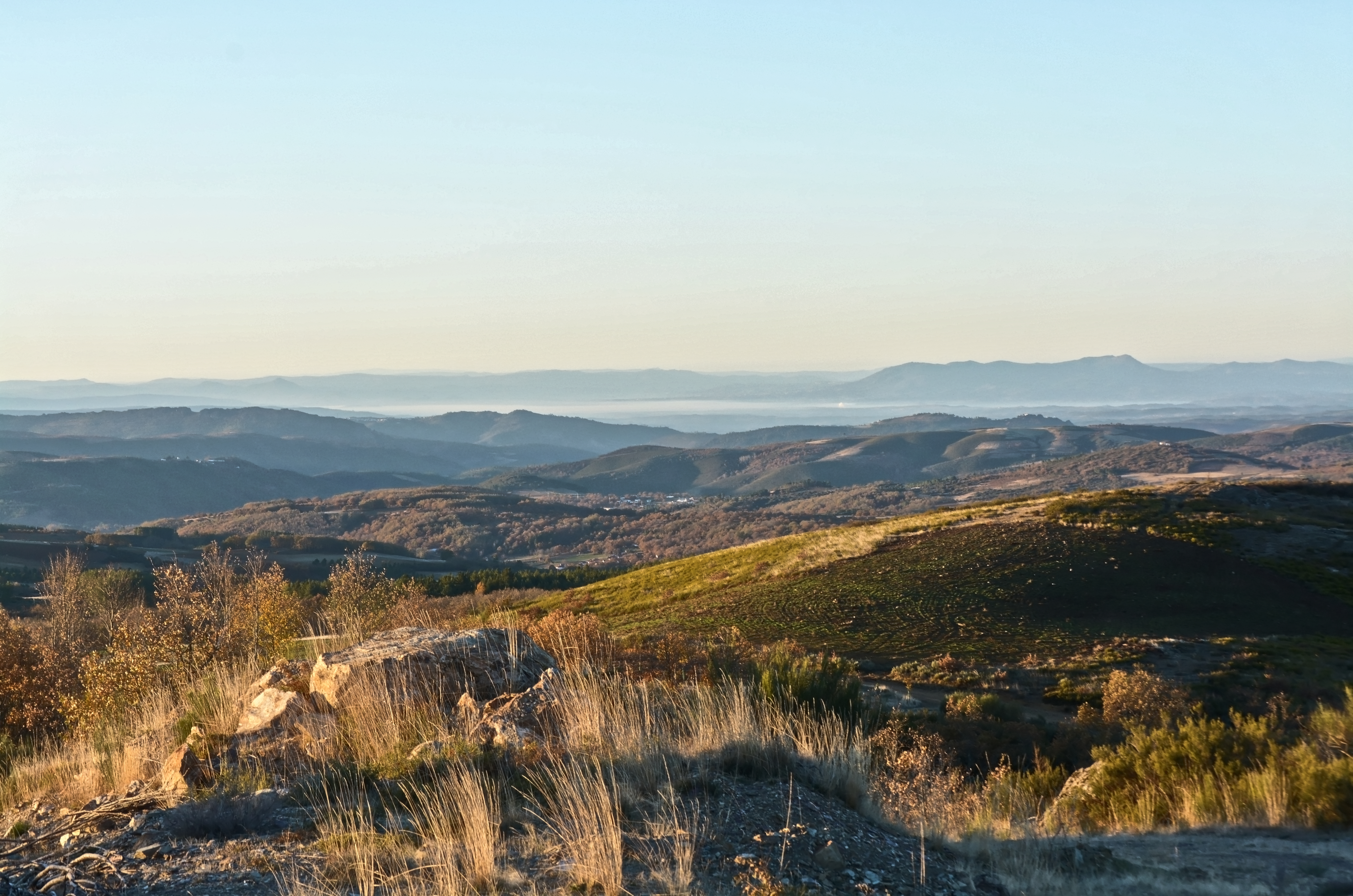

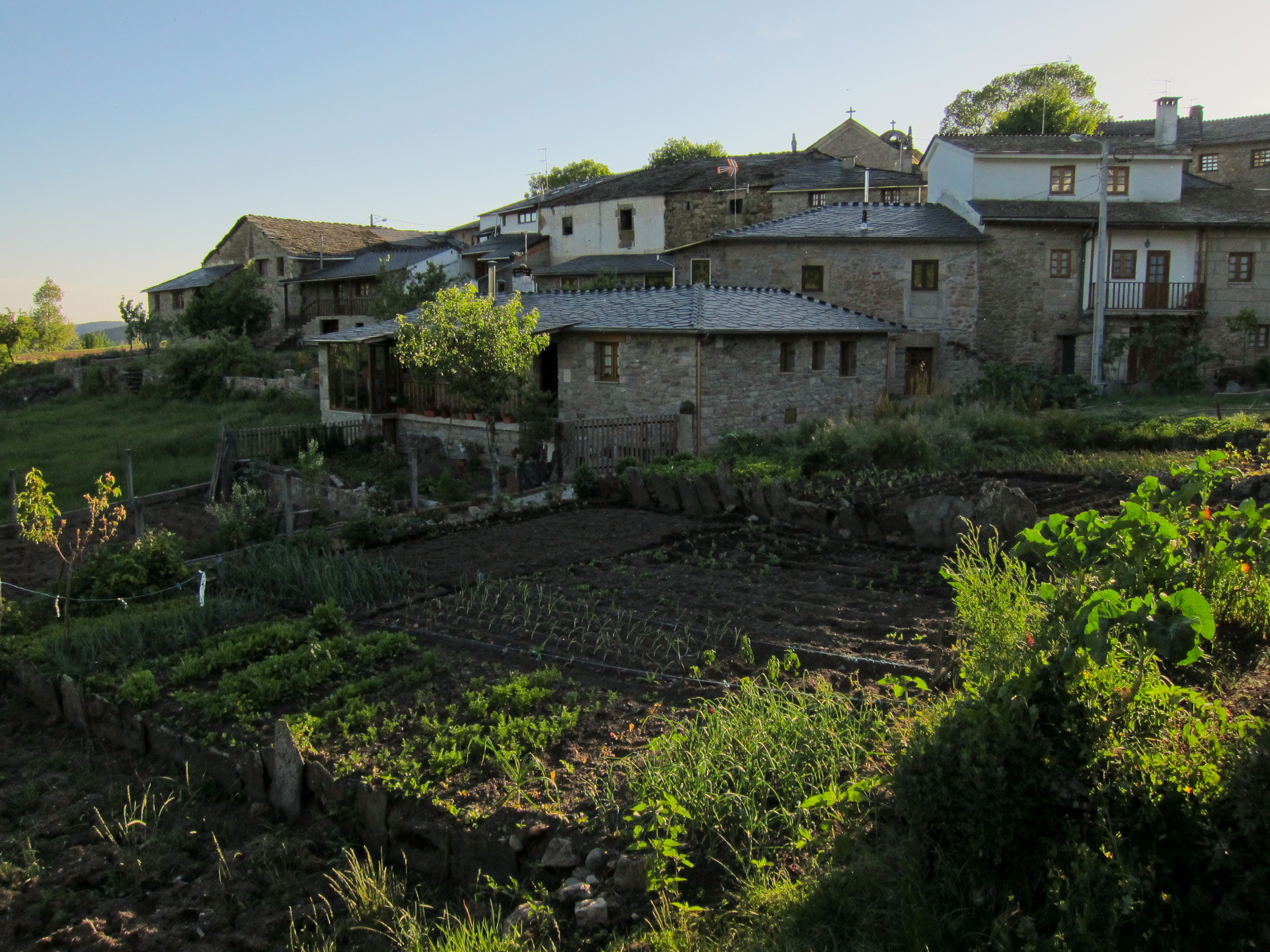

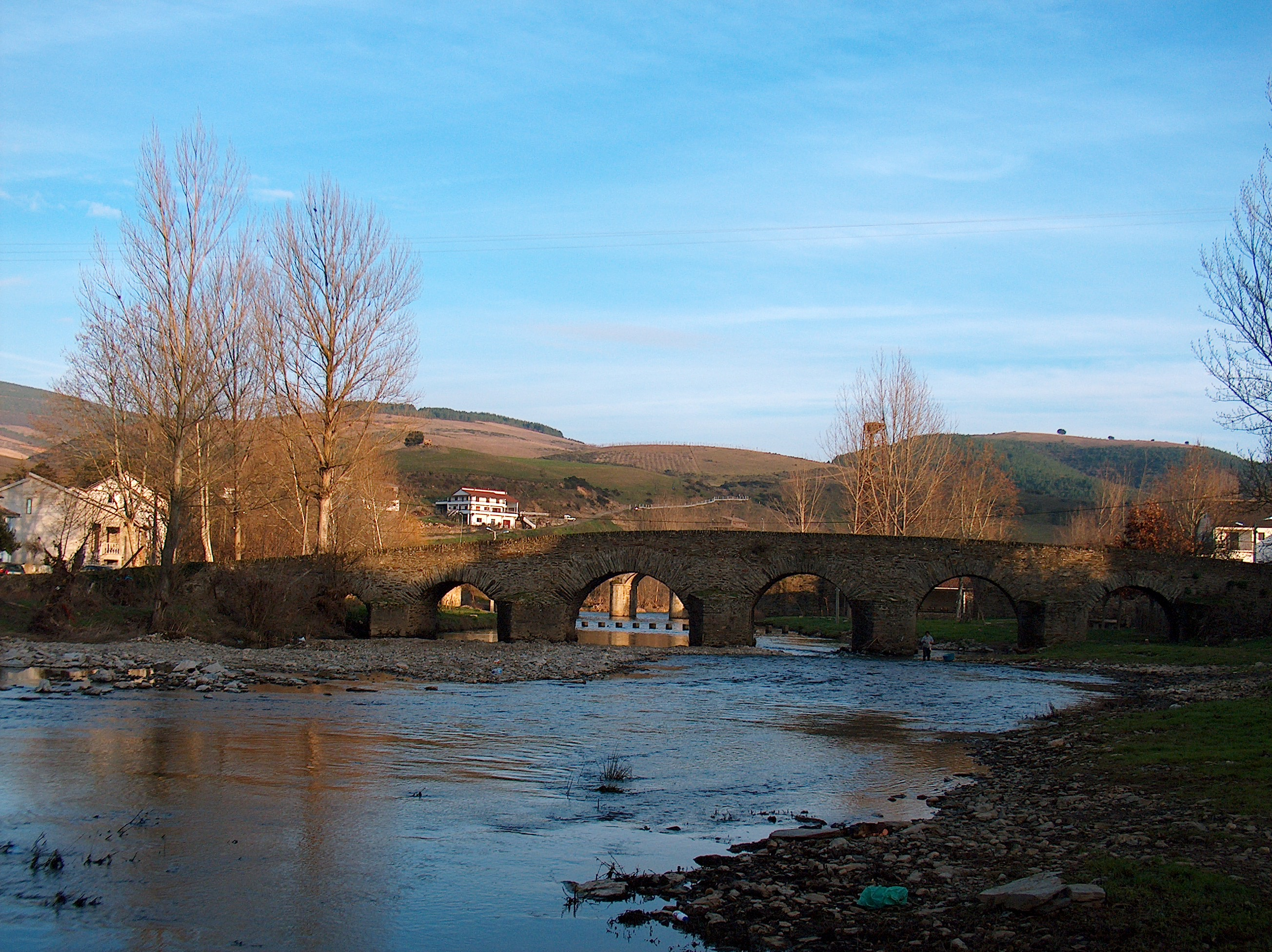

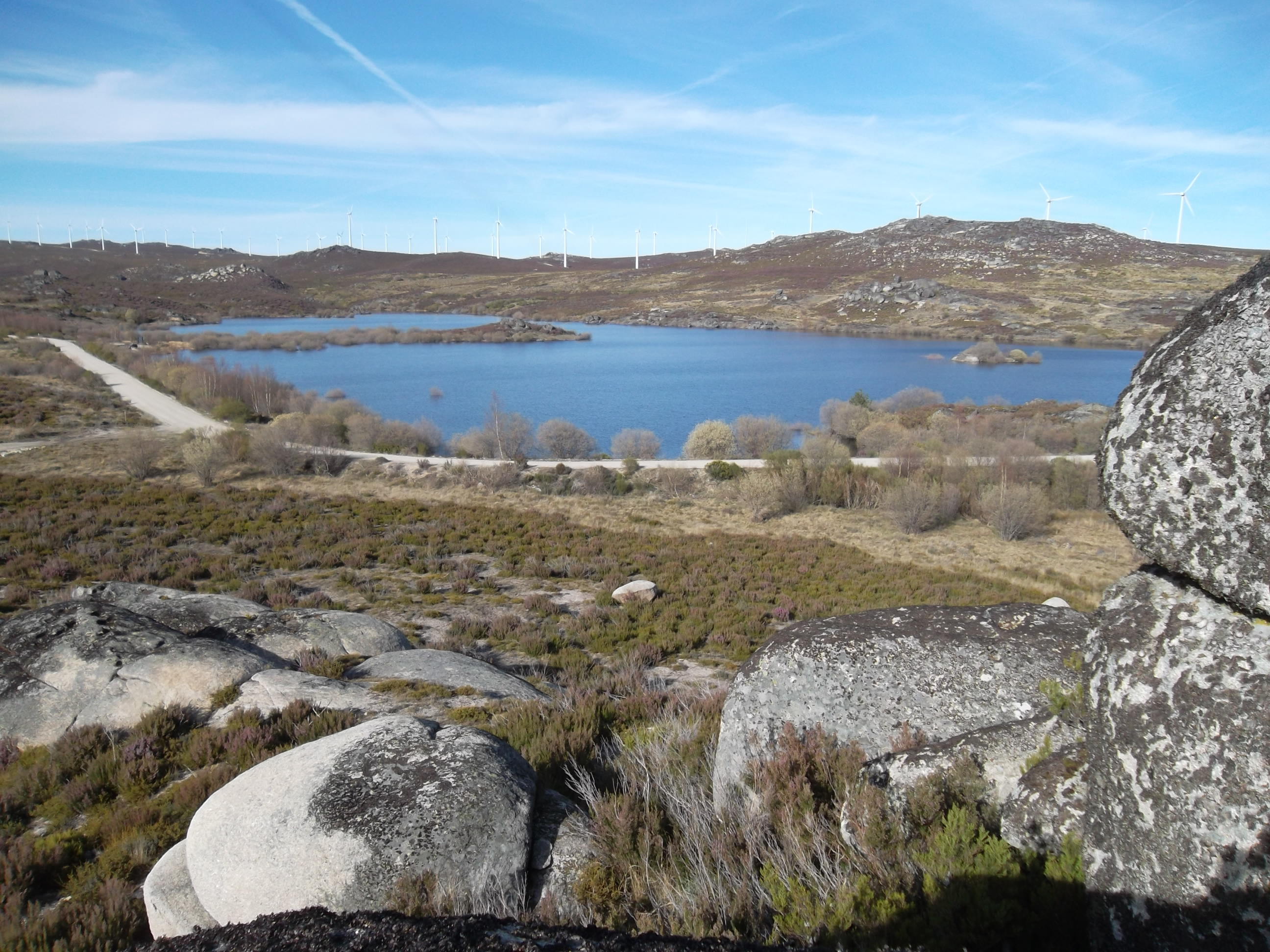
