= Ñuflo de Chaves =

Spanish conquistador

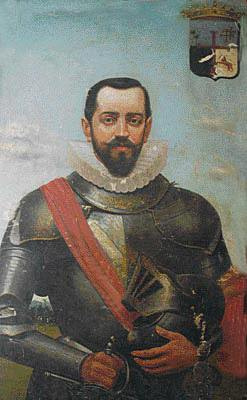
Ñuflo de Chávez

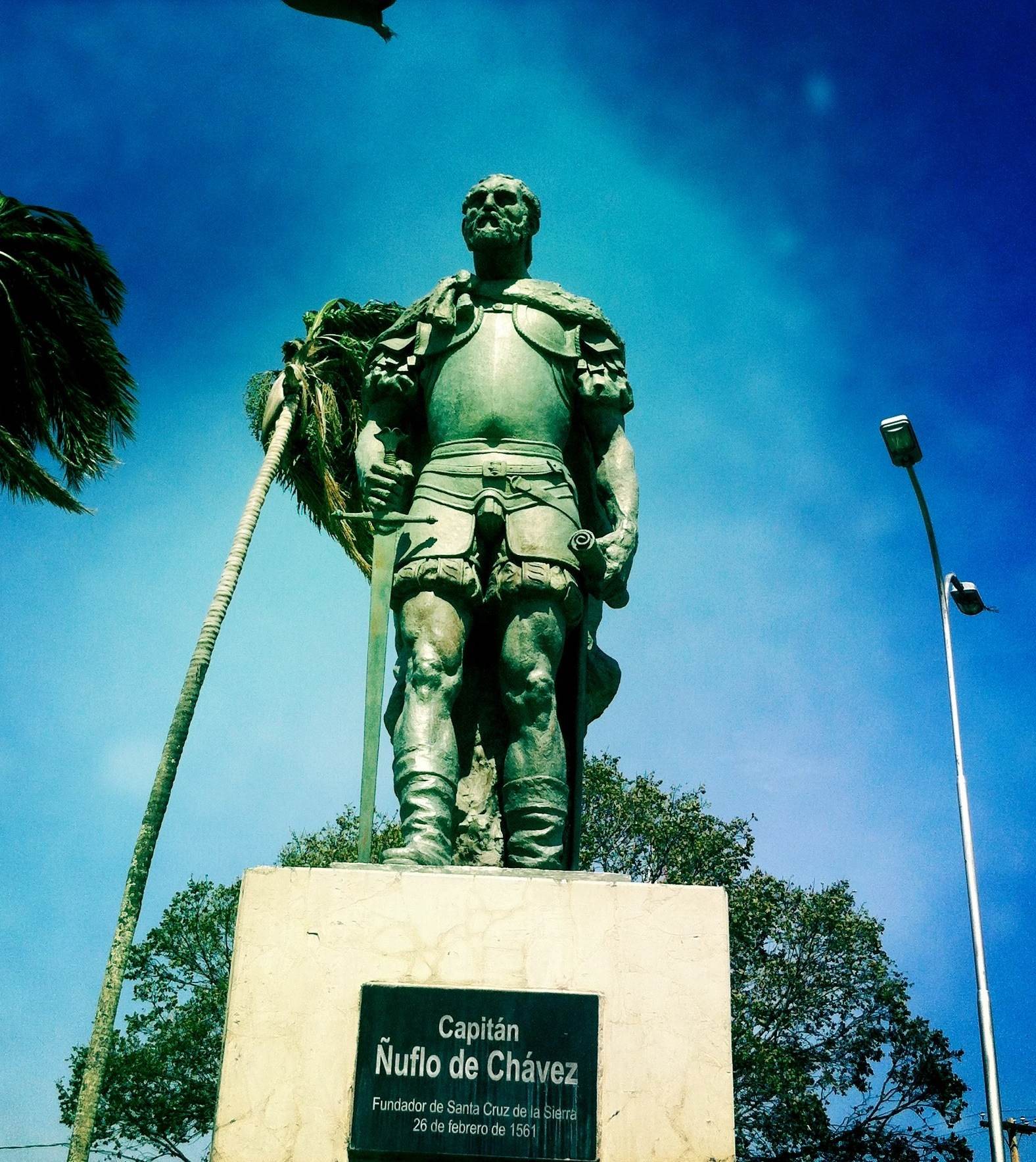
Monument of Ñuflo de Chávez in Santa Cruz, España.

Ñuflo de Chaves or Ñuflo de Chávez (1518–1568) was a Spanish conquistador. He is best known for founding the city of Santa Cruz de la Sierra in (what is today) Bolivia.

== Early life ==
Ñuflo de Chaves was born and grew up in the small Spanish village of Santa Cruz de la Sierra ("Holy Cross of the Mountains"), some 12 km south of Trujillo in the Extremadura region in Spain. He had an elder brother Diego.

== Military ==
Ñuflo de Chaves joined the military and went to South America as a conquistador. In 1544 in Asunción (in today's Paraguay) he participated in the revolt against the Spanish governor Álvar Núñez Cabeza de Vaca. He helped Domingo Martínez de Irala's appointment as governor, and prepared an expedition to Charcas (currently Sucre). In 1557 he planned an expedition to conquer Jarayes lands, and reached today's Brazilian federal state of Mato Grosso, where he thought that he would find gold mines.

In 1561 he moved to the southern Amazon Basin with a group of settlers, where he founded the town of Santa Cruz de la Sierra, giving it the name of his hometown in Spain. Ñuflo de Chaves settled in his new town with his family, being the first European to introduce goats and sheep to the region. He was killed there in a conflict with the Itatines natives in 1568. A few years later the settlement was moved to a new position 220 km further to the west because of the continuing conflicts with the natives.

== Legacy ==
Today the Province of Ñuflo de Chávez in the Bolivian Department of Santa Cruz is named in his honor. He is featured on 1961 Spanish and 1970 Bolivian postal stamps.
