= Morales de Valverde =

Coordinates: 41°56′N 5°53′W

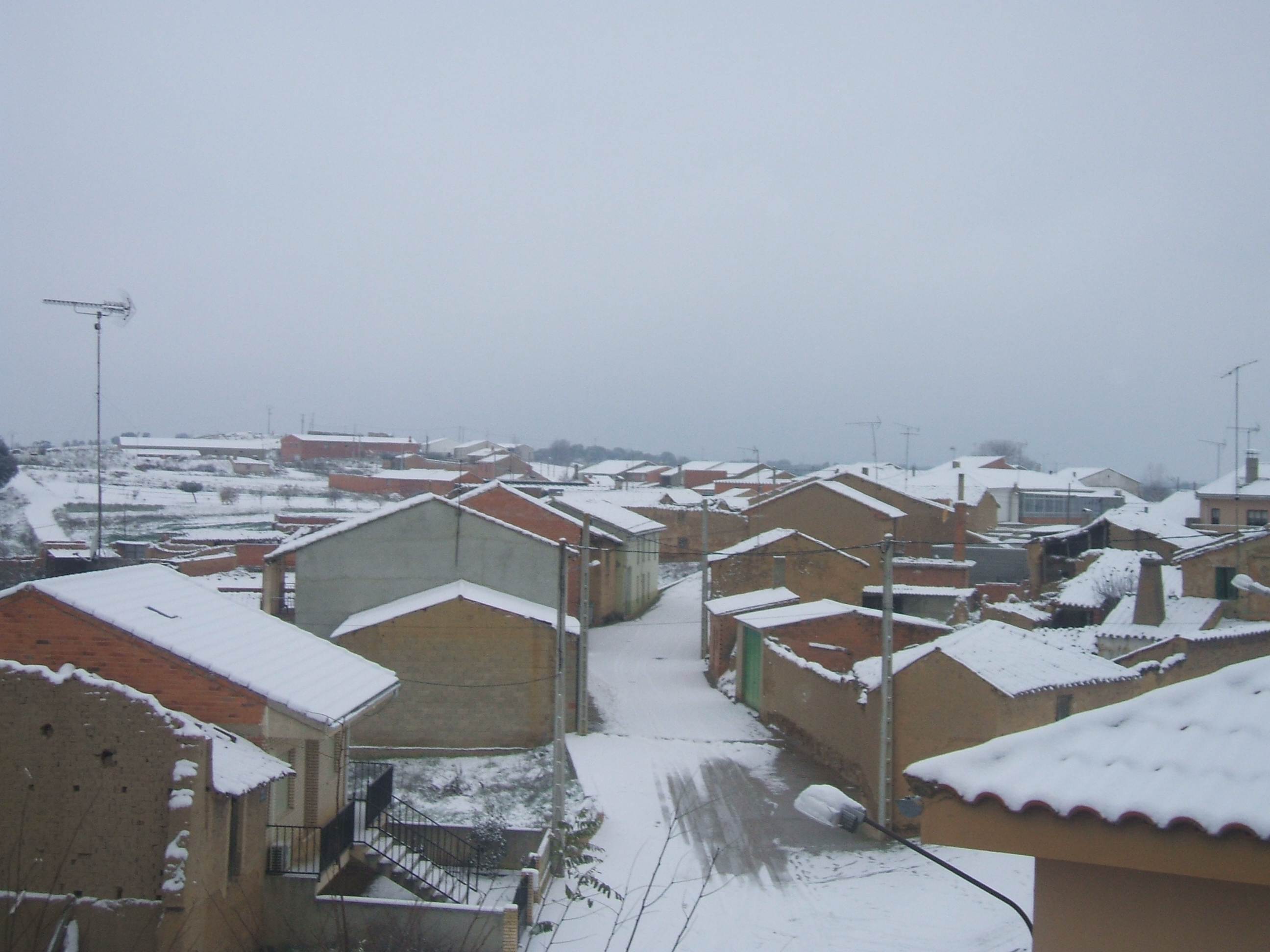
- Morales with snow
- Interactive map of Morales de Valverde
- Country: Spain
- Autonomous community: Castile and León
- Province: Zamora
- Comarca: Benavente y Los Valles

Area
  - Total: 18 km^{2} (6.9 sq mi)

Population (2025-01-01)
  - Total: 156
  - Density: 8.7/km^{2} (22/sq mi)
- Time zone: UTC+1 (CET)
  - Summer (DST): UTC+2 (CEST)
- Website: Official website

Morales de Valverde is a municipality in the province of Zamora, Castile and León, Spain. According to the 2004 census (INE), the municipality has a population of 271 inhabitants.

== See also ==
- San Pedro de Zamudia
- List of municipalities in Zamora
