= Peque, Zamora =

Peque
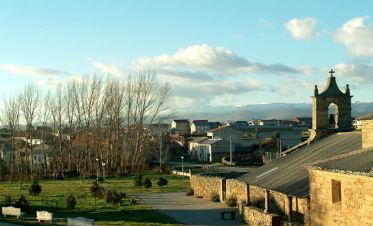
- An overview of the village of Peque.

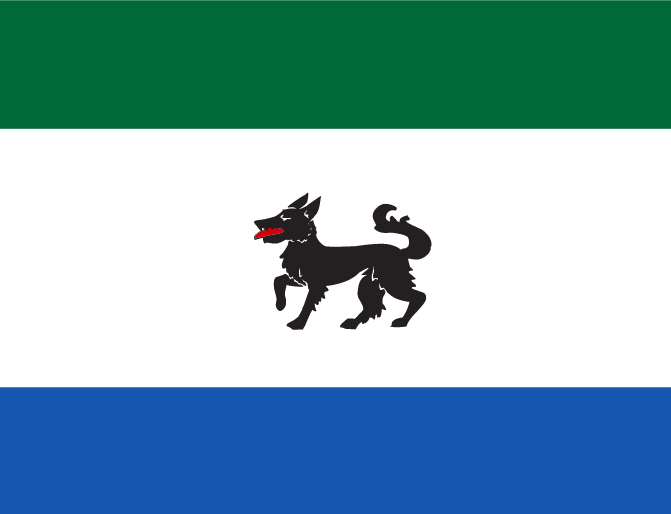
- Flag Coat of arms

- Location in Spain. Peque (Castile and León)
- Coordinates: 41°13′53″N 5°29′35″W
- Country: Spain
- Autonomous community: Castile and León
- Province: Zamora
- Judicial district: Puebla de Sanabria
- Municipality: Peque

Government
  - Mayor: Teresa María Garrao Alonso (People's Party)

Area
  - Total: 38.88 km^{2} (15.01 sq mi)
- Elevation: 855 m (2,805 ft)

Population (2023)
  - Total: 124
  - Density: 3.19/km^{2} (8.26/sq mi)
- Time zone: UTC+1 (CET)
  - Summer (DST): UTC+2 (CEST)

Peque is a village and municipality in the province of Zamora, part of the autonomous community of Castile and León, Spain. It has a population of approximately 124 inhabitants as of the 2023 Continuous Register.

== See also ==
- La Carballeda
- Kingdom of León
- Leonese language
