= Manzana =

Manzana, a Spanish word meaning "apple", may refer to:

- Manzana (album), a 2004 album by Los Prisioneros
- Manzana (unit), a city block
- Manzana, San Jose, a barangay of San Jose, Camarines Sur, Philippines
- Manzana verde, an alcoholic beverage

== See also ==
- Las Manzanas River, Guatemala
- Manzanal (disambiguation)
