= Figueruela de Arriba =

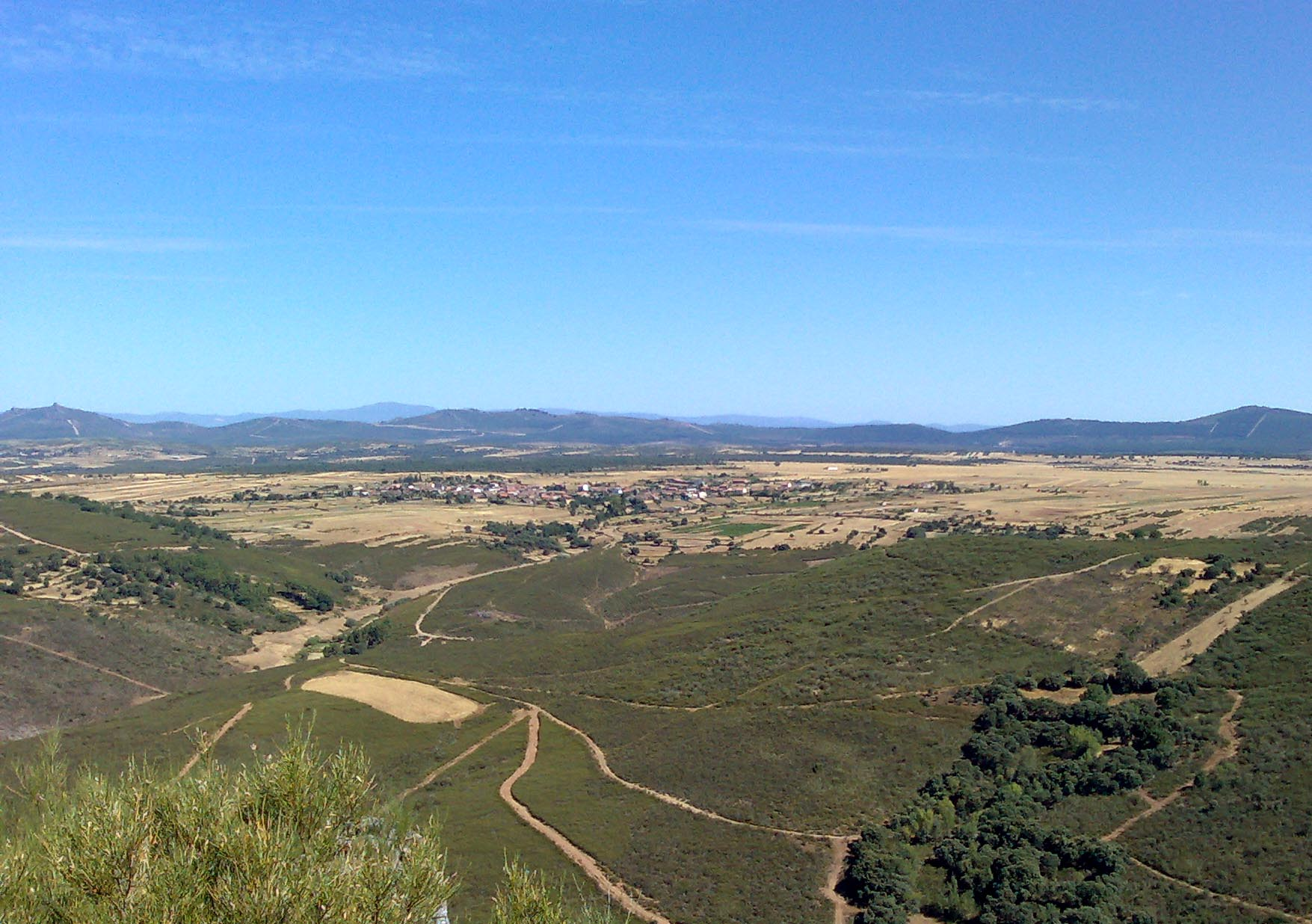

- Location in Spain.
- Coordinates: 41°52′07″N 6°26′35″W
- Country: Spain
- Autonomous community: Castile and León
- Province: Zamora
- Comarca: Aliste

Government
  - Mayor: Carlos Pérez Domínguez

Area
  - Total: 153 km^{2} (59 sq mi)

Population (2025-01-01)
  - Total: 310
  - Density: 2.0/km^{2} (5.2/sq mi)
- Time zone: UTC+1 (CET)
  - Summer (DST): UTC+2 (CEST)

Figueruela de Arriba is a municipality located in the province of Zamora, Castile and León, Spain. According to the 2009 census (INE), the municipality has a population of 423 inhabitants.

Peña Mira, the highest point of the Sierra de la Culebra range, is located in the area of Flechas, within Figueruela de Arriba municipal term.

This municipality is located close to the border with Portugal.

== Town hall ==
Figueruela de Arriba is home to the town hall of 7 villages:

- Figueruela de Arriba (98 inhabitants, INE 2020).
- Gallegos del Campo (86 inhabitants, INE 2020).
- Figueruela de Abajo (61 inhabitants, INE 2020).
- Moldones (37 inhabitants, INE 2020).
- Riomanzanas (26 inhabitants, INE 2020).
- Villarino de Manzanas (15 inhabitants, INE 2020).
- Flechas (13 inhabitants, INE 2020).
