= Espadañedo =

Coordinates: 42°08′N 6°22′W

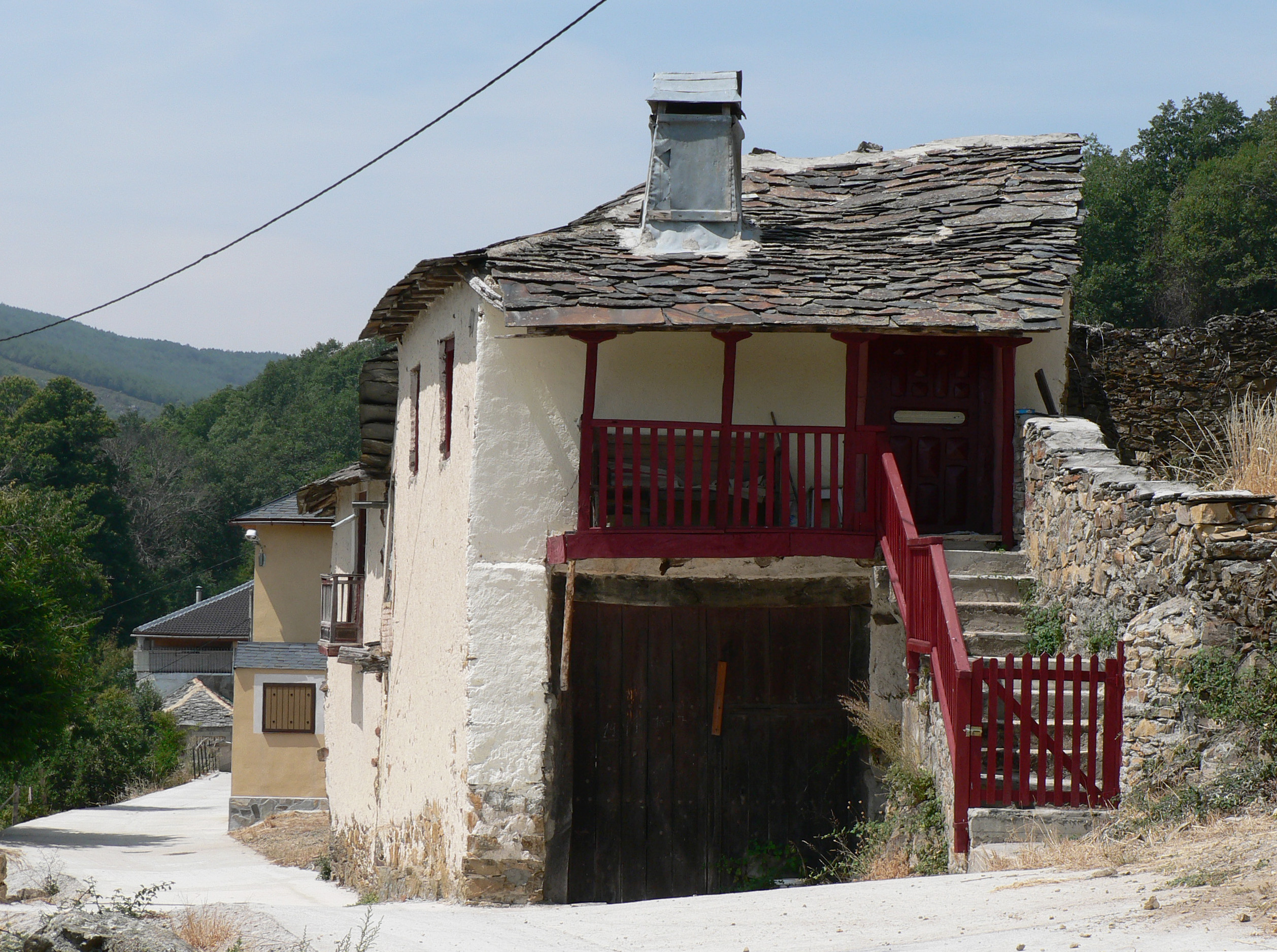
- Interactive map of Espadañedo
- Country: Spain
- Autonomous community: Castile and León
- Province: Zamora
- Municipality: Espadañedo

Area
  - Total: 77 km^{2} (30 sq mi)

Population (2025-01-01)
  - Total: 109
  - Density: 1.4/km^{2} (3.7/sq mi)
- Time zone: UTC+1 (CET)
  - Summer (DST): UTC+2 (CEST)

Espadañedo is a municipality located in the province of Zamora, Castile and León, Spain. According to the 2009 census (INE), the municipality has a population of 158 inhabitants.
