= Christophe Justel =

French scholar

Christophe Justel (1580–1649) was a French scholar, known as Christophorus or Christopher Justellus.

A librarian, canonist and Protestant, he served as secretary to the French king Henri IV, buying the office for his son Henri Justel (1620–1693).

== Works ==
- Nomocanon Photii Patriarchae Constantinopolitani cum commentariis Theodori Balsamonis Patriarchae Antiocheni (1614, 1625)
- Codex canonum ecclesiae universae. A Justiniano Imperatore confirmatus (1610–18) later in the 1661 edition by Guillaume Voël (as "G. Voellus") (with Henri Justel) known as Bibliotheca juris canonici veteris
- Histoire de la maison de Turenne (1645)
