= Rionegro del Puente =

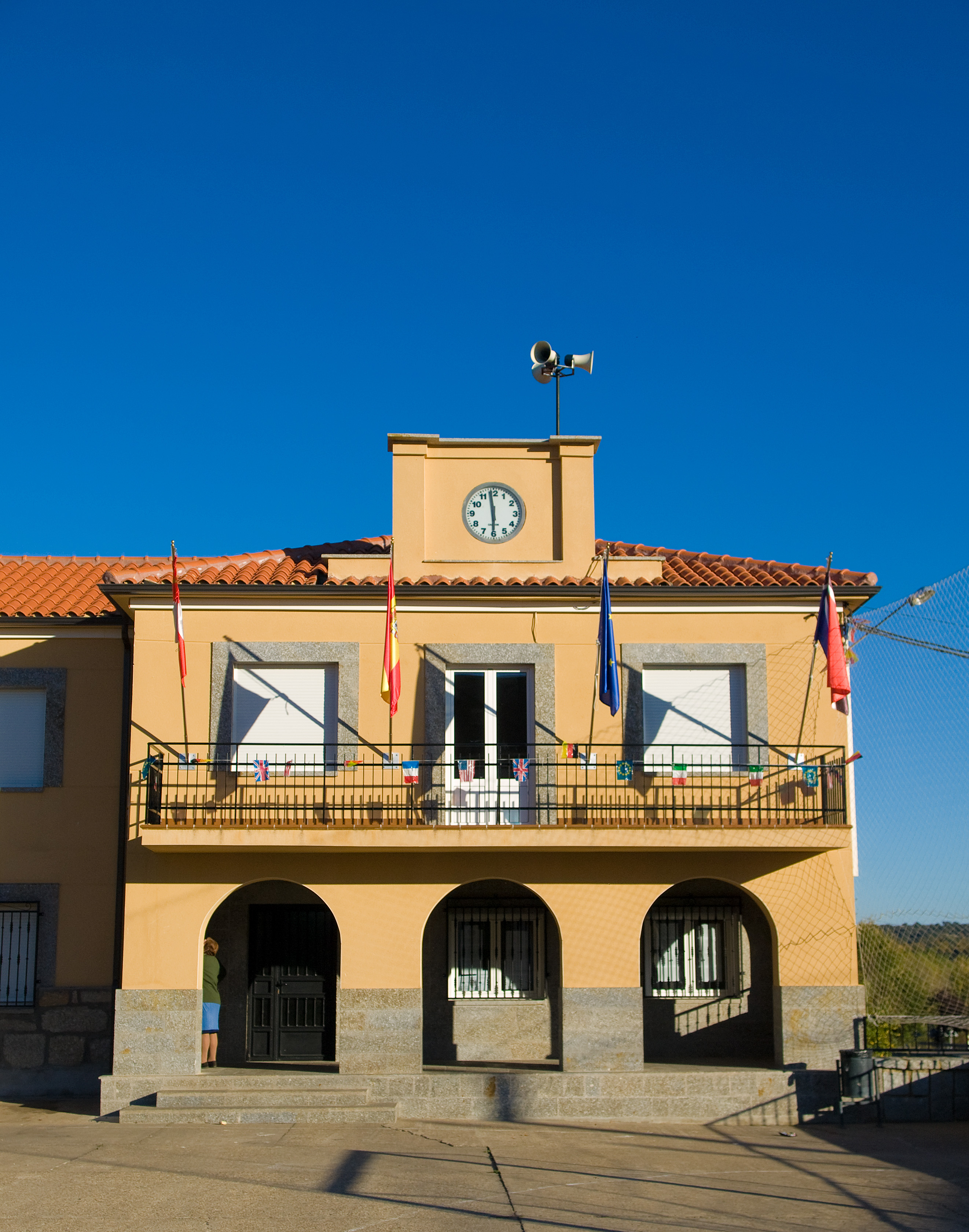

- Flag Coat of arms

- Location in Spain.
- Coordinates: 42°0′24″N 6°13′35″W
- Country: Spain
- Autonomous community: Castile and León
- Province: Zamora
- Comarca: La Carballeda

Government
  - Mayor: José Antonio Colino de la Cuesta

Area
  - Total: 53 km^{2} (20 sq mi)
- Elevation: 800 m (2,600 ft)

Population (2025-01-01)
  - Total: 224
  - Density: 4.2/km^{2} (11/sq mi)
- Time zone: UTC+1 (CET)
  - Summer (DST): UTC+2 (CEST)

Rionegro del Puente is a municipality located in the province of Zamora, Castile and León, Spain. As of 2009, it had a population of 318 inhabitants.
