= Muelas de los Caballeros =

Place in Castile and León, Spain

Coordinates: 42°08′N 6°20′W

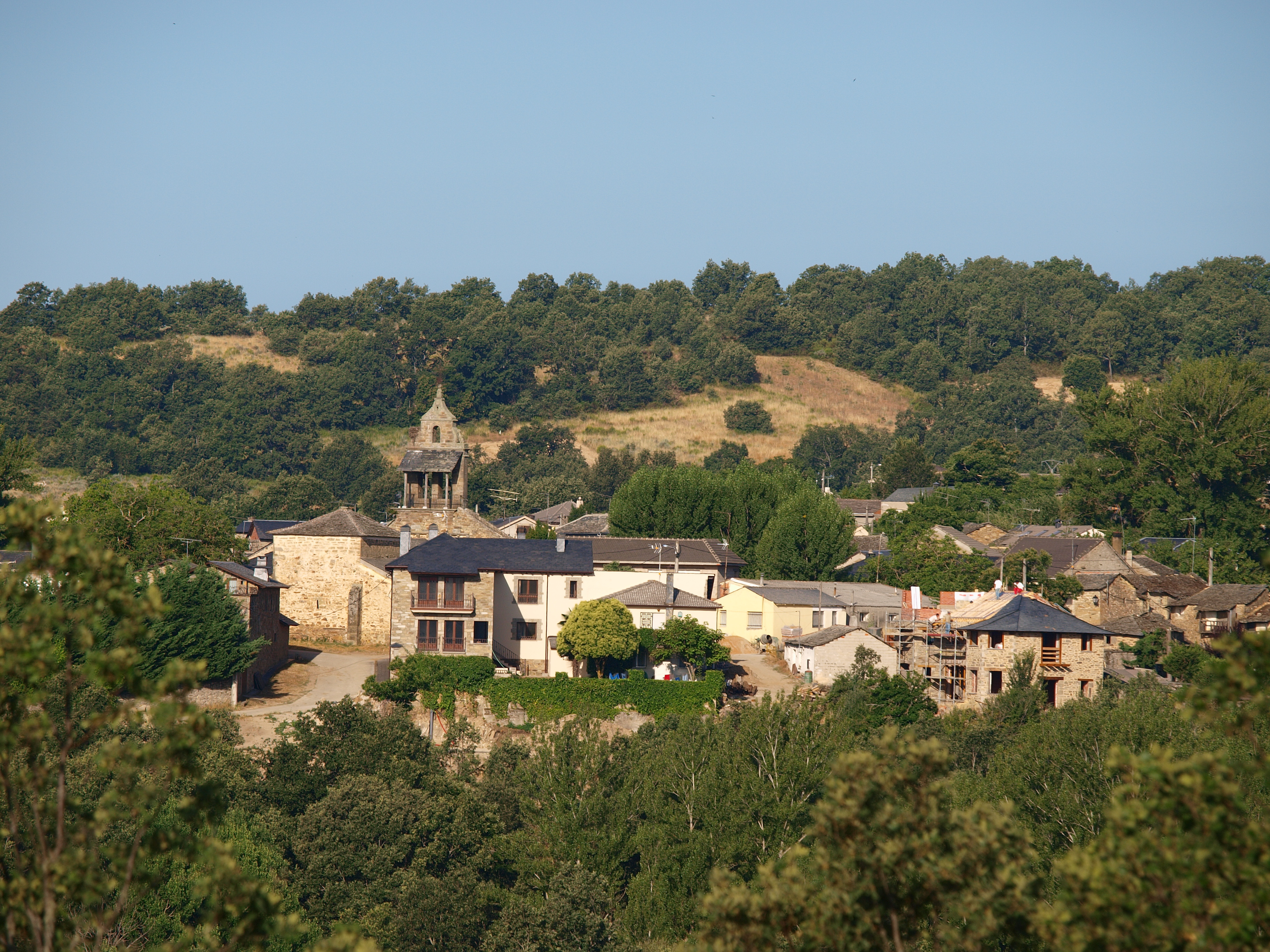

- Flag Coat of arms
- Interactive map of Muelas de los Caballeros
- Country: Spain
- Autonomous community: Castile and León
- Province: Zamora
- Municipality: Muelas de los Caballeros

Area
  - Total: 71.58 km^{2} (27.64 sq mi)
- Elevation: 985 m (3,232 ft)

Population (2025-01-01)
  - Total: 184
  - Density: 2.57/km^{2} (6.66/sq mi)
- Time zone: UTC+1 (CET)
  - Summer (DST): UTC+2 (CEST)

Muelas de los Caballeros is a municipality located in the province of Zamora, Castile and León, Spain. According to the 2004 census (INE), the municipality had a population of 246 inhabitants.
