= Otero de Bodas =

Place in Castile and León, Spain

Coordinates: 41°57′N 6°09′W

Otero de Bodas, Spain
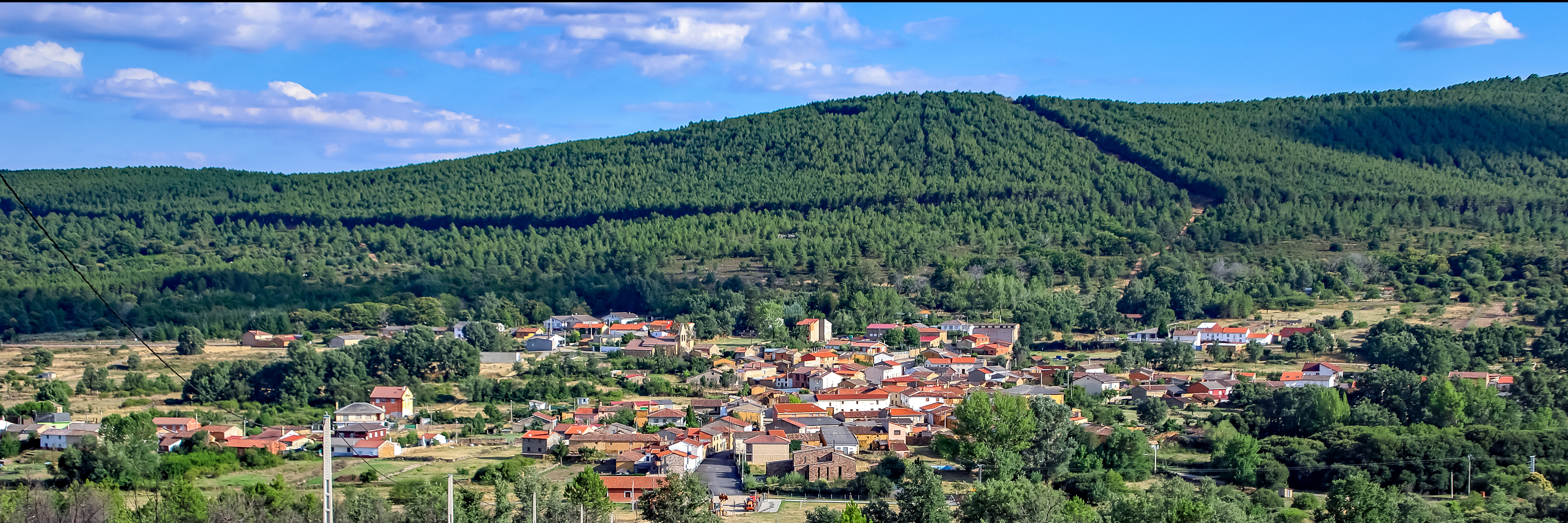
- Interactive map of Otero de Bodas, Spain
- Country: Spain
- Autonomous community: Castile and León
- Province: Zamora
- Municipality: Otero de Bodas

Government

Area
  - Total: 49.9 km^{2} (19.3 sq mi)
- Elevation: 836 m (2,743 ft)

Population (2025-01-01)
  - Total: 164
  - Density: 3.29/km^{2} (8.51/sq mi)
- Time zone: UTC+1 (CET)
  - Summer (DST): UTC+2 (CEST)

Otero de Bodas is a municipality located in the province of Zamora, Castile and León, Spain. According to the 2004 census (INE), the municipality had a population of 229 inhabitants.
