= Sierra de la Culebra =

Portuguese-Spanish mountain range

- Serra da Coroa
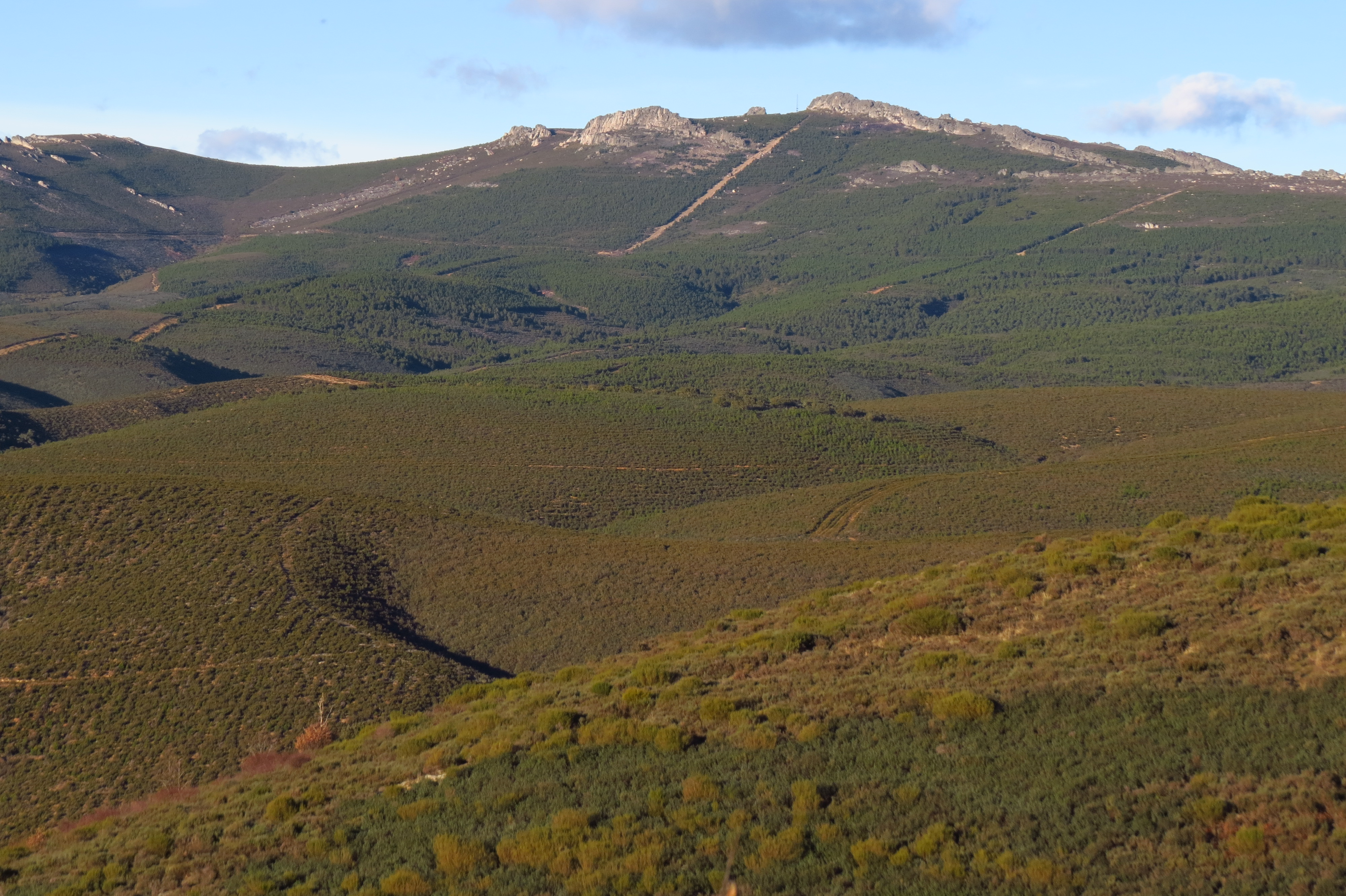
- Sierra de la Culebra from afar

Highest point
- Peak: Peña Mira
- Elevation: 1,243 m (4,078 ft)
- Coordinates: 41°53′54″N 6°20′01″W

Dimensions
- Length: 95 km (59 mi) ENE/WSW
- Width: 32 km (20 mi) NNW/SSE

Geography
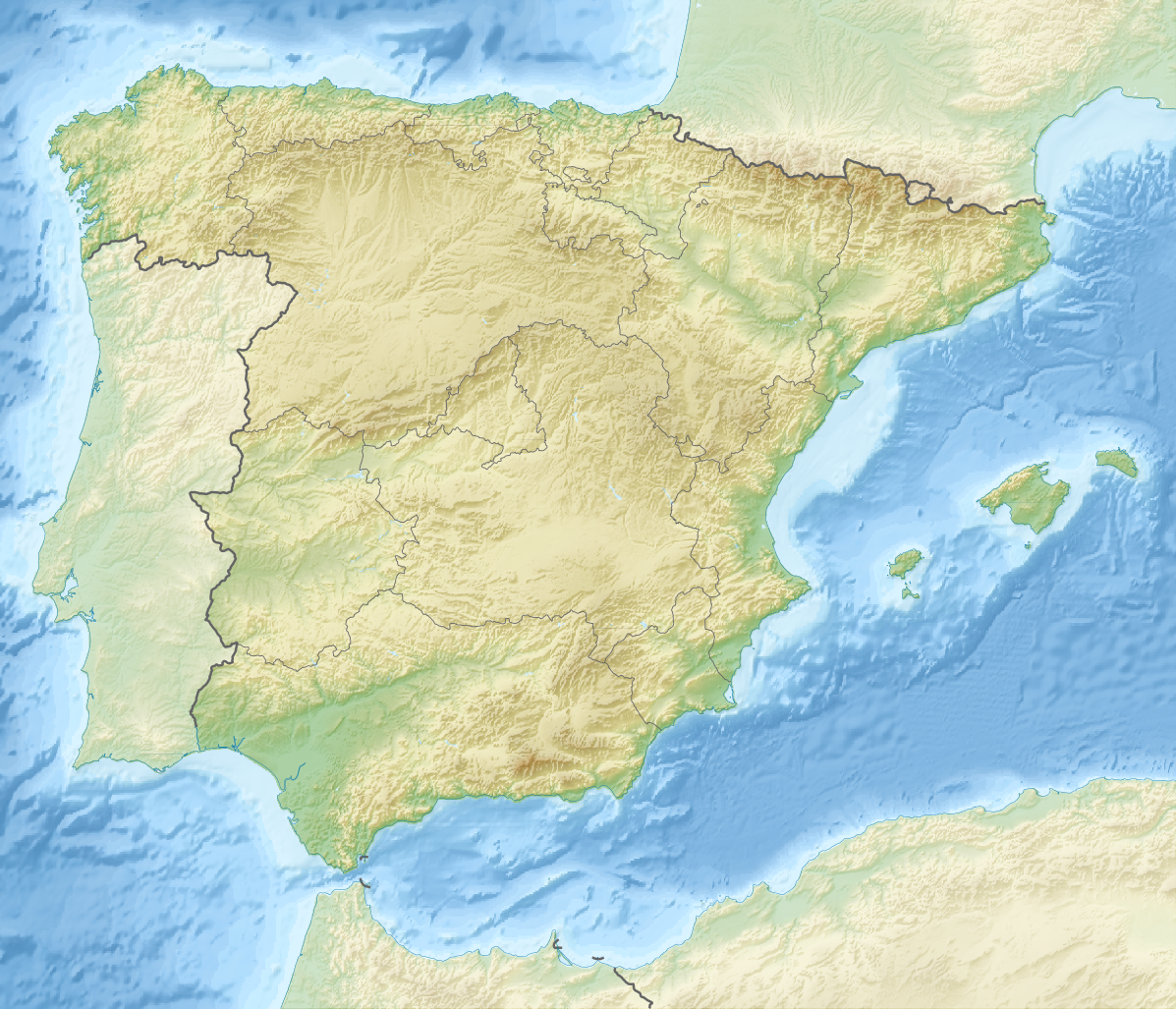
- Location within Iberia
- Location: Vinhais and Bragança municipalities District of Bragança; Zamora Province, Castile and León
- Countries: Portugal and Spain
- Parent range: Montes de León

Geology
- Orogeny: Variscan orogeny
- Rock age: Ordovician
- Rock type: Slates

The Sierra de la Culebra, or Serra da Coroa (in Portuguese), is a mountain range in Castile and León, northwest Spain, and northeastern Portugal. It lies 7 km south of Puebla de Sanabria in the comarcas of Aliste, Sanabria and La Carballeda (Zamora Province), as well as Vinhais and Bragança municipalities in the District of Bragança. Its highest point is 1,243 metres (4,078 ft) high Peña Mira, located near Flechas, within Figueruela de Arriba municipal term; other important peaks are Miño Cuevo 1,211 metres (3,973 ft) and La Pedrizona 1,054 metres (3,458 ft).

The Sierra de la Culebra is a 95 km long regular mountain chain of medium height, forming a natural border with the Portuguese region of Tras os Montes on its western end. Its slopes are wooded, occasionally ravaged by forest fires. The summits of the range are often covered with snow in the winter and there are odd-looking rocky quartzite outcrops on them.

Among the rivers in Spain and Portugal having their source in Sierra de la Culebra, the Castro River, Tera, Tuella, Sabor and Maçãs (Manzanas), deserve mention.

These mountains are famous as one of the few remaining strongholds of the Iberian wolf.

== Subranges ==
The Sierra de la Culebra is a southeastern prolongation of Sierra Segundera, at the southern fringes of the Macizo Galaico-Leonés. The western prolongations of Serra de Montezinho or Maciço de Montesinho, Sierra de la Gamoneda (Portuguese: Serra da Gamoneda) and Sierra del Marabón (Portuguese: Serra de Marabón) are part of the Sierra de la Culebra mountainous system. Other subranges are Sierra de las Cavernas, Sierra de los Cantadores and Sierra de las Carbas, located on the Spanish side.

One important feature is the Rock of the Three Kingdoms dividing three ancient Iberian kingdoms in the Serra de Marabón subrange.

== Natural reserves ==
On the Portuguese side the area of the Sierra de la Culebra range is included in the Montesinho Natural Park.

The Reserva de Caza de la Sierra de la Culebra, is a national hunting forest reserve on the Spanish side. Controversially, the wolves are protected in the reserve in order that they may be shot by sportsmen on payment of a fee of several thousand Euros. This process is defended on the grounds that it helps pay for the upkeep of the reserve and thus the protection of the species as a whole. The number of wolves authorised for hunting each year in Spain is strictly controlled, the auction being carried out in Villardeciervos, but many more are shot illegally.

In the Sierra de la Culebra reserve, wolves may occasionally be observed when attracted to a bait-station, known locally as a Muladar, where remains of dead horses and donkeys are put out for them.

On the Sierra de la Culebra reserve there is a healthy population of the wolves' main prey species - roe deer, red deer and wild boar. The presence of the carcasses put out for the wolves also attracts spectacular raptors such as the griffon vulture.

There are also small colonies of Vipera latastei and Coronella austriaca, which perhaps gave the mountains their name.

== Gallery ==
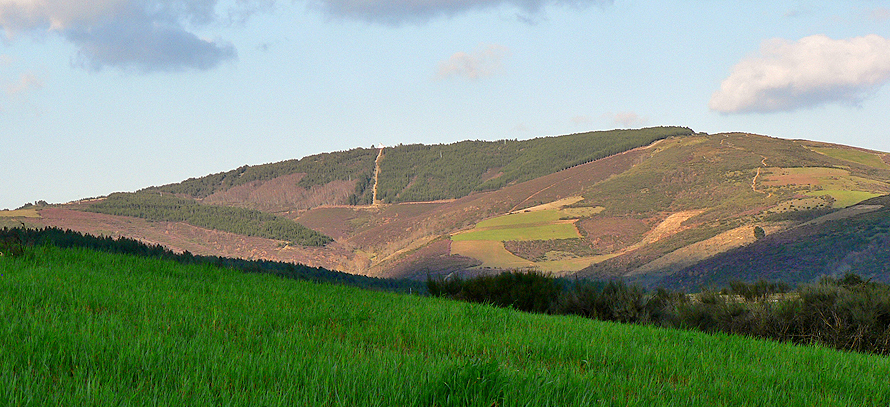
Sierra de la Culebra seen from Tuizelo, on the Portuguese side

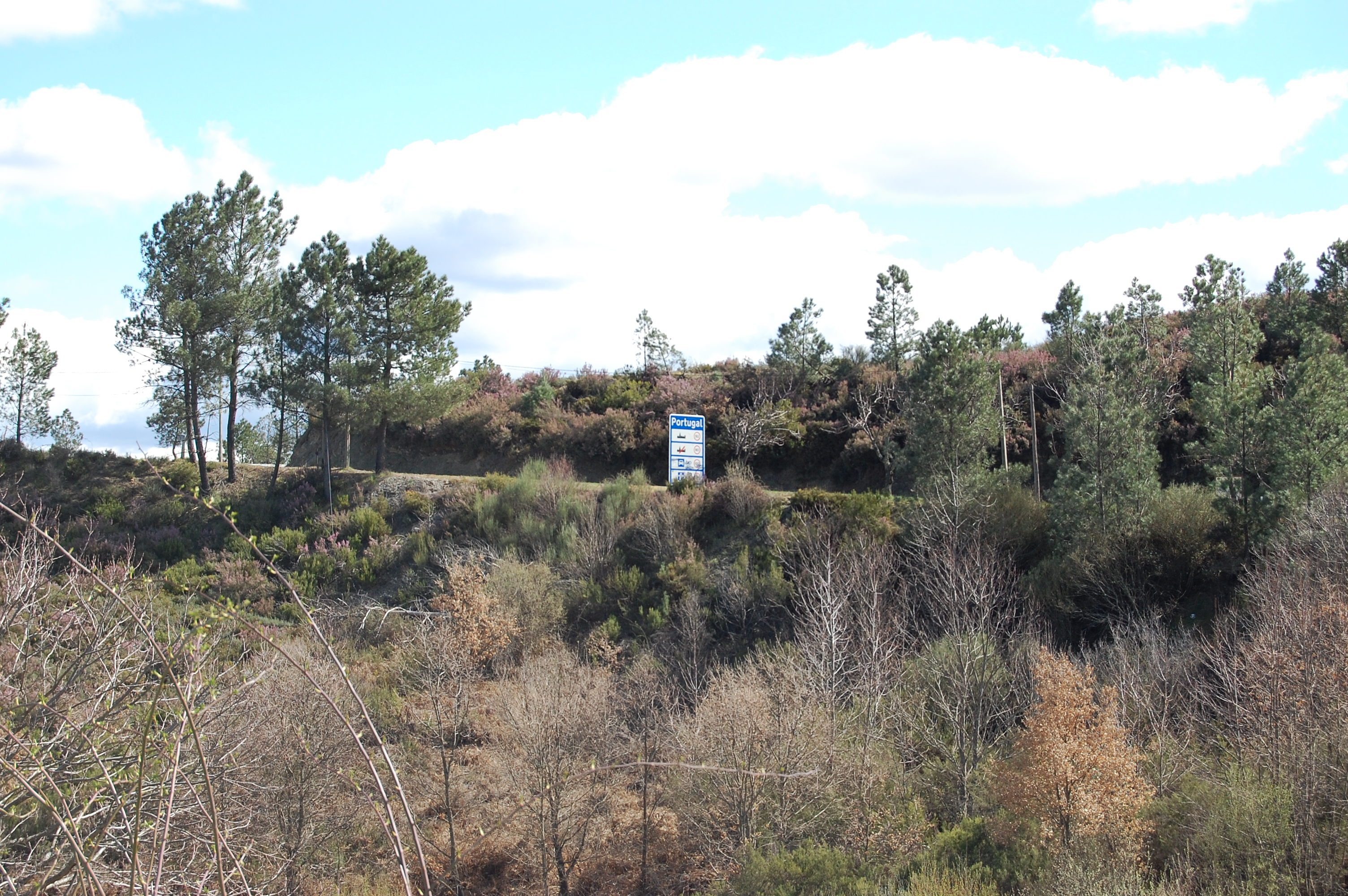
The border between Spain and Portugal on the road that crosses the western fringe of Sierra de la Culebra in Vinhais municipality

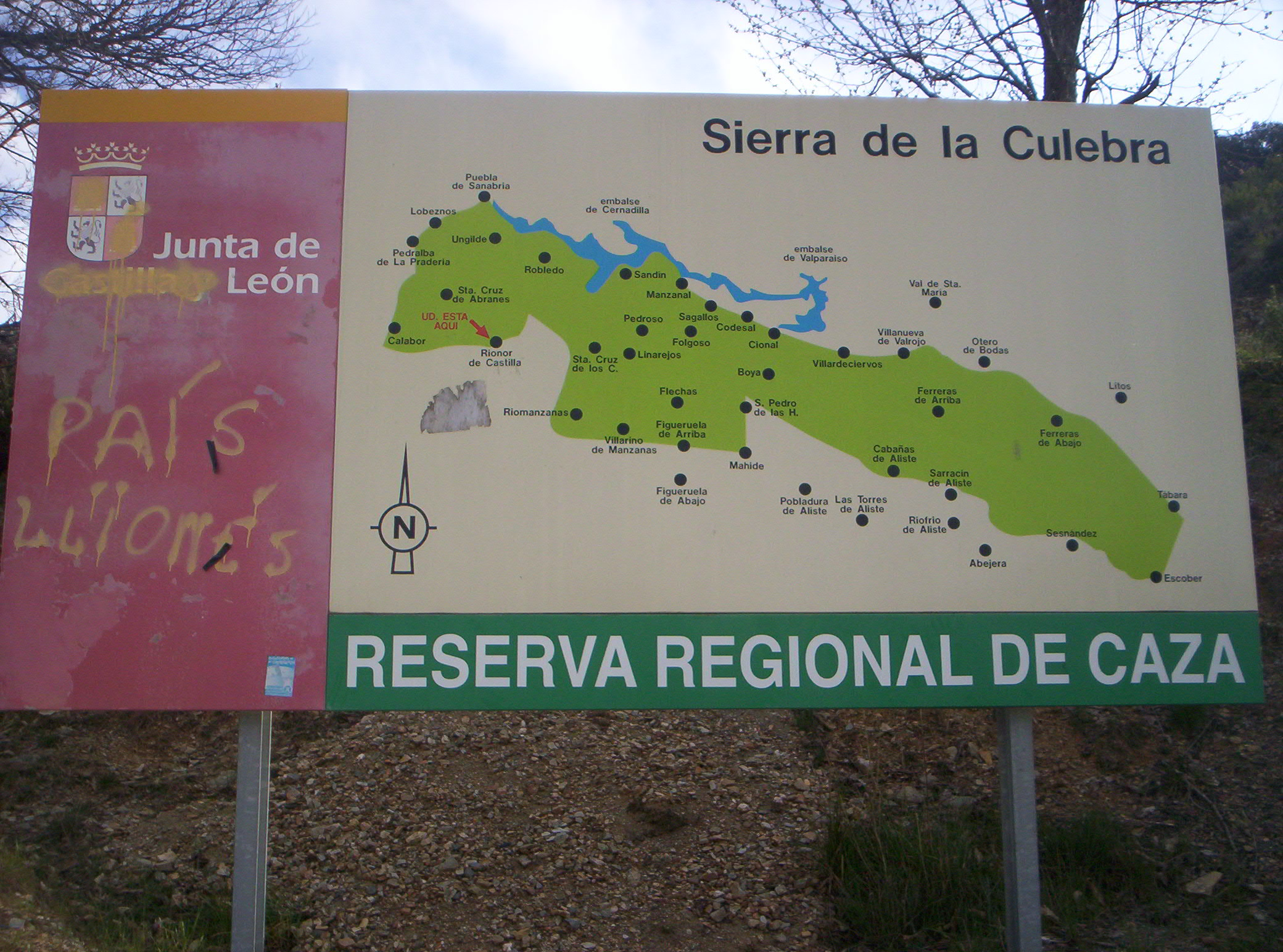
Map of the Natural Reserve at Rihonor de Castilla

== See also ==
- Montesinho Natural Park
