= Henri Justel =

French scholar and royal administrator

- Born: 1619
- Died: 1693 (aged 73–74)
- Other names: Henry Justel, Henricus Justellus
- Occupations: Scholar, Royal Administrator

Henri Justel (1619–1693) was a French scholar and royal administrator, and also a bibliophile and librarian. He is known also as Henry Justel and Henricus Justellus. He was son of the scholar Christophe Justel.

He acted as a secretary to Louis XIV. A Huguenot, he left France in 1681, just ahead of the revocation of the Edict of Nantes, aware in advance of its implications for him. He emigrated to England, where he became a royal librarian at St. James's Palace, continuing to serve under William III.

== Networking ==
As a well-connected intellectual and savant, he corresponded with John Locke, with Robert Boyle, Edmond Halley and Henry Oldenburg of the Royal Society, and with Gottfried Leibniz and Antoine Arnauld. He knew John Evelyn also, and appears in his Diary.

He knew Melchisédech Thévenot, the traveller and like-minded friend, and made a Recueil or collection of travels. He also ran a small 'academy', or intellectual club. He was one of the central members of the République des Lettres, as his friend Pierre Bayle called it, of the later seventeenth century. These connections included Catholic churchmen, such as Daniel Huet and Richard Simon.

== Works ==
- Bibliotheca iuris canonici veteris (1661) editor with G. Voellus, based on his father's work left in manuscript
- Recueil de Divers Voyages Faits en Afrique et en l'Amerique (1674)
