= Manzanal de Arriba =

Coordinates: 41°59′N 6°26′W

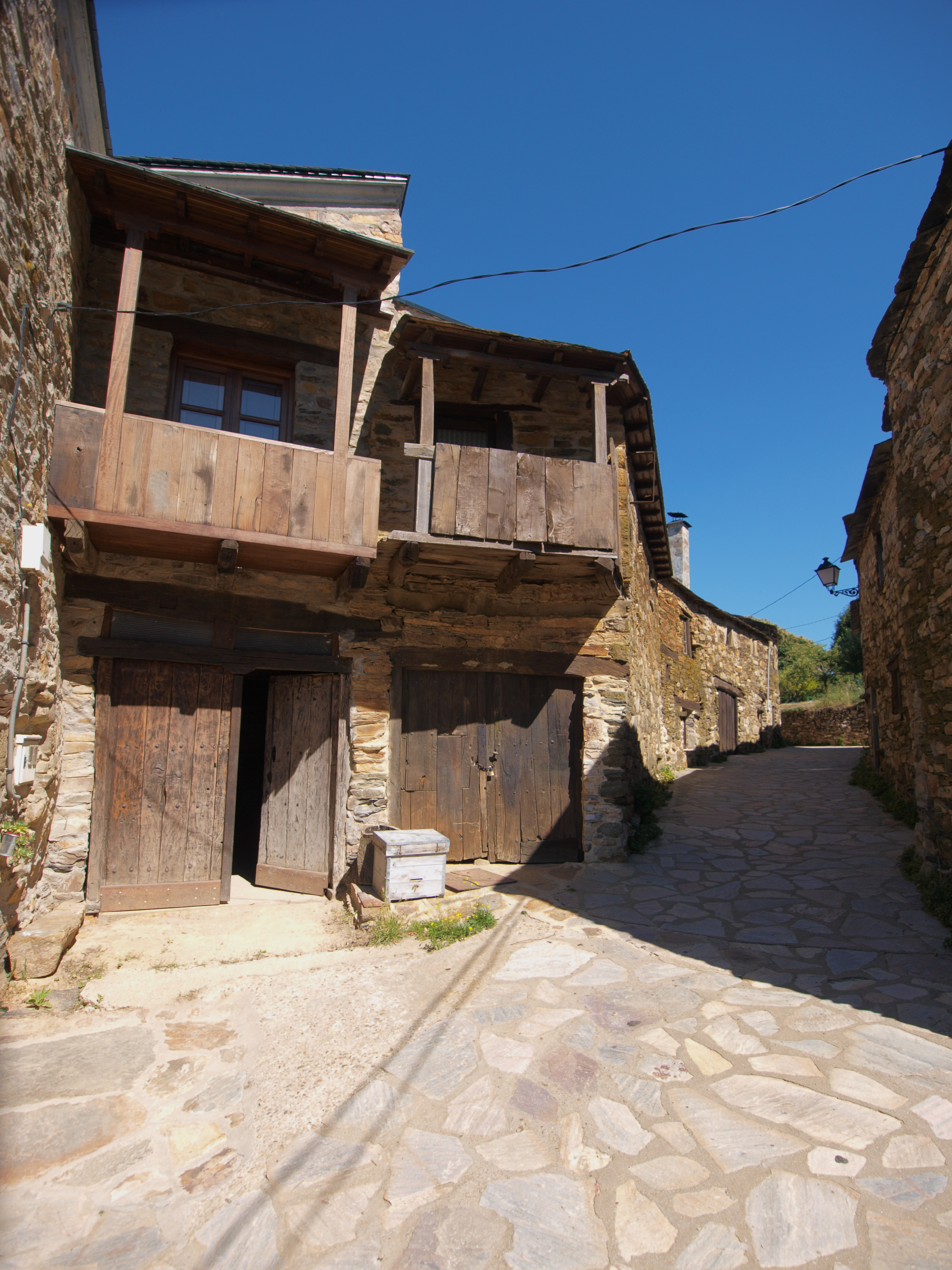

- Flag Coat of arms
- Interactive map of Manzanal de Arriba
- Country: Spain
- Autonomous community: Castile and León
- Province: Zamora
- Comarca: La Carballeda

Area
  - Total: 130 km^{2} (50 sq mi)

Population (2025-01-01)
  - Total: 332
  - Density: 2.6/km^{2} (6.6/sq mi)
- Time zone: UTC+1 (CET)
  - Summer (DST): UTC+2 (CEST)
- Website: Official website

Manzanal de Arriba is a municipality located in the province of Zamora, Castile and León, Spain. According to the 2004 census (INE), the municipality has a population of 439 inhabitants.

== See also ==
- Sandin
- List of municipalities in Zamora
