= Manzanal de los Infantes =

Coordinates: 42°03′N 6°23′W

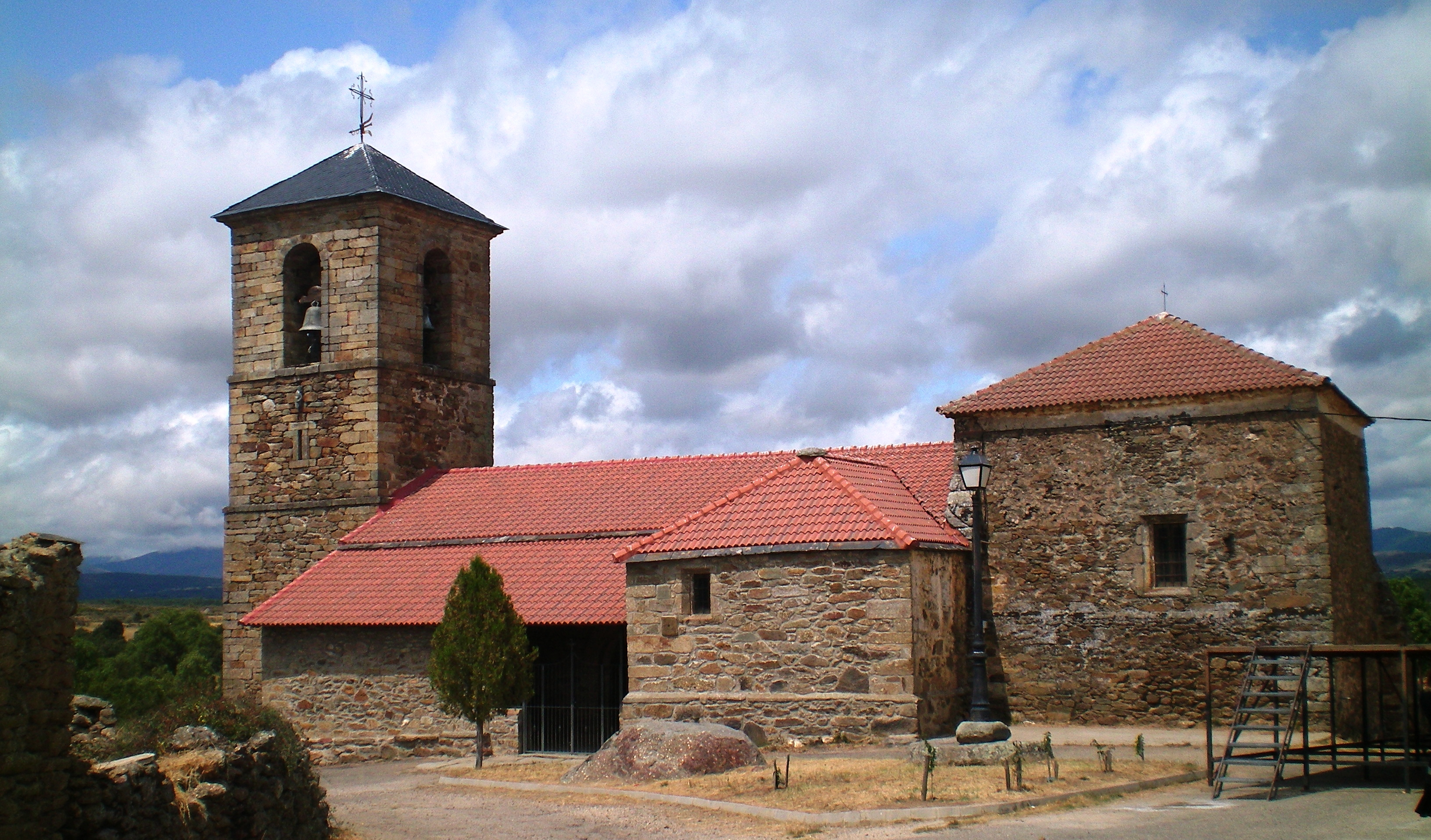
- Interactive map of Manzanal de los Infantes
- Country: Spain
- Autonomous community: Castile and León
- Province: Zamora
- Municipality: Manzanal de los Infantes

Area
  - Total: 64 km^{2} (25 sq mi)

Population (2025-01-01)
  - Total: 133
  - Density: 2.1/km^{2} (5.4/sq mi)
- Time zone: UTC+1 (CET)
  - Summer (DST): UTC+2 (CEST)

Manzanal de los Infantes (Spanish pronunciation: [manθaˈnal de los iɱˈfantes]) is a municipality located in the province of Zamora, Castile and León, Spain. According to the 2004 census (INE), the municipality has a population of 182 inhabitants.
