= Quintanilla del Molar =

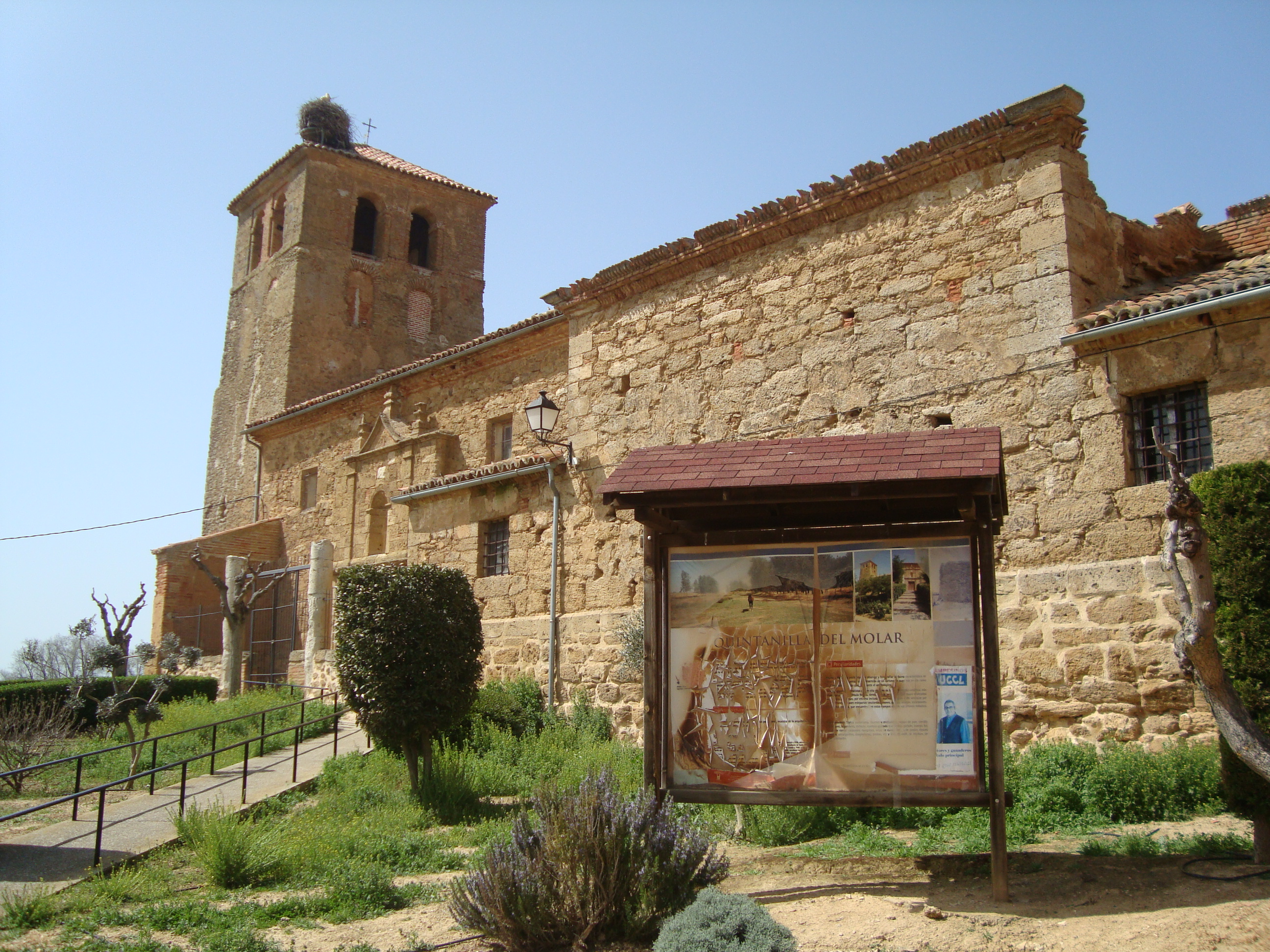
- Church of Saint Thomas (Santo Tomás)

- Coat of arms

- Location of Quintanilla del Molar in Castile and León Location of Quintanilla del Molar in Spain
- Coordinates: 41°59′20.44″N 5°26′57.56″W
- Country: Spain
- Autonomous community: Castile and León
- Province: Valladolid
- Comarca: Tierra de Campos

Government
  - Alcaldesa: María Paz Polo Alonso (PP)

Area
  - Total: 14 km^{2} (5.4 sq mi)

Population (2025-01-01)
  - Total: 43
  - Density: 3.1/km^{2} (8.0/sq mi)
- Time zone: UTC+1 (CET)
  - Summer (DST): UTC+2 (CEST)
- Website: quintanilladelmolar.ayuntamientosdevalladolid.es

Quintanilla del Molar is a municipality located in the province of Valladolid, Castile and León, Spain. According to the 2004 census (INE), the municipality has a population of 83 inhabitants.
