= List of municipalities in Palencia =

Map of Spain with the province of Palencia highlighted

This is a list of the municipalities in the province of Palencia in the autonomous community of Castile-Leon, Spain.

Name	Pop. (2002)
Abarca de Campos	51
Abia de las Torres	201
Aguilar de Campoo	7,565
Alar del Rey	1,242
Alba de Cerrato	97
Amayuelas de Arriba	41
Ampudia	678
Amusco	540
Antigüedad	422
Arconada	57
Astudillo	1,271
Autilla del Pino	245
Autillo de Campos	191
Ayuela	79
Baltanás	1,519
Baquerín de Campos	28
Bárcena de Campos	63
Barruelo de Santullán	1,669
Báscones de Ojeda	198
Becerril de Campos	1,057
Belmonte de Campos	41
Berzosilla	71
Boada de Campos	22
Boadilla de Rioseco	177
Boadilla del Camino	180
Brañosera	289
Buenavista de Valdavia	399
Bustillo de la Vega	376
Bustillo del Páramo de Carrión	90
Calahorra de Boedo	126
Calzada de los Molinos	379
Capillas	107
Cardeñosa de Volpejera	53
Carrión de los Condes	2,380
Castil de Vela	103
Castrejón de la Peña	598
Castrillo de Don Juan	336
Castrillo de Onielo	171
Castrillo de Villavega	285
Castromocho	258
Cervatos de la Cueza	363
Cervera de Pisuerga	2,674
Cevico de la Torre	632
Cevico Navero	254
Cisneros	574
Cobos de Cerrato	234
Collazos de Boedo	154
Congosto de Valdavia	270
Cordovilla la Real	123
Cubillas de Cerrato	83
Dehesa de Montejo	215
Dehesa de Romanos	46
Dueñas	2,985
Espinosa de Cerrato	258
Espinosa de Villagonzalo	244
Frechilla	254
Fresno del Río	193
Frómista	936
Fuentes de Nava	804
Fuentes de Valdepero	244
Grijota	922
Guardo	8,337
Guaza de Campos	71
Hérmedes de Cerrato	129
Herrera de Pisuerga	2,531
Herrera de Valdecañas	196
Hontoria de Cerrato	120
Hornillos de Cerrato	118
Husillos	230
Itero de la Vega	231
Lagartos	170
Lantadilla	486
Ledigos	103
Loma de Ucieza	316
Lomas	57
Magaz de Pisuerga	735
Manquillos	68
Mantinos	179
Marcilla de Campos	66
Mazariegos	273
Mazuecos de Valdeginate	127
Melgar de Yuso	369
Meneses de Campos	146
Micieces de Ojeda	106
Monzón de Campos	722
Moratinos	78
Mudá	116
Nogal de las Huertas	66
Olea de Boedo	45
Olmos de Ojeda	318
Osornillo	93
Osorno la Mayor	1,637
Palencia	80,801
Palenzuela	300
Páramo de Boedo	107
Paredes de Nava	2,366
Payo de Ojeda	95
Pedraza de Campos	122
Pedrosa de la Vega	375
Perales	105
La Pernía	474
Pino del Río	278
Piña de Campos	276
Población de Arroyo	92
Población de Campos	188
Población de Cerrato	127
Polentinos	86
Pomar de Valdivia	538
Poza de la Vega	280
Pozo de Urama	42
Prádanos de Ojeda	237
La Puebla de Valdavia	152
Quintana del Puente	259
Quintanilla de Onsoña	227
Reinoso de Cerrato	85
Renedo de la Vega	250
Requena de Campos	53
Respenda de la Peña	247
Revenga de Campos	189
Revilla de Collazos	83
Ribas de Campos	209
Riberos de la Cueza	84
Saldaña	3,215
Salinas de Pisuerga	259
San Cebrián de Campos	518
San Cebrián de Mudá	194
San Cristóbal de Boedo	43
San Mamés de Campos	96
San Román de la Cuba	110
Santa Cecilia del Alcor	160
Santa Cruz de Boedo	65
Santervás de la Vega	526
Santibáñez de Ecla	97
Santibáñez de la Peña	1,471
Santoyo	285
La Serna	127
Soto de Cerrato	223
Sotobañado y Priorato	181
Tabanera de Cerrato	165
Tabanera de Valdavia	52
Támara de Campos	94
Tariego de Cerrato	572
Torquemada	1,142
Torremormojón	82
Triollo	91
Valbuena de Pisuerga	71
Valdeolmillos	82
Valderrábano	76
Valde-Ucieza	122
Valle de Cerrato	119
Valle del Retortillo	204
Velilla del Río Carrión	1,717
Venta de Baños	6,024
Vertavillo	217
La Vid de Ojeda	137
Villabasta de Valdavia	40
Villacidaler	70
Villaconancio	88
Villada	1,268
Villaeles de Valdavia	85
Villahán	135
Villaherreros	256
Villalaco	75
Villalba de Guardo	242
Villalcázar de Sirga	235
Villalcón	81
Villalobón	431
Villaluenga de la Vega	673
Villamartín de Campos	148
Villamediana	233
Villameriel	148
Villamoronta	315
Villamuera de la Cueza	62
Villamuriel de Cerrato	5,070
Villanueva del Rebollar	96
Villanuño de Valdavia	128
Villaprovedo	93
Villarmentero de Campos	14
Villarrabé	259
Villarramiel	1,042
Villasarracino	250
Villasila de Valdavia	97
Villaturde	242
Villaumbrales	864
Villavega	40
Villaviudas	458
Villerías de Campos	126
Villodre	42
Villodrigo	115
Villoldo	479
Villota del Duque	61
Villota del Páramo	433
Villovieco	113

== See also ==
- Geography of Spain
- List of cities in Spain
