= Villalcón =

Coordinates: 42°17′N 4°51′W

- municipality
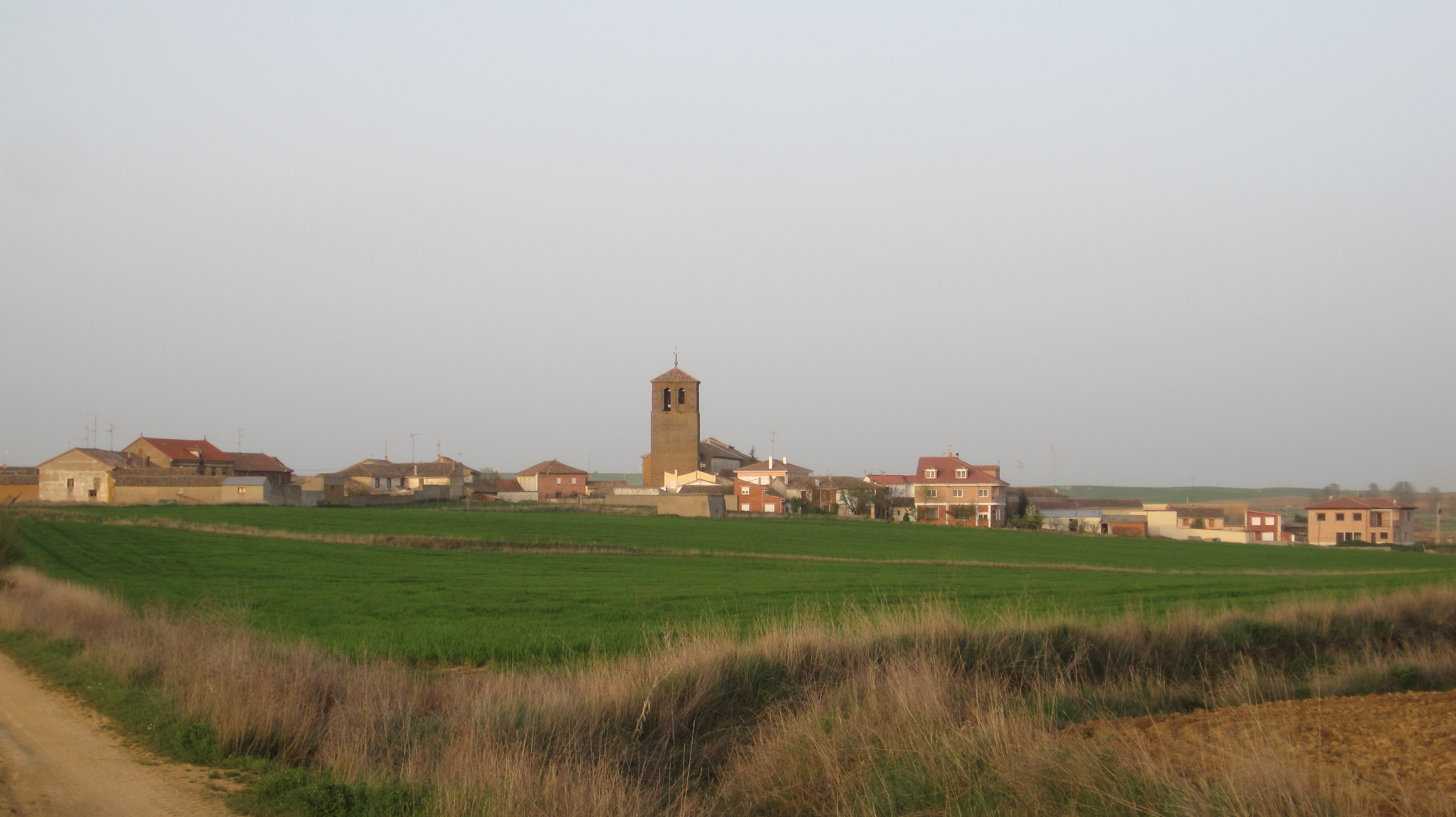
- Interactive map of Villalcón
- Country: Spain
- Autonomous community: Castile and León
- Province: Palencia
- Municipality: Villalcón

Area
  - Total: 26 km^{2} (10 sq mi)

Population (2025-01-01)
  - Total: 45
  - Density: 1.7/km^{2} (4.5/sq mi)
- Time zone: UTC+1 (CET)
  - Summer (DST): UTC+2 (CEST)
- Website: Official website

Villalcón is a municipality located in the province of Palencia, Castile and León, Spain. According to the 2004 census (INE), the municipality has a population of 82 inhabitants.
