= Loma de Ucieza =

Coordinates: 42°26′29.11″N 4°34′44.80″W

- municipality
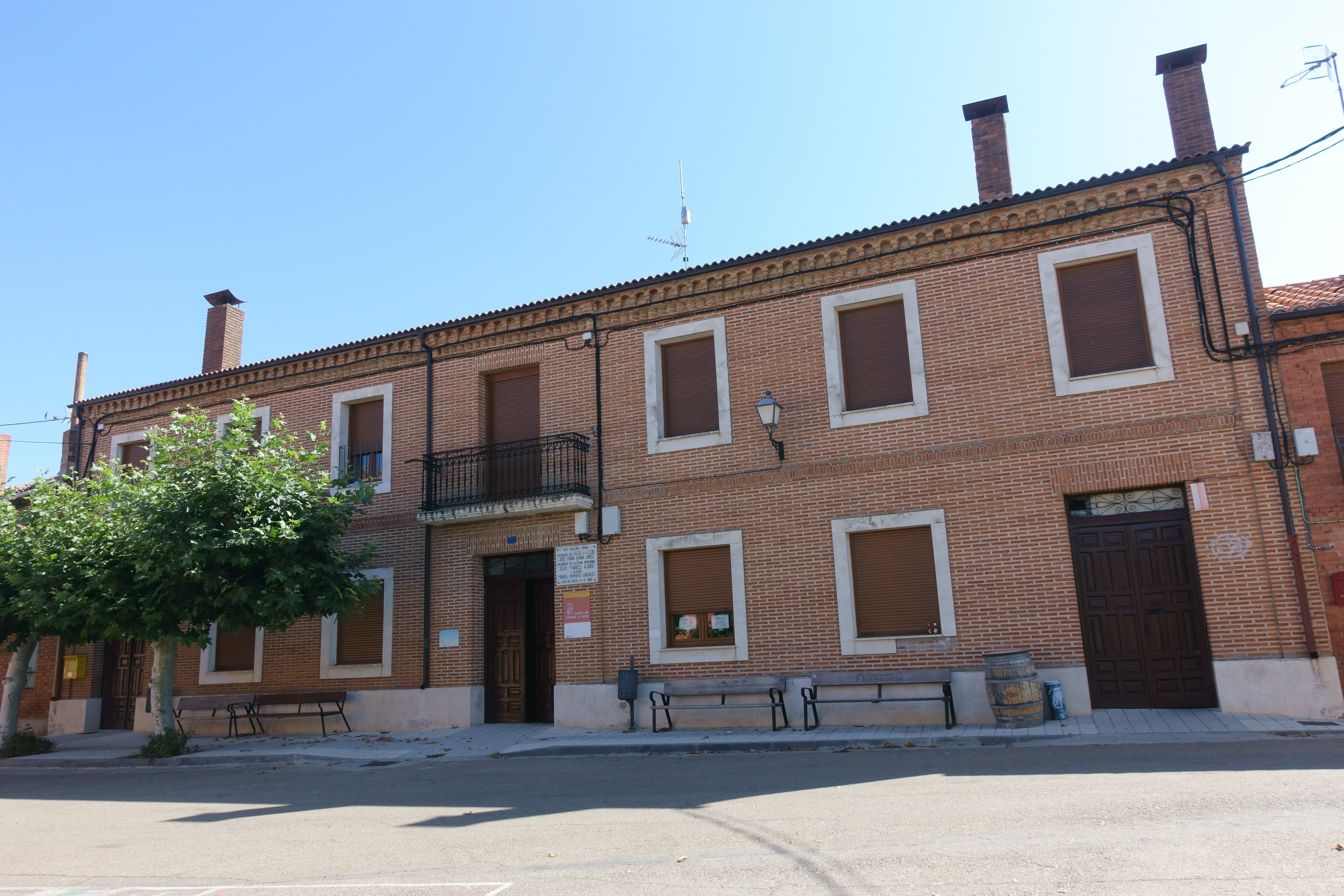
- Interactive map of Loma de Ucieza
- Country: Spain
- Autonomous community: Castile and León
- Province: Palencia
- Municipality: Loma de Ucieza

Area
  - Total: 71 km^{2} (27 sq mi)

Population (2025-01-01)
  - Total: 186
  - Density: 2.6/km^{2} (6.8/sq mi)
- Time zone: UTC+1 (CET)
  - Summer (DST): UTC+2 (CEST)
- Website: Official website

Loma de Ucieza is a municipality located in the province of Palencia, Castile and León, Spain. According to the 2004 census (INE), the municipality has a population of 298 inhabitants.
