= Calahorra de Boedo =

Coordinates: 42°34′N 4°23′W

- municipality
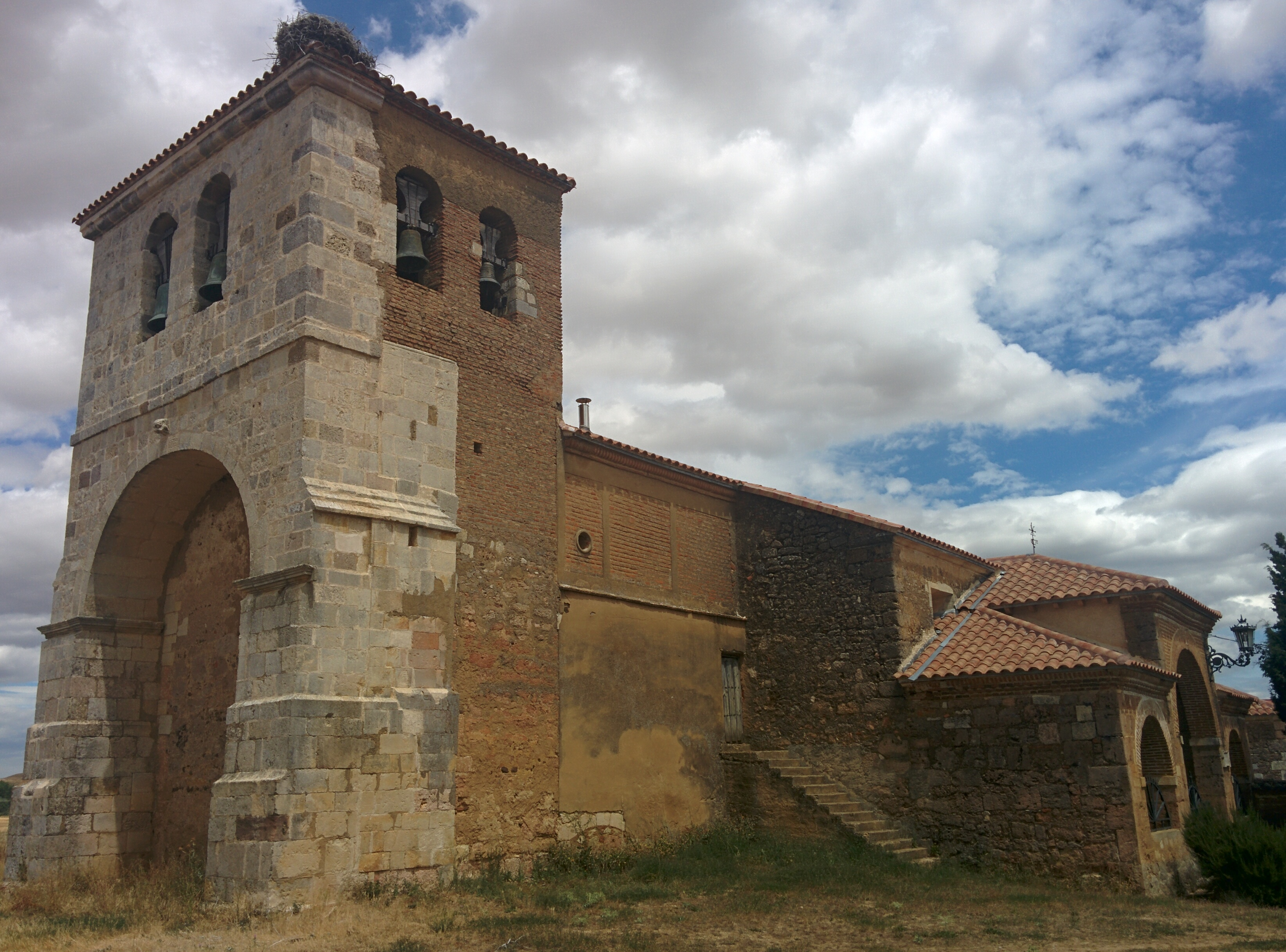

- Flag Coat of arms
- Interactive map of Calahorra de Boedo
- Country: Spain
- Autonomous community: Castile and León
- Province: Palencia
- Municipality: Calahorra de Boedo

Area
  - Total: 17.99 km^{2} (6.95 sq mi)
- Elevation: 855 m (2,805 ft)

Population (2025-01-01)
  - Total: 82
  - Density: 4.6/km^{2} (12/sq mi)
- Time zone: UTC+1 (CET)
  - Summer (DST): UTC+2 (CEST)
- Website: Official website

Calahorra de Boedo is a municipality located in the province of Palencia, Castile and León, Spain. According to the 2004 census (INE), the municipality had a population of 125 inhabitants.
