= San Cristóbal de Boedo =

Coordinates: 42°33′N 4°21′W

- municipality
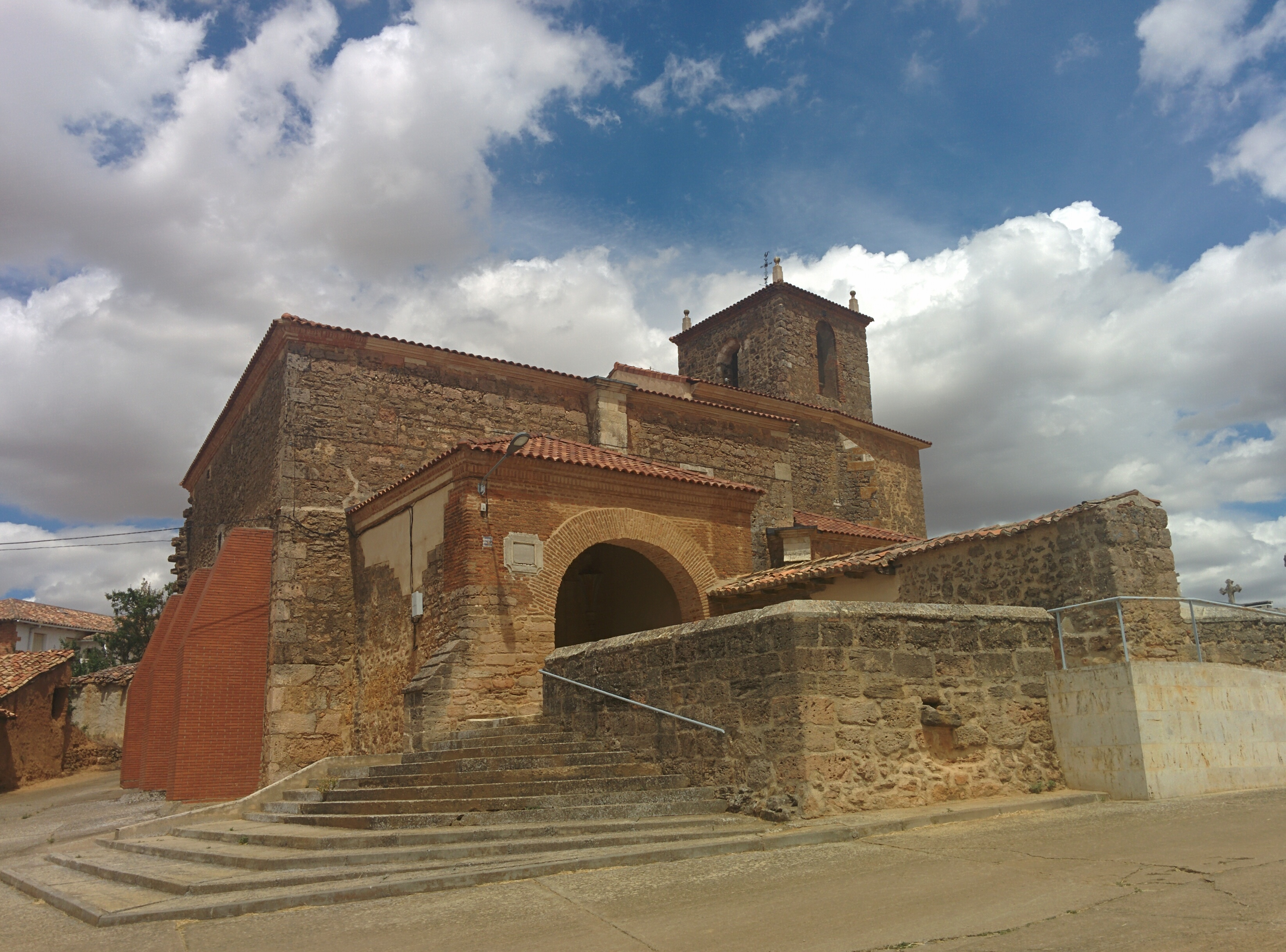
- Interactive map of San Cristóbal de Boedo
- Country: Spain
- Autonomous community: Castile and León
- Province: Palencia
- Municipality: San Cristóbal de Boedo

Area
  - Total: 10 km^{2} (3.9 sq mi)

Population (2025-01-01)
  - Total: 20
  - Density: 2.0/km^{2} (5.2/sq mi)
- Time zone: UTC+1 (CET)
  - Summer (DST): UTC+2 (CEST)
- Website: Official website

San Cristóbal de Boedo is a municipality located in the province of Palencia, Castile and León, Spain. According to the 2004 census (INE), the municipality has a population of only thirty-eight inhabitants.
