= Santibáñez de Ecla =

- municipality
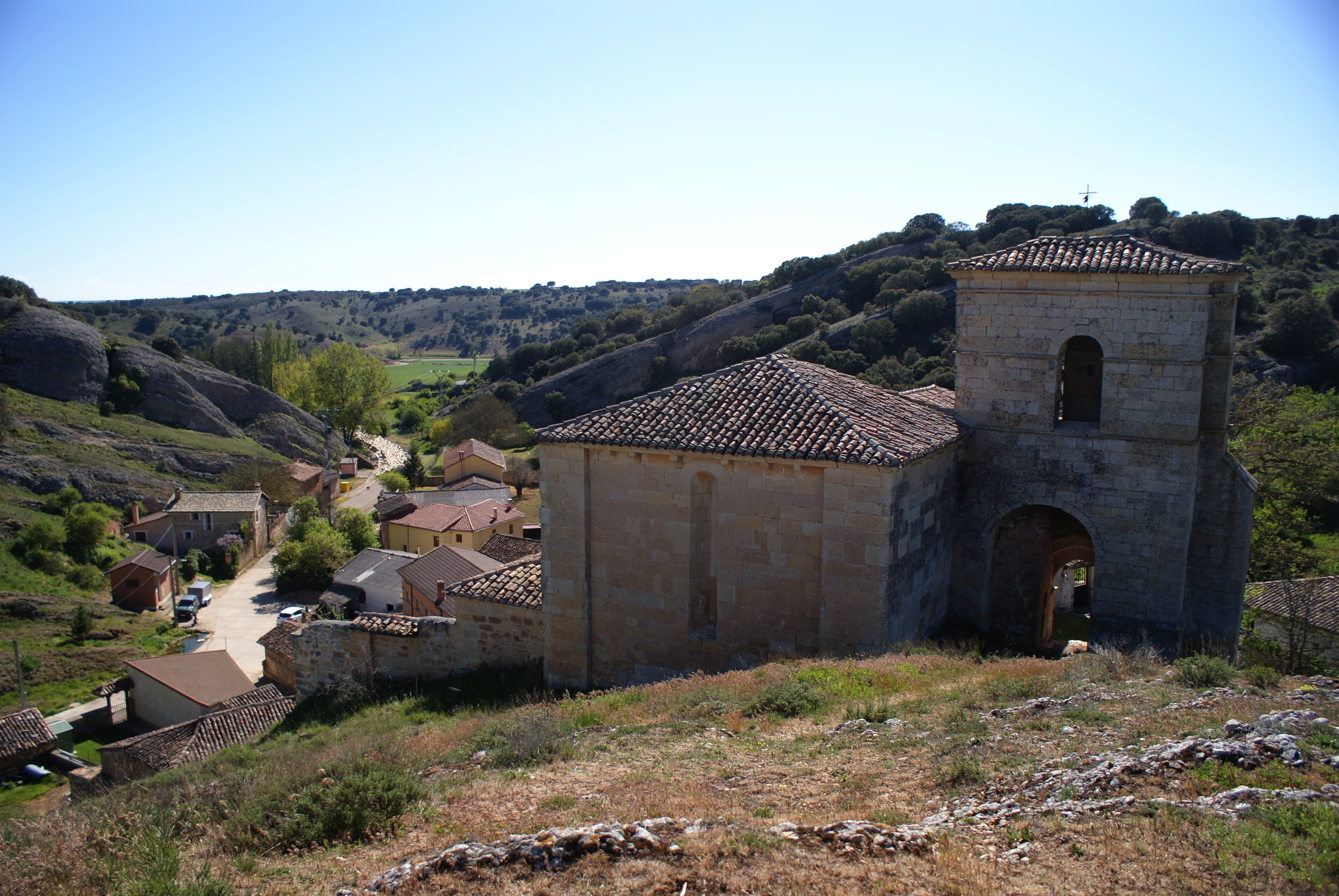
- Interactive map of Santibáñez de Ecla
- Coordinates: 42°42′29″N 4°22′26″W
- Country: Spain
- Autonomous community: Castile and León
- Province: Palencia
- Municipality: Santibáñez de Ecla

Area
  - Total: 25 km^{2} (9.7 sq mi)

Population (2025-01-01)
  - Total: 42
  - Density: 1.7/km^{2} (4.4/sq mi)
- Time zone: UTC+1 (CET)
  - Summer (DST): UTC+2 (CEST)
- Website: Official website

Santibáñez de Ecla is a municipality located in the province of Palencia, Castile and León, Spain. According to the 2004 census (INE), the municipality has a population of 87 inhabitants.
