= Villamuera de la Cueza =

Coordinates: 42°16′N 4°41′W

- municipality
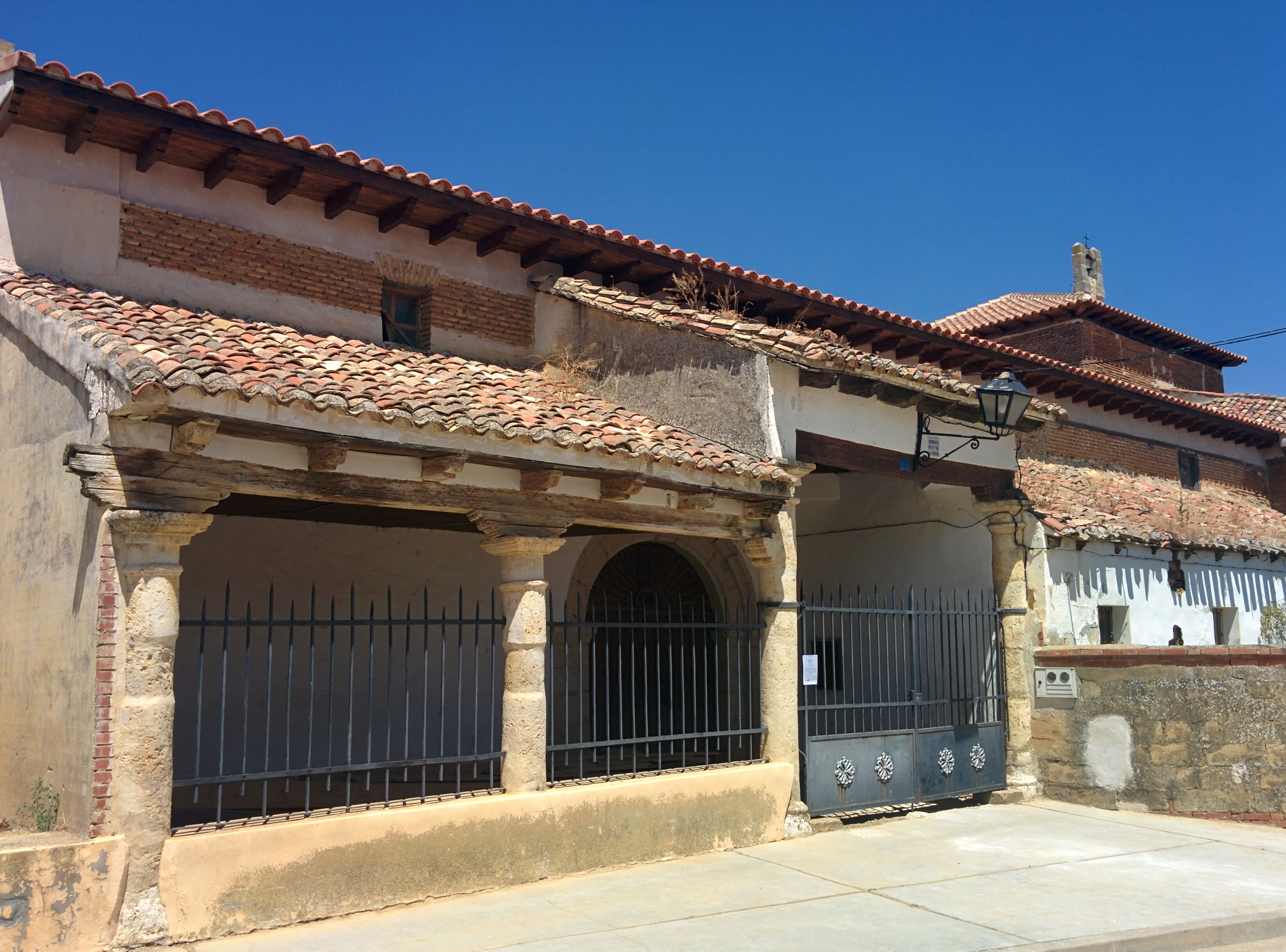
- Interactive map of Villamuera de la Cueza
- Country: Spain
- Autonomous community: Castile and León
- Province: Palencia
- Municipality: Villamuera de la Cueza

Area
  - Total: 25.18 km^{2} (9.72 sq mi)
- Elevation: 807 m (2,648 ft)

Population (2025-01-01)
  - Total: 36
  - Density: 1.4/km^{2} (3.7/sq mi)
- Time zone: UTC+1 (CET)
  - Summer (DST): UTC+2 (CEST)
- Website: Official website

Villamuera de la Cueza is a municipality located in the province of Palencia, Castile and León, Spain. According to the 2022 census (INE), the municipality had a population of 38 inhabitants.
