= Pino del Río =

Coordinates: 42°39′N 4°48′W

- municipality
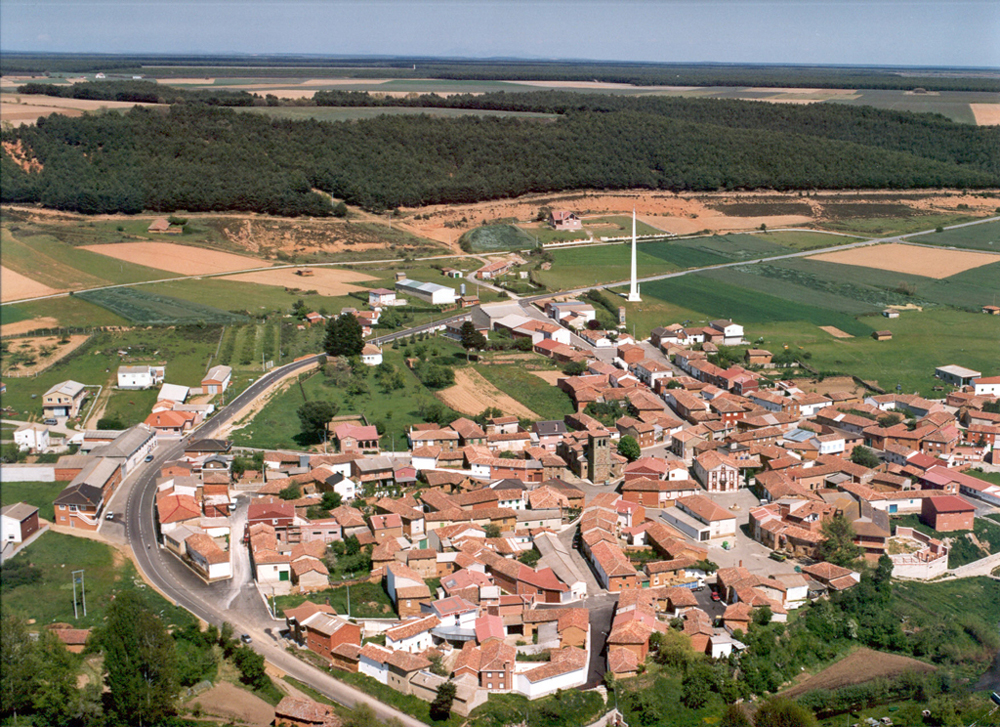

- Flag Coat of arms
- Interactive map of Pino del Río
- Country: Spain
- Autonomous community: Castile and León
- Province: Palencia
- Municipality: Pino del Río

Area
  - Total: 52 km^{2} (20 sq mi)

Population (2025-01-01)
  - Total: 162
  - Density: 3.1/km^{2} (8.1/sq mi)
- Time zone: UTC+1 (CET)
  - Summer (DST): UTC+2 (CEST)
- Website: Official website

Pino del Río is a municipality located in the province of Palencia, Castile and León, Spain. According to the 2018 census (INE), the municipality had a population of 179 inhabitants.
