= Herrera de Valdecañas =

Coordinates: 42°03′N 4°12′W

- municipality
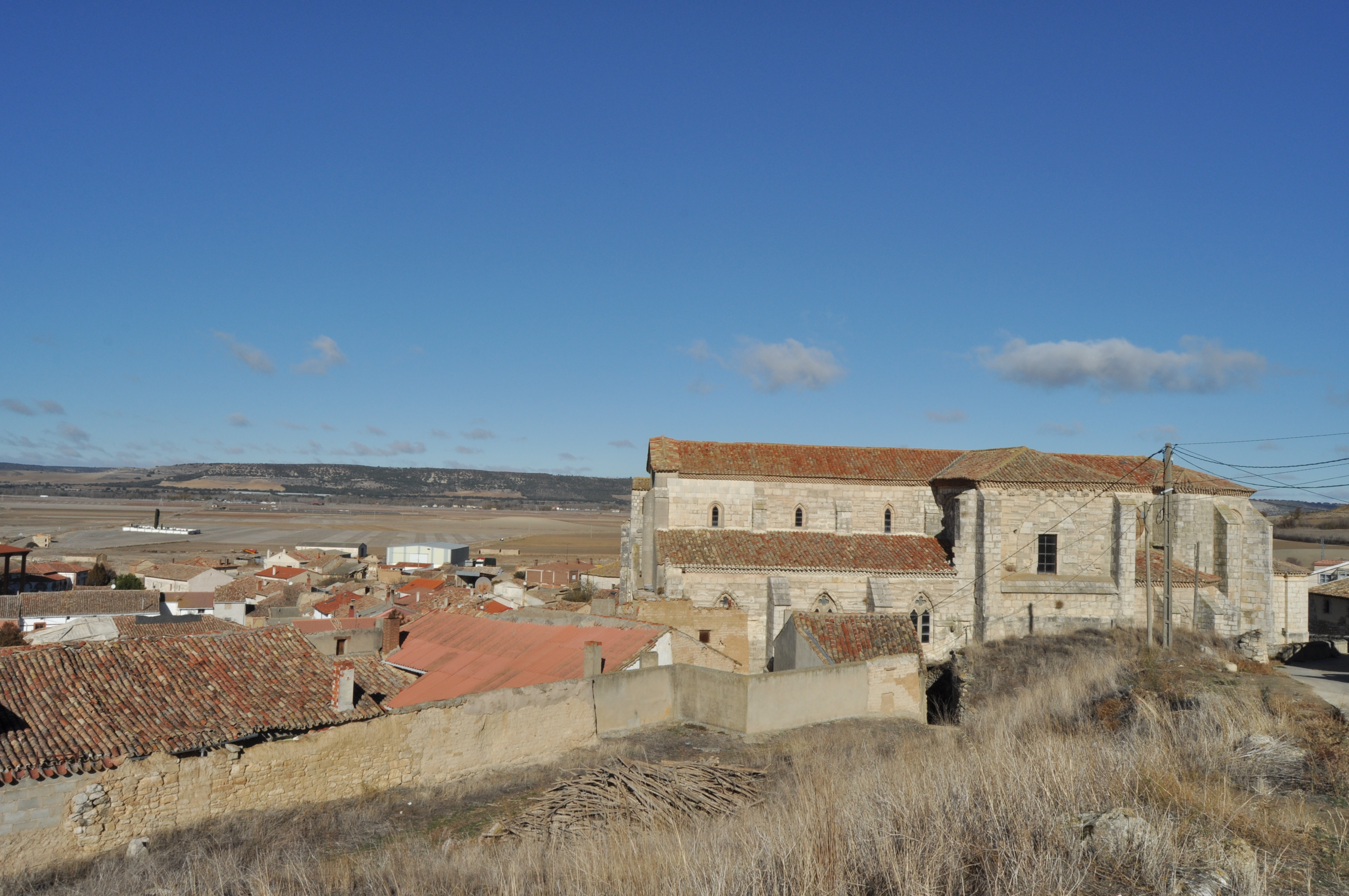

- Flag Coat of arms
- Interactive map of Herrera de Valdecañas
- Country: Spain
- Autonomous community: Castile and León
- Province: Palencia
- Municipality: Herrera de Valdecañas

Area
  - Total: 27 km^{2} (10 sq mi)

Population (2025-01-01)
  - Total: 148
  - Density: 5.5/km^{2} (14/sq mi)
- Time zone: UTC+1 (CET)
  - Summer (DST): UTC+2 (CEST)
- Website: Official website

Herrera de Valdecañas is a municipality located in the province of Palencia, Castile and León, Spain. According to the 2004 census (INE), the municipality has a population of 180 inhabitants.
