= Lagartos =

Coordinates: 42°24′N 4°52′W

- municipality
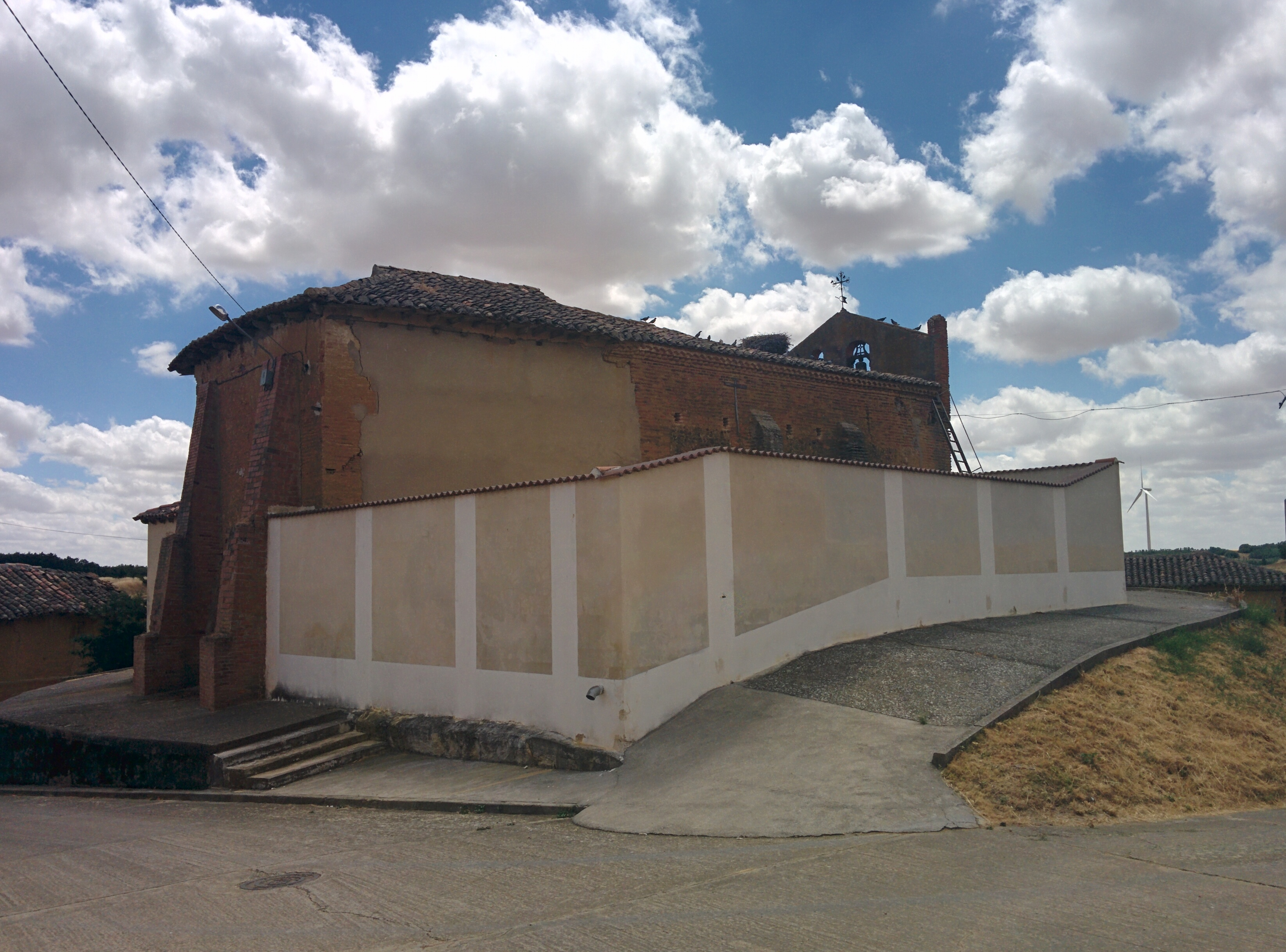
- Interactive map of Lagartos
- Country: Spain
- Autonomous community: Castile and León
- Province: Palencia
- Municipality: Lagartos

Area
  - Total: 43 km^{2} (17 sq mi)

Population (2025-01-01)
  - Total: 117
  - Density: 2.7/km^{2} (7.0/sq mi)
- Time zone: UTC+1 (CET)
  - Summer (DST): UTC+2 (CEST)
- Website: Official website

Lagartos is a municipality located in the province of Palencia, Castile and León, Spain. According to the 2004 census (INE), the municipality has a population of 147 inhabitants.
