= Hérmedes de Cerrato =

Coordinates: 41°49′N 4°10′W

- municipality
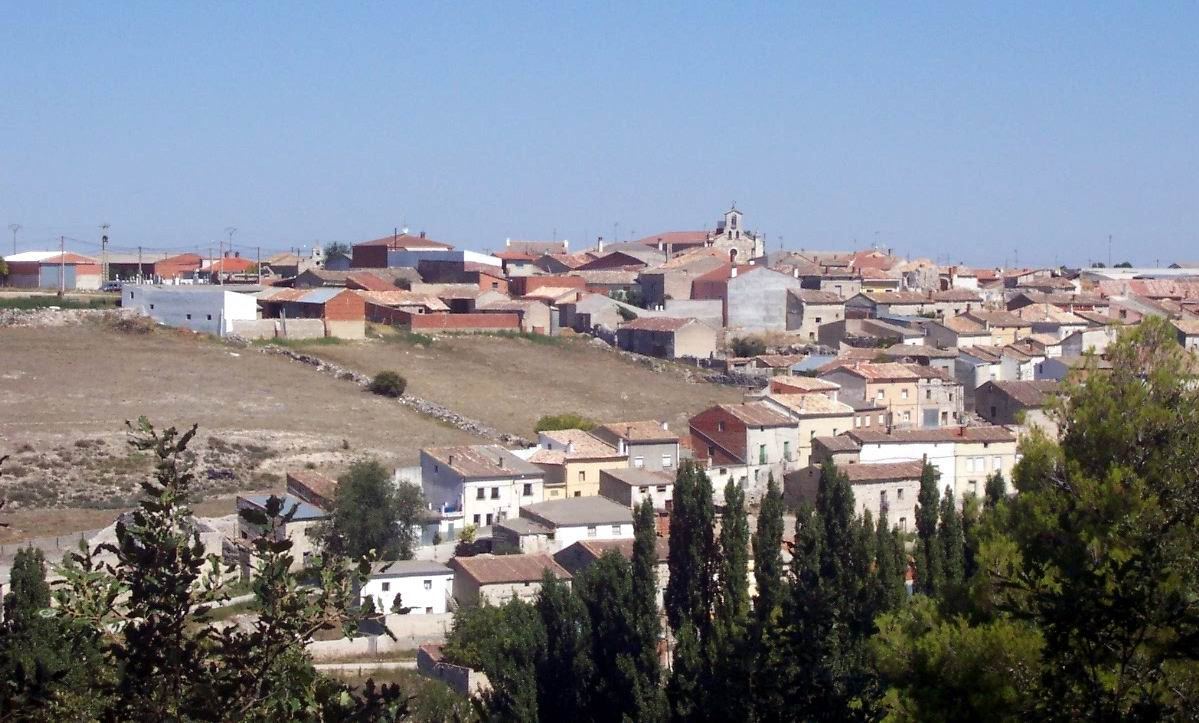
- Interactive map of Hérmedes de Cerrato
- Country: Spain
- Autonomous community: Castile and León
- Province: Palencia
- Municipality: Hérmedes de Cerrato

Area
  - Total: 32 km^{2} (12 sq mi)

Population (2025-01-01)
  - Total: 72
  - Density: 2.2/km^{2} (5.8/sq mi)
- Time zone: UTC+1 (CET)
  - Summer (DST): UTC+2 (CEST)
- Website: Official website

Hérmedes de Cerrato is a municipality located in the province of Palencia, Castile and León, Spain. According to the 2004 census (INE), the municipality has a population of 122 inhabitants.
