= Olea de Boedo =

Coordinates: 42°37′N 4°27′W

- municipality
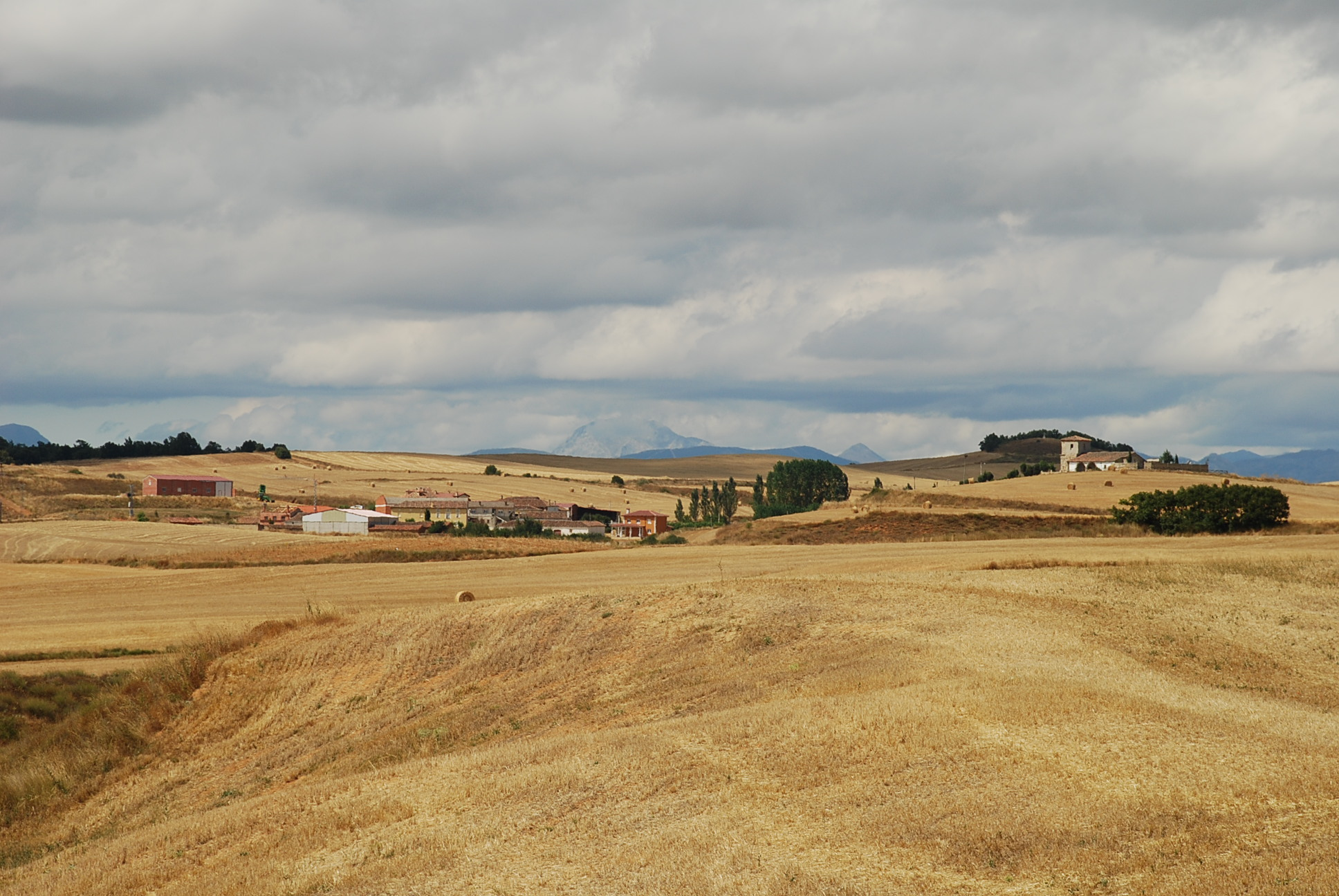
- Interactive map of Olea de Boedo
- Country: Spain
- Autonomous community: Castile and León
- Province: Palencia
- Municipality: Olea de Boedo

Area
  - Total: 8 km^{2} (3.1 sq mi)

Population (2025-01-01)
  - Total: 38
  - Density: 4.8/km^{2} (12/sq mi)
- Time zone: UTC+1 (CET)
  - Summer (DST): UTC+2 (CEST)
- Website: Official website

Olea de Boedo is a municipality located in the province of Palencia, Castile and León, Spain. According to the 2004 census (INE), the municipality has a population of 42.
