= Ayuela =

Coordinates: 42°37′56″N 4°40′04″W

- municipality
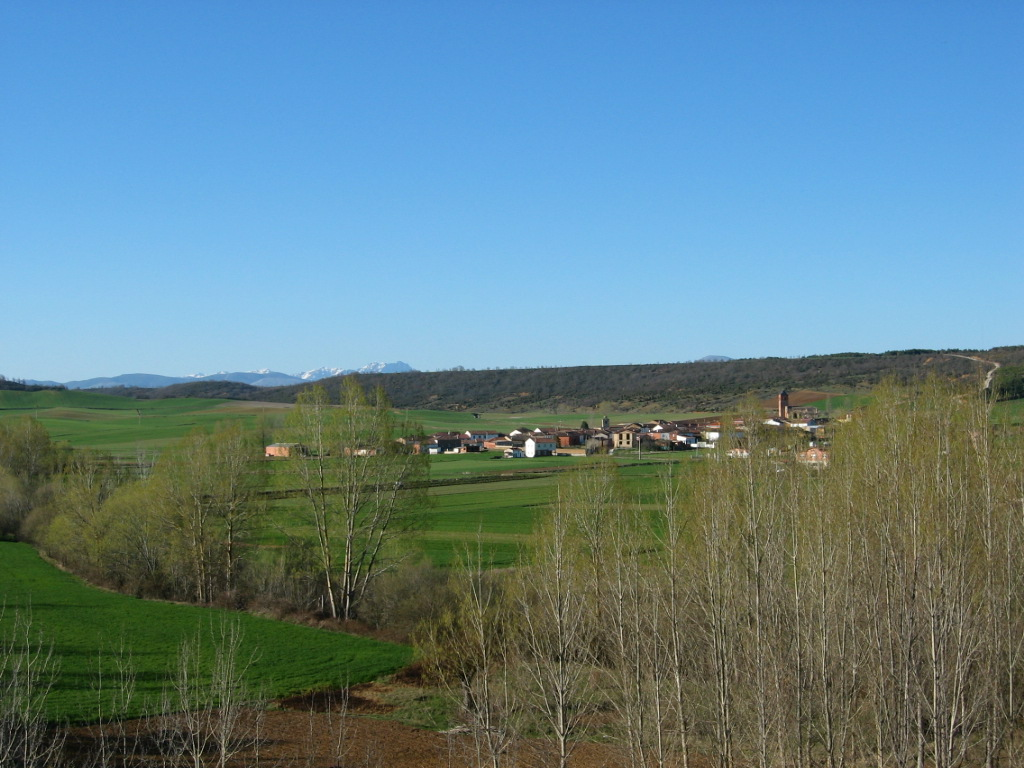
- Interactive map of Ayuela
- Country: Spain
- Autonomous community: Castile and León
- Province: Palencia
- Municipality: Ayuela

Area
  - Total: 19 km^{2} (7.3 sq mi)

Population (2025-01-01)
  - Total: 48
  - Density: 2.5/km^{2} (6.5/sq mi)
- Time zone: UTC+1 (CET)
  - Summer (DST): UTC+2 (CEST)
- Website: https://ayuela.es

Ayuela is a municipality located in the province of Palencia, Castile and León, Spain. It is located about 80 km from the capital of the province and 125 km of autonomous capital Valladolid. According to the 2004 census (INE), the municipality has a population of 69 inhabitants.
