= Castil de Vela =

Coordinates: 41°59′N 4°57′W

- municipality
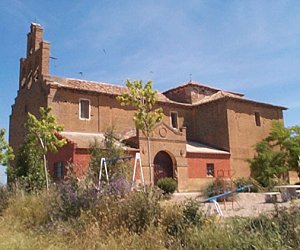
- Interactive map of Castil de Vela
- Country: Spain
- Autonomous community: Castile and León
- Province: Palencia
- Municipality: Castil de Vela

Area
  - Total: 23 km^{2} (8.9 sq mi)

Population (2025-01-01)
  - Total: 54
  - Density: 2.3/km^{2} (6.1/sq mi)
- Time zone: UTC+1 (CET)
  - Summer (DST): UTC+2 (CEST)
- Website: Official website

Castil de Vela is a municipality located in the province of Palencia, Castile and León, Spain. According to the 2004 census (INE), the municipality has a population of 91 inhabitants.
