= San Mamés de Campos =

Coordinates: 42°21′N 4°34′W

- municipality
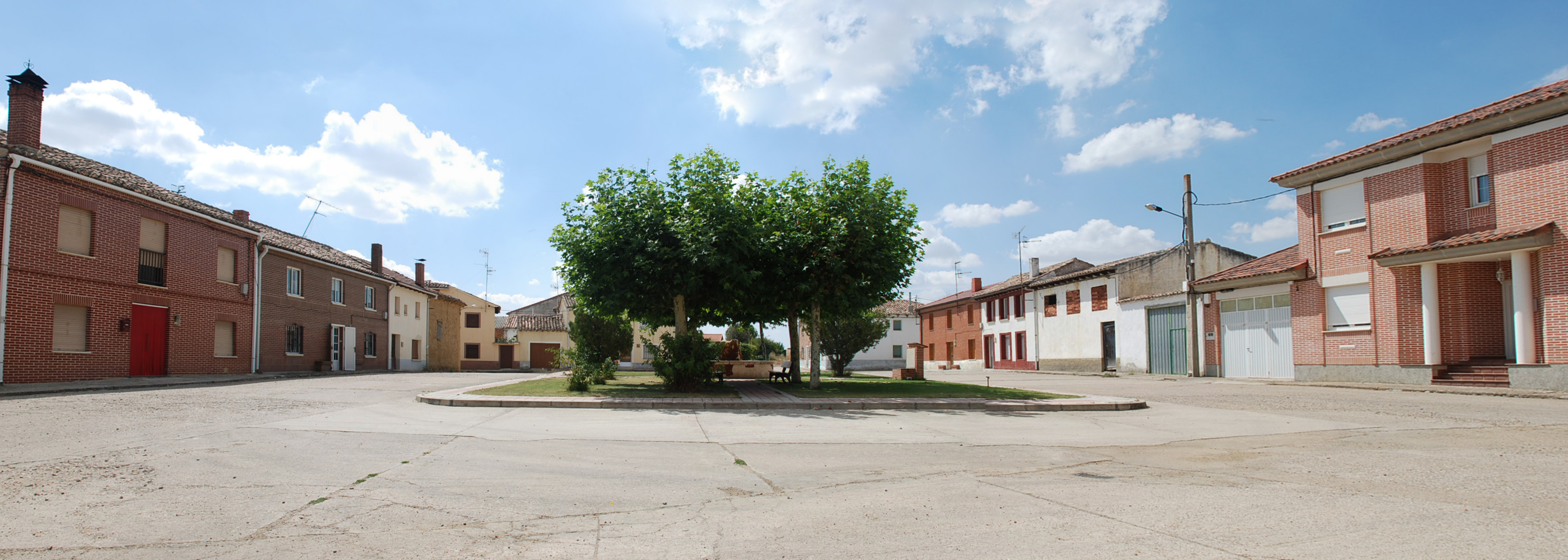
- Interactive map of San Mamés de Campos
- Country: Spain
- Autonomous community: Castile and León
- Province: Palencia
- Municipality: San Mamés de Campos

Area
  - Total: 15.54 km^{2} (6.00 sq mi)
- Elevation: 822 m (2,697 ft)

Population (2025-01-01)
  - Total: 44
  - Density: 2.8/km^{2} (7.3/sq mi)
- Time zone: UTC+1 (CET)
  - Summer (DST): UTC+2 (CEST)
- Website: Official website

San Mamés de Campos is a municipality located in the province of Palencia, Castile and León, Spain. According to the 2004 census (INE), the municipality has a population of 90 inhabitants.
