= Hontoria de Cerrato =

Coordinates: 41°55′N 4°26′W

- municipality
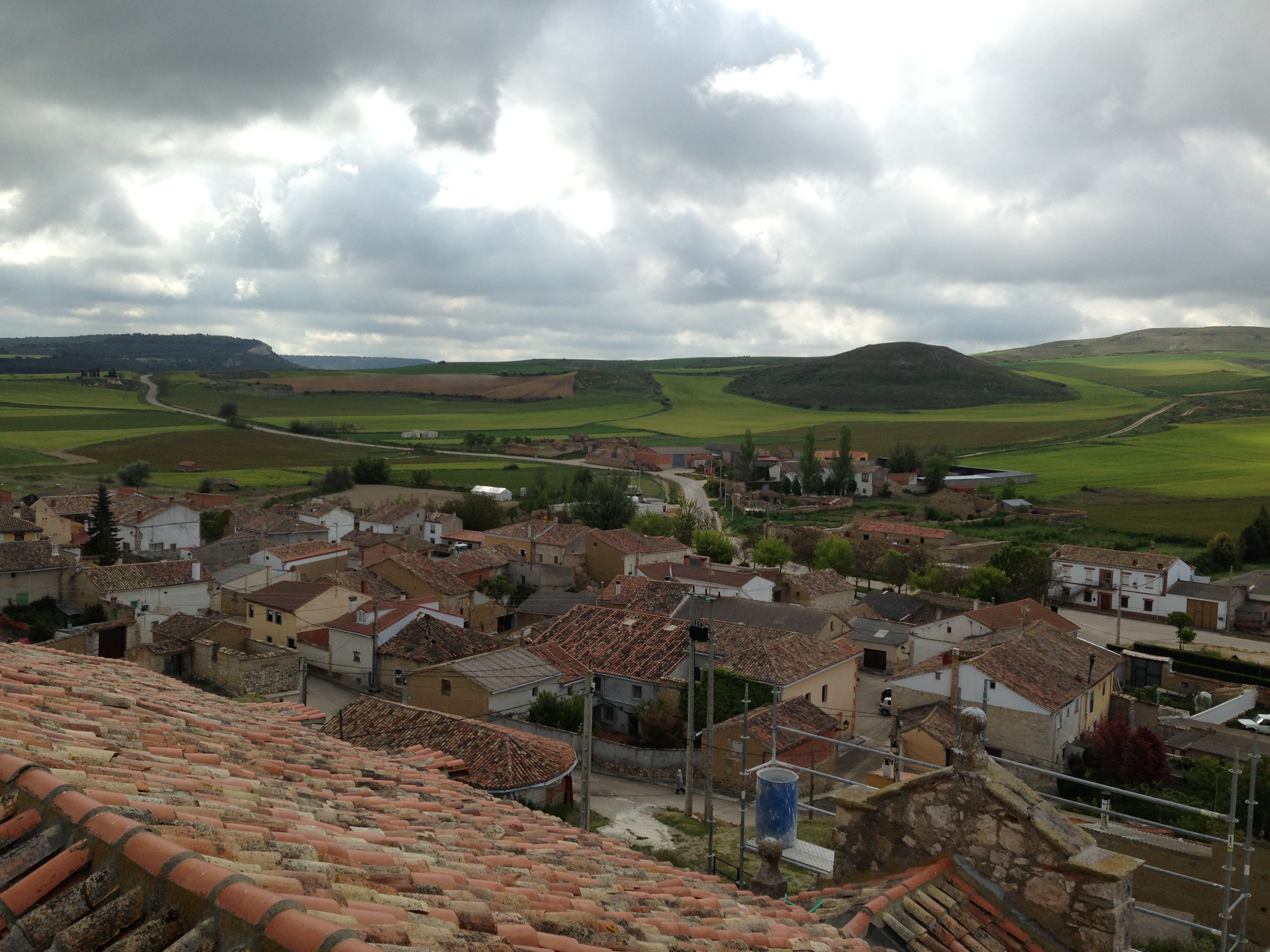

- Flag Coat of arms
- Interactive map of Hontoria de Cerrato
- Country: Spain
- Autonomous community: Castile and León
- Province: Palencia
- Municipality: Hontoria de Cerrato

Area
  - Total: 29 km^{2} (11 sq mi)

Population (2025-01-01)
  - Total: 108
  - Density: 3.7/km^{2} (9.6/sq mi)
- Time zone: UTC+1 (CET)
  - Summer (DST): UTC+2 (CEST)
- Website: Official website

Hontoria de Cerrato is a municipality located in the province of Palencia, Castile and León, Spain. According to the 2018 census (INE), the municipality has a population of 103 inhabitants.
