= Villaluenga de la Vega =

Coordinates: 42°31′N 4°46′W

- municipality
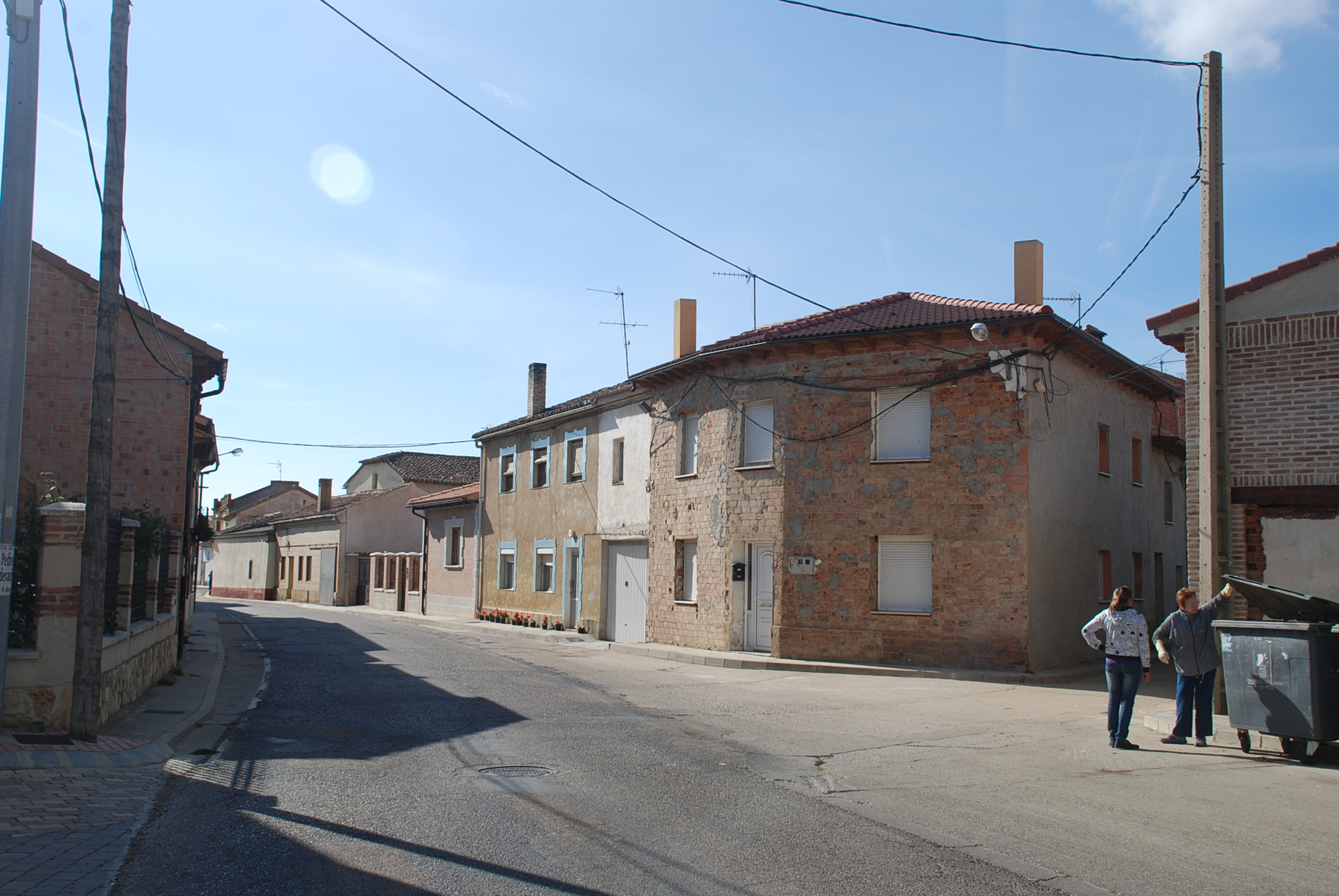
- Interactive map of Villaluenga de la Vega
- Country: Spain
- Autonomous community: Castile and León
- Province: Palencia
- Municipality: Villaluenga de la Vega

Area
  - Total: 26 km^{2} (10 sq mi)

Population (2025-01-01)
  - Total: 519
  - Density: 20/km^{2} (52/sq mi)
- Time zone: UTC+1 (CET)
  - Summer (DST): UTC+2 (CEST)
- Website: Official website

Villaluenga de la Vega is a municipality located in the province of Palencia, Castile and León, Spain. According to the 2004 census (INE), the municipality has a population of 667 inhabitants.
