= Mazuecos de Valdeginate =

Coordinates: 42°10′N 4°50′W

- municipality
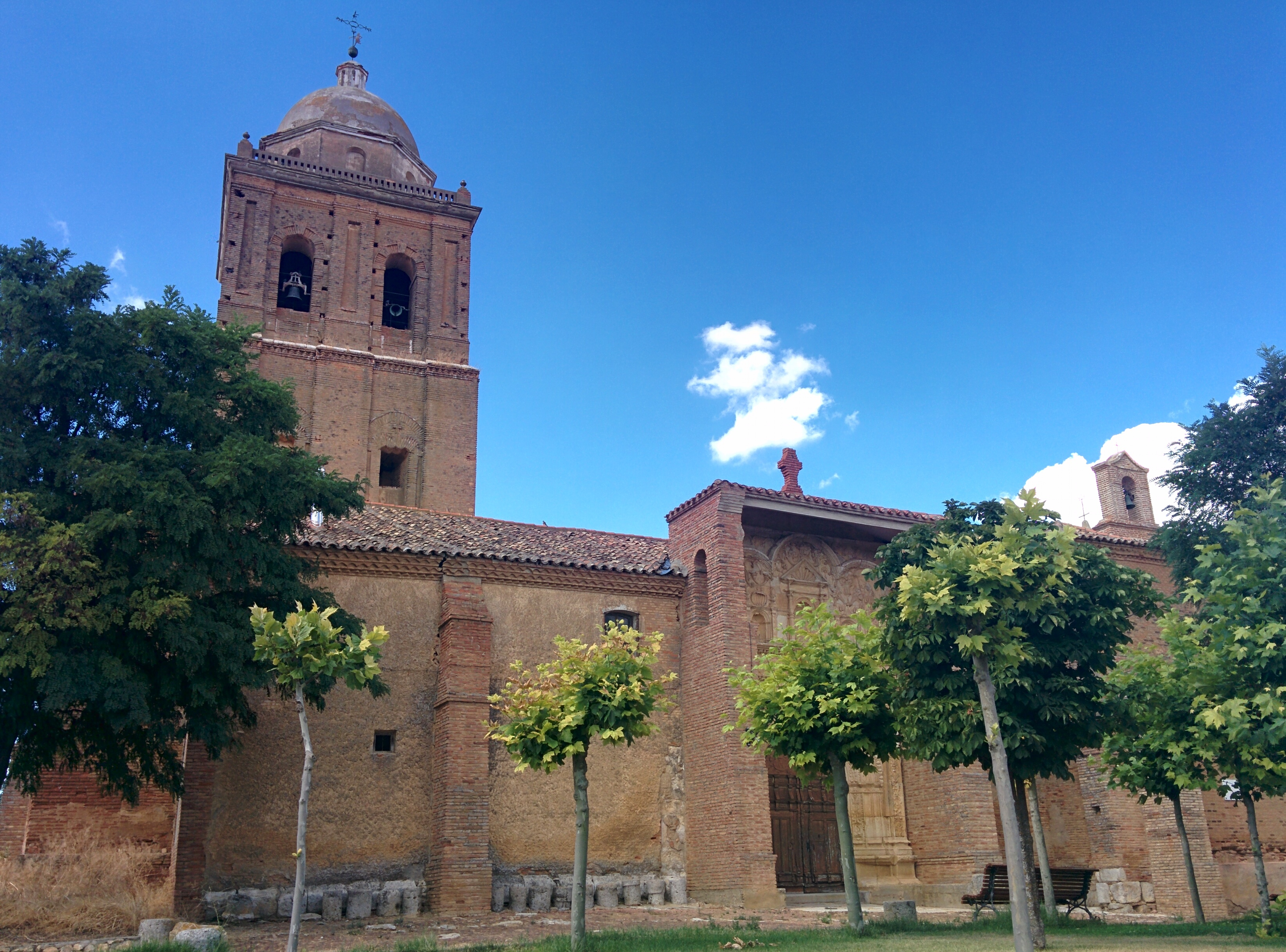
- Interactive map of Mazuecos de Valdeginate
- Country: Spain
- Autonomous community: Castile and León
- Province: Palencia
- Municipality: Mazuecos de Valdeginate

Area
  - Total: 18 km^{2} (6.9 sq mi)

Population (2025-01-01)
  - Total: 78
  - Density: 4.3/km^{2} (11/sq mi)
- Time zone: UTC+1 (CET)
  - Summer (DST): UTC+2 (CEST)
- Website: Official website

Mazuecos de Valdeginate is a municipality located in the province of Palencia, Castile and León, Spain. According to the 2004 census (INE), the municipality has a population of 121 inhabitants.
