= Santervás de la Vega =

Coordinates: 42°30′N 4°48′W

- municipality
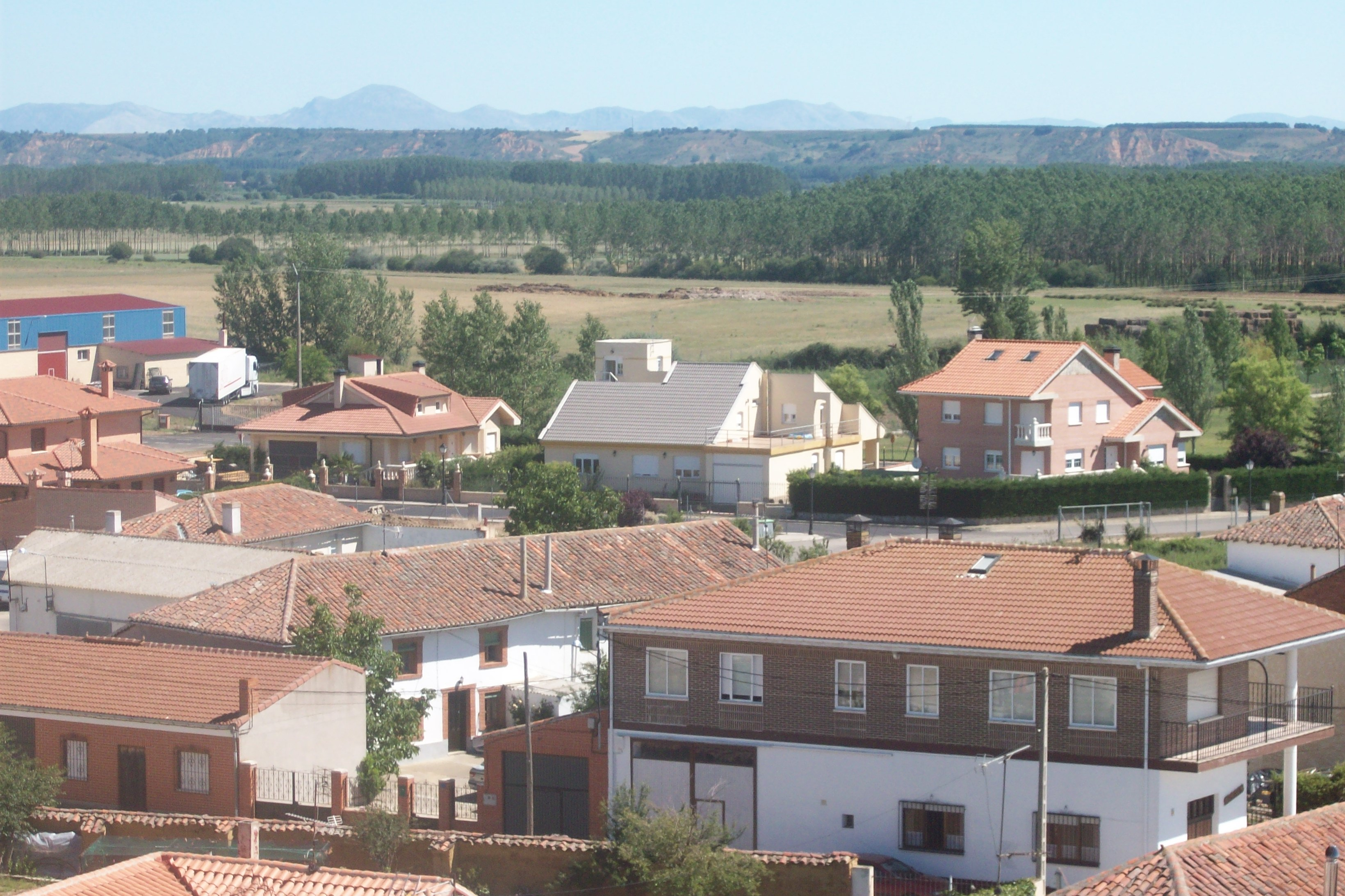

- Flag Coat of arms
- Interactive map of Santervás de la Vega
- Country: Spain
- Autonomous community: Castile and León
- Province: Palencia
- Municipality: Santervás de la Vega

Area
  - Total: 70 km^{2} (27 sq mi)

Population (2025-01-01)
  - Total: 392
  - Density: 5.6/km^{2} (15/sq mi)
- Time zone: UTC+1 (CET)
  - Summer (DST): UTC+2 (CEST)
- Website: Official website

Santervás de la Vega is a municipality located in the province of Palencia, Castile and León, Spain. According to the 2004 census (INE), the municipality has a population of 516 inhabitants.
