= Villodre =

Coordinates: 42°13′N 4°15′W

- municipality
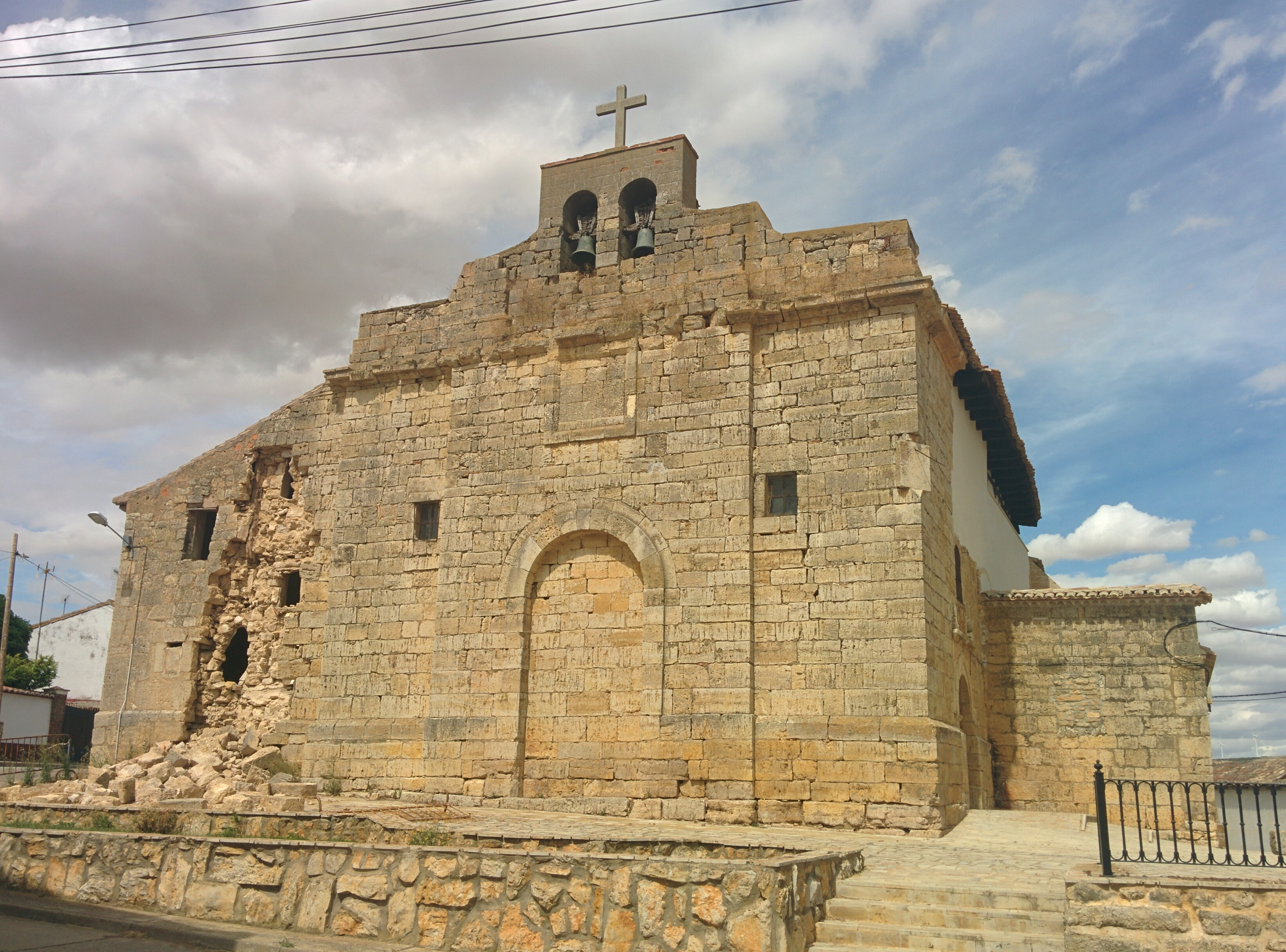
- Interactive map of Villodre
- Country: Spain
- Autonomous community: Castile and León
- Province: Palencia
- Municipality: Villodre

Area
  - Total: 8 km^{2} (3.1 sq mi)

Population (2025-01-01)
  - Total: 22
  - Density: 2.8/km^{2} (7.1/sq mi)
- Time zone: UTC+1 (CET)
  - Summer (DST): UTC+2 (CEST)
- Website: Official website

Villodre is a municipality located in the province of Palencia, Castile and León, Spain. According to the 2022 census (INE), the municipality has a population of 17 inhabitants.
