= Valderrábano =

Coordinates: 42°36′N 4°39′W

- municipality
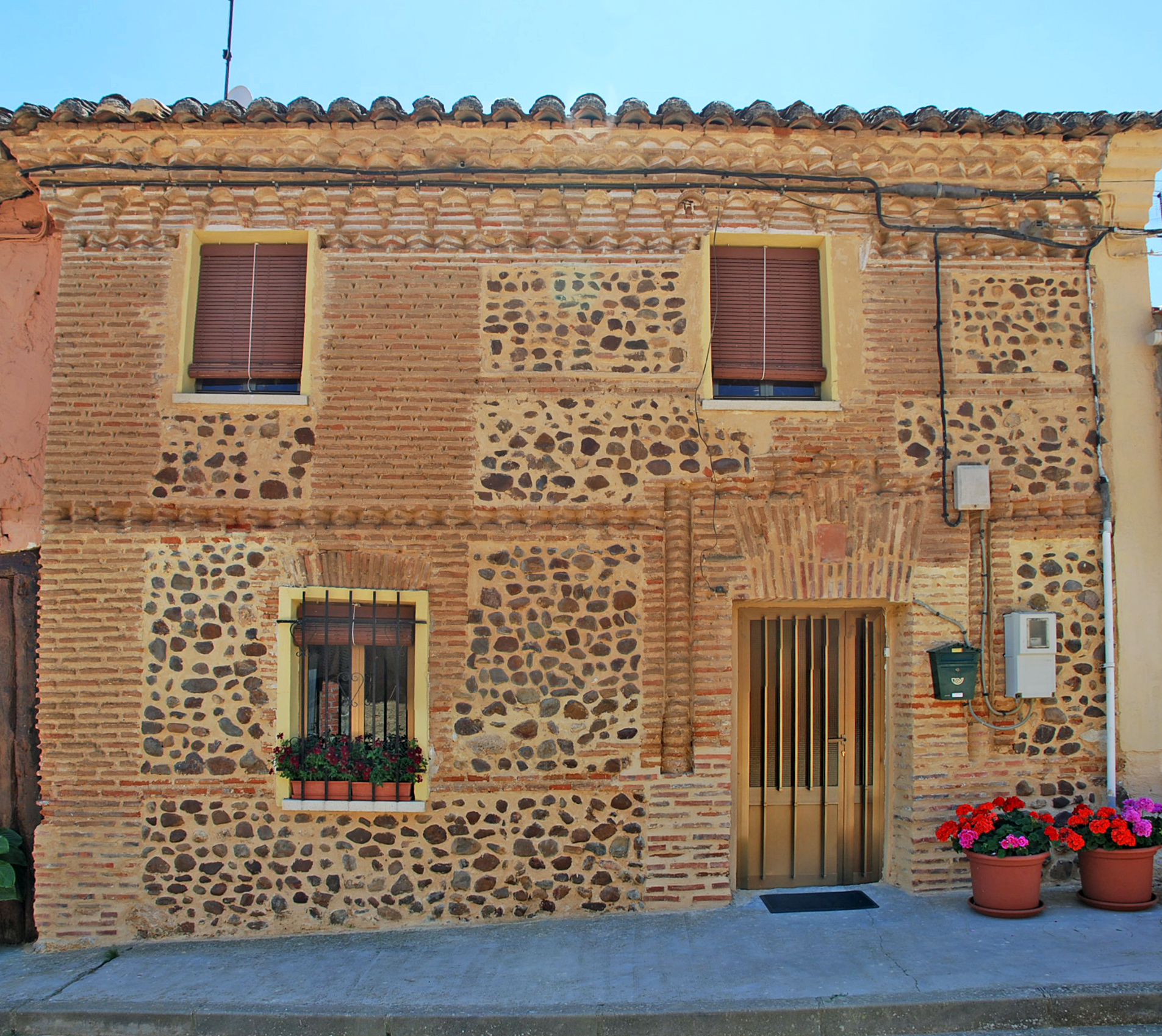
- Interactive map of Valderrábano
- Country: Spain
- Autonomous community: Castile and León
- Province: Palencia
- Municipality: Valderrábano

Area
  - Total: 28 km^{2} (11 sq mi)

Population (2025-01-01)
  - Total: 47
  - Density: 1.7/km^{2} (4.3/sq mi)
- Time zone: UTC+1 (CET)
  - Summer (DST): UTC+2 (CEST)
- Website: Official website

Valderrábano is a municipality located in the province of Palencia, Castile and León, Spain. According to the 2004 census (INE), the municipality has a population of 65 inhabitants.
