= San Román de la Cuba =

- municipality
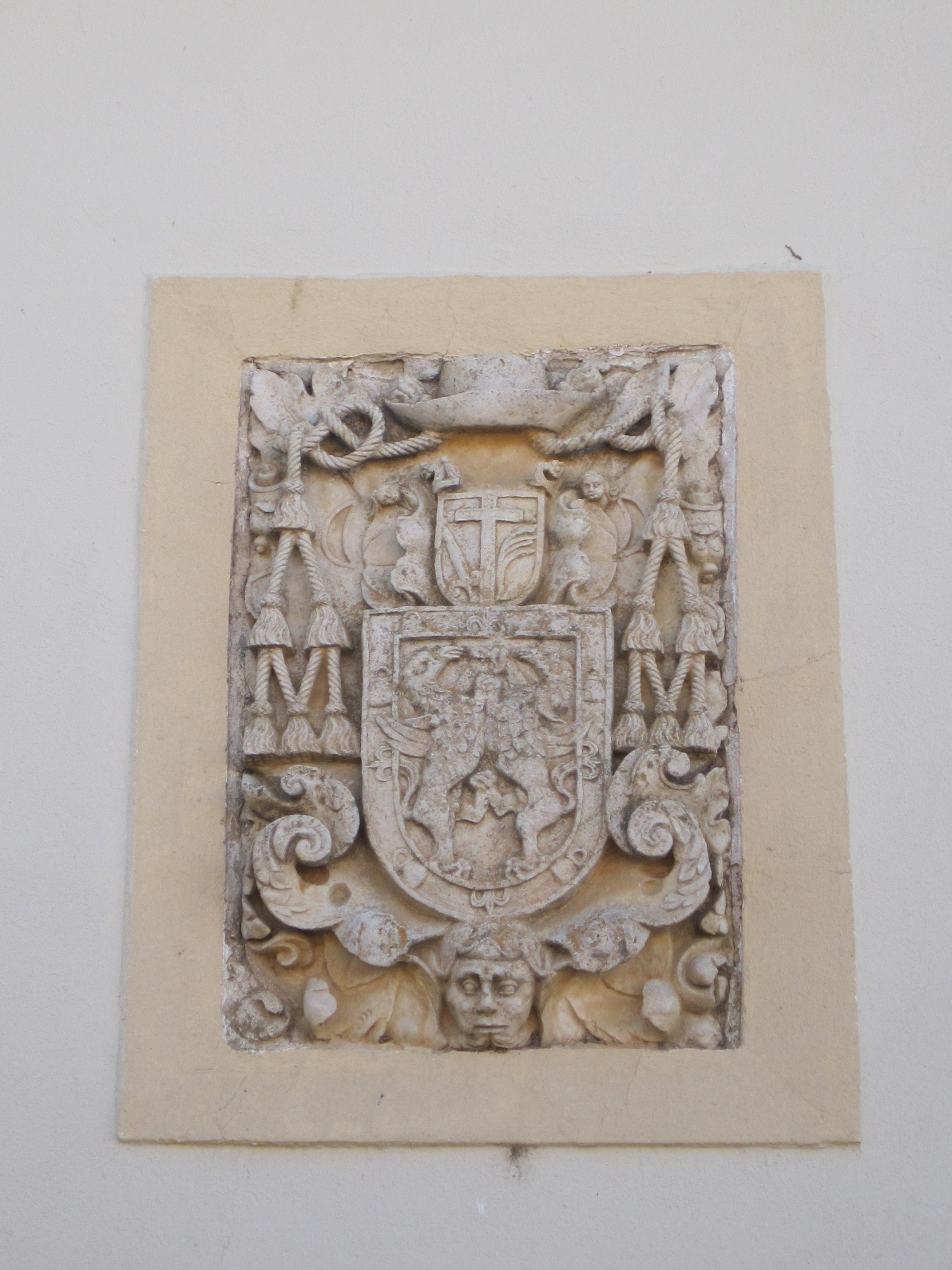
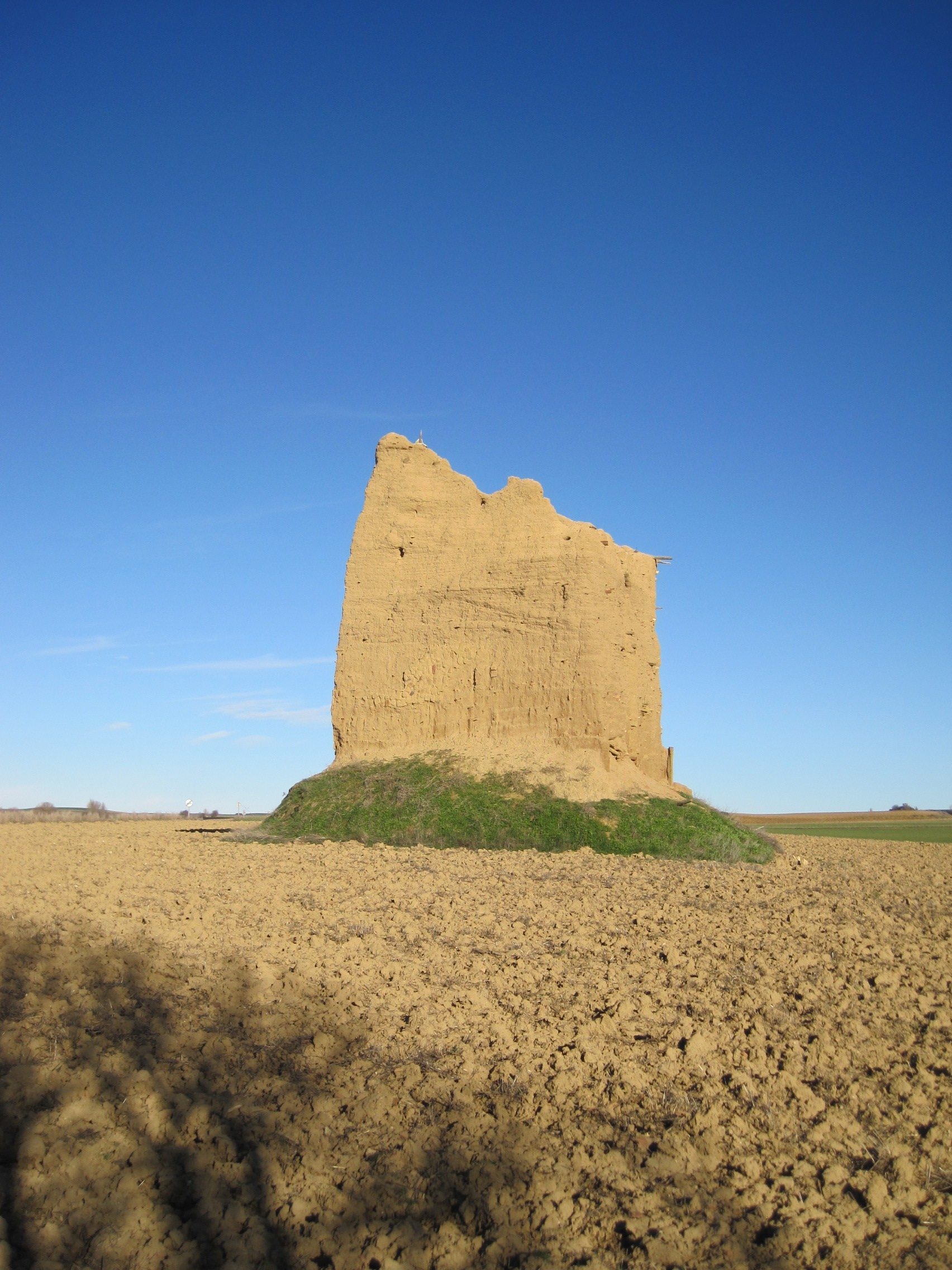
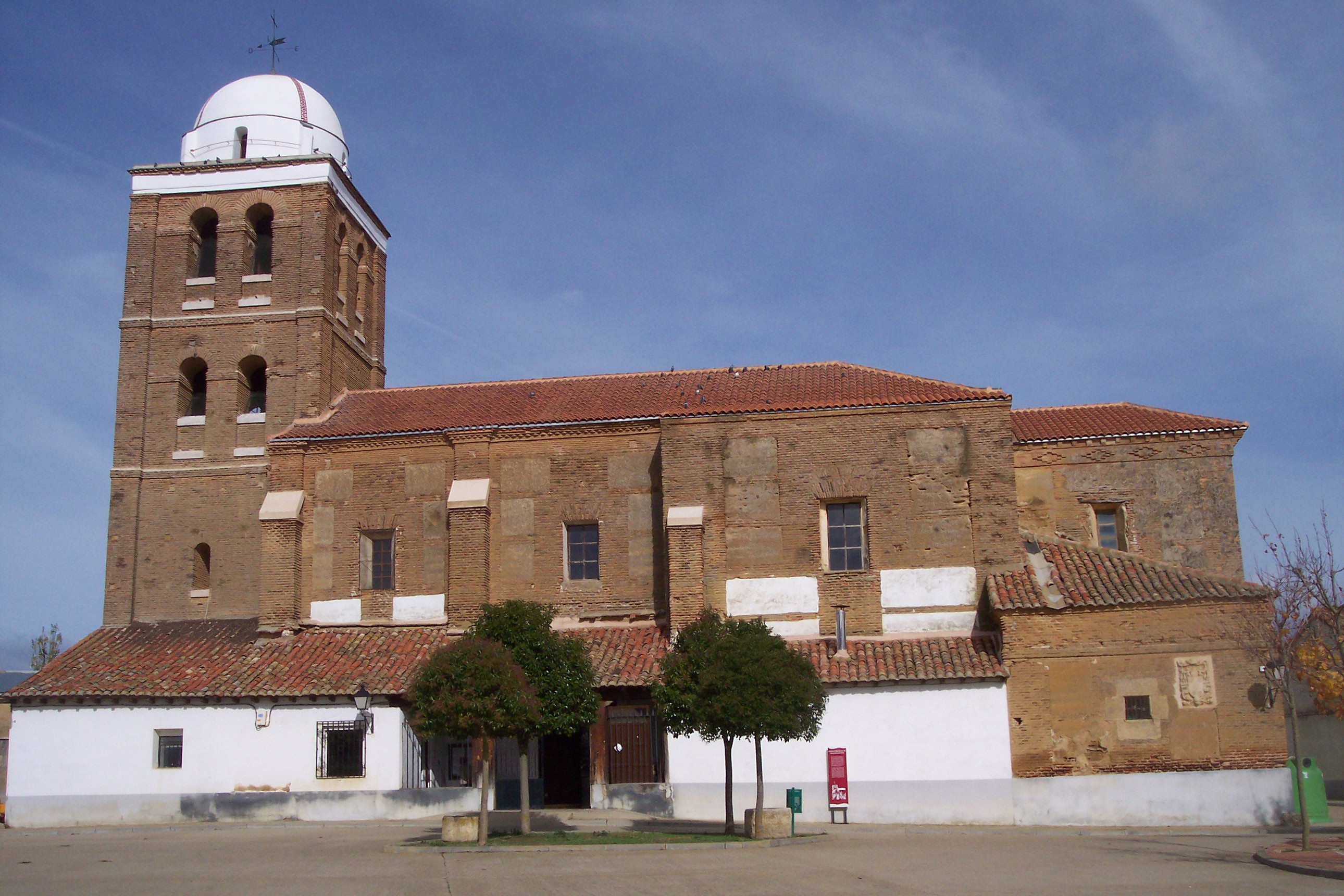
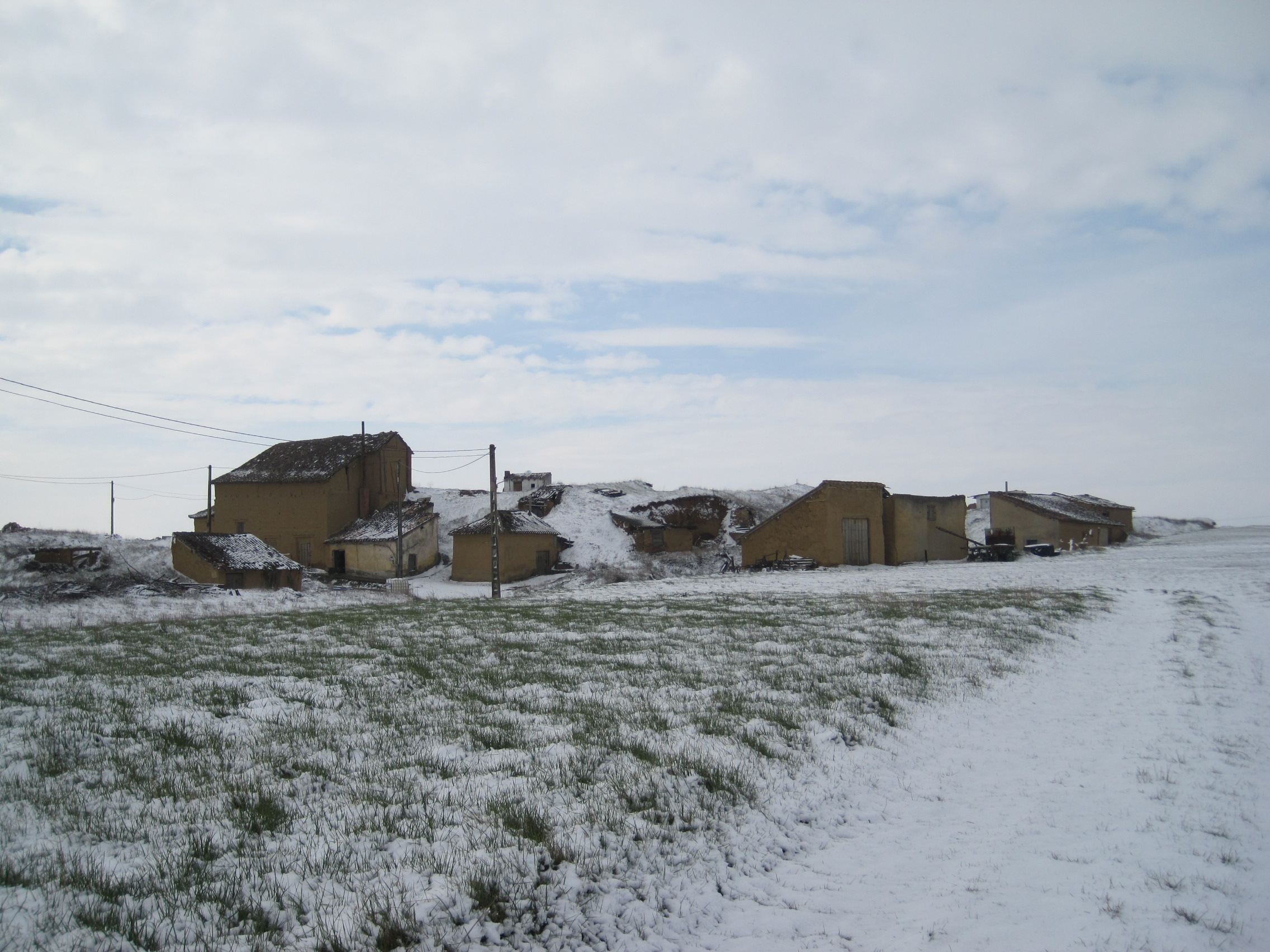
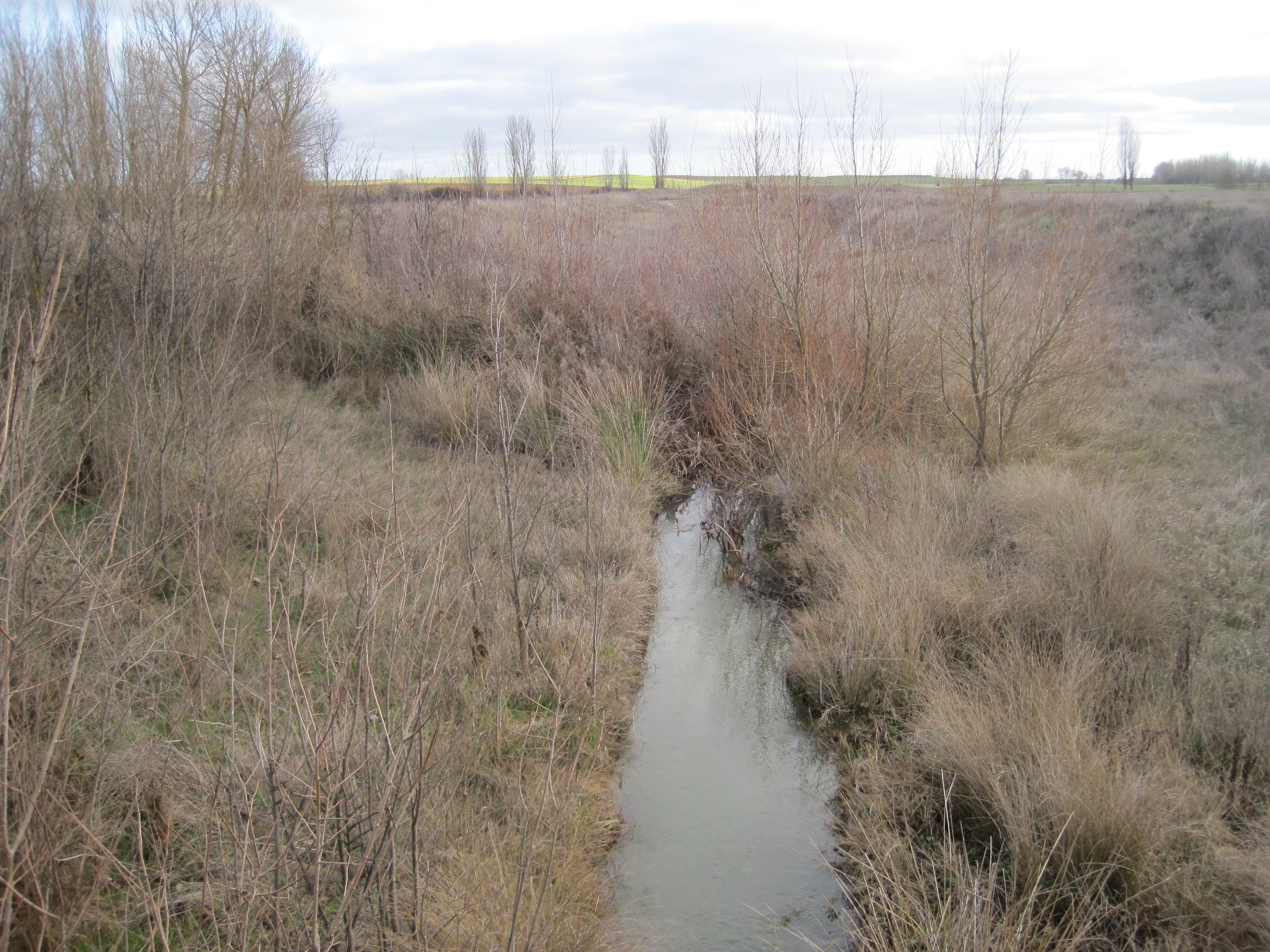

- Flag Coat of arms

- Location within Spain
- Coordinates: 42°15′45″N 4°51′27″W
- Country: Spain
- Autonomous community: Castile and León
- Province: Palencia
- Municipality: San Román de la Cuba

Area
  - Total: 18 km^{2} (6.9 sq mi)

Population (2025-01-01)
  - Total: 53
  - Density: 2.9/km^{2} (7.6/sq mi)
- Time zone: UTC+1 (CET)
  - Summer (DST): UTC+2 (CEST)
- Website: Official website

San Román de la Cuba is a municipality located in the province of Palencia, Castile and León, Spain. According to the 2004 census (INE), the municipality has a population of 108 inhabitants.
