= Villarrabé =

Coordinates: 42°25′16″N 4°47′04″W

- municipality
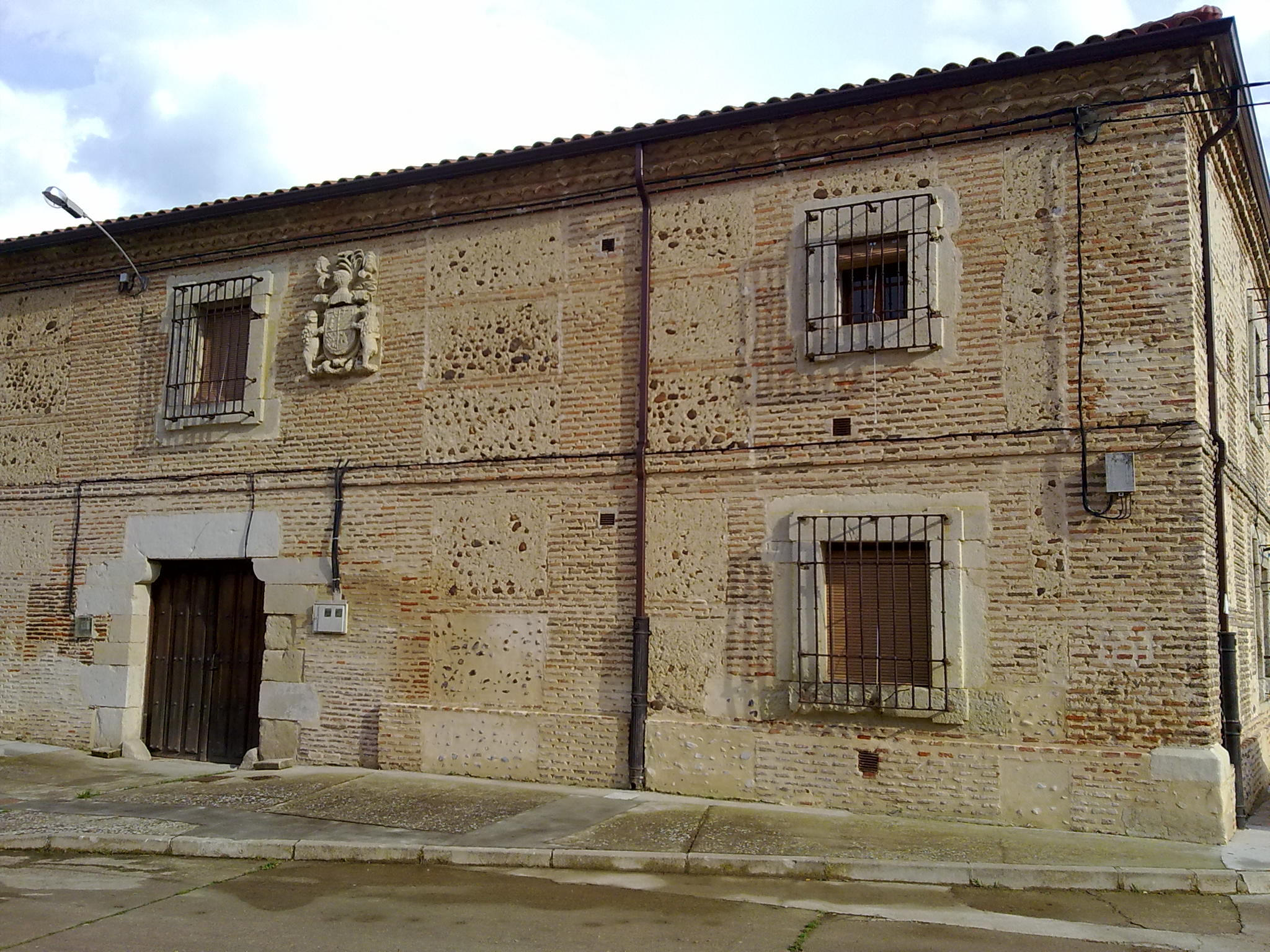
- Interactive map of Villarrabé
- Country: Spain
- Autonomous community: Castile and León
- Province: Palencia
- Municipality: Villarrabé

Area
  - Total: 80 km^{2} (31 sq mi)

Population (2025-01-01)
  - Total: 170
  - Density: 2.1/km^{2} (5.5/sq mi)
- Time zone: UTC+1 (CET)
  - Summer (DST): UTC+2 (CEST)
- Website: Official website

Villarrabé is a municipality located in the province of Palencia, Castile and León, Spain. According to the 2022 census (INE), the municipality has a population of 186 inhabitants.
