= Riberos de la Cueza =

Coordinates: 42°17′N 4°43′W

- municipality
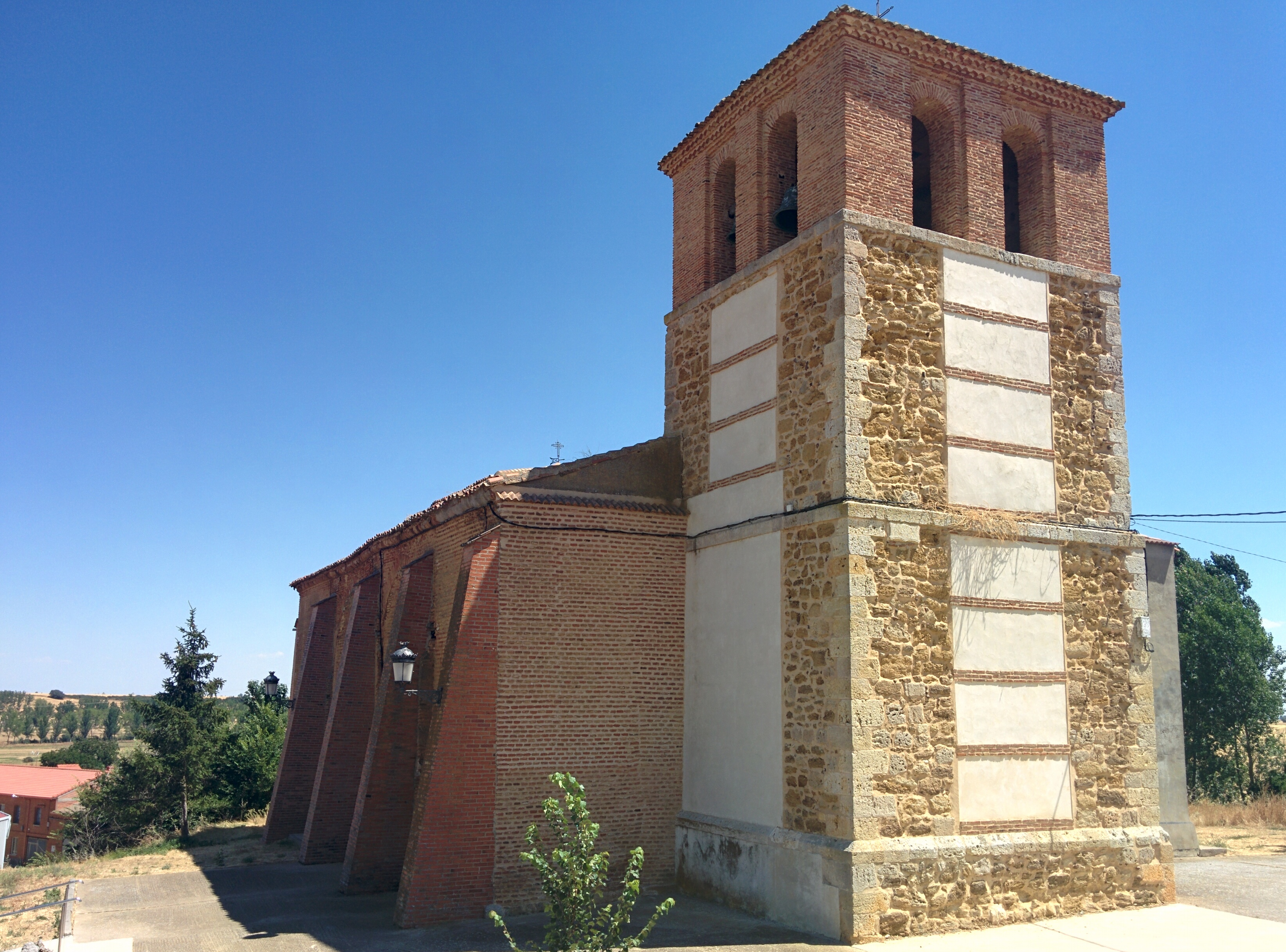
- Interactive map of Riberos de la Cueza
- Country: Spain
- Autonomous community: Castile and León
- Province: Palencia

Area
  - Total: 19 km^{2} (7.3 sq mi)

Population (2025-01-01)
  - Total: 52
  - Density: 2.7/km^{2} (7.1/sq mi)
- Time zone: UTC+1 (CET)
  - Summer (DST): UTC+2 (CEST)
- Website: Official website

Riberos de la Cueza is a municipality located in the province of Palencia, Castile and León, Spain. According to the 2004 census (INE), the municipality has a population of 87.
