= Amayuelas de Arriba =

Coordinates: 42°13′N 4°29′W

- municipality
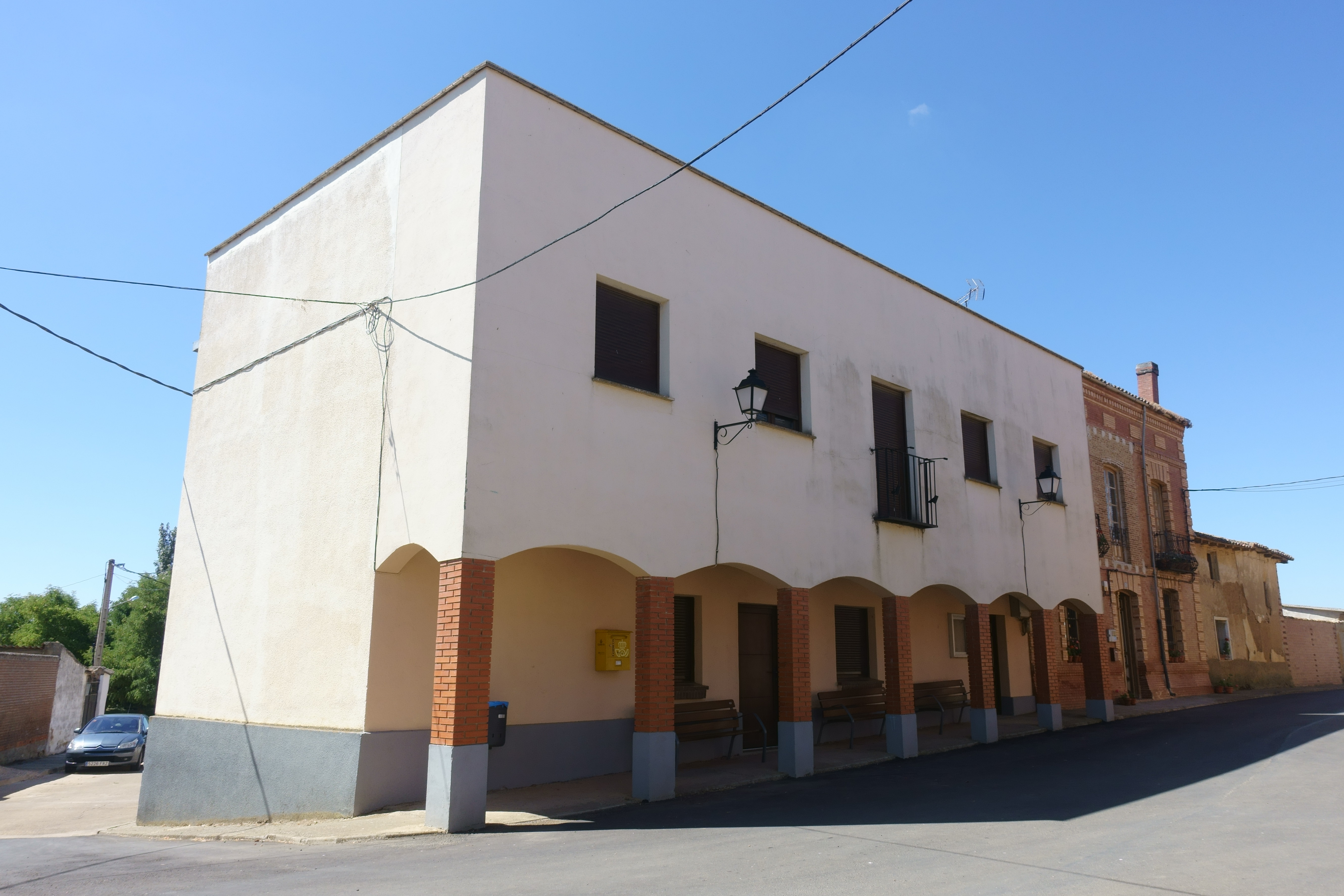
- Town hall
- Interactive map of Amayuelas de Arriba
- Country: Spain
- Autonomous community: Castile and León
- Province: Palencia

Area
  - Total: 10.17 km^{2} (3.93 sq mi)
- Elevation: 782 m (2,566 ft)

Population (2025-01-01)
  - Total: 36
  - Density: 3.5/km^{2} (9.2/sq mi)
- Time zone: UTC+1 (CET)
  - Summer (DST): UTC+2 (CEST)
- Website: Official website

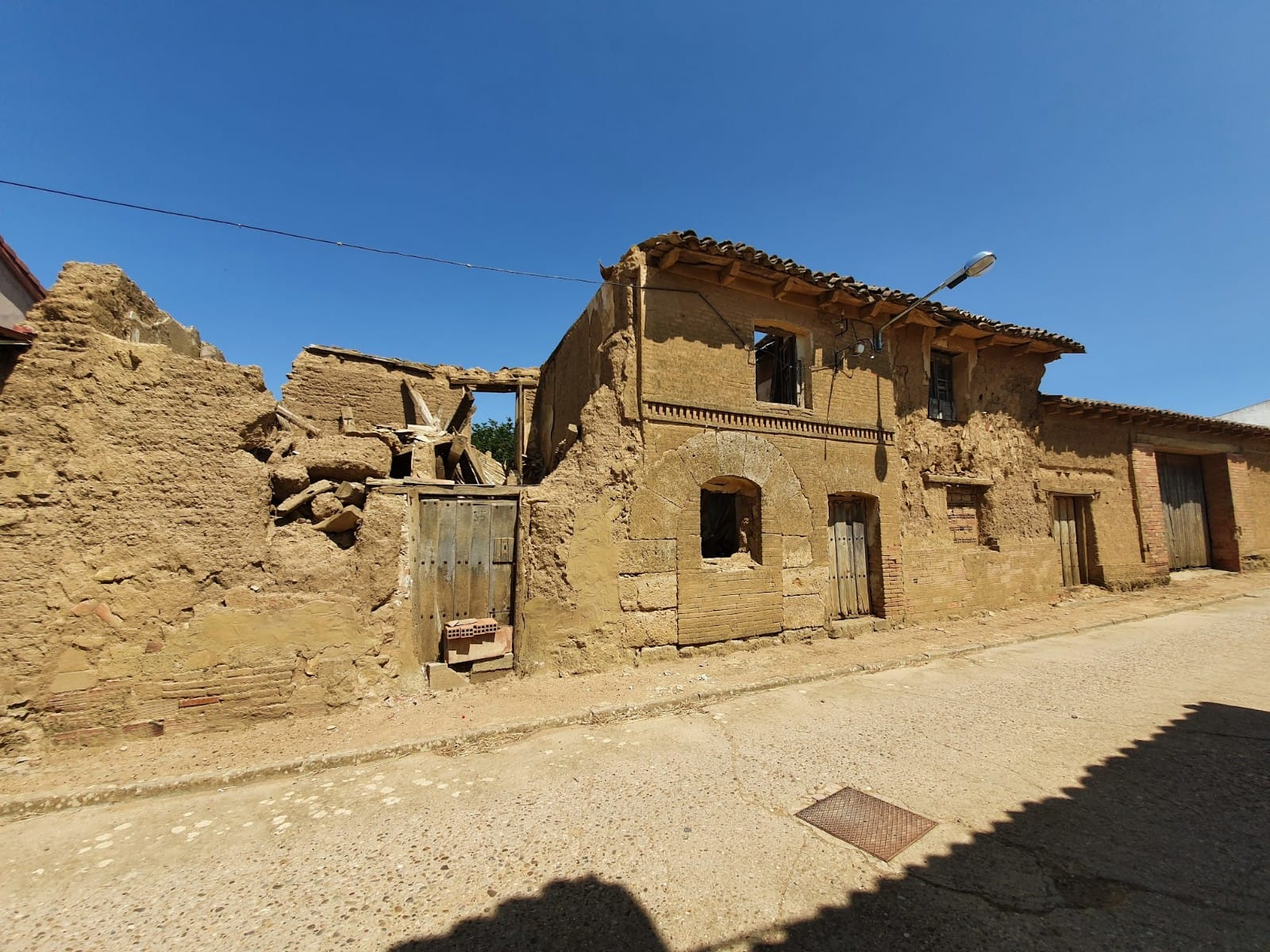
View of Amayuelas de Arriba.

Amayuelas de Arriba is a municipality located in the province of Palencia, Castile and León, Spain. According to the 2004 census (INE), the municipality had a population of 38 inhabitants.
