= Renedo de la Vega =

Coordinates: 42°27′N 4°42′W

- municipality
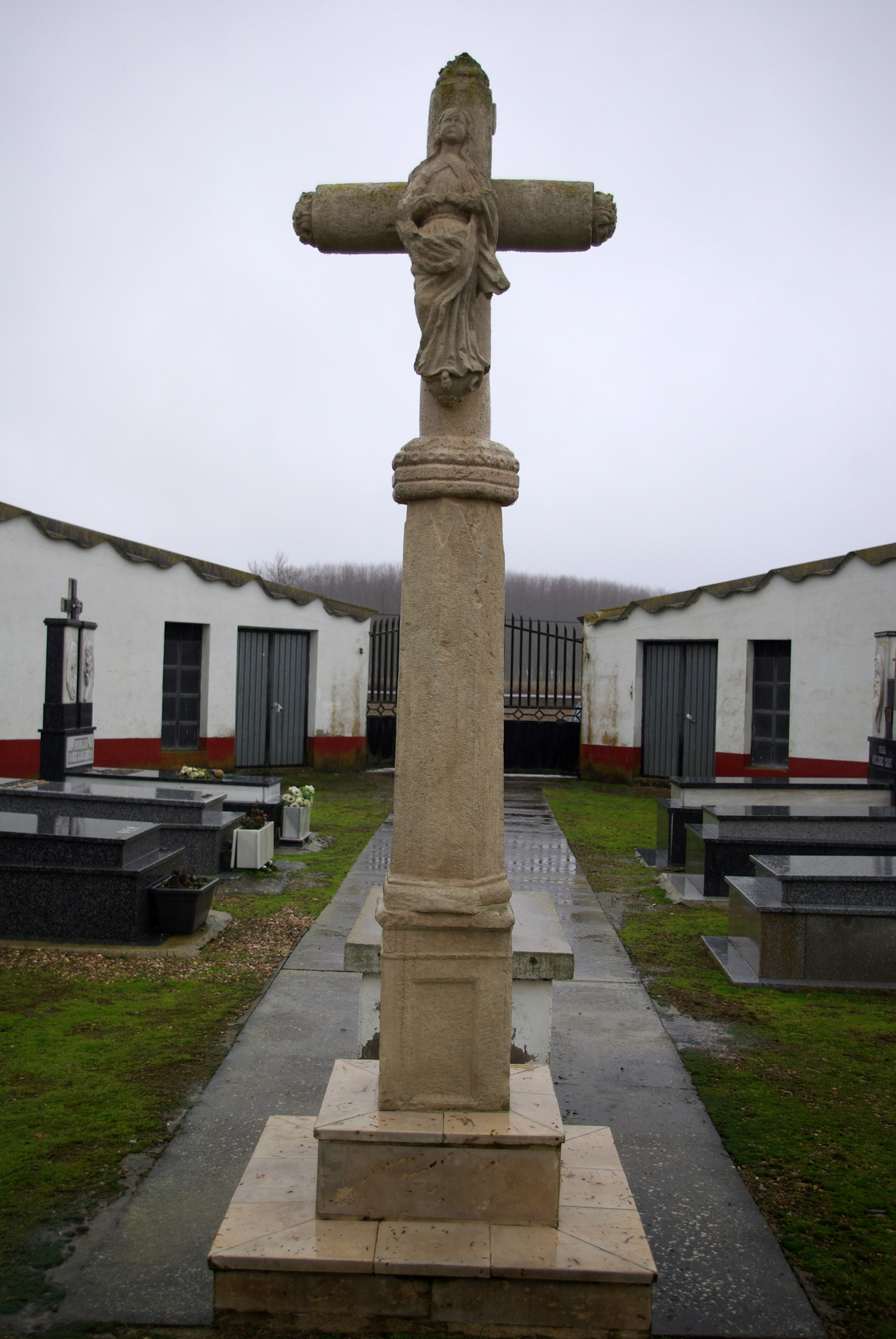

- Flag Coat of arms
- Interactive map of Renedo de la Vega
- Country: Spain
- Autonomous community: Castile and León
- Province: Palencia

Area
  - Total: 22 km^{2} (8.5 sq mi)

Population (2025-01-01)
  - Total: 193
  - Density: 8.8/km^{2} (23/sq mi)
- Time zone: UTC+1 (CET)
  - Summer (DST): UTC+2 (CEST)
- Website: Official website

Renedo de la Vega is a municipality located in the province of Palencia, Castile and León, Spain. According to the 2004 census (INE), the municipality has a population of 256 inhabitants.
