= Polentinos =

Coordinates: 42°56′N 4°31′W

- municipality
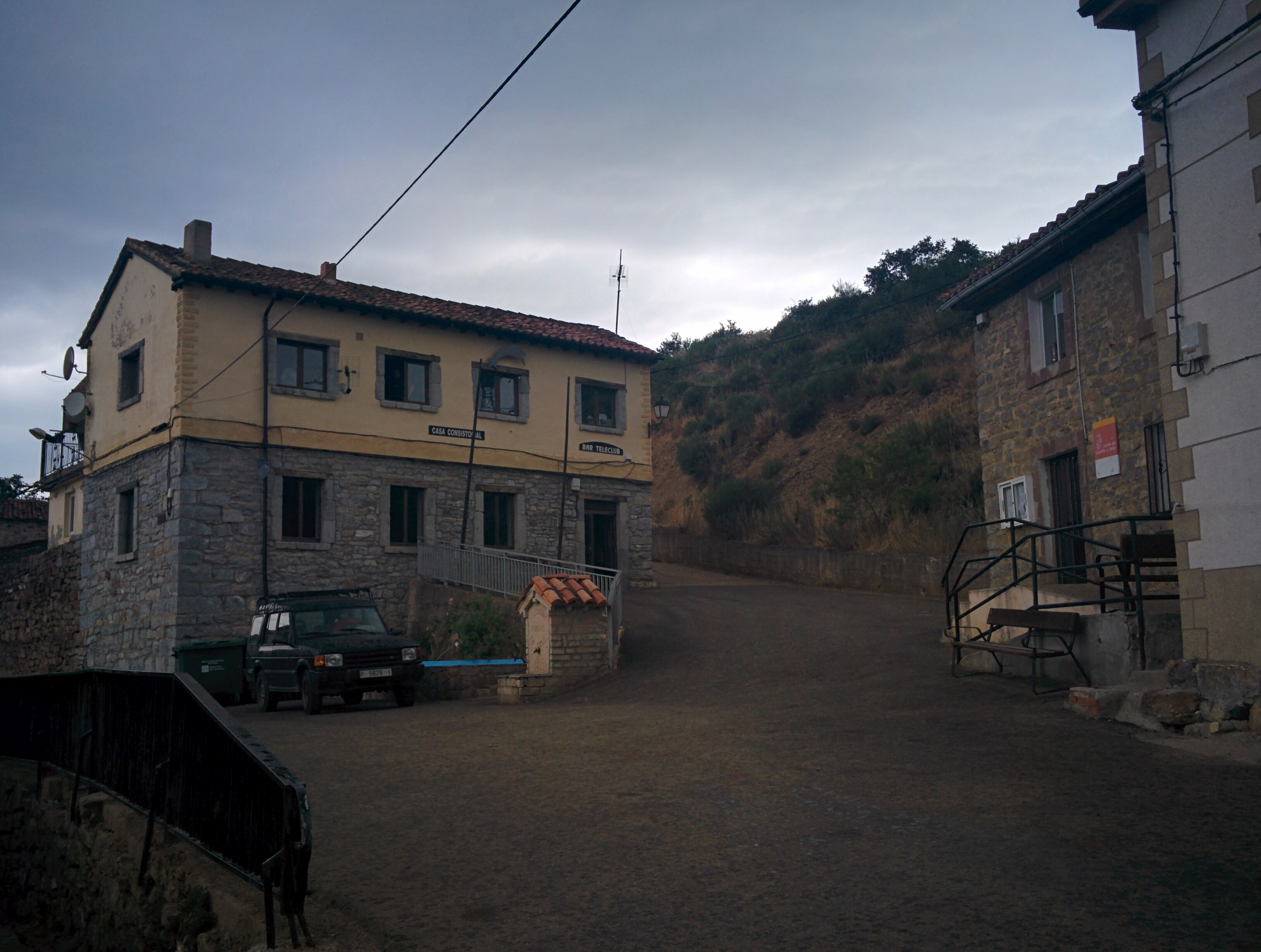
- Interactive map of Polentinos
- Country: Spain
- Autonomous community: Castile and León
- Province: Palencia

Area
  - Total: 14 km^{2} (5.4 sq mi)

Population (2025-01-01)
  - Total: 41
  - Density: 2.9/km^{2} (7.6/sq mi)
- Time zone: UTC+1 (CET)
  - Summer (DST): UTC+2 (CEST)
- Website: Official website

Polentinos [polenˈtinos] is a municipality located in the province of Palencia, Castile and León, Spain. According to the 2004 census (INE), the municipality has a population of 78 inhabitants.
