= Pozo de Urama =

Coordinates: 42°15′N 4°53′W

- municipality
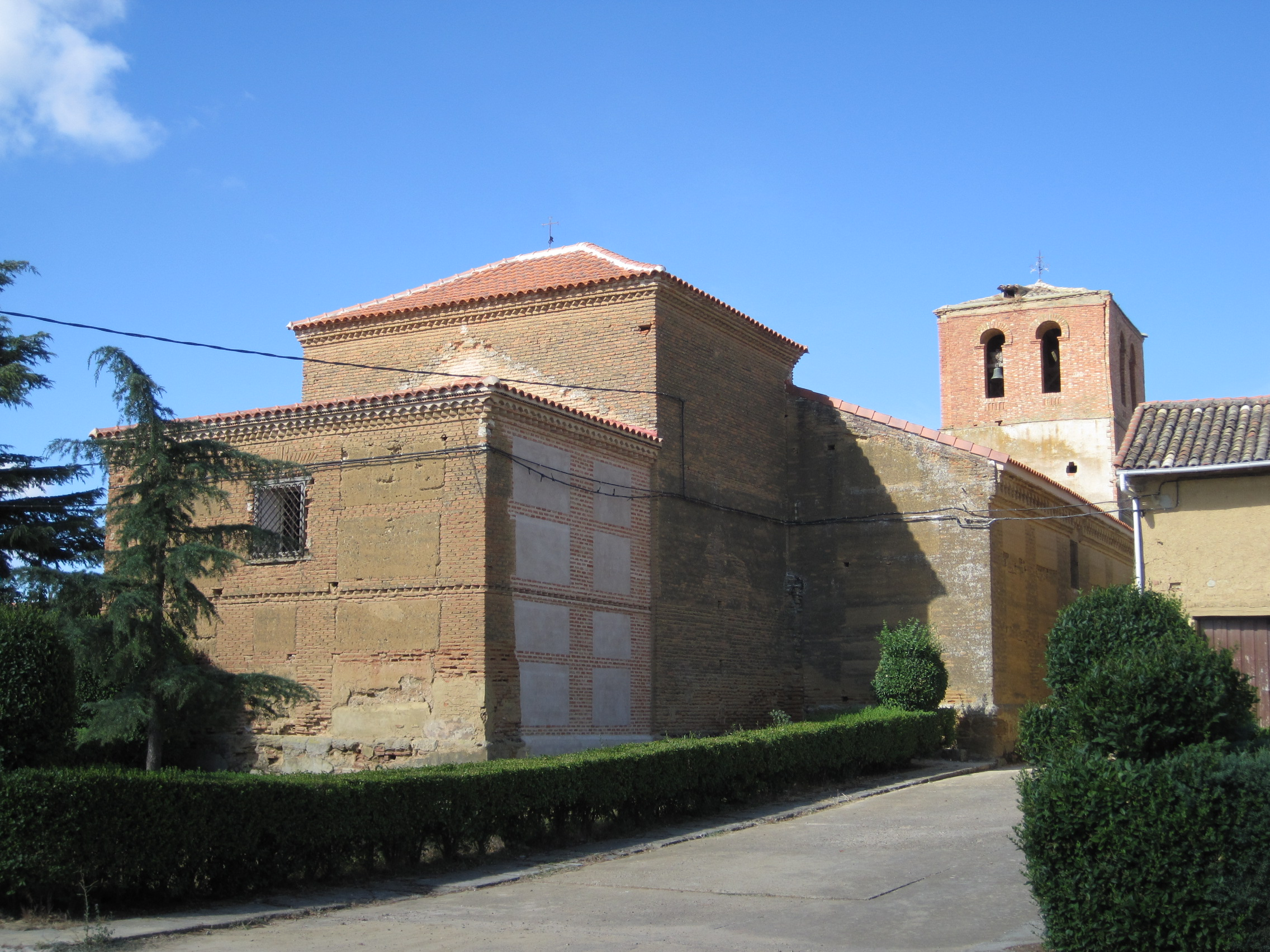

- Flag Coat of arms
- Interactive map of Pozo de Urama
- Country: Spain
- Autonomous community: Castile and León
- Province: Palencia

Area
  - Total: 13 km^{2} (5.0 sq mi)

Population (2025-01-01)
  - Total: 21
  - Density: 1.6/km^{2} (4.2/sq mi)
- Time zone: UTC+1 (CET)
  - Summer (DST): UTC+2 (CEST)
- Website: Official website

Pozo de Urama is a municipality located in the province of Palencia, Castile and León, Spain. According to the 2004 census (INE), the municipality has a population of 44 inhabitants.
