= El Cerrato =

Coordinates: 41°58′13″N 4°17′49″W

The comarca of Cerrato in the province of Palencia.

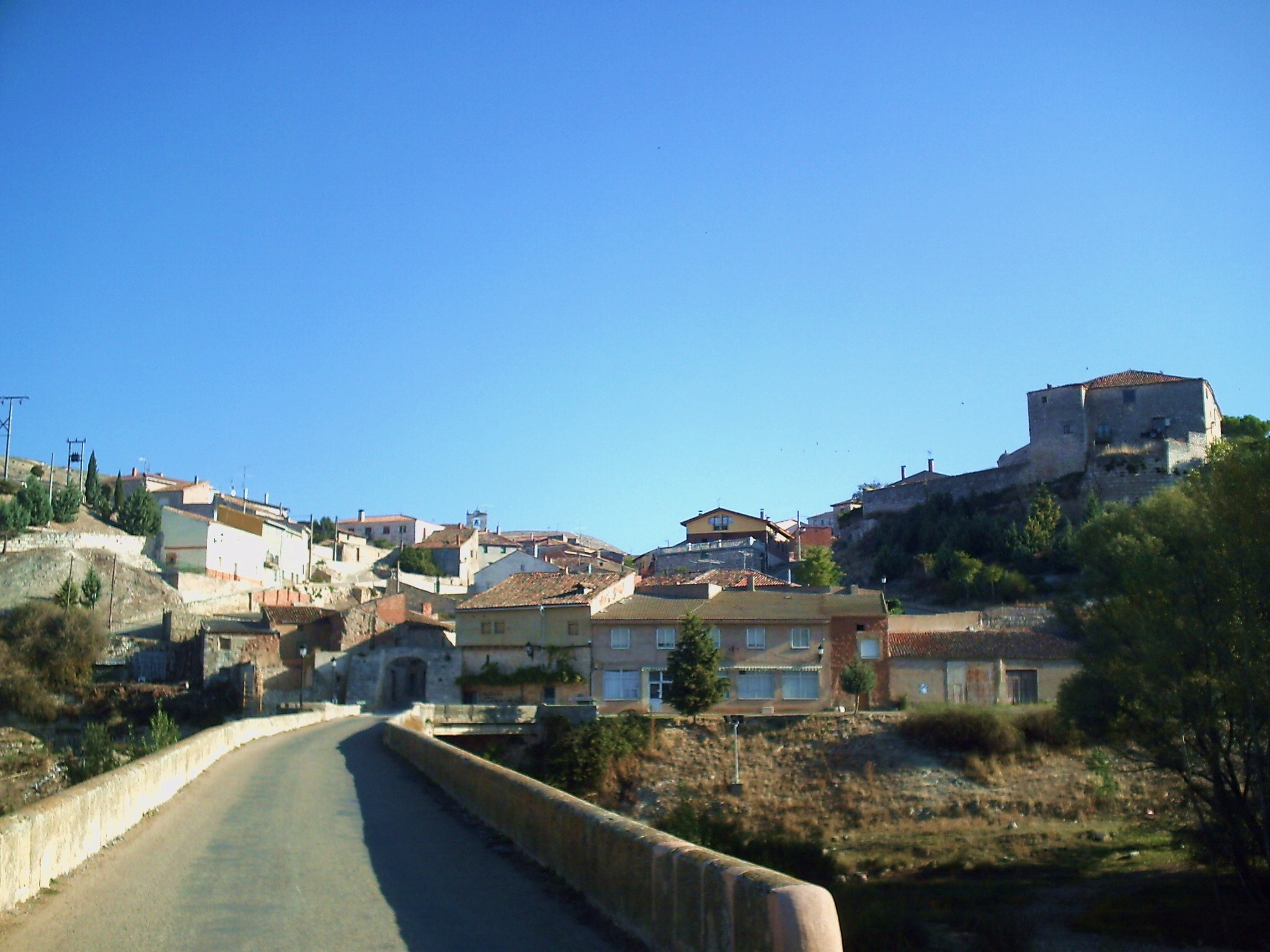
Palenzuela. Roman Bridge on the Arlanza river. In the background, "Puerta de la Paz".

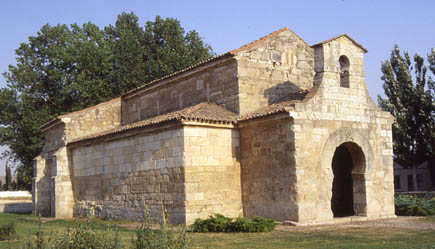
San Juan de Baños Basilica, considered the oldest standing church in Spain.

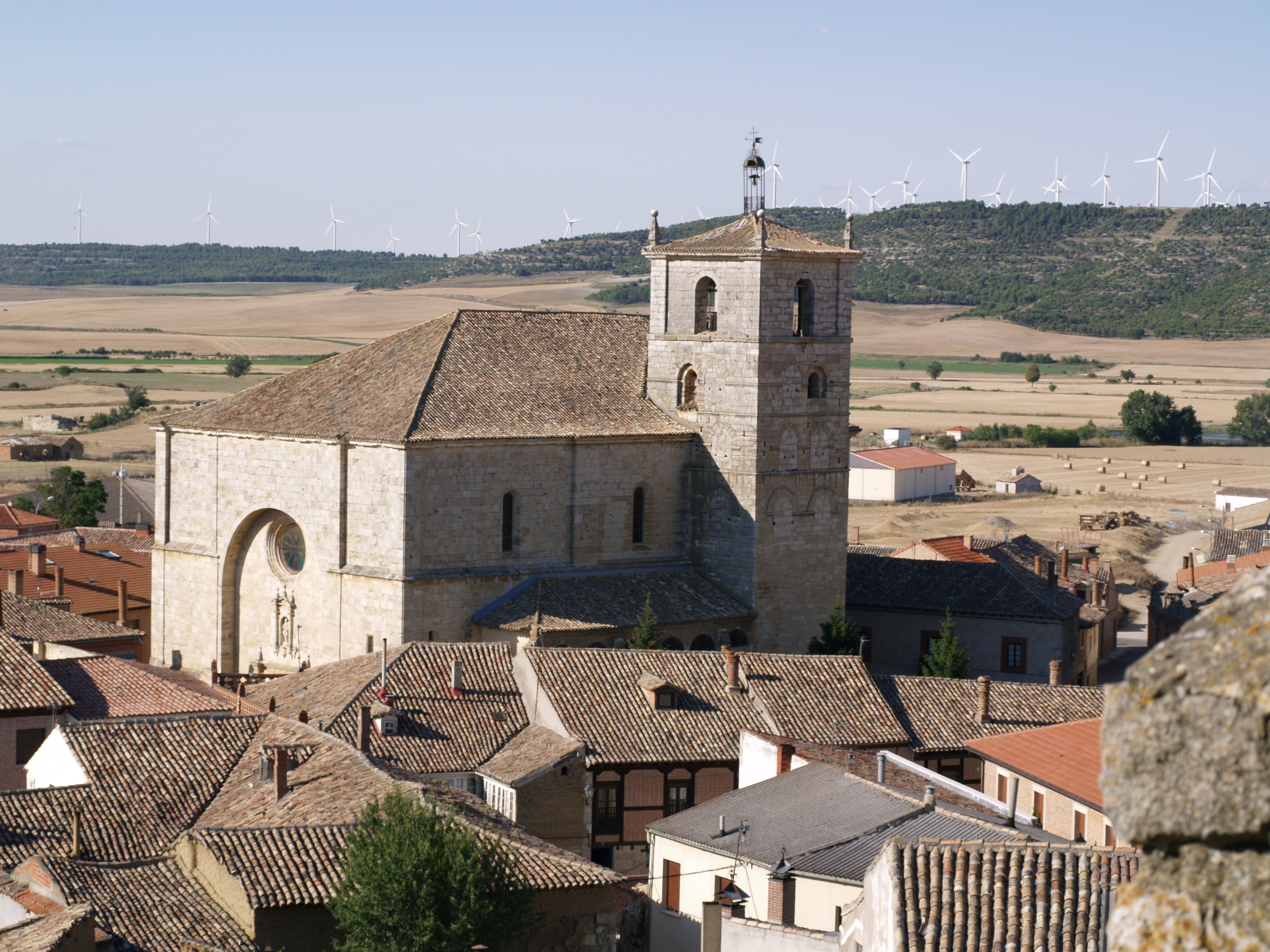
The village of Astudillo, with the Santa Eugenia church.

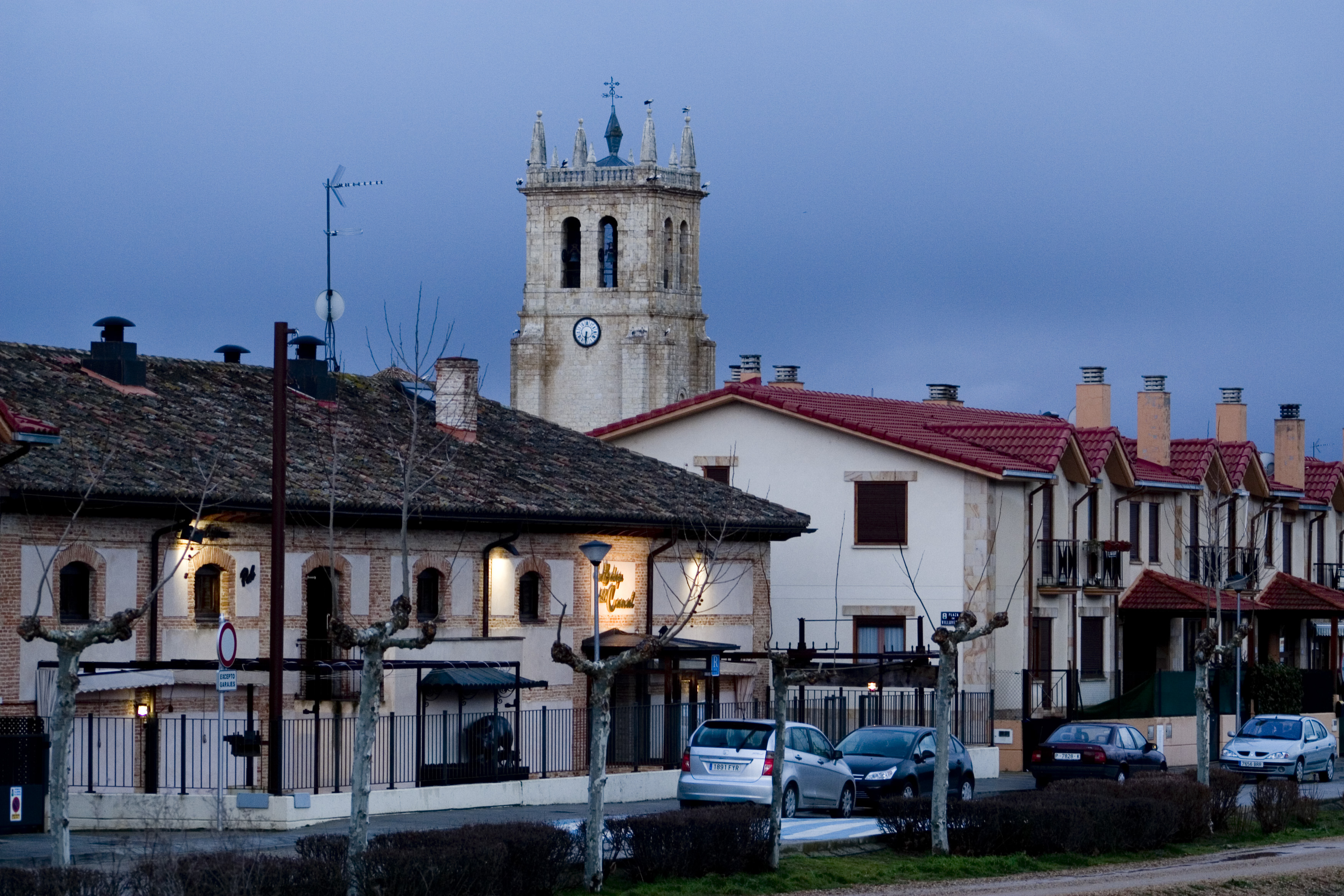
Villamuriel de Cerrato is one of the fastest growing towns in the region in terms of demographic and urban development.

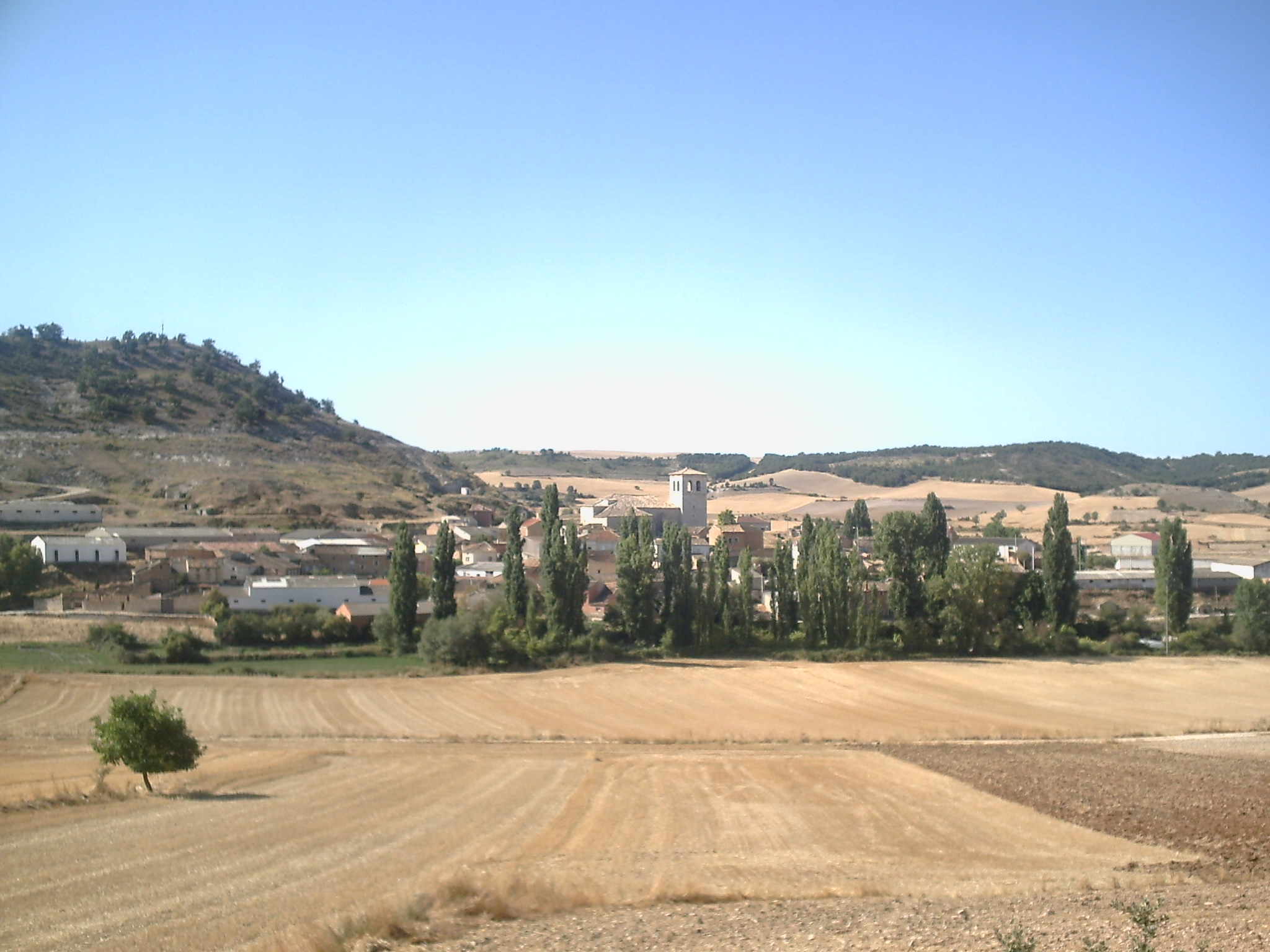
View of Valdecañas de Cerrato, town where the movie "Las Ratas" was filmed, based on the novel by Miguel Delibes.

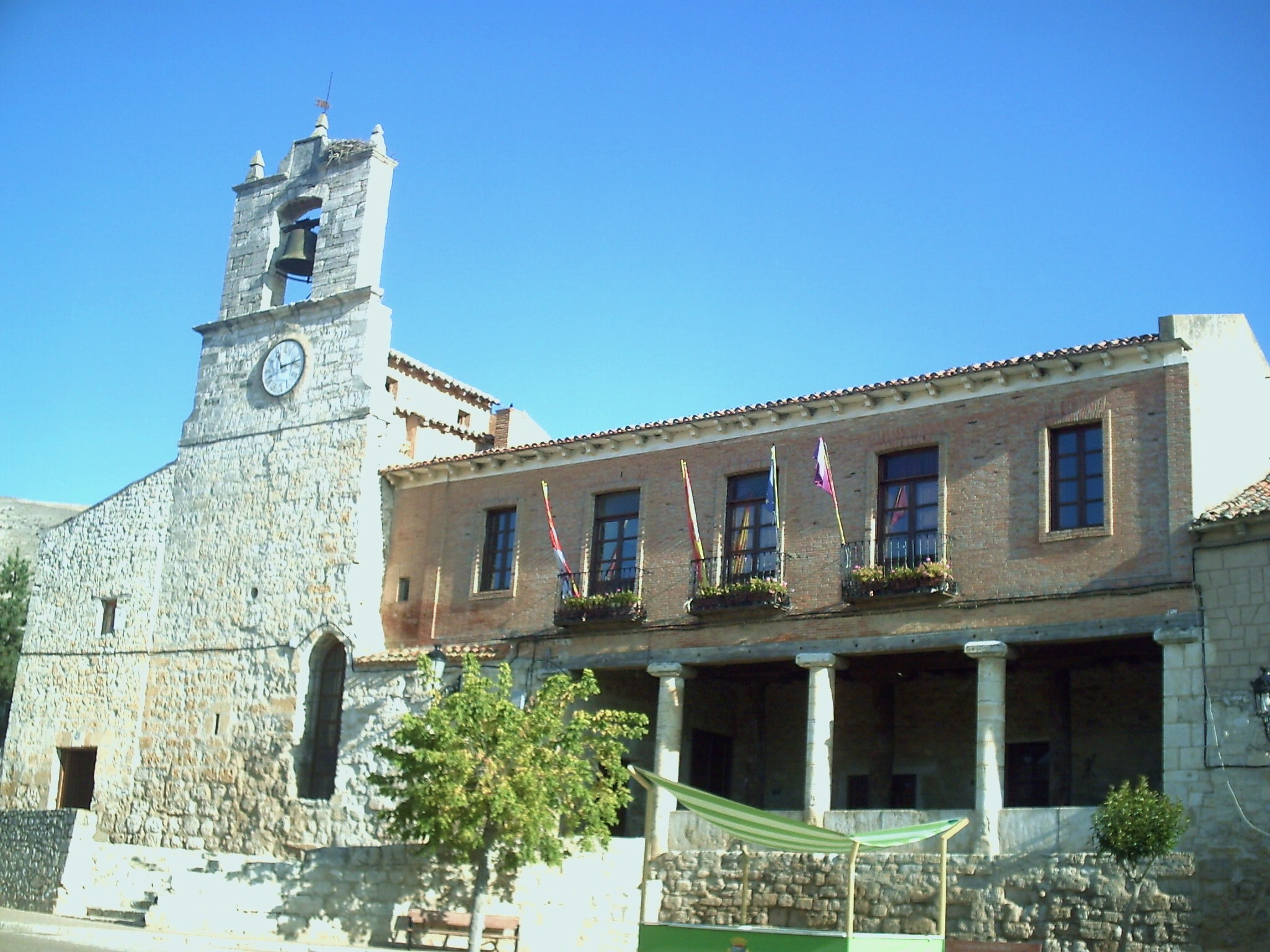
Palenzuela city hall.

El Cerrato is a natural comarca in Spain comprising locations in the provinces of Palencia, Burgos and Valladolid, although the largest part lies within Palencia. With an area of 1,534 km^{2}, almost 25,000 inhabitants and an average elevation of 783 meters above sea level, the region contains 37 villages and the city of Dueñas. Its capitals throughout history have been Castroverde de Cerrato, Palenzuela and, from the late fifteenth century, Baltanás, the largest municipality.

== Etymology ==
Some sources say that the name comes from the Latin cirratus, which gave the Romance zerrato, with the meaning of "land dominated by rolling hills or cerrales". Other sources say it comes from the Latin serrare, in the sense of an area that is enclosed, fenced or cordoned off (cerrado).

== Geography ==
=== Fauna ===
In the moors there are hares (leporidae), rabbits (oryctolagus cuniculus), partridges (phasianidae) and turtle doves (columbina). Along the river channels there is the presence of herons (nycticorax nycticorax), otters (lutra lutra), the Pyrenean desman (galemys pyrenaicus), while in the moors are found the Great Bustard (otis tarda), Little Bustard (tetrax tetrax) and montagu's harrier (circus pygargus), a species listed in the Catálogo Nacional de Especies Amenazadas or "National Catalogue of Endangered Species" (Royal Decree 439/1990, of 30 March).

== Boundaries of the Comarca ==
El Cerrato is bounded:

- to the north by the natural comarcas of Tierra de Campos (Palencia) and Castrojeriz (Province of Burgos).
- to the south by the provincial boundary of Palencia.
- to the east by the provincial boundary of Palencia. In the provinces of Valladolid and Burgos it borders the comarcas of Peñafiel, Spain, Los Pinares and Ribera del Duero.
- to the west by the natural comarcas of Tierra de Campos (Palencia) and the Torozos Mountains and the Pisuerga river (Province of Valladolid).

== Climate ==
The region has a temperate-cold continental climate with a dry season. The following characteristics are noted:

- Annual rainfall varies between 400 and 500 ml of rain.
- The days of rainfall exceed 100 per year.
- The average annual temperature is between 11 and 12 °C.
- The difference between the average temperature of the warmest and the coldest months is about 18 °C.
- In winter the average temperatures are below 6 °C.
- There is a lot of (November through April).
- Summer is the dry season with high temperatures and water shortages.

== Landscape ==
This natural area consists of a maze of valleys and natural nooks that rise up suddenly. The old dwellings retain some of their individual traditional architecture and lifestyle.

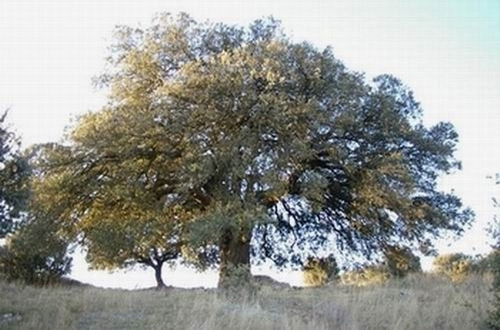
The centenarian oak.

== Flora ==
As for vegetation, the indigenous forest is Mediterranean in nature, made up of oak and holm, adapted to the climate and soil. Despite the dryness of the comarca there are forests on the banks of rivers and streams. There are trees such as poplar, willow and common elm, although the latter is slowly disappearing because of Dutch elm disease.

The grass on the slopes have been used for grazing since ancient times but lately grazing has been so intense that it has left the soil bare and exposed to erosion so foresters have resorted to planting pine.

The comarca has juniper, most notably those in San Juan de Castellanos, in Cobos de Cerrato, one of the best preserved in Castile y León.

== Natura 2000 ==
In the region there are the areas included in the Natura 2000: SPA ES0000220 "Banks of the Pisuerga" LIC ES4120082 Pisuerga riverbanks and tributaries LIC ES4120071 Arlanza riverbanks and tributaries LIC ES4120072 Arlanzón riverbanks and tributaries LIC ES4140053 Cerrato Mountains and LIC ES4140129 the Torozos and Paramo de Torquemada-Astudillo Mountains. Other areas with different degrees of protection present are IBA no.42 Pisuerga River in Dueñas and IBA no.044 Cerrato Deserts.

== Municipalities ==
Nuestra Señora de la Asunción Church in Castroverde de Cerrato.

- Alba de Cerrato
- Antigüedad
- Astudillo
- Baltanás
- Castrillo de Don Juan
- Castrillo de Onielo
- Castroverde de Cerrato
- Cevico de la Torre
- Cevico Navero
- Cobos de Cerrato
- Cordovilla la Real
- Cubillas de Cerrato
- Dueñas
- Espinosa de Cerrato
- Hérmedes de Cerrato
- Herrera de Valdecañas
- Hontoria de Cerrato
- Hornillos de Cerrato
- Magaz de Pisuerga
- Melgar de Yuso
- Palenzuela
- Población de Cerrato
- Quintana del Puente
- Reinoso de Cerrato
- Soto de Cerrato
- Tabanera de Cerrato
- Tariego de Cerrato
- Torquemada
- Valbuena de Pisuerga
- Valdeolmillos
- Valle de Cerrato
- Venta de Baños
- Vertavillo
- Villaconancio
- Villahán
- Villalaco
- Villamediana
- Villamuriel de Cerrato
- Villaviudas
- Villodre
- Villodrigo

== Bibliography ==
- Vallejo del Busto, Manuel. El Cerrato Castellano. Diputación Provincial de Palencia, 1987. ISBN 9788450563474
- Alcalde Crespo, Gonzalo. El Cerrato palentino. Palencia: Cálamo, 1997
