= Valdecañas de Cerrato =

- Town and district
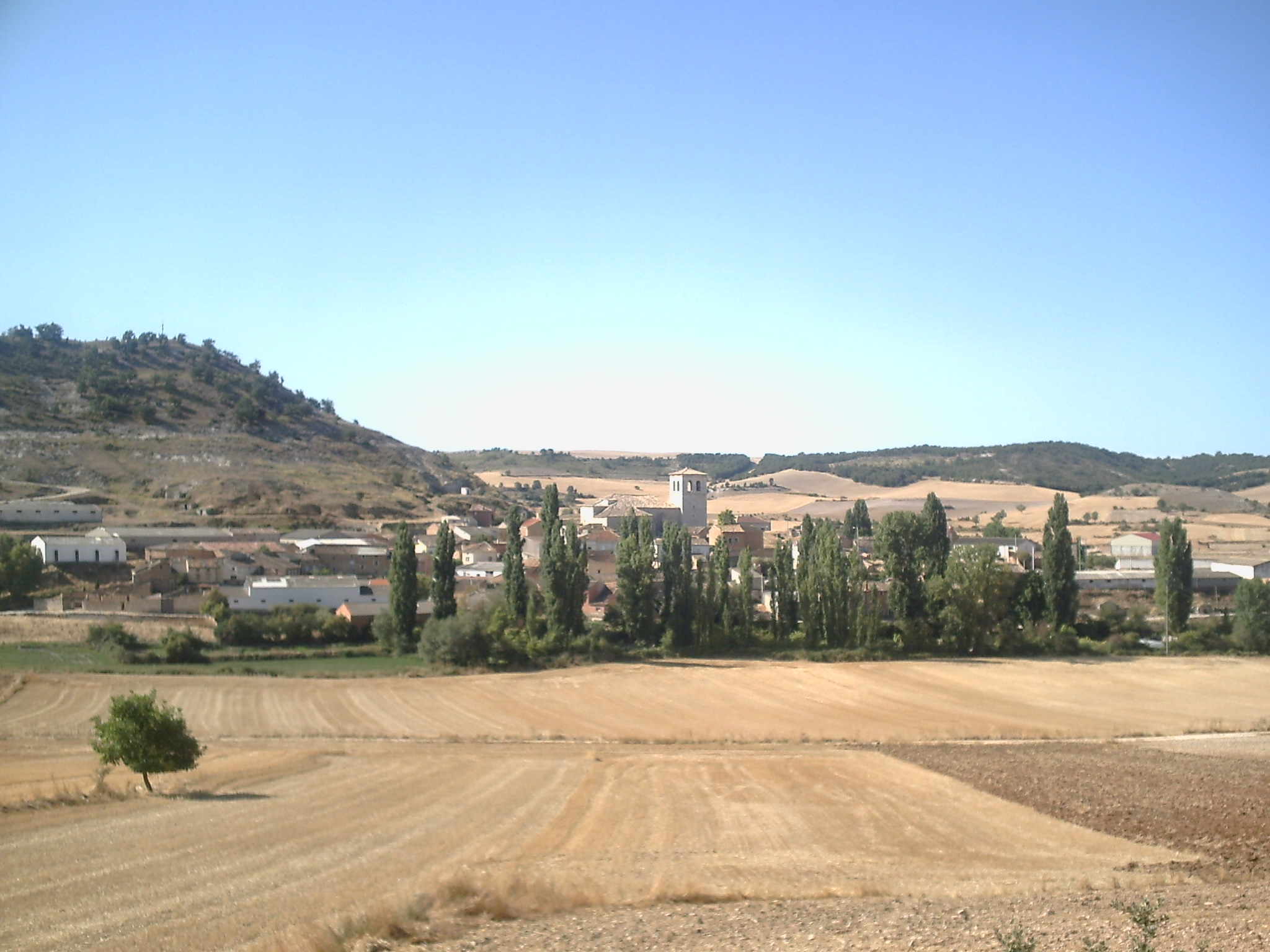
- Map of el Cerrato. Valdecañas de Cerrato in the centre at 313
- Interactive map of Valdecañas de Cerrato
- Coordinates: 41.993°N 4.187°W
- Country: Spain
- Comarca: El Cerrato
- Municipality: Pedanía of Baltanás

Government
  - Mayor: Luís Javier López Modrón (PP)
- Elevation: 810 m (2,660 ft)

Population (2012)
  - Total: 64
- INE
- Postal code: 34249
- Area code: 979

Valdecañas de Cerrato is a town and a district in the municipality of Baltanás. It is located 9 km from Baltanás in the comarca of El Cerrato (Palencia), in the autonomous community of Castile and León (Spain), and belongs to the jurisdiction of Palencia.

== Geography ==
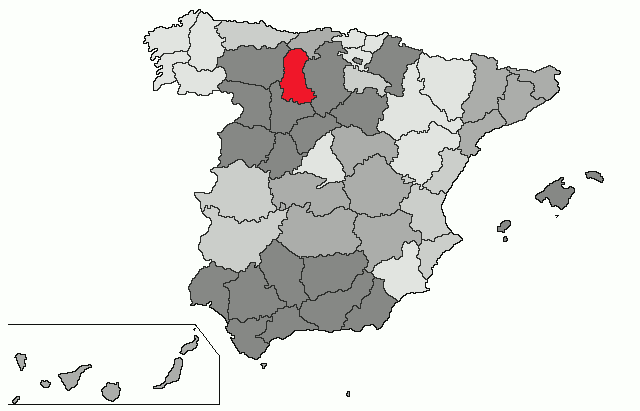
Province of Palencia.

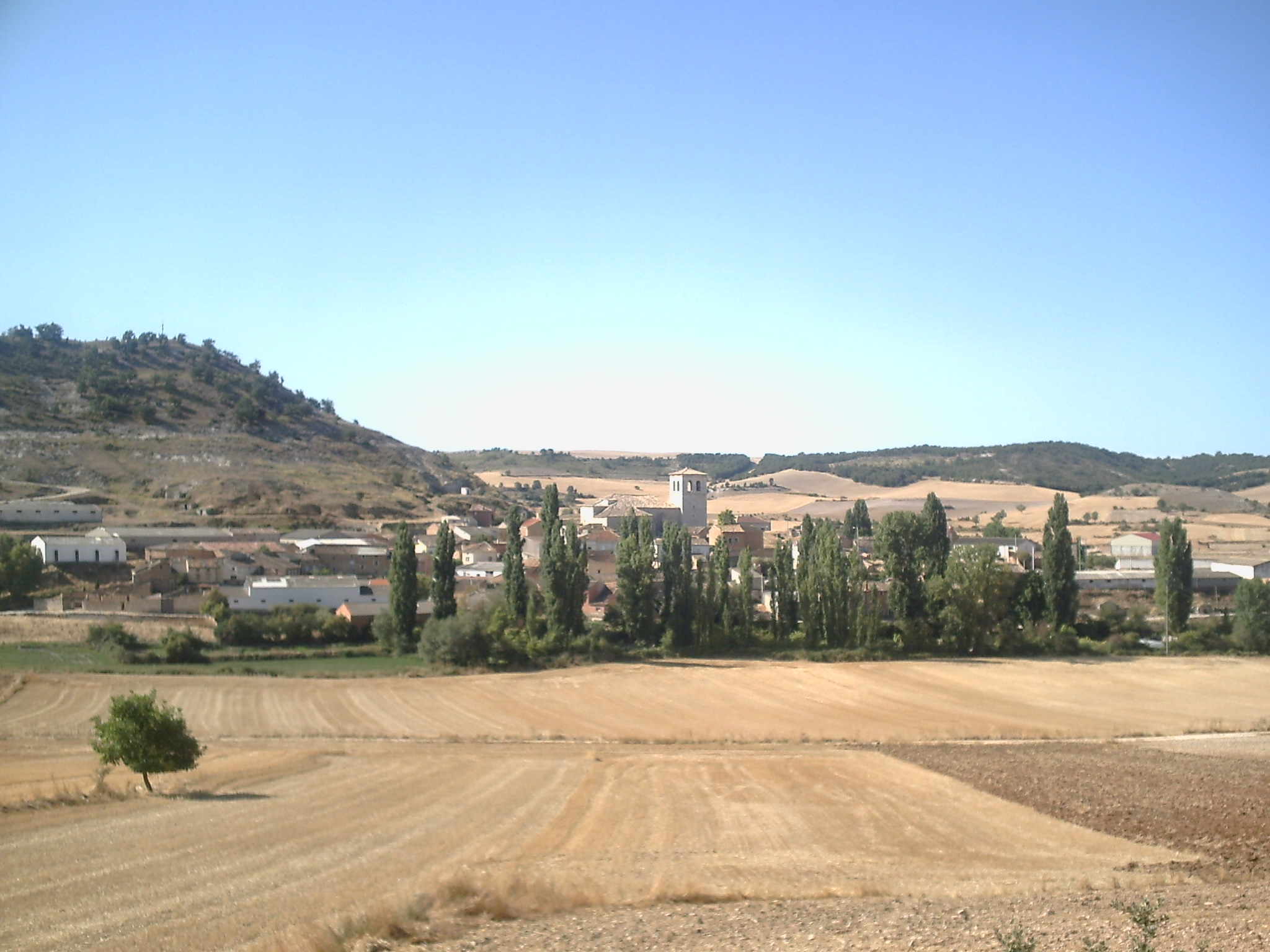
Panoramic view from the Tabanera road.

Valdecañas de Cerrato's geography is dotted with hills surrounded by moors and the population is settled at the foot of the Piyayo peak or the Roble peak, also called "Carrascal hill" in a valley along which the Castillo, Pozo, Valle and Pozuelo streams flow. These meet at the cemetery and supply water to the Cañocaliente, Aguanal, Matilla, Águila, Mojapán, Piedra, Burros and Carropalenzuela springs that flow into the Pisuerga river, which disappear before reaching their outlets.

It lies at a distance of 14 km from the A-62, 37 km from Palencia, 53 km from Burgos and 68 km from Valladolid. To the north it is bordered by Tabanera de Cerrato, Villahán, Palenzuela, Herrera de Valdecañas and Quintana del Puente; to the south by Baltanás, Cevico Navero, Cevico de la Torre, Villaviudas and Villaconancio; to the east by Antigüedad, Cobos de Cerrato and Espinosa de Cerrato; and to the west by Torquemada, Hornillos de Cerrato, Magaz de Pisuerga, Baños de Cerrato, Hontoria de Cerrato and Dueñas.

Its climate is continental, with cold, dry winters. The summers are warm. The spring and autumn are short and pleasant.

== Demography ==
According to statistics provided by the Instituto Nacional de Estadística, the population of Valdecañas de Cerrato as of 1 January 2012, was 64 inhabitants.

== History ==
=== Middle ages ===
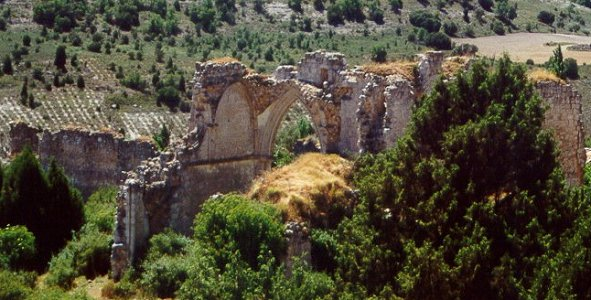
Ruins of the San Pelayo de Cerrato monastery, in Cevico Navero.

The town was repopulated probably around the time when the Counts of Castile tried to defend the territory of El Cerrato. Repopulation was carried out by the Christian armies in the last third of the ninth century. They fortified it with a walled enclosure to protect it from the Hagrite incursions. From this period a necropolis is conserved in the vicinity of the Virgen del Campo hermitage. In 999 the Alfoz of Palenzuela was created, to which the town belonged. In 1070 Doña Domenga donated the monastery of San Pedro de Cardeña to various estates in the municipal term of Bal de Kannas, and in 1074 it was cited as an inheritance in the dowry letter of El Cid. In 1113 his wife, Jimena Díaz, sold a part to the chapter of the Burgos cathedral. The document states:

It's my pleasure to sell you my Valdecañas inheritance. That inheritance is composed of the Monastery of San Pelayo Mártir, with its houses and land, with fields and vineyards and mills and meadows and all that belongs to it, at the price of 500 silver solidus.

In the eleventh century, Ferdinand I of León and Castile added several monasteries to San Pedro de Arlanza, among which were San Facundo and San Martin, located in the town. In 1352 it was listed under the name Valdecañas de Suso and formed part, along with the depopulated Villavaya, then known as Valdecañas la Vieja, in Merindad in El Cerrato, sharing its martiniegas (a special tax) with Palenzuela, which belonged to Gonzalo de Sandoval, a nobleman who was knighted in Burgos by Alfonso XI of Castile with whom he fought in the conquest of Algeciras in 1344, although the natural dominion of both places belonged to the House of Lara.

=== Modern times ===
During the reign of the Catholic Monarchs Valdecañas de Cerrato still belonged to el Cerrato. In 1475 Queen Isabella issued a royal decree imposing a contribution on members of the merino. In the case of the town it was 4,329 maravedis. In 1484 Bernardino Perez de Sarmiento, first Earl of Ribadavia, and head of Galicia, owner of the town of Hornillos de Cerrato, leased the Valdecañas municipal term to Alfonso Enríquez, Admiral of Castile. In 1488 it was taxed by María de Castañeda. In the early sixteenth century the town was among the assets transferred by Teresa Sarmiento, daughter of the Count of Santa Marta, as part of the dowry for her marriage to Pedro Acuña "the Old", second Lord of Villaviudas.

In 1675 it belonged to the lordship of the admiral of Castile, and had five religious buildings: the church of San Nicolás de Bari, and the hermitages of the Virgen del Campo, San Lorenzo, Santa Ana and Magdalena. It had a population of fifty inhabitants, and also had a hospital with two beds, paid for by the council. In 1702 the hermitages of Magdalena and Santa María de Cañuelas were in ruins, and the town's population had dropped to thirty-six residents.

In 1752 it was called Baldecanas de Arriva and belonged to the lordship of Palenzuela in the province of Valladolid. Its population had risen to sixty-six residents, arranged in eighty-six habitable houses and three in ruins. The town comprised 2,500 obradas (about 4000m2) and annual revenue amounted to 509 reals. There was also a flour mill and 28 beehives. In 1783, due to a major epidemic caused by the stagnation of the streams after a flood, the population was decimated leaving thirty residents, of the one hundred and ten that it had previously. The Archbishop de Burgos stepped in to remedy the situation. In 1785 it was called Val de Cañas, and continued to belong to the same lordship, which is why, in the Gazetteer records it is not within the Cerrato judicial district.

== Contemporary era ==
During the Revolutionary War its landscape served as refuge to the Castilian guerrillas. The guerrilla commander, Juan Puertas, attacked the French garrisons located in Torquemada and Quintana del Puente from the hills of the town, between 1808 and 1812. He was hurt on the Reinoso de Cerrato bridge. The populace supplied and aided his group during the encounters.

In 1828 it was called Val de Cañas and, at the administrative level, belonged to the judicial district of Tierra de Campos, while the church remained part of the archbishopric of Burgos. In 1842, Pascual Madoz, in his dictionary, indicated that it had forty-three residents. By 1849 it formed part of the Baltanás judicial district.

At the fall of the Old Regime the town was formed into a constitutional municipality in the Baltanás district, and was known then as Val de Cañas. In the 1842 census 45 homes and 234 residents were counted. In the late 20th century the municipality disappeared when it was integrated into Baltanás. It then had 63 households and 238 inhabitants.

In 1955 it ceased to belong ecclesiastically to the Archdiocese of Burgos, and became part of Palencia. Finally, on February 21, 1974, its inclusion in the municipality of Baltanás, to which it belongs today, was approved.

== Etymology ==
Etymological evolution
Century	Name
11th century	Valle Kannas
11th century	Bal de Kannas
11th century	Valdecannas
14th century	Valdecañas de Suso
15th century	Valdecañas de Suso
18th century	Baldecañas de Arriva
19th century	Val de Cañas
19th century	Valdecañas
20th century	Valdecañas de Cerrato

It was first named Valle Kannas, and the meaning of its name comes from the words val (valley) and caña (reed), so its name means valley of reeds. Throughout its history it was called Baldecañas de Arriva, referring to its position at the top of a hill. Its current name is due to its belonging to the region of El Cerrato, whose etymology comes from the undulating territory crowned with hills.

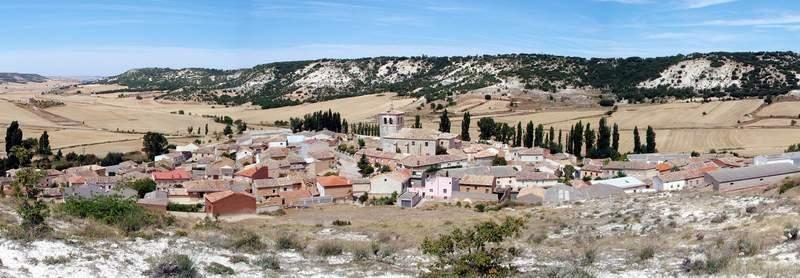
Panoramic view from "Pico del Roble".

== Heritage ==
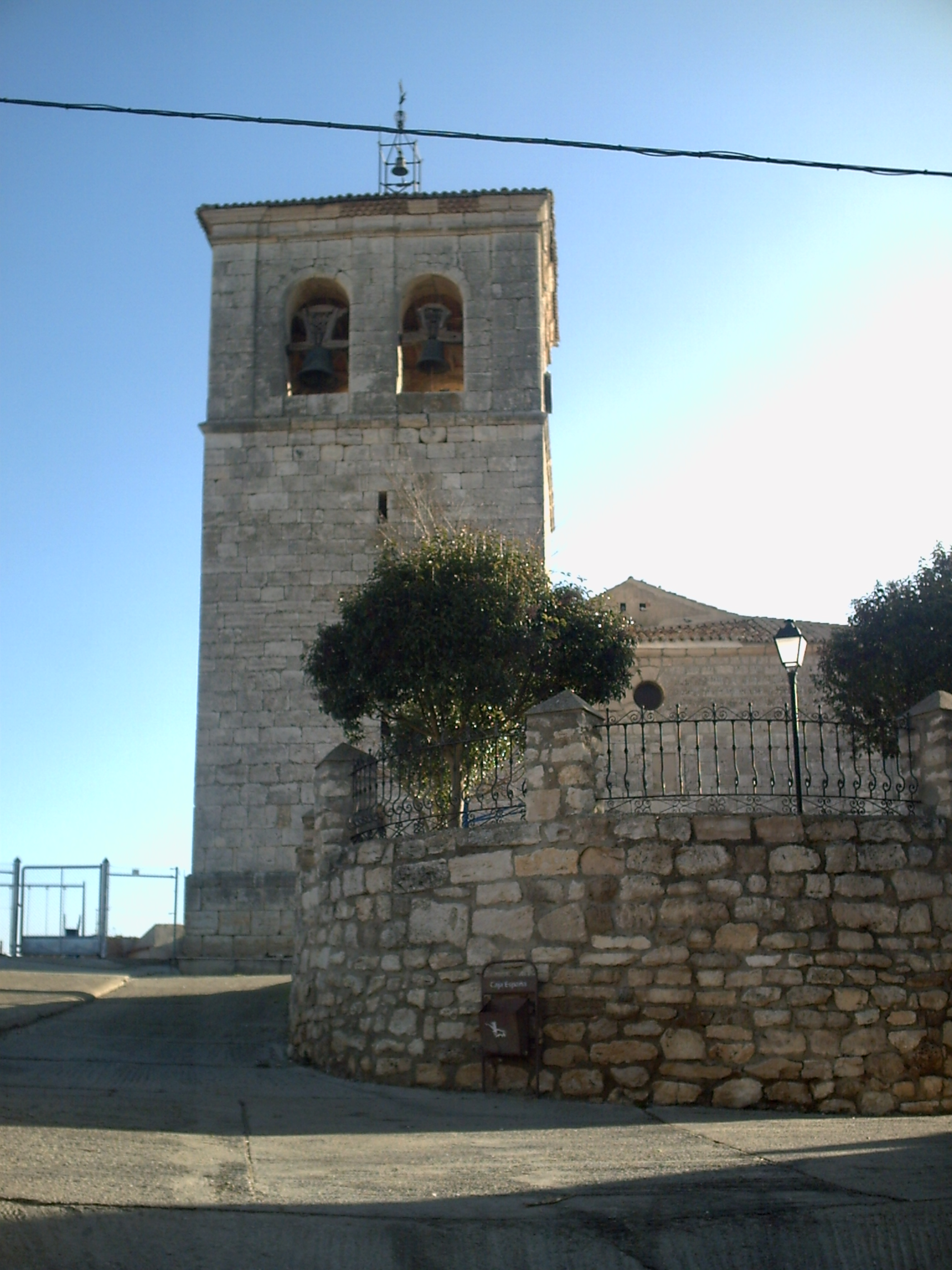
Iglesia de San Nicolás de Bari.

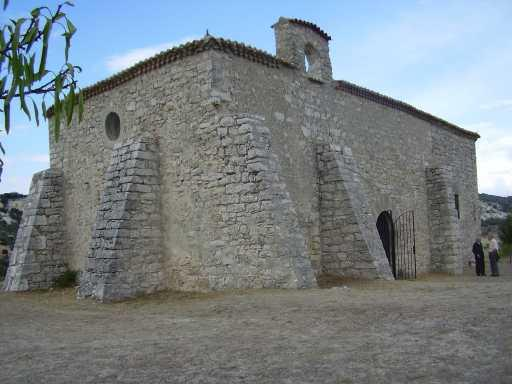
Virgen del Campo hermitage.

=== Iglesia de San Nicolás de Bari ===
Located on the highest point of the city center, the parish church is dedicated to San Nicolás de Bari, and possibly replaced a Romanesque building. It is a baroque style building, dating from the sixteenth century, consisting of three naves, emphasizing its square tower built using ashlar masonry. It has undergone several changes, one of the most important of which was carried out in 1780.

There is a medieval necropolis located beside it and, up to the mid-twentieth century, it retained a Flemish tablet with the "Adoration of the Kings". In 2008 a comprehensive rehabilitation of the building took place, which included the main altarpiece and two collaterals. The Virgen del Campo, patroness of the town, is housed in a lateral chapel which is transferred in a procession to the hermitage on her feast day.

The church housed six fraternities: the Santísimo, the Vera Cruz, the Ánimas, Nuestra Señora del Rosario, the Virgen del Campo and San Nicolás de Bari, patron of the town.

=== Virgen del Campo hermitage ===
Located on the outskirts of the town, at some 500 meters towards the south, it is dedicated to the Virgen del Campo. It was built in the seventeenth century, and it has a Baroque altarpiece presided over by an image of Mary in thirteenth century Gothic style.

Also housed inside is a stone shield that crowns the entrance to a small chapel, belonging to the Tevar family, promoter of a pious work locally. Inside the chapel is an altarpiece dedicated to the Immaculate Conception and a recumbent Christ. Surrounding the chapel is a necropolis dating from the time of the repopulation, where tombs from the eleventh century were found.

=== Fortified houses ===
At the entrance to the town there is a religious building which once served as the priest's rectory. Today it is privately owned, and has, on its façade, a shield of the Virgen del Carmen dated to 1738, accompanied by two sculptures, of San Antonio and Santa Barbara. A sundial survives in one corner. On its interior it has a seventeenth-century coffered ceiling.

Another religious construction is called the 'Casa del Cordón, as evidenced by the umbilical cord and San Francisco shields which are on its façade in plateresque style, reminiscent of the passing of the Franciscan order through the town. At present it still belongs to the Catholic Church and both its exterior and its interior have deteriorated with the passage of time. There is also an emblazoned civil building, now privately owned, built in ashlar masonry, with a heraldic shield on the façade and arched windows. It is believed that the construction consisted of a large utility building, possibly a hospital or care facility.

=== Traditional architecture ===
The traditional architecture of the town is noted in the form of one or two storey buildings with a loft, distributed in typical Castilian style. For their facades mainly adobe and limestone in a whitish hue are used, typical of the area. Regarding the stonework, there is indication that these were influenced by the stonemasons from Merindad de Trasmiera (Cantabria). They worked on both religious rehabilitations as well as on civil constructions.

Also notable among this type of construction are the cellars dug into the subsoil, denoting the wine activity in the area. They are located mainly on the Piyayo hillside, but can also be found around the churchyard and other urban areas. There are also traditional shepherd huts, which are one of the most characteristic buildings in the architecture of el Cerrato. These are circular buildings made of stone without any mortar, the door climatologically facing south, provided shelter and refuge for shepherds.

Doorway details - 16th century house – Wine cellars - Shepherd Hut - Adobe houses.

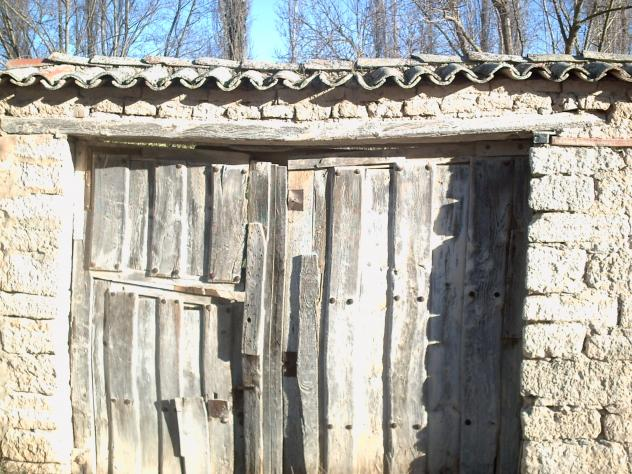

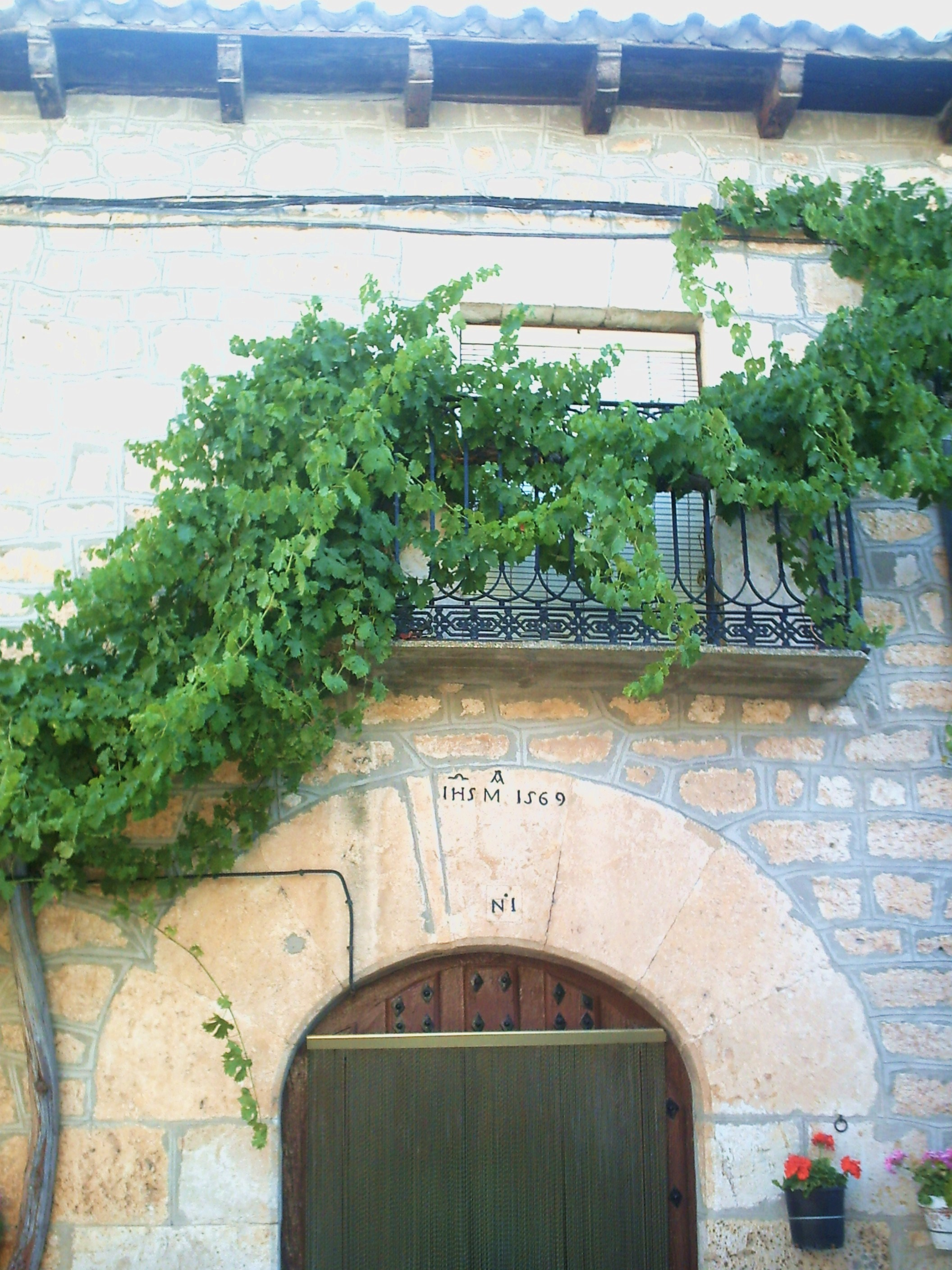

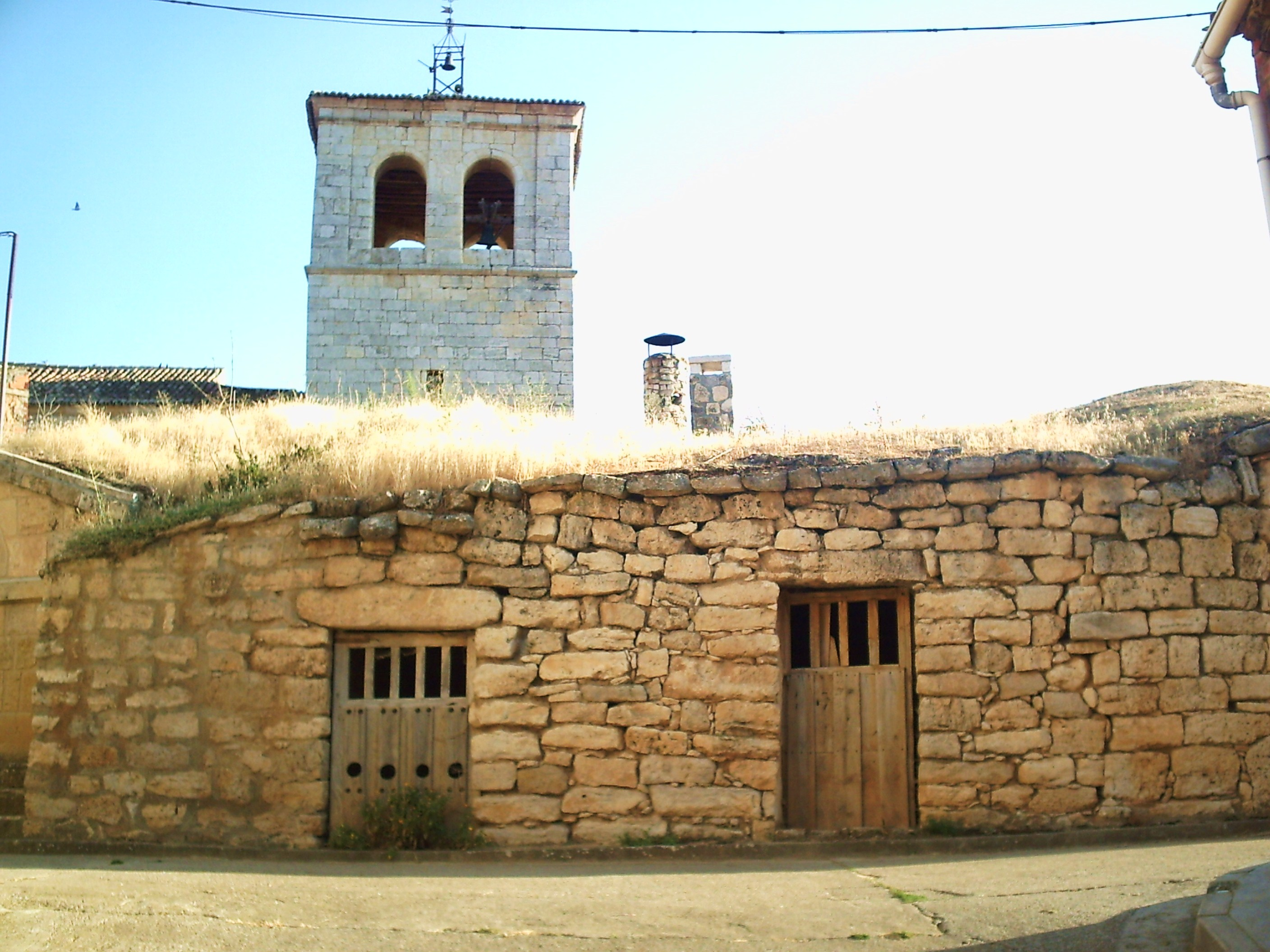

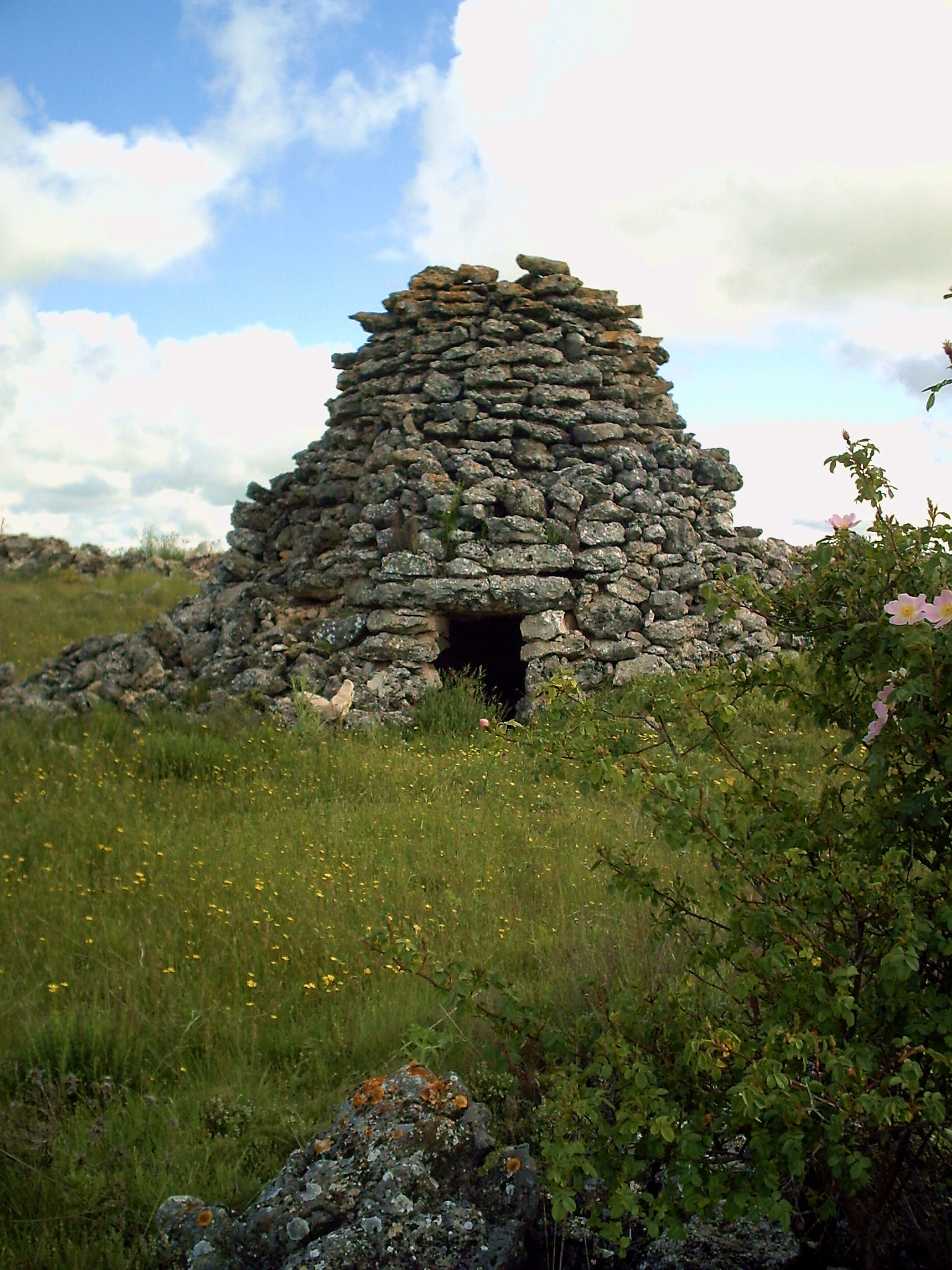

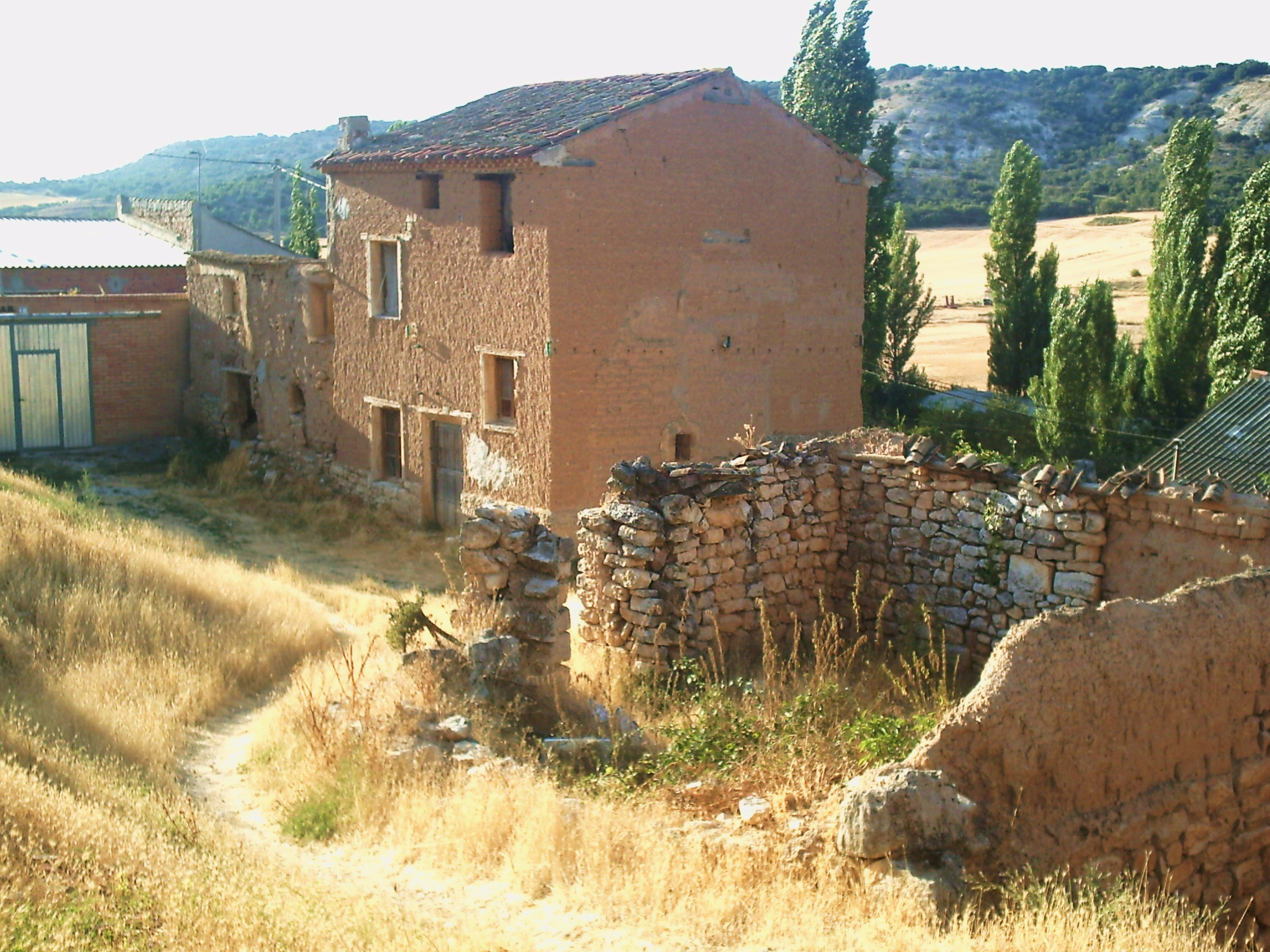

=== El Castillo ===
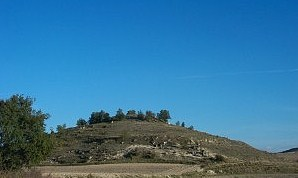
Upper area of the valley, where the ruins of the castle are located.

On the outskirts of the village, about 4 km to the north, in the valley, on an isolated hill, are the remains of a fortification known as El Castillo, which is surrounded by the Ontanilla and Castillo streams. Its ruins cover an uneven surface, 90 by 27 m in length and width. It is surrounded by an unhewn stone wall with a thickness of 1.8 m and a maximum height of 1.2 m. Inside are the remains of a tower located in the broader area, of which 2.50 m in height are preserved. The amount of loose stones makes it difficult to calculate the length of the sides, which can be estimated between 7 and 9 m.

Villovayo, which was abandoned in 1516, was located near to the castle as well as the Santa Ana hermitage in the area known as Roblecinto. There are also the remains of a similar fortification. The ashlar stones that were used to build these fortresses are no longer being used for the construction of other buildings and so their walls remain bare and exposed to incessant destructive action, weathering and erosion.

=== Cañada Real Burgalesa ===
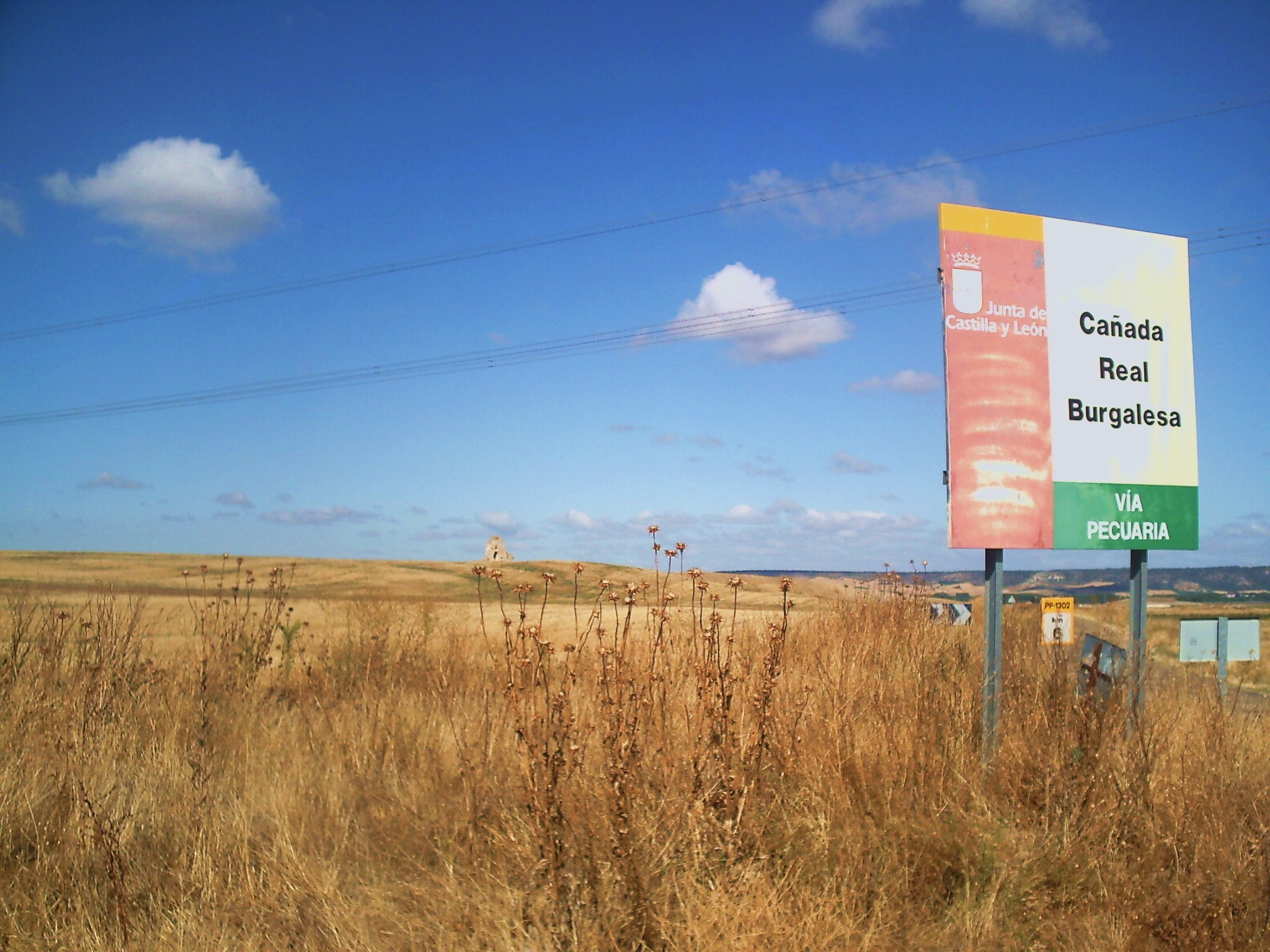
The Cañada Real in its path through the town.

Notably the Burgalesa-Soriana Occidental section of the Cañada Real, 700 km long, with exit in Soriano, crossed through Valdecañas de Cerrato from Tabanera and continued south to Hornillos de Cerrato. This was a major cattle route for the transhumance of sheep making it possible to move around the entire Peninsula. Nearby are several buildings in ruins. The wilderness is called Valdecañuelas. The façade of a religious building is preserved. The most abundant sheep in this valdecañesa area were the churra. The wool was taken to the Cantabria and Vizcaya ports.

== See also ==
- List of municipalities in Palencia
- El Cerrato

== Bibliography ==
- Alcalde Crespo, Gonzalo (1997). El Cerrato palentino. Ediciones Cálamo. ISBN 84-921734-8-3.
- Casas Carnicero, Ángel (1980), "Algunos planteamientos antropológicos palentinos", Publicaciones de la Institución Tello Téllez de Meneses, no. 44, pp. 277–320, ISSN 0210-7317
- Cepeda Calzada, Pablo (1983). Baltanás, capital del Cerrato. Apuntes para un pueblo. I.T.T.M. - Diputación Provincial de Palencia. ISBN 84-500-9001-6.
- Cepeda Calzada, Pablo (1989), Valdecañas de Cerrato, ISSN 0210-7317
- Huidobro Serna, Luciano (1956). Historia del partido de Baltanás. Dialnet - Diputación Provincial de Palencia. ISSN 0210-7317.
- Vallejo del Busto, Manuel (1978). El Cerrato castellano. Diputación Provincial de Palencia. pp. 343–345. ISBN 84-505-6347-X.
