= Venta de Baños =

- Municipality
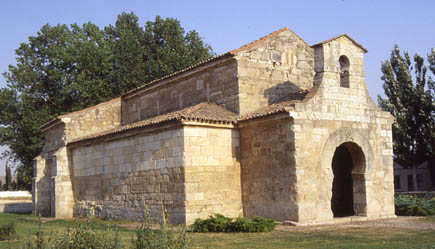
- Church of San Juan Bautista, founded in 661 AD

- Coat of arms

- Location in Spain Venta de Baños (Spain)
- Coordinates: 41°56′N 4°30′W
- Country: Spain
- Autonomous community: Castile and León
- Province: Palencia
- Comarca: El Cerrato
- Judicial district: Palencia
- Commonwealth: El Cerrato
- Founded: 1860

Government
  - Mayor: Consolación Pablos Labajo (2007) (PSOE)

Area
  - Total: 14.25 km^{2} (5.50 sq mi)
- Elevation: 723 m (2,372 ft)

Population (2025-01-01)
  - Total: 6,372
  - Density: 447.2/km^{2} (1,158/sq mi)
- Demonym(s): Venteños, Ventabañenses
- Time zone: UTC+1 (CET)
  - Summer (DST): UTC+2 (CEST)
- Postal code: 34200
- Official language(s): Spanish
- Website: Official website

Venta de Baños is a small town and municipality of about 6,400 inhabitants located in the Cerrato district of the province of Palencia, part of the autonomous community of Castile and León in central Spain. It lies some 10 km south of the provincial capital, Palencia. Noteworthy monuments include the medieval Church of San Juan Bautista (St John the Baptist) which is believed to be Visigothic.

Renfe (Spanish National Railways) and the Cerealto food-sector company are the main employers in the municipality.

In popular culture and among Spanish railway travellers, Venta de Baños has traditionally had the same sort of iconic status as other great railway junctions of the world, such as Crewe in the UK. Before the advent of dedicated high-speed rail routes and cheaper air travel, it was the principal transfer point for travellers between the north-east and north-west regions of Spain and the south. Generations of railway passengers have memories of the waiting rooms and cafeteria at Venta de Baños.

The town hosts an annual international cross country running competition, the Cross Internacional de Venta de Baños, which has featured some of the world's foremost cross country athletes including Kenenisa Bekele and Palencian-born Marta Domínguez.

== Twin towns - sister cities ==
- Coulounieix-Chamiers, France
- Tifariti, Western Sahara
