= Espinosa de Cerrato =

Coordinates: 41°58′N 3°57′W

- municipality
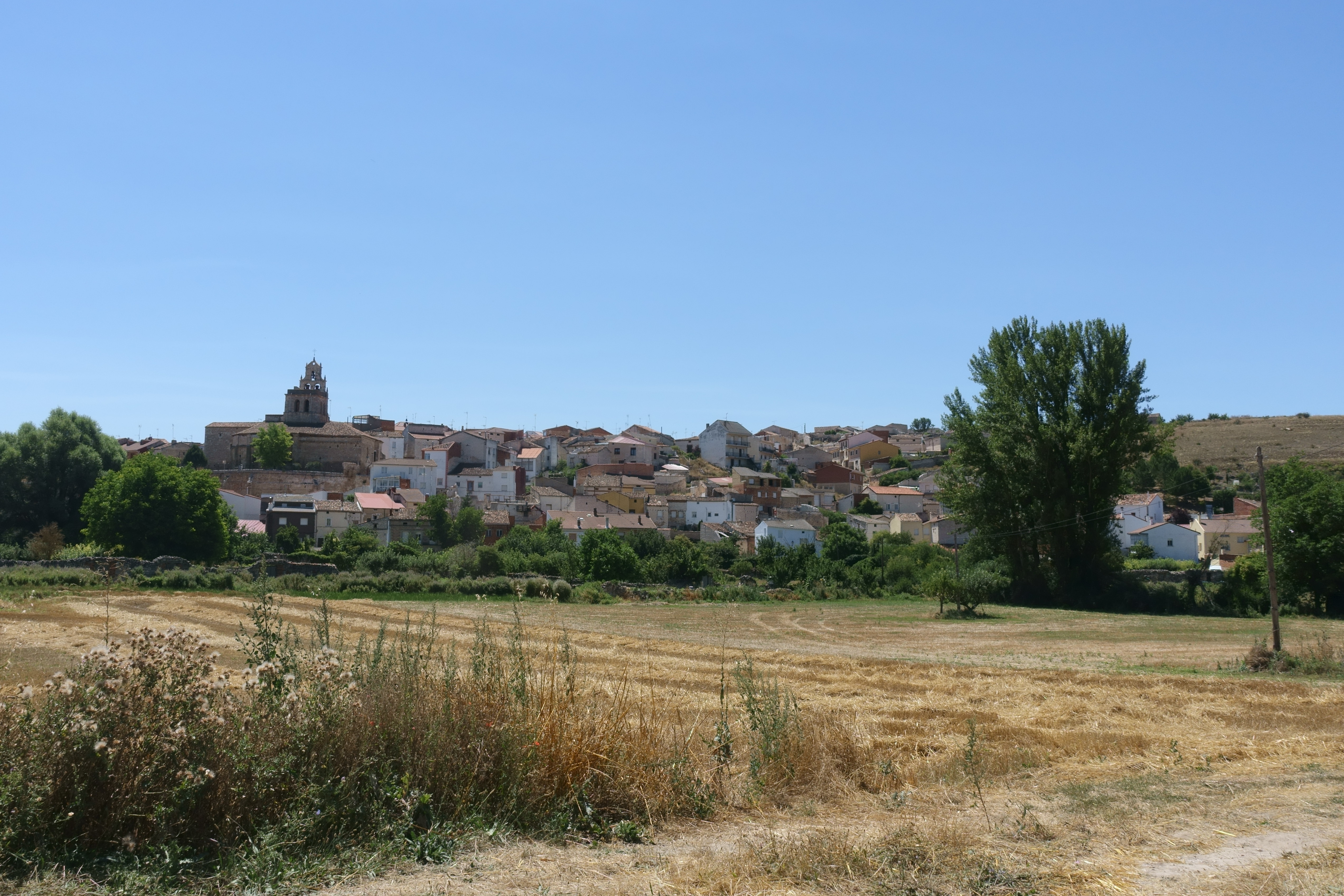

- Flag Coat of arms
- Interactive map of Espinosa de Cerrato
- Country: Spain
- Autonomous community: Castile and León
- Province: Palencia
- Municipality: Espinosa de Cerrato

Area
  - Total: 45 km^{2} (17 sq mi)

Population (2025-01-01)
  - Total: 119
  - Density: 2.6/km^{2} (6.8/sq mi)
- Time zone: UTC+1 (CET)
  - Summer (DST): UTC+2 (CEST)
- Website: Official website

Espinosa de Cerrato is a municipality located in the province of Palencia, Castile and León, Spain. According to the 2004 census (INE), the municipality has a population of 225 inhabitants.

== Demography ==
1900	1910	1920	1930	1940	1950	1960	1970	1981	1991
862	891	952	991	1.036	1.020	922	520	395	312

== History ==
Espinosa de Cerrato in medieval times was a village dedicated to breeding major cattle. It was donated by Alfonso VIII to Pedro Martínez Ihobas, as a recognition for his services in the military. Pedro Martinez Ihobas in turn gave it to the Abbey of San Miguel de Treviño in 1170.

This village, nicknamed of Riofranco, was sold to Palenzuela in 1323. By 1352 it belonged to Merindad del Cerrato under the jurisdiction of Palenzuela.

In the middle of the 14th century, Espinosa was the queen's property. In 1752, a lawsuit between the Duchess of Alba and Count of Benavente was submitted claiming the ownership of the village.

In 1785, it was an abbatial village and so it continues until the 19th century. In those times, it had the Saint Martin church and the Saint Roque and Saint Lucia hermitages and belonged ecclesiastically to the Diocese of Burgos. It was in 1955 that became a part of the Diocese of Palencia.

Still in the 18th century, as a town, it counted six hermitages that covered the religious needs of the growing community.
