= Melgar de Yuso =

Coordinates: 42°15′N 4°15′W

- municipality
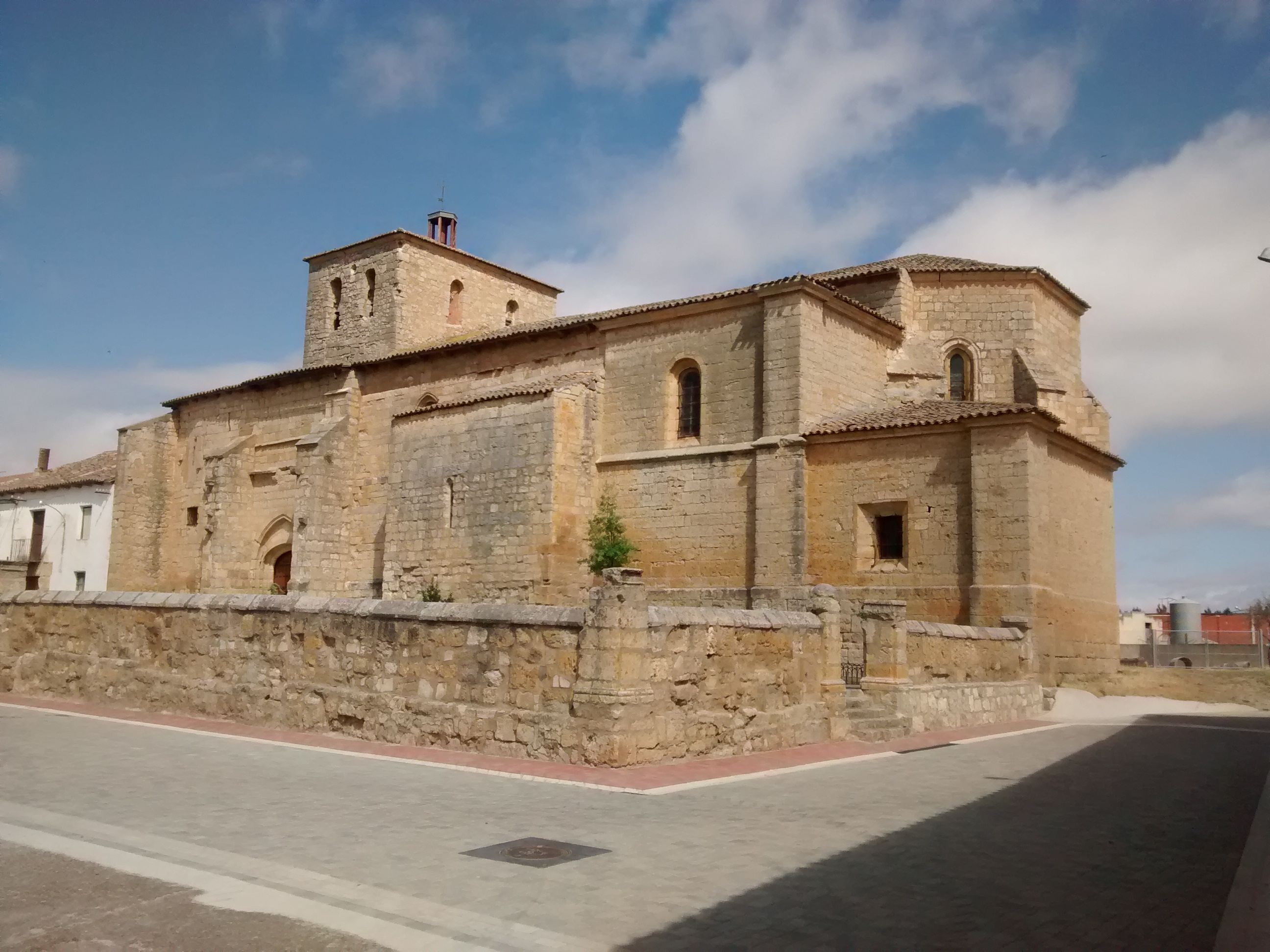

- Flag Coat of arms
- Interactive map of Melgar de Yuso
- Country: Spain
- Autonomous community: Castile and León
- Province: Palencia
- Municipality: Melgar de Yuso

Area
  - Total: 26 km^{2} (10 sq mi)

Population (2025-01-01)
  - Total: 269
  - Density: 10/km^{2} (27/sq mi)
- Time zone: UTC+1 (CET)
  - Summer (DST): UTC+2 (CEST)
- Website: Official website

Melgar de Yuso is a municipality located in the province of Palencia, Castile and León, Spain. According to the 2004 census (INE), the municipality has a population of 351 inhabitants.
