= Soto de Cerrato =

Coordinates: 41°57′N 4°25′W

- municipality
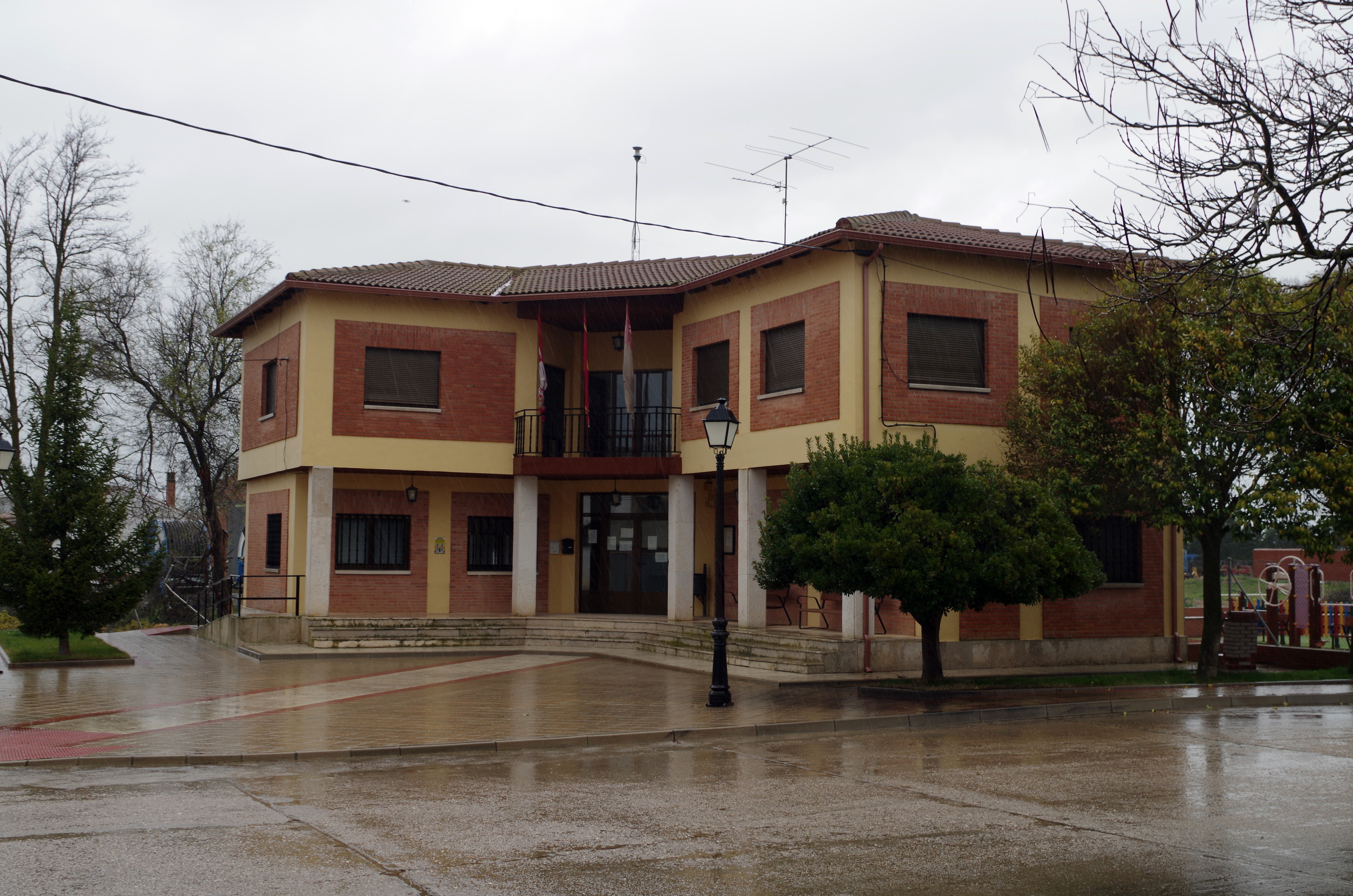

- Flag Coat of arms
- Interactive map of Soto de Cerrato
- Country: Spain
- Autonomous community: Castile and León
- Province: Palencia
- Municipality: Soto de Cerrato

Area
  - Total: 12 km^{2} (4.6 sq mi)
- Elevation: 720 m (2,360 ft)

Population (2025-01-01)
  - Total: 166
  - Density: 14/km^{2} (36/sq mi)
- Time zone: UTC+1 (CET)
  - Summer (DST): UTC+2 (CEST)
- Website: Official website

Soto de Cerrato is a municipality located in the province of Palencia, Castile and León, Spain. According to the 2004 census (INE), the municipality has a population of 212 inhabitants.
