= Cobos de Cerrato =

Coordinates: 42°02′N 4°00′W

- municipality
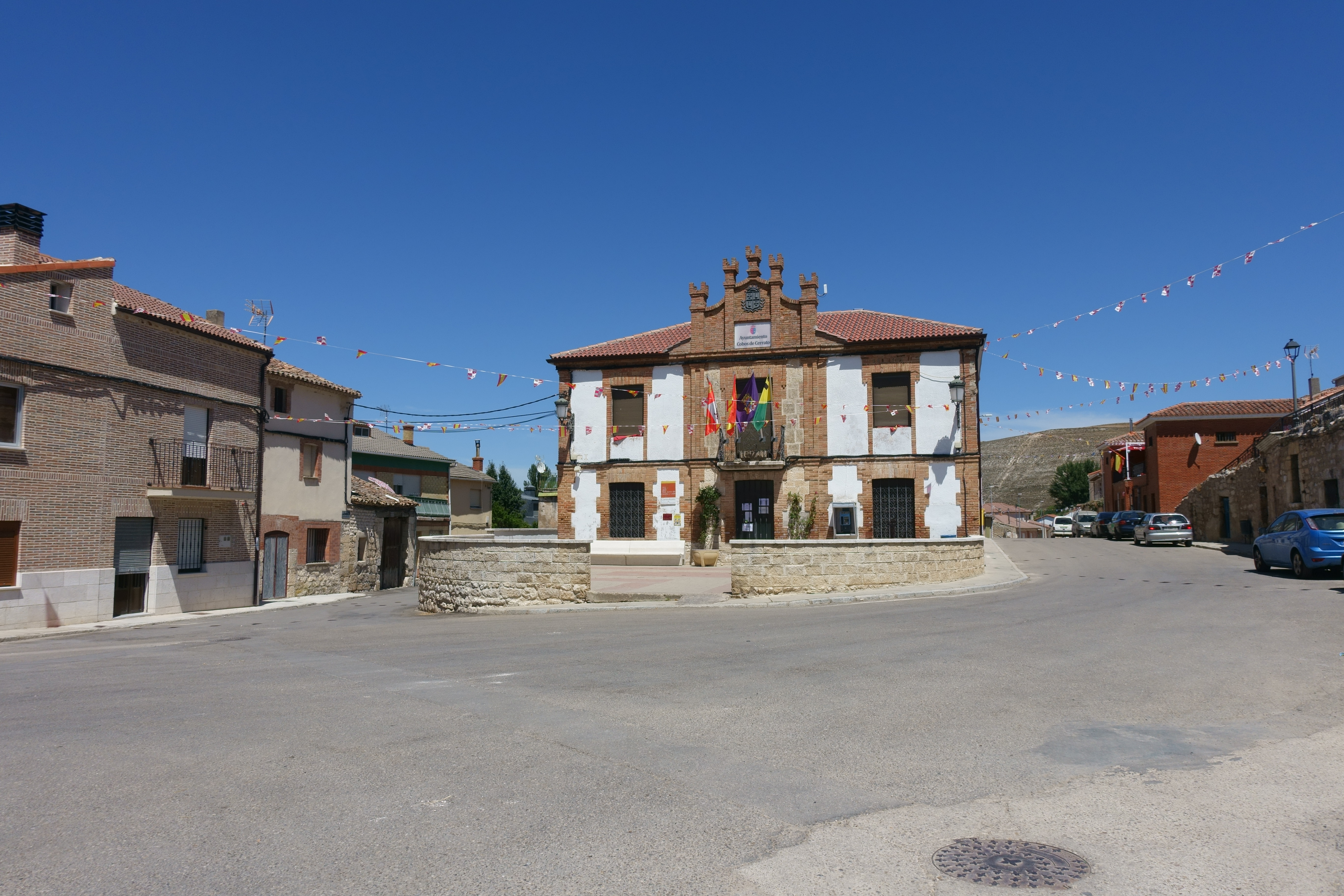

- Flag Coat of arms
- Interactive map of Cobos de Cerrato
- Country: Spain
- Autonomous community: Castile and León
- Province: Palencia
- Municipality: Cobos de Cerrato

Area
  - Total: 46.51 km^{2} (17.96 sq mi)
- Elevation: 824 m (2,703 ft)

Population (2025-01-01)
  - Total: 129
  - Density: 2.77/km^{2} (7.18/sq mi)
- Time zone: UTC+1 (CET)
  - Summer (DST): UTC+2 (CEST)
- Website: Official website

Cobos de Cerrato is a municipality in the province of Palencia, Castile and León, Spain, with 139 inhabitants as of the 2018 INE census.
