= Vertavillo =

- municipality
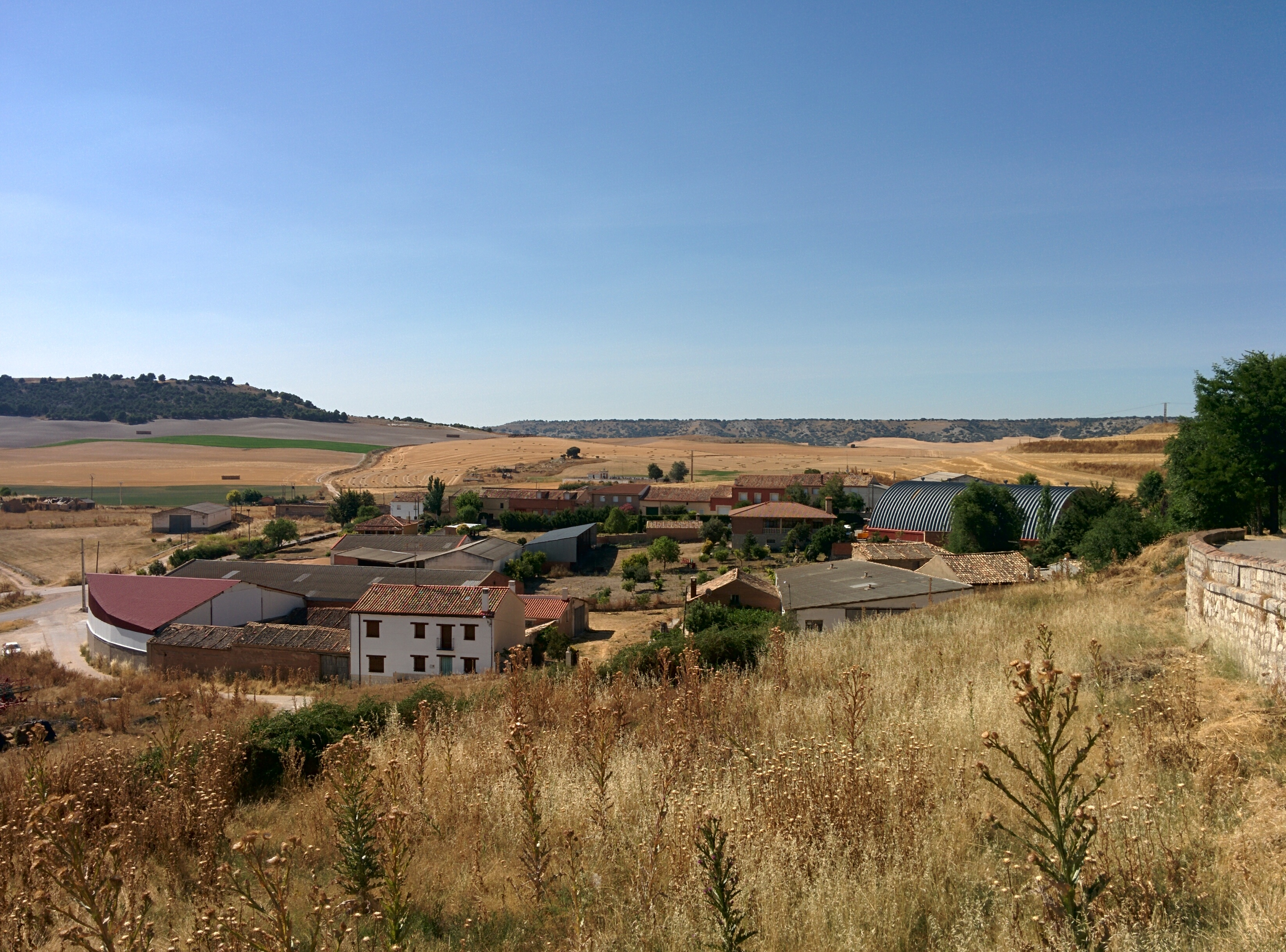

- Flag Coat of arms
- Interactive map of Vertavillo
- Coordinates: 41°50′N 4°19′W
- Country: Spain
- Autonomous community: Castile and León
- Province: Palencia
- Municipality: Vertavillo

Area
  - Total: 57 km^{2} (22 sq mi)

Population (2025-01-01)
  - Total: 162
  - Density: 2.8/km^{2} (7.4/sq mi)
- Time zone: UTC+1 (CET)
  - Summer (DST): UTC+2 (CEST)
- Website: Official website

Vertavillo is a municipality located in the province of Palencia, Castile and León, Spain. According to the 2017 census (INE), the municipality has a population of 197 inhabitants.
