= Cevico Navero =

- Municipality
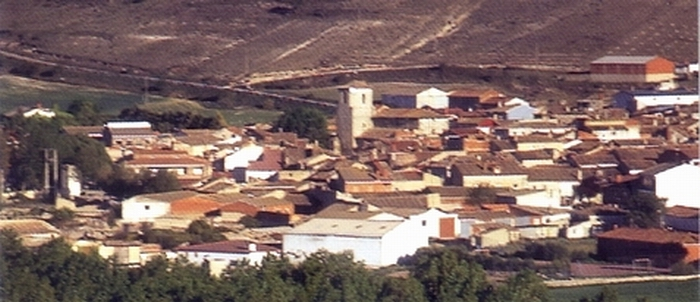

- Location in Spain.
- Coordinates: 41°51′40″N 4°11′40″W
- Country: Spain
- Autonomous community: Castile and León
- Province: Palencia
- Comarca: El Cerrato

Government
  - Mayor: Pablo Calvo Esteban

Area
  - Total: 43 km^{2} (17 sq mi)

Population (2025)
  - Total: 175
  - Density: 4.1/km^{2} (11/sq mi)
- Demonym: Ceviqueños
- Time zone: UTC+1 (CET)
  - Summer (DST): UTC+2 (CEST)
- Website: Official website

Cevico Navero is a municipality in the province of Palencia, Castile and León, Spain. As of 2025, the municipality has 175 residents.

== Main sights ==
- Church of Nuestra Señora de la Paz, built in Romanesque style in the 12th-13th centuries (of this period)
- Ruins of the Monastery of San Pelayo de Cerrato, built in the 10th century
