= Villaviudas =

Coordinates: 41°58′N 4°20′W

- municipality
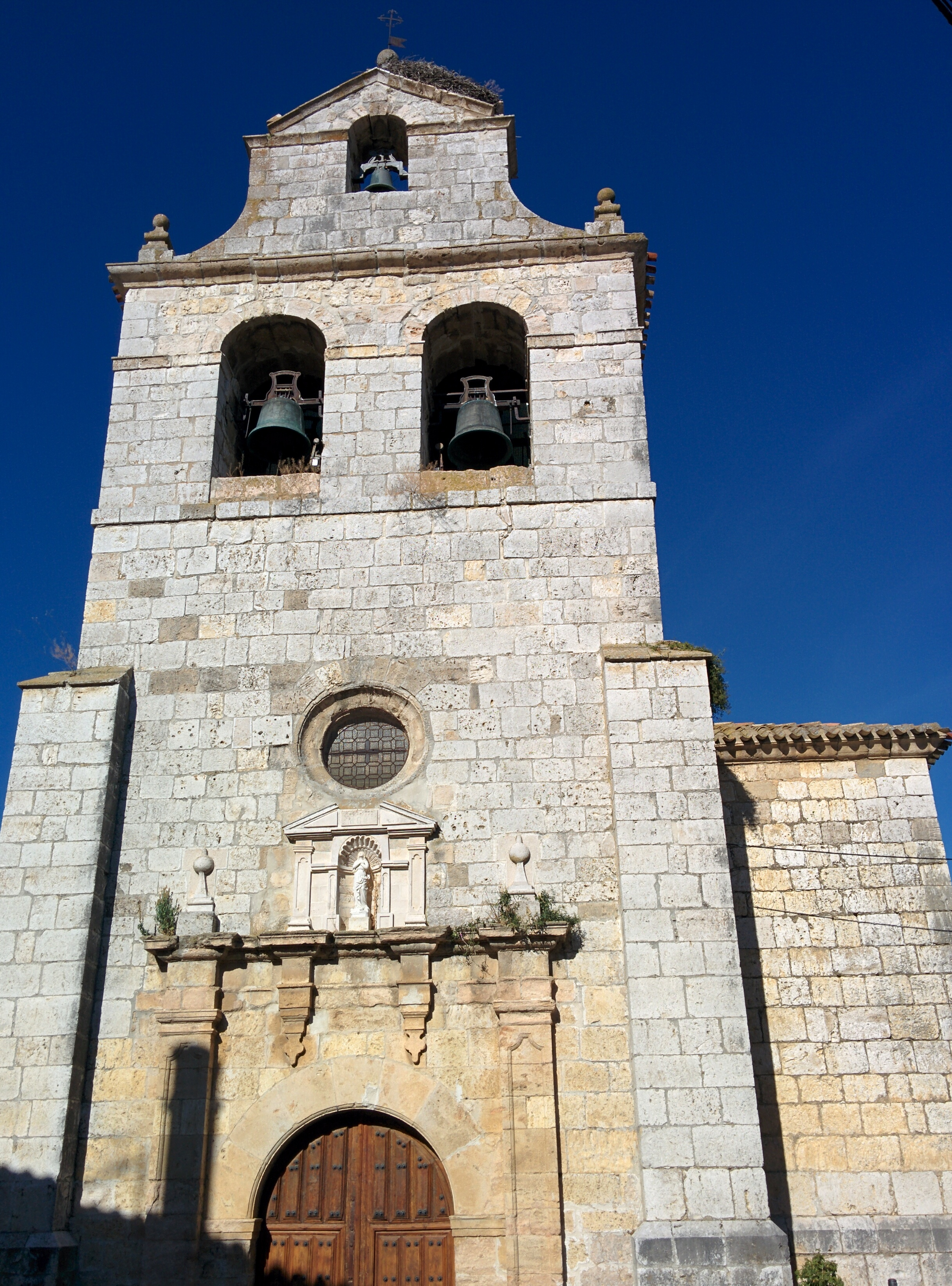

- Flag Coat of arms
- Interactive map of Villaviudas
- Country: Spain
- Autonomous community: Castile and León
- Province: Palencia

Area
  - Total: 37 km^{2} (14 sq mi)

Population (2025-01-01)
  - Total: 356
  - Density: 9.6/km^{2} (25/sq mi)
- Time zone: UTC+1 (CET)
  - Summer (DST): UTC+2 (CEST)
- Website: Official website

Villaviudas is a municipality located in the province of Palencia, Castile and León, Spain. According to the 2022 census (INE), the municipality has a population of 361 inhabitants.
