= Reinoso de Cerrato =

Coordinates: 41°59′N 4°23′W

- municipality
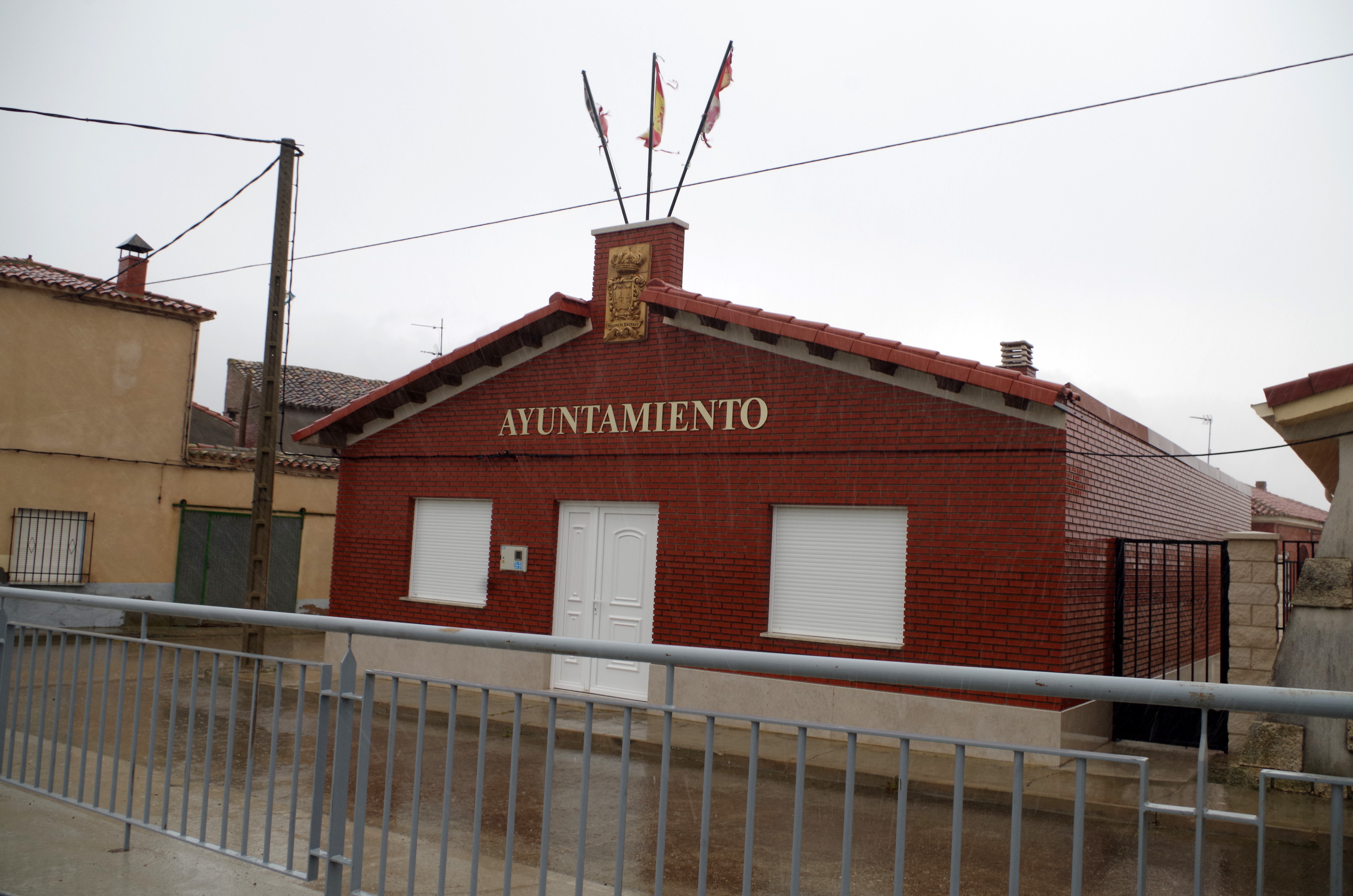

- Flag Coat of arms
- Interactive map of Reinoso de Cerrato
- Country: Spain
- Autonomous community: Castile and León
- Province: Palencia

Area
  - Total: 23.13 km^{2} (8.93 sq mi)
- Elevation: 740 m (2,430 ft)

Population (2025-01-01)
  - Total: 58
  - Density: 2.5/km^{2} (6.5/sq mi)
- Time zone: UTC+1 (CET)
  - Summer (DST): UTC+2 (CEST)
- Website: Official website

Reinoso de Cerrato is a municipality located in the province of Palencia, Castile and León, Spain. According to the 2018 census (INE), the municipality had a population of 53 inhabitants.
