= Castroverde de Cerrato =

Coordinates: 41°45′N 4°13′W

Castroverde de Cerrato, Spain
- Coat of arms

- Country: Spain
- Autonomous community: Castile and León
- Province: Valladolid
- Municipality: Castroverde de Cerrato

Area
  - Total: 32 km^{2} (12 sq mi)

Population (2025-01-01)
  - Total: 192
  - Density: 6.0/km^{2} (16/sq mi)
- Time zone: UTC+1 (CET)
  - Summer (DST): UTC+2 (CEST)

Castroverde de Cerrato is a municipality located in the province of Valladolid, Castile and León, Spain. According to the 2004 census (INE), the municipality has a population of 266 inhabitants.
