= Magaz de Pisuerga =

Coordinates: 41.9833°N 4.41667°W

- municipality
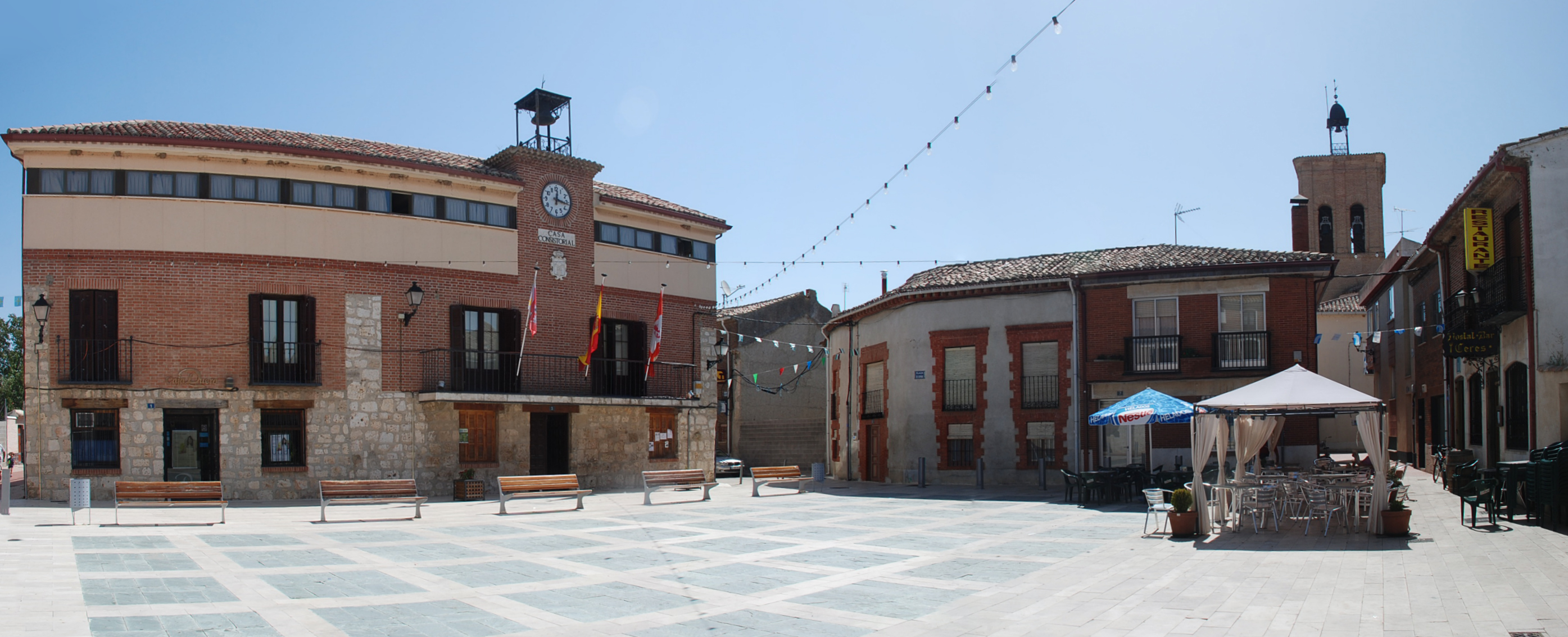

- Flag Coat of arms
- Interactive map of Magaz de Pisuerga
- Country: Spain
- Autonomous community: Castile and León
- Province: Palencia
- Municipality: Magaz de Pisuerga

Area
  - Total: 27 km^{2} (10 sq mi)

Population (2025-01-01)
  - Total: 1,065
  - Density: 39/km^{2} (100/sq mi)
- Time zone: UTC+1 (CET)
  - Summer (DST): UTC+2 (CEST)
- Website: Official website

Magaz de Pisuerga is a municipality located in the province of Palencia, Castile and León, Spain. According to the 2004 census (INE), the municipality has a population of 755 inhabitants.
