= Cordovilla la Real =

Coordinates: 42°05′N 4°15′W

- municipality
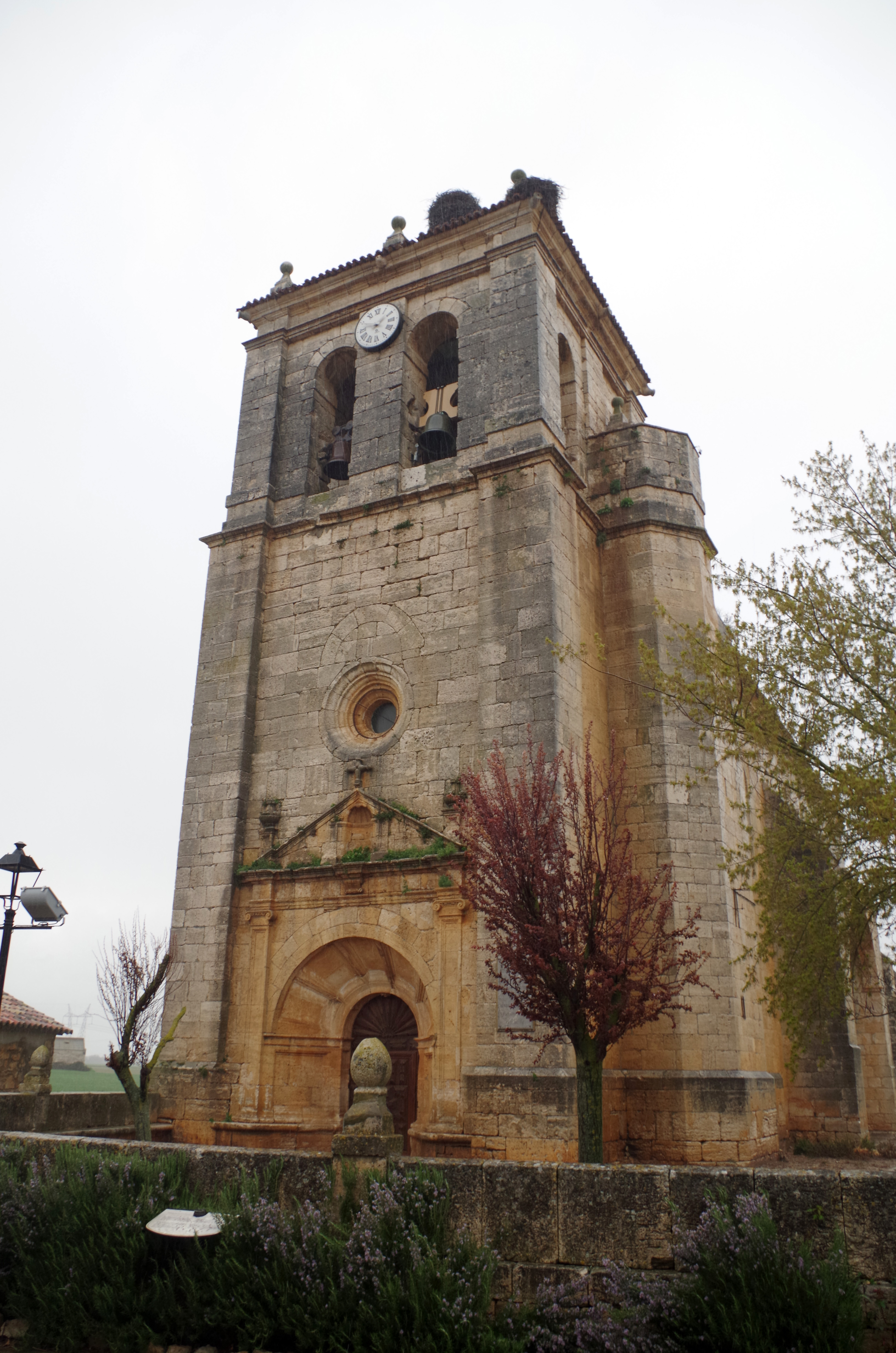
- Town church
- Interactive map of Cordovilla la Real
- Country: Spain
- Autonomous community: Castile and León
- Province: Palencia
- Municipality: Cordovilla la Real

Area
  - Total: 38.81 km^{2} (14.98 sq mi)
- Elevation: 744 m (2,441 ft)

Population (2025-01-01)
  - Total: 130
  - Density: 3.3/km^{2} (8.7/sq mi)
- Time zone: UTC+1 (CET)
  - Summer (DST): UTC+2 (CEST)
- Website: Official website

Cordovilla la Real is a municipality located in the province of Palencia, Castile and León, Spain. According to the 2004 census (INE), the municipality had a population of 117 inhabitants.
