= Villaconancio =

Coordinates: 41°52′N 4°13′W

- municipality
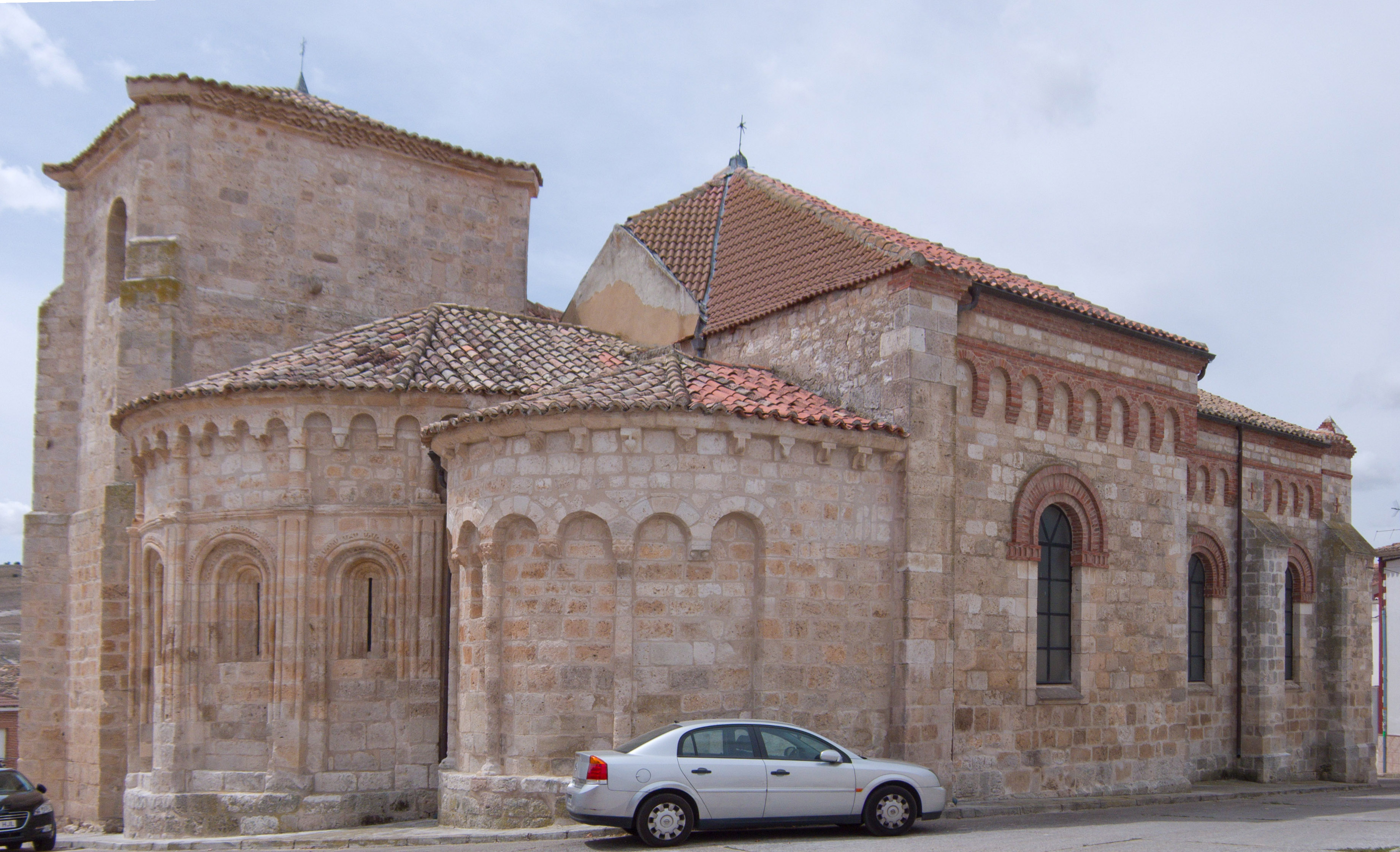
- Interactive map of Villaconancio
- Country: Spain
- Autonomous community: Castile and León
- Province: Palencia

Area
  - Total: 34 km^{2} (13 sq mi)

Population (2025-01-01)
  - Total: 48
  - Density: 1.4/km^{2} (3.7/sq mi)
- Time zone: UTC+1 (CET)
  - Summer (DST): UTC+2 (CEST)
- Website: Official website

Villaconancio is a municipality located in the province of Palencia, Castile and León, Spain. According to the 2004 census (INE), the municipality has a population of 85 inhabitants.
