= Valbuena de Pisuerga =

Coordinates: 42°09′N 4°14′W

- municipality
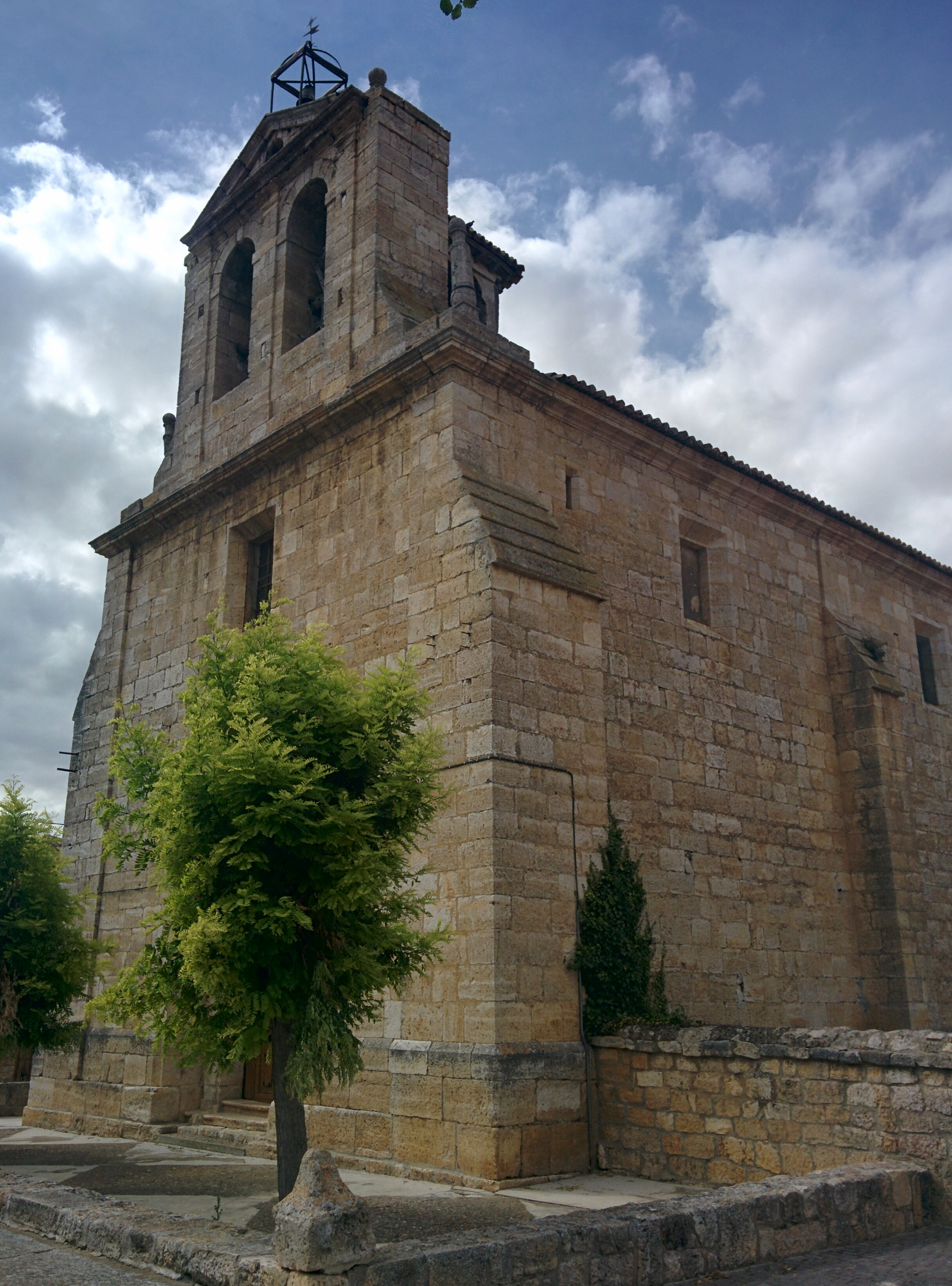
- Interactive map of Valbuena de Pisuerga
- Country: Spain
- Autonomous community: Castile and León
- Province: Palencia
- Municipality: Valbuena de Pisuerga

Area
  - Total: 28 km^{2} (11 sq mi)

Population (2025-01-01)
  - Total: 49
  - Density: 1.8/km^{2} (4.5/sq mi)
- Time zone: UTC+1 (CET)
  - Summer (DST): UTC+2 (CEST)
- Website: Official website

Valbuena de Pisuerga is a municipality located in the province of Palencia, Castile and León, Spain. According to the 2004 census (INE), the municipality had a population of 68.
