= Villalaco =

Coordinates: 42°09′N 4°15′W

- municipality
- Interactive map of Villalaco
- Country: Spain
- Autonomous community: Castile and León
- Province: Palencia
- Municipality: Villalaco

Area
  - Total: 18 km^{2} (6.9 sq mi)
- Elevation: 767 m (2,516 ft)

Population (2025-01-01)
  - Total: 67
  - Density: 3.7/km^{2} (9.6/sq mi)
- Time zone: UTC+1 (CET)
  - Summer (DST): UTC+2 (CEST)

Villalaco is a municipality located in the province of Palencia, Castile and León, Spain. According to the 2004 census (INE), the municipality has a population of 74 inhabitants.

The front of the Villalaco church has a conjuratory under the bell gable.
