= Villahán =

Coordinates: 42°03′N 4°08′W

- municipality
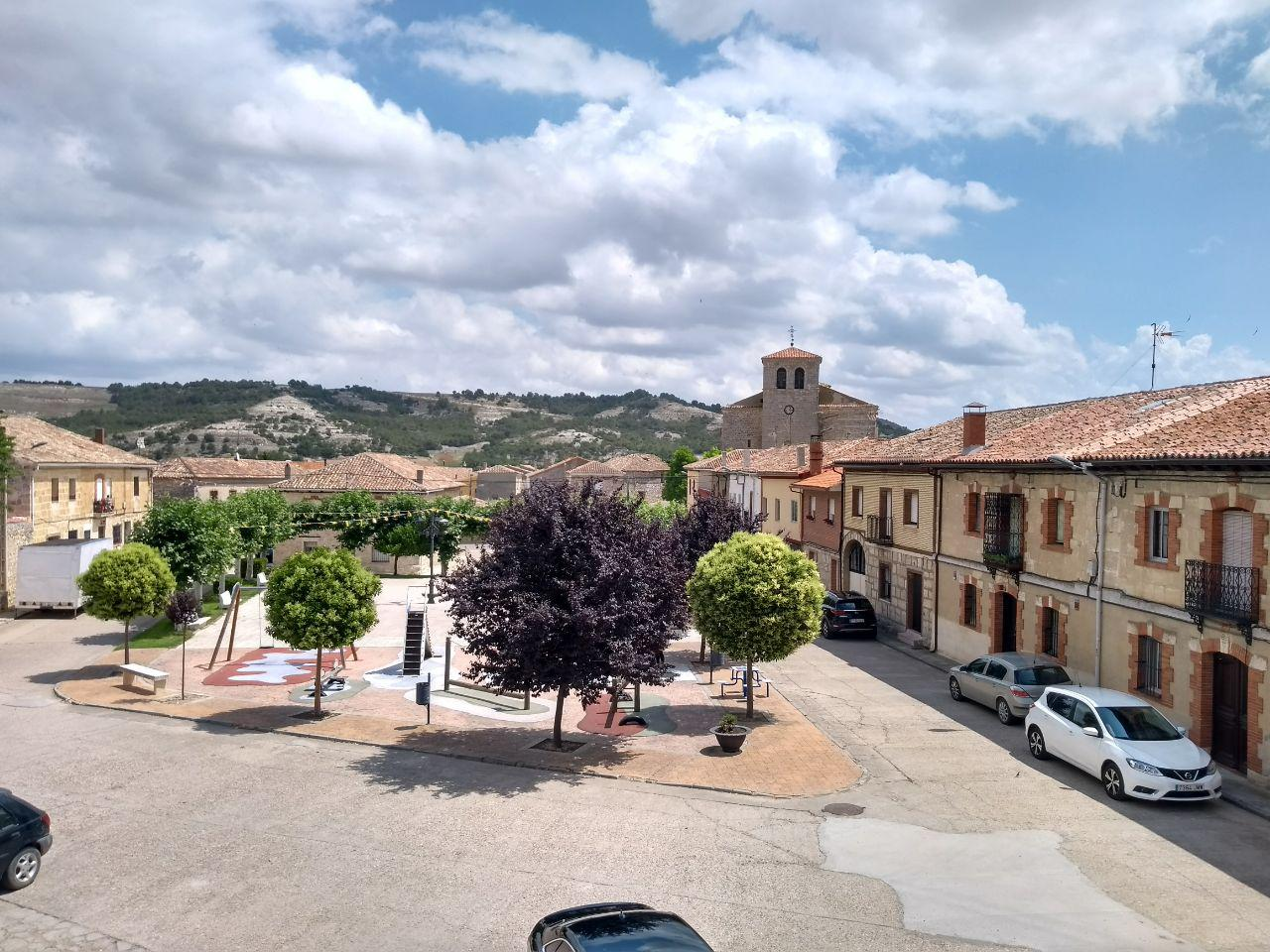

- Flag Coat of arms
- Interactive map of Villahán
- Country: Spain
- Autonomous community: Castile and León
- Province: Palencia
- Municipality: Villahán

Area
  - Total: 32 km^{2} (12 sq mi)

Population (2025-01-01)
  - Total: 96
  - Density: 3.0/km^{2} (7.8/sq mi)
- Time zone: UTC+1 (CET)
  - Summer (DST): UTC+2 (CEST)
- Website: Official website

Villahán is a municipality located in the province of Palencia, Castile and León, Spain. According to the 2004 census (INE), the municipality has a population of 124 inhabitants.
