= Province of Palencia =

Province of Spain

Province of Palencia Provincia de Palencia
- Province
- Flag Coat of arms

- Location of the Province of Palencia in Spain
- Coordinates: 42°25′N 4°30′W
- Country: Spain
- Autonomous community: Castile and León
- Capital: Palencia
- Municipalities: 191 (list)

Government
  - Type: Diputación
  - Body: Provincial Deputation of Palencia

Area
  - Total: 8,051.95 km^{2} (3,108.88 sq mi)
  - Rank: 29th in Spain
- 1.6% of Spain
- Highest elevation (Pico del Infierno): 2,538 m (8,327 ft)

Population (2025)
  - Total: 158,702
  - Rank: 47th in Spain
  - Density: 19.7098/km^{2} (51.0480/sq mi)
- 0.3% of Spain
- Time zone: UTC+1 (CET)
  - Summer (DST): UTC+2 (CEST)
- Website: Diputación de Palencia (in Spanish)

The Province of Palencia (Spanish: Provincia de Palencia) is a province of northern Spain, in the northern part of the autonomous community of Castile and León in the north of the Iberian Peninsula. Its capital is the city of Palencia. It is bordered by the provinces of León, Cantabria, Burgos, and Valladolid.

It has a population of 158,702 in an area of 8,051.95 square kilometres (3,108.88 sq mi) across its 191 municipalities.

== History ==
During the Middle Ages, the Visigoths ruled Palencia. Basílica de San Juan, the oldest Visigothic church in Spain, was built in 661 in the province's Baños de Cerrato. During the thirteenth century a university was founded in the province. It was the first university in Spain and one of the first in the world. It was later shifted to Valladolid.

== Geography ==
The province is bordered on the north by Cantabria, on the west by the province of León, on the east by the province of Burgos and on the south by the province of Valladolid. Two exclaves of the province, Cezura, and Lastrilla, are enclaves within Campoo, Cantabria, with the former being under 200 metres and the latter being just over 200 metres from the border at their closest point.

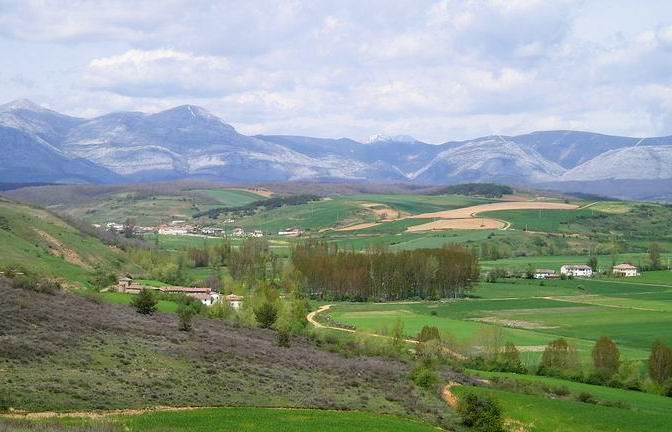
View of Vega de Riacos and Respenda de la Peña in the north of the province.

The major towns in the northern Montaña Palentina are: Guardo, a former coal mining town; Aguilar de Campoo, a historic town famous for its biscuit production and Cervera de Pisuerga, a tourist town situated at the beginning of the Ruta de los Pantanos (the Reservoirs Route) and Barruelo de Santullán, which, as the centre of the province's coal mining industry, was the largest town in the province until the 1960s. Towns in the centre of the province include: Saldaña, known for the famous mosaics at the nearby Roman villa of La Olmeda, Herrera de Pisuerga, a village known for its summer activities and Crab Festival and Carrión de los Condes, a key monastery town on the Camino de Santiago. To the south of the city of Palencia are Venta de Baños, an important railway and industrial exchange, as well as Villamuriel de Cerrato, a village to that owes its development to the Renault factory and its proximity to the capital.

In Palencia large protected areas such as the Natural Park of Fuentes Carrionas and Fuente Cobre-Montaña Palencia are located. The term historical region in Palencia, refers to those regions created in the fourteenth century, under the name merindades. Cantabrian Mountains are located in the northerns parts of the province. The 8,268 feet (2,520 metres) high Curavacas peak is located in the province. The highest point is however the Pico del Infierno, a secondary summit of Peña Prieta. The major commercial products produced in the province are barley, wheat, sugar beets, hemp, linen and woolen clothes, porcelain, leather, paper, and rugs. Food processing and metallurgy are major industries. The province has three judicial districts–one each in Palencia, Carrión de los Condes and Cervera de Pisuerga.

== Municipalities ==
The province has 191 municipalities:

- Abarca de Campos
- Abia de las Torres
- Aguilar de Campoo
- Alar del Rey
- Alba de Cerrato
- Amayuelas de Arriba
- Ampudia
- Amusco
- Antigüedad
- Arconada
- Astudillo
- Autilla del Pino
- Autillo de Campos
- Ayuela
- Baltanás
- Baquerín de Campos
- Bárcena de Campos
- Barruelo de Santullán
- Báscones de Ojeda
- Becerril de Campos
- Belmonte de Campos
- Berzosilla
- Boada de Campos
- Boadilla de Rioseco
- Boadilla del Camino
- Brañosera
- Buenavista de Valdavia
- Bustillo de la Vega
- Bustillo del Páramo de Carrión
- Calahorra de Boedo
- Calzada de los Molinos
- Capillas
- Cardeñosa de Volpejera
- Carrión de los Condes
- Castil de Vela
- Castrejón de la Peña
- Castrillo de Don Juan
- Castrillo de Onielo
- Castrillo de Villavega
- Castromocho
- Cervatos de la Cueza
- Cervera de Pisuerga
- Cevico de la Torre
- Cevico Navero
- Cisneros
- Cobos de Cerrato
- Collazos de Boedo
- Congosto de Valdavia
- Cordovilla la Real
- Cubillas de Cerrato
- Dehesa de Montejo
- Dehesa de Romanos
- Dueñas
- Espinosa de Cerrato
- Espinosa de Villagonzalo
- Frechilla
- Fresno del Río
- Frómista
- Fuentes de Nava
- Fuentes de Valdepero
- Grijota
- Guardo
- Guaza de Campos
- Hérmedes de Cerrato
- Herrera de Pisuerga
- Herrera de Valdecañas
- Hontoria de Cerrato
- Hornillos de Cerrato
- Husillos
- Itero de la Vega
- La Pernía
- La Puebla de Valdavia
- La Serna
- La Vid de Ojeda
- Lagartos
- Lantadilla
- Ledigos
- Loma de Ucieza
- Lomas
- Magaz de Pisuerga
- Manquillos
- Mantinos
- Marcilla de Campos
- Mazariegos
- Mazuecos de Valdeginate
- Melgar de Yuso
- Meneses de Campos
- Micieces de Ojeda
- Monzón de Campos
- Moratinos
- Mudá
- Nogal de las Huertas
- Olea de Boedo
- Olmos de Ojeda
- Osornillo
- Osorno la Mayor
- Palencia
- Palenzuela
- Páramo de Boedo
- Paredes de Nava
- Payo de Ojeda
- Pedraza de Campos
- Pedrosa de la Vega
- Perales
- Piña de Campos
- Pino del Río
- Población de Arroyo
- Población de Campos
- Población de Cerrato
- Polentinos
- Pomar de Valdivia
- Poza de la Vega
- Pozo de Urama
- Prádanos de Ojeda
- Quintana del Puente
- Quintanilla de Onsoña
- Reinoso de Cerrato
- Renedo de la Vega
- Requena de Campos
- Respenda de la Peña
- Revenga de Campos
- Revilla de Collazos
- Ribas de Campos
- Riberos de la Cueza
- Saldaña
- Salinas de Pisuerga
- San Cebrián de Campos
- San Cebrián de Mudá
- San Cristóbal de Boedo
- San Mamés de Campos
- San Román de la Cuba
- Santa Cecilia del Alcor
- Santa Cruz de Boedo
- Santervás de la Vega
- Santibáñez de Ecla
- Santibáñez de la Peña
- Santoyo
- Soto de Cerrato
- Sotobañado y Priorato
- Tabanera de Cerrato
- Tabanera de Valdavia
- Támara de Campos
- Tariego de Cerrato
- Torquemada
- Torremormojón
- Triollo
- Valbuena de Pisuerga
- Valde-Ucieza
- Valdeolmillos
- Valderrábano
- Valle de Cerrato
- Valle del Retortillo
- Velilla del Río Carrión
- Venta de Baños
- Vertavillo
- Villabasta de Valdavia
- Villacidaler
- Villaconancio
- Villada
- Villaeles de Valdavia
- Villahán
- Villaherreros
- Villalaco
- Villalba de Guardo
- Villalcázar de Sirga
- Villalcón
- Villalobón
- Villaluenga de la Vega
- Villamartín de Campos
- Villamediana
- Villameriel
- Villamoronta
- Villamuera de la Cueza
- Villamuriel de Cerrato
- Villanueva del Rebollar
- Villanuño de Valdavia
- Villaprovedo
- Villarmentero de Campos
- Villarrabé
- Villarramiel
- Villasarracino
- Villasila de Valdavia
- Villaturde
- Villaumbrales
- Villaviudas
- Villerías de Campos
- Villodre
- Villodrigo
- Villoldo
- Villota del Páramo
- Villovieco

== Demographics ==
As of 2025, the population is 158,702, of which 49.7% are male, and 50.3% are female. Minors make up 13.3% of the population, and seniors make up 28.2%.

The majority of the province is very sparsely populated and has lost a significant proportion of its population since Francoist times due to rural to urban migration.

Historical population

Year	Pop.	±%
1842	149,198	—
1857	185,970	+24.6%
1877	180,128	−3.1%
1887	189,431	+5.2%
1900	192,246	+1.5%
1910	197,680	+2.8%
1920	195,914	−0.9%
1930	212,092	+8.3%
1940	222,662	+5.0%

Year	Pop.	±%
1950	236,008	+6.0%
1960	237,426	+0.6%
1970	201,532	−15.1%
1981	188,479	−6.5%
1991	185,479	−1.6%
2001	174,143	−6.1%
2011	170,513	−2.1%
2021	159,146	−6.7%

Source: INE

=== Immigration ===
As of 2025, immigrants make up 9.6% of the population. The 5 largest foreign countries of birth are Morocco, Colombia, Peru, Venezuela, and Romania.

== See also ==
- The Arauz Formation is situated in Palencia (Devonian of Spain).
- El Golobar
- Siege of Pallantia
