= Palenzuela =

Coordinates: 42°06′N 4°08′W

- Municipality
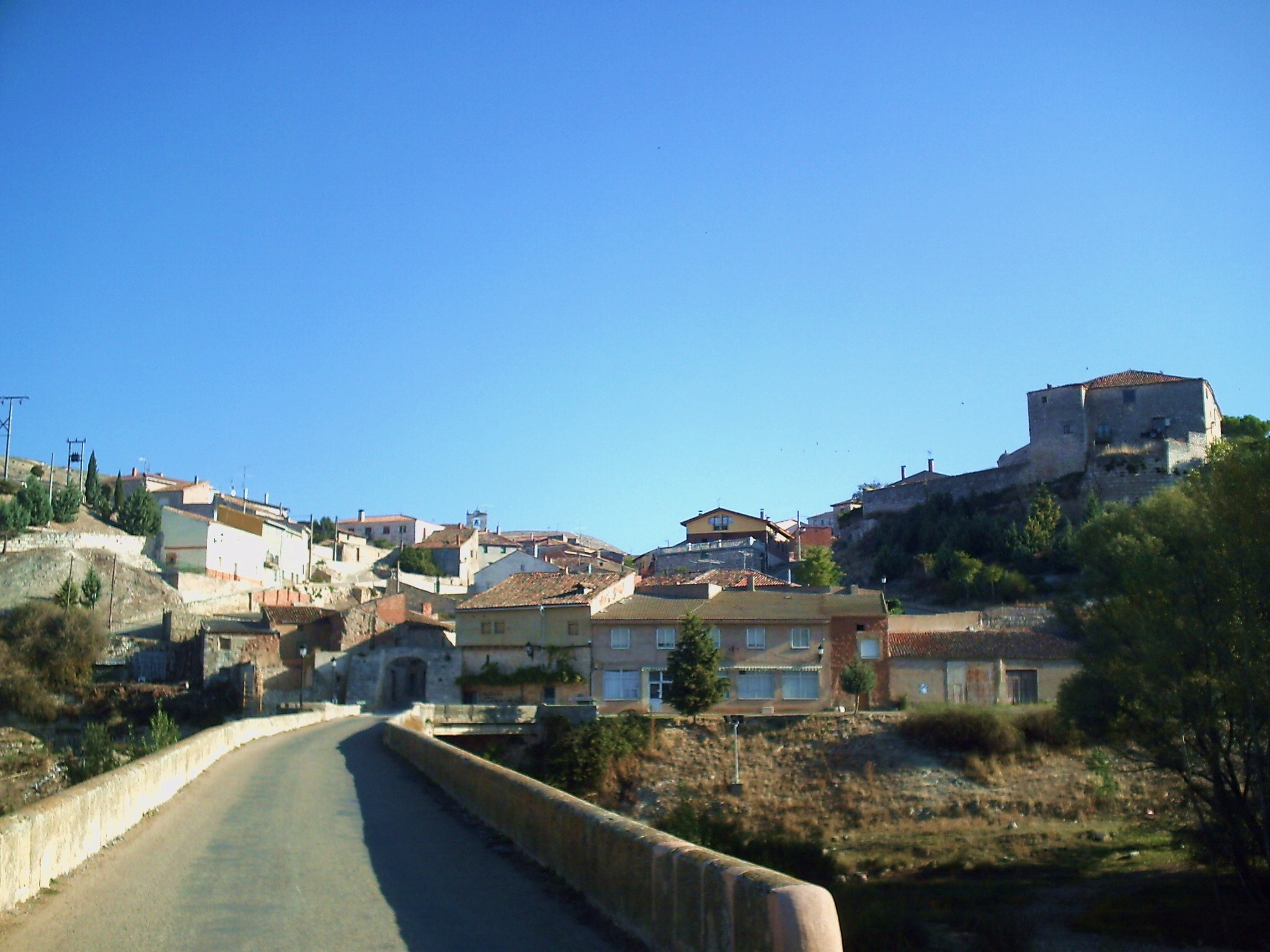

- Coat of arms
- Interactive map of Palenzuela
- Country: Spain
- Autonomous community: Castile and León
- Province: Palencia
- Municipality: Palenzuela

Area
  - Total: 75.72 km^{2} (29.24 sq mi)
- Elevation: 802 m (2,631 ft)

Population (2025-01-01)
  - Total: 212
  - Density: 2.80/km^{2} (7.25/sq mi)
- Time zone: UTC+1 (CET)
  - Summer (DST): UTC+2 (CEST)
- Website: Official website

Palenzuela is a municipality located in the province of Palencia, Castile and León, Spain. According to the 2004 census (INE), the municipality had a population of 278 inhabitants. The town was an important banking region for the Sephardic noble family the Barons of Palenzuela Vienveniste Ha Levi Ha Kahana. They were closely linked to Catherine of Lancaster of Castile and during the Habsburg empire to Charles V, Ferdinand II, and Philip II—Habsburg rulers of Spain and the Holy Roman Empire.
