= Canal de Castilla =

Canal in Castile and León, Spain

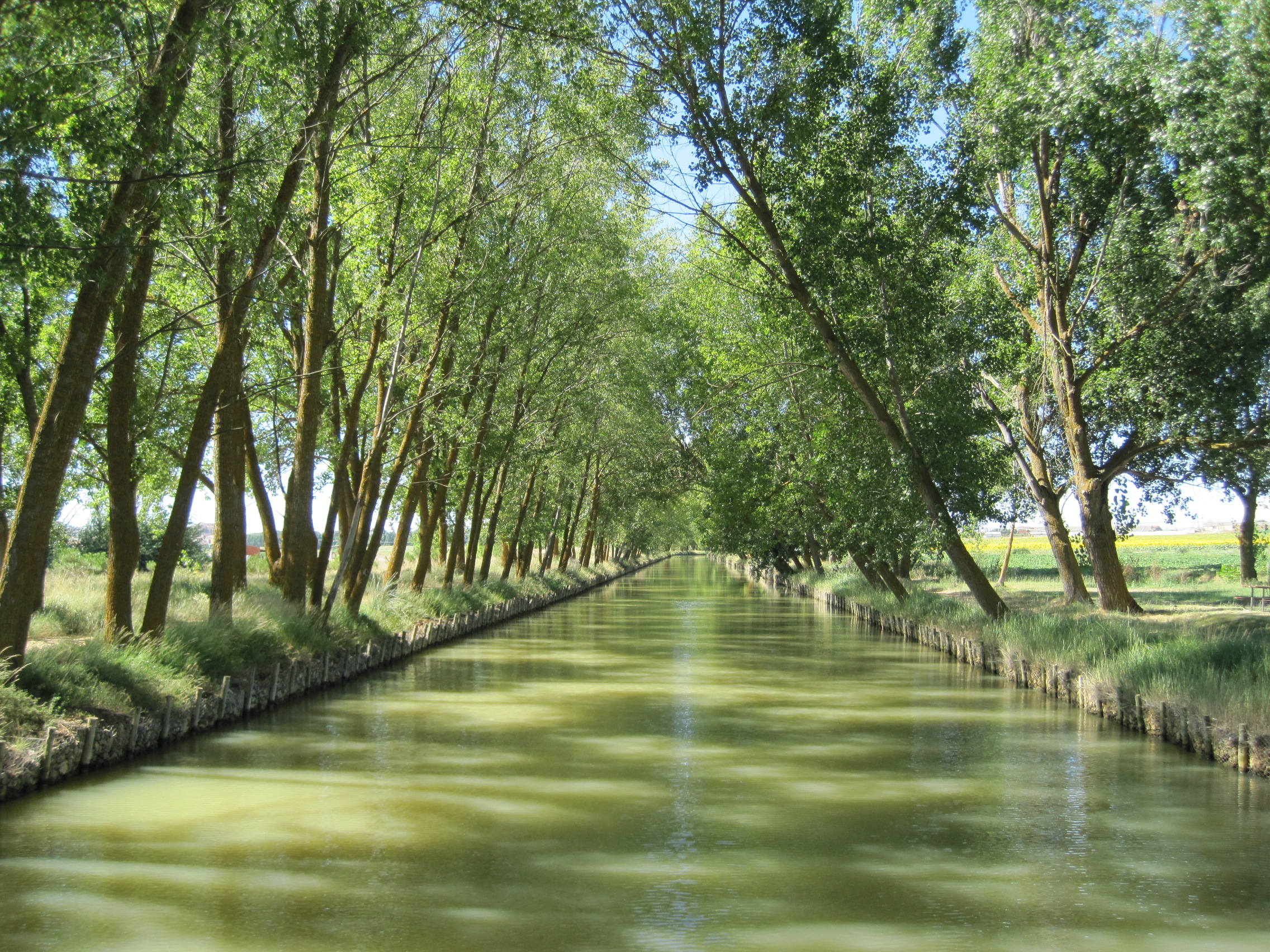
- Canal de Castilla in Medina de Rioseco
- Interactive map of Canal de Castilla
- Location: Castile and León (Burgos, Palencia, Valladolid)
- Country: Spain
- Coordinates: 41.749444°N 4.646943°W

Specifications
- Length: 207 km (129 miles)

History
- Construction began: 1753
- Date of first use: December 14, 1849; 176 years ago
- Date completed: 1849

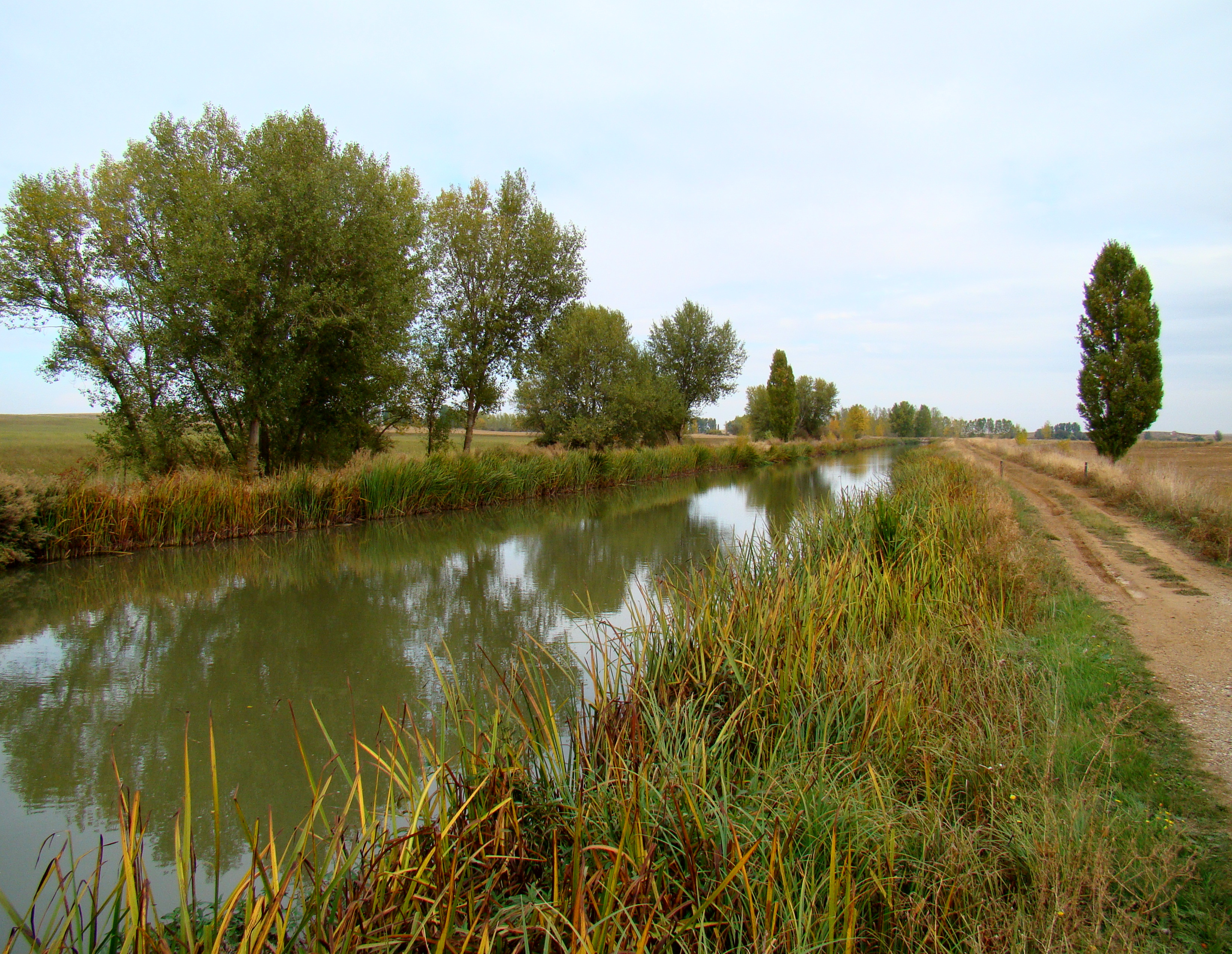
Canal of Castile as it flows east of Fromista

The Canal of Castile (Canal de Castilla in Spanish) is a canal in the north of Spain. Constructed between the last half of the 18th century and the first half of the 19th century, it was conceived to facilitate the transportation of wheat from Castille to the ports in the Bay of Biscay for export. The canal runs 207 km through the provinces of Burgos, Palencia and Valladolid, in the Autonomous Community of Castile and León.

The canal was mostly used between 1850 and 1870 but competition with railways saw its use change to irrigation and for powering mills, in the latter part of the 19th century. Navigation ceased in 1959 with the closure of the locks.

Parts of the canal are still in use, and although navigation is limited to tourism, the canal is used to irrigate 23,000 hectares in 48 municipalities. The canal is now protected by a heritage listing, having been declared Bien de interés cultural in 1991.

== History ==
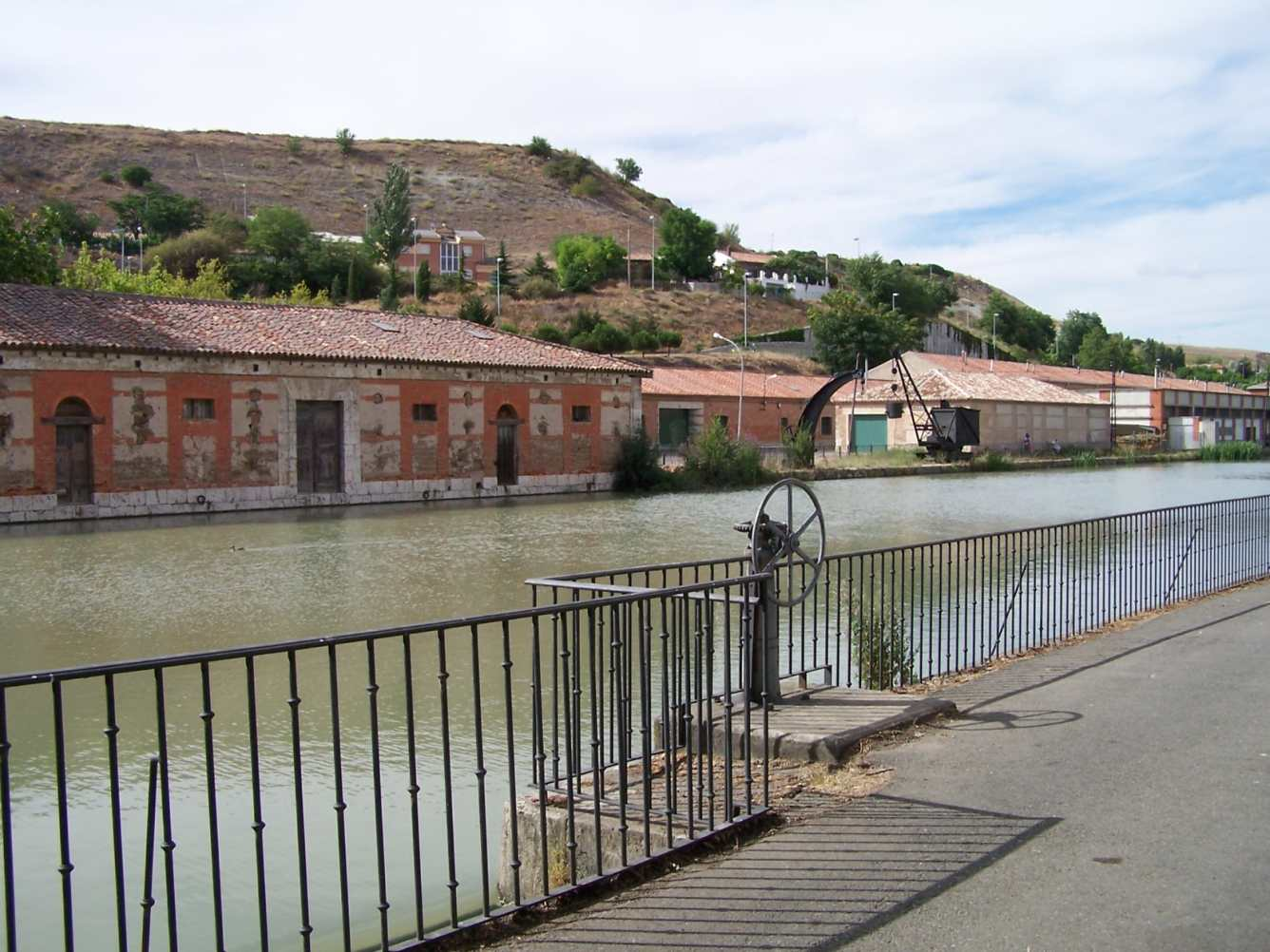
Docks in Valladolid

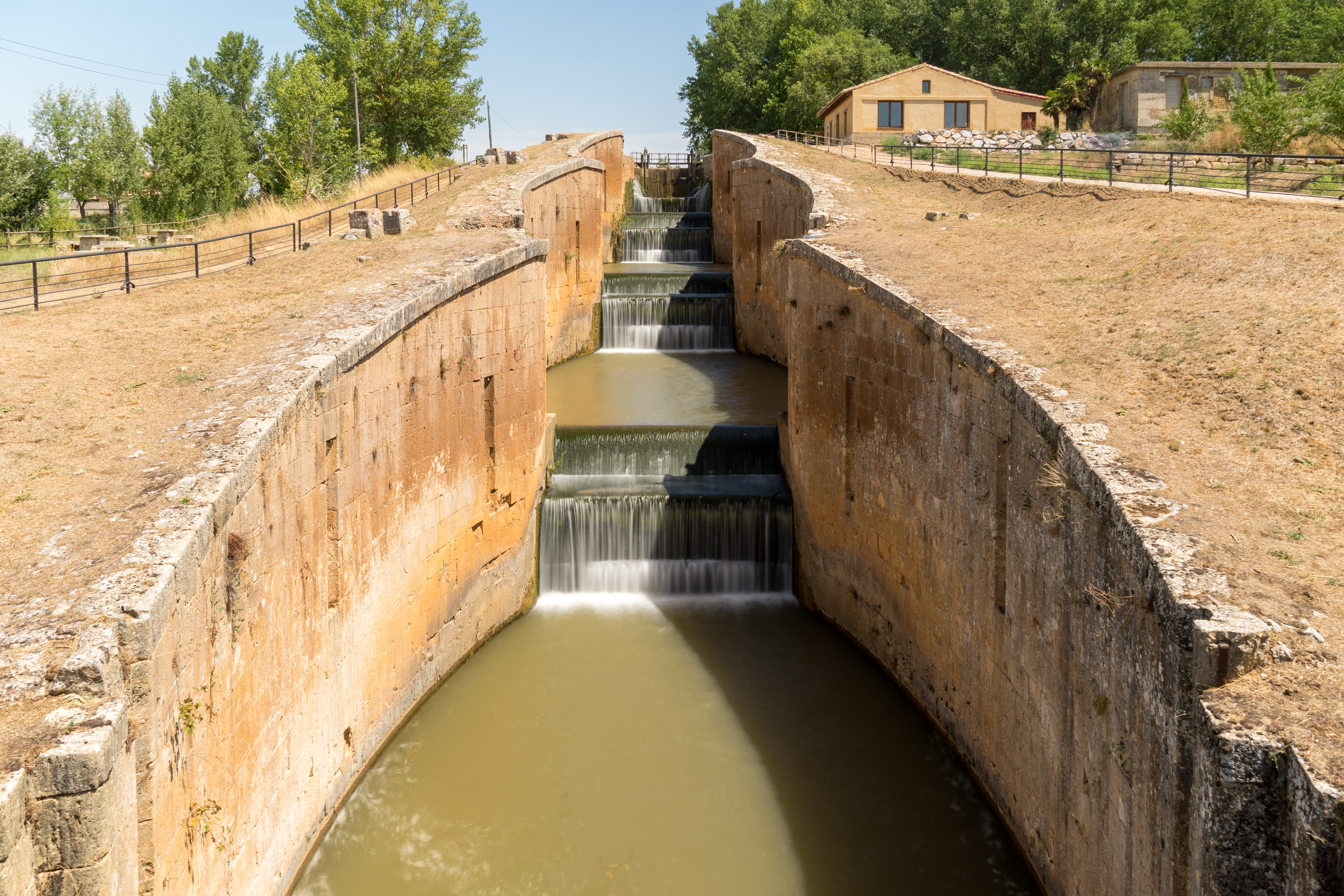
Locks 17, 18, 19 y 20, in Frómista

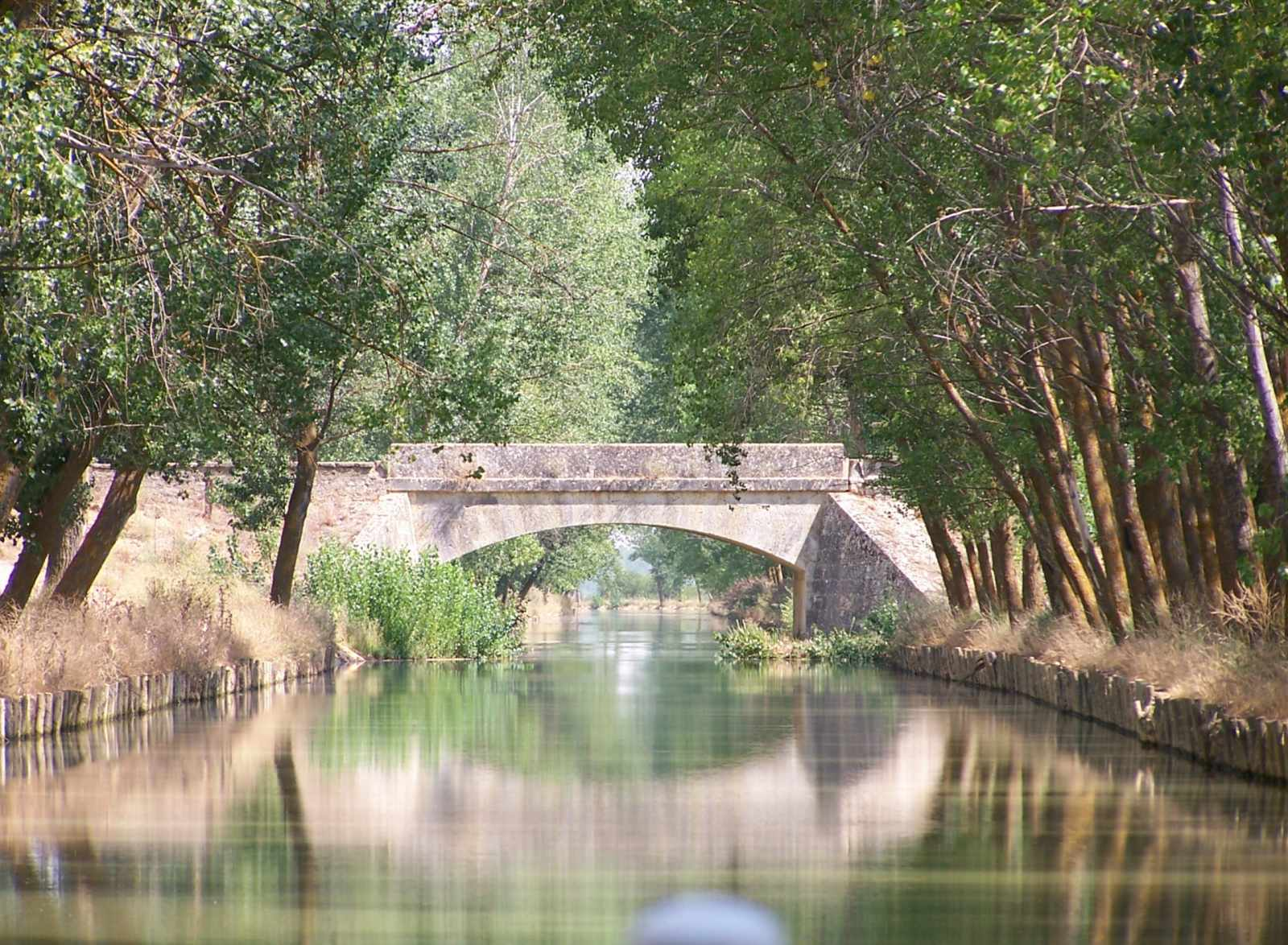
Stone Bridge at Medina de Rioseco

The canal was planned by the Marques de la Ensenada during Fernando VI's reign in the late 18th century. Its purpose was to boost trade by allowing Tierra de Campos' wheat grain production to be transported from Castile to the northern harbour of Santander and to other markets from there; vice versa, the canal was also meant to facilitate the inflow of products from the Spanish colonies into Castile.

The Spanish War of Independence, budgetary constraints and the difficult passage through the Cantabrian Mountains hampered and eventually reduced the initial plan of a 400 km canal, so the canal never reached the Bay of Biscay as initially planned. Overall, its construction took almost 100 years (from 1753 to 1849) and was eventually halted when railroads were built in northern Spain in the nineteenth century, making the project redundant.

The canal was most used during the 1850-1870 period, when up to 400 barges plied the canal towed by beasts of burden. Later on, the canal evolved into the spine of a huge irrigation system due to its relative inefficiency and slowliness vs. railfreight as a means of transport. The locks on the canal were decommissioned in the twentieth century.

== The Canal today ==
The canal has the form of an inverted 'Y' in layout, with two southern branches beginning in (Valladolid and Medina de Rioseco (the Southern Branch and Campos Branch respectively, joining into a single canal (the Northern Branch) at the town of Alar del Rey (Palencia) stretching 207 km (129 mi).

There is a network of locks, flour mills, warehouses, and docks of historical interest and the whole canal is popular for hiking.

== Ecology ==
The countryside crossed by the canal is of interest for its birdlife. In the Tierra de Campos two large Special Protection Areas (La Nava-Campos Norte and La Nava-Campos Sur) have been designated. These are notable for birds such as great bustards (Otis tarda), residents of dryland farming areas (sometimes described as "steppes") which are typical of the region. The canal, on the other hand, provides valuable habitats for wetland birds such as the bittern (Botaurus stellaris) and the aquatic warbler (Acrocephalus paludicola).

The canal lends its name to two Sites of Community Importance alongside the watercourse:

- a wooded stretch of the canal near Osorno la Mayor protected as Canal de Castilla (150 ha).
- a number of wetlands (some very small) protected as Lagunas del Canal de Castilla (71 ha). This multi-site protected area has been designated as a Special Area of Conservation and as a Special Protection Area.

In 2006-10 the European Union's Life Programme funded restoration of wetlands in the province of Palencia with the aim of improving the canal's contribution to biodiversity. Birds of interest to the project include:

- the aquatic warbler (Acrocephalus paludicola). This species, Europe's most endangered songbird, uses Spain as a migration route.
- the bittern (Botaurus stellaris). This species is close to disappearing in Spain.

The improvements included facilities for bird-watching: two observatories were positioned close to two of the wetlands with the greatest ornithological interest along the Canal of Castile: the Venta de Valdemudo (Becerril de Campos) and the Valdemorco (Boadilla del Camino) lagoons. These observatories complemented one already existing (in Toja de las Ribas, Ribas de Campos) before the LIFE project.

== Municipalities crossed over by Canal ==
Ordered North to South, East to West.

=== Northern Branch ===
==== Palencia Province ====
- Alar del Rey
- San Quirce de Río Pisuerga
- Herrera de Pisuerga
- Ventosa de Pisuerga
- Castrillo de Riopisuerga
- Olmos de Pisuerga
- Naveros de Pisuerga

==== Burgos Province ====
- San Llorente de la Vega
- Melgar de Fernamental

==== Palencia Province ====
- Osorno la Mayor
- Santillana de Campos
- Las Cabañas de Castilla
- Lantadilla
- Requena de Campos
- Boadilla del Camino
- Frómista
- Piña de Campos
- Amusco
- Amayuelas de Abajo
- Ribas de Campos.

=== Campos Branch ===
==== Palencia Province ====
- Ribas de Campos
- Becerril de Campos
- Husillos
- Villaumbrales
- Becerril de Campos
- Paredes de Nava
- Fuentes de Nava
- Autillo de Campos
- Abarca
- Castromocho
- Capillas
- Castil de Vela
- Belmonte de Campos

==== Valladolid Province ====
- Tamariz de Campos
- Villanueva de San Mancio
- Medina de Rioseco

=== Southern Branch ===
==== Palencia Province ====
- Grijota
- Palencia
- Villamuriel de Cerrato
- Dueñas

==== Valladolid Province ====
- Cubillas de Santa Marta
- Trigueros del Valle
- Corcos del Valle
- Cabezón de Pisuerga
- Cigales
- Valladolid

== See also ==
- Esclusas y molino de Casablanca

== Bibliography ==
- El Canal de Castilla. Madrid: Castile and León Community Government. 1986. OCLC 83206828. Legal Deposit M-8.751-1986.
