= Cubillas =

Cubillas may refer to:

- Cubillas de Cerrato, a municipality in the province of Palencia, Castile and León, Spain
- Cubillas de los Oteros, a municipality in the province of León, Castile and León, Spain
- Cubillas de Rueda, a municipality in the province of León, Castile and León, Spain
- Cubillas de Santa Marta, a municipality in the province of Valladolid, Castile and León, Spain
- Joel Cubillas (born 1958), a former football defender
- Teófilo Cubillas (born 1949), a Peruvian former footballer
