= Requena de Campos =

Coordinates: 42°19′N 4°20′W

- municipality
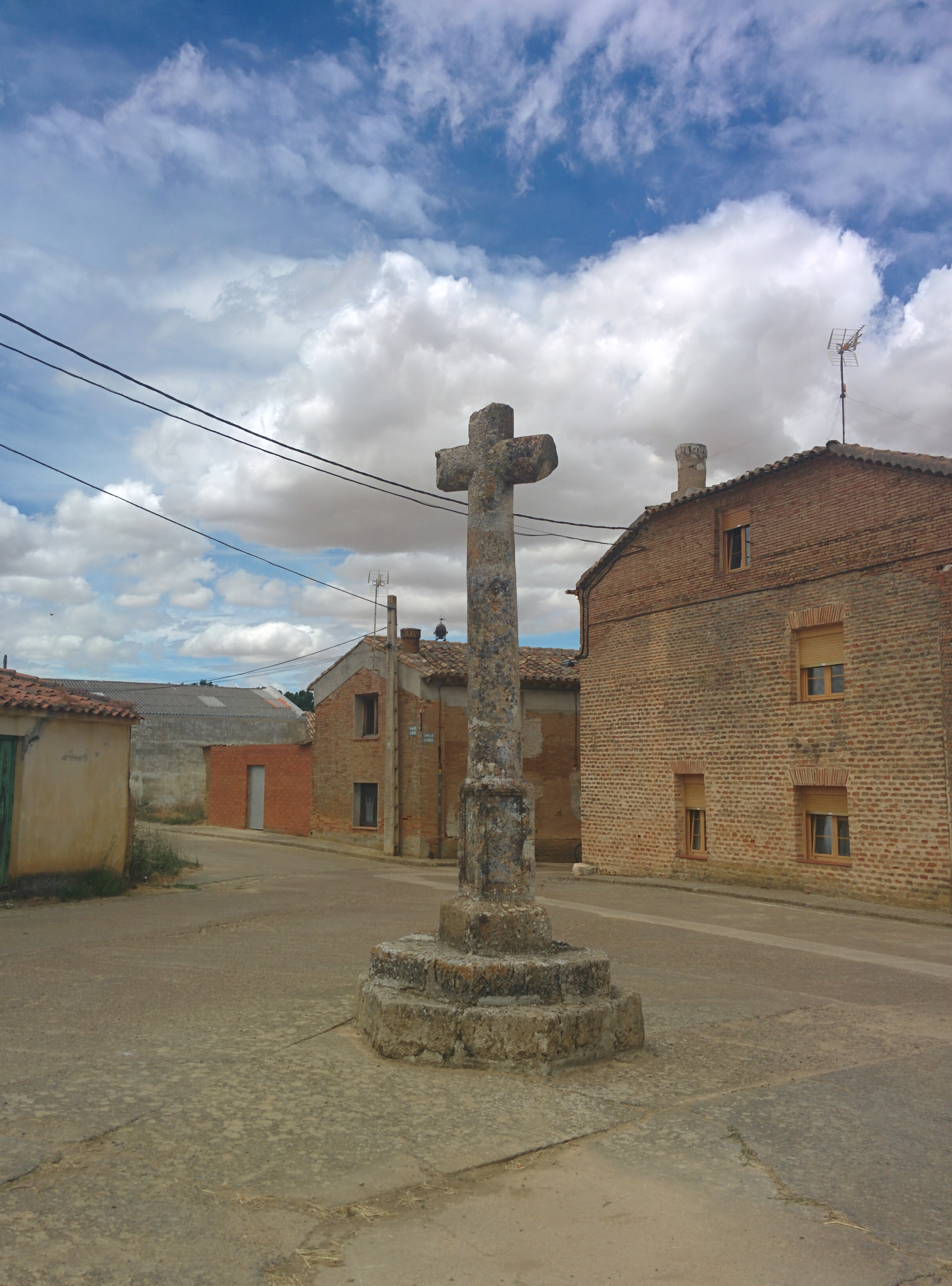

- Coat of arms
- Interactive map of Requena de Campos
- Country: Spain
- Autonomous community: Castile and León
- Province: Palencia

Area
  - Total: 13.18 km^{2} (5.09 sq mi)
- Elevation: 790 m (2,590 ft)

Population (2025-01-01)
  - Total: 27
  - Density: 2.0/km^{2} (5.3/sq mi)
- Time zone: UTC+1 (CET)
  - Summer (DST): UTC+2 (CEST)
- Website: Official website

Requena de Campos is a municipality and locality located in the province of Palencia, Castile and León, Spain. According to the 2025 census (INE), the municipality had a population of 27 inhabitants. Crossed by the Canal de Castilla and Camino de Santiago, it forms part of Tierra de Campos. In this municipality, the Canal de Castilla changes its slope from the Pisuerga to the Carrión. The local economy is based on the cultivation of cereals and sheep. The soil is claylike and tough.

== History ==
The village was acquired by Gómez Manrique, First Lord of Requena, Adelantado mayor of Castile and illegitimate son of Pedro Manrique de Lara, lord of Treviño, and his wife Sancha de Rojas y Guevara, lady of Santa Gadea del Cid. The estate was inherited by one of their daughters, Elvira Manrique de Lara, wife of Juan Rodríguez de Rojas, Lord of Poza de la Sal.

At the end of the 15th century and the start of the 16th, it belonged to Gómez de Rojas and his wife, Isabel de Carvajal, whose son the prelate Antonio de Rojas Manrique continued the construction of the parish church.

In March of 1925, Arbor Day was celebrated with the planting of 100 black poplars.

In 2013, the head of the county of Requena was María del Carmen Eugenia Fitz-James Stuart y Gómez.

The impoverishment of the village has nothing to do with the richness of its history and heritage. In the 14th century, there were four priests and five other clerics for its church of San Miguel and its hermitage of Santa Marina.

Its parish archive in the Bishopric of Palencia contains papal bulls from Pope Clement VIII (1603), Pope Leo X (1517), and one from 1414 issued by Antipope Benedict XIII, which grants indulgences to the Church of Requena.

== Demographics ==
According to the 2025 census (INE), the municipality has a population of 27 people.

== Heritage ==
- Parish church
- Processional cross, located in the provincial museum
- Adobe houses
- Bridge over the Canal de Castilla (1781-1791) between the bridge in Las Cabañas de Castilla and lock 16 in Boadilla del Camino
- Aqueduct, bridge, and canal of Requena, integral parts of the Canal de Castilla
- Facades of houses with the coats of arms González and Herreros
- Circular or square dovecote
- Camino Lebaniego Castellano

=== Parish church ===
The parish church from the 16th century, consecrated to San Miguel, was constructed by mandate of Antonio de Rojas when he was Bishop of Granada, around the year 1520. The tower of this temple features two coats of arms of bishop Rojas on the corners. The current altarpiece is from the 18th century.

The original altarpiece, dedicated to San Juan Bautista, was commissioned by Antonio de Rojas Manrique, and its location is unknown after being put up for sale in Barcelona in 1969. Its author may have been Bartolomé de Castro, who, for an ornamental detail in the composition of the banquet of Herodias, was inspired by an engraving of Marcantonio Raimondi based on a drawing of Venus and Cupid by Raphael.

In his 1948 book Partidos de Carrión de los Condes y Frechilla (Parties of Carrión de los Condes and Frechilla), Ramón Revilla Vielva cites a 15th-century Gothic altarpiece.

Parts of an old altarpiece were used to form part of the Piedad altarpiece (1596) in San Cebrián de Campos.

There is a silver cross from the first third of the 15th century carved by Burgalés silversmith Rodrigo Alfonso.

There is also a processional Byzantine cross from the 13th century, originally enameled. Specialists compare it to the processional cross of Villavelayo. It was exhibited in the International Exhibition of Barcelona in 1901 and in Las Edades del Hombre in Palencia in 1999. It is now in the diocesan museum of Palencia.

=== Church tower clock ===
The church tower clock was crafted by Moisés Diez, an important Palentino clockmaker and bell-maker with international work, and donated by D. Baltasar González on July 6th, 1908. Its main characteristic was a tolling for the dead at midnight and at noon, commemorating a relative of the donor who had passed away at the time. A similar clock can be found in Cózar.
