= Santa Marta (disambiguation) =

Santa Marta, the Italian-, Portuguese-, and Spanish-language name of the Biblical Martha, is a moderately common toponym in parts of the world where those tongues are or were spoken. There are, additionally, both real and fictional communities sharing the name.

== Real-world entities ==
- Brazil
  - Favela Santa Marta, a favela located in Rio de Janeiro
- Colombia
  - Santa Marta, Magdalena department
    - Sierra Nevada de Santa Marta
- Mexico
  - Santa Marta metro station, a station on the Mexico City Metro
  - Santa Marta (Cablebús), an air lift station in Mexico City
- Panama
  - Santa Marta, Panama
- Portugal
  - Santa Marta de Penaguião
  - Santa Marta Lighthouse (Cascais)
- Spain
  - Santa Marta, Badajoz, a municipality in the province of Badajoz, Extremadura
  - Santa Marta del Cerro, a municipality in the province of Segovia, Castile and León
  - Santa Marta de Tormes, a municipality in the province of Salamanca, Castile and León
    - UD Santa Marta, a Spanish football team based in Santa Marta de Tormes
  - Santa Marta de Magasca, a municipality in the province of Cáceres, Extremadura
  - Cubillas de Santa Marta, a municipality in the province of Valladolid, Castile and León
- United States
  - Santa Marta, an early name for Key Biscayne in Florida
- Vatican City
  - Casa Santa Marta, a building, current residence of the pope
- Venezuela
  - Santa Marta (baseball club), La Guaira, Vargas, 1954–1955

== Fictional entities ==
- United States
  - Santa Marta (comics): a fictional city destroyed by DC Comics supervillain Major Disaster
