= San Quirce de Riopisuerga =

- locality
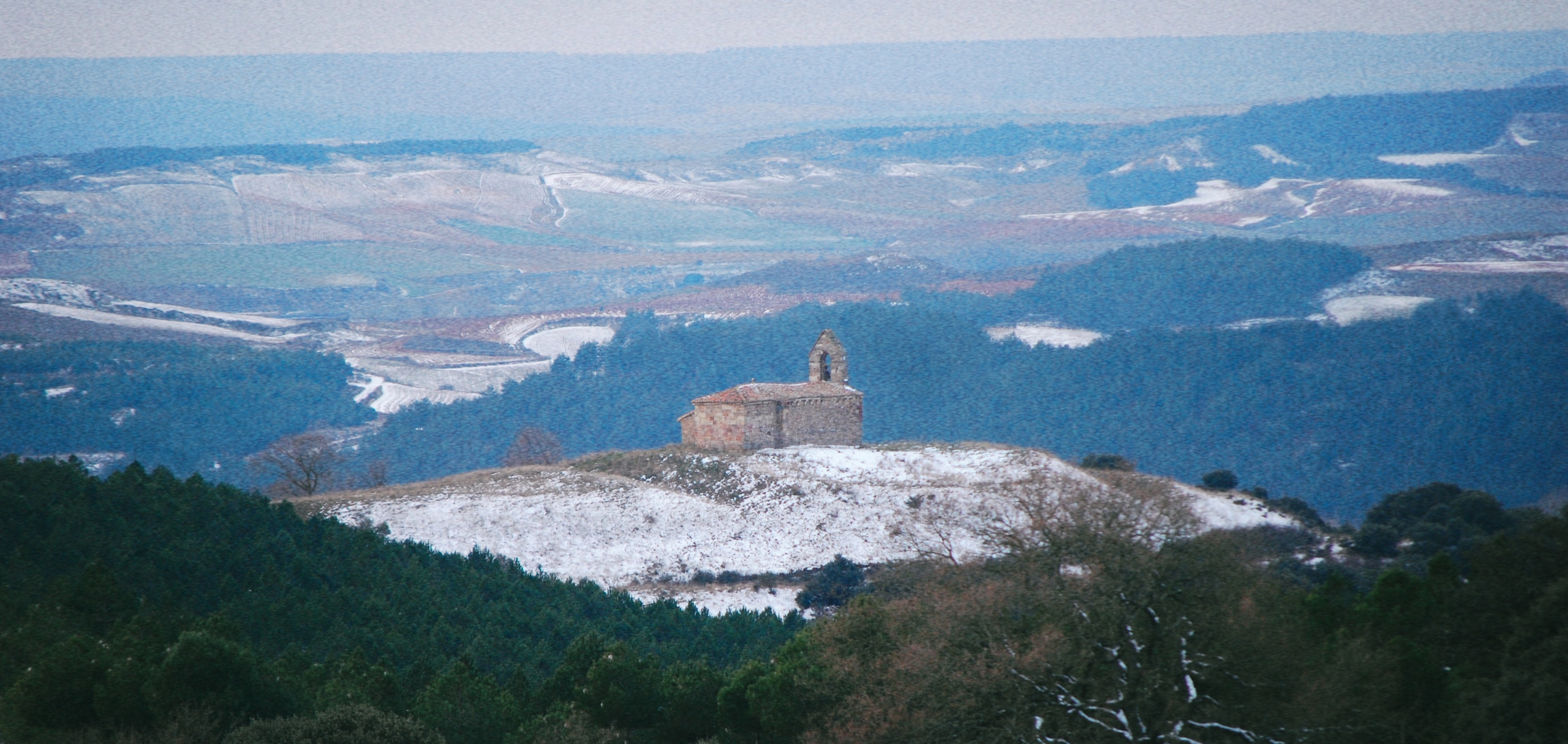
- View of the Ermita del Cristo Santo, 1982
- Interactive map of San Quirce de Riopisuerga
- Coordinates: 42°37′46″N 4°18′07″W
- Country: Spain
- Autonomous community: Castile and León
- Province: Palencia
- Municipality: Alar del Rey
- Time zone: UTC+1 (CET)
  - Summer (DST): UTC+2 (CEST)

San Quirce de Riopisuerga is a small locality situated in the foothills of the Cantabrian Mountains, north of the province of Palencia, Castile and León, Spain. According to the 2020 census (INE), the locality has a population of 51 inhabitants.

== General data ==
In 2006, it had 115 inhabitants, located 3 km south of the capital of the municipality, Alar del Rey, next to the Canal de Castilla, highway N-611 and railway from Venta de Baños to Santander.

== History ==
San Quirce was part of Cuevas de Amaya in Villadiego, one of the fourteen places that formed the Province of Burgos. During the period between 1785 and 1833, in the Census of Floridablanca, it was jurisdictional dominion of the Dukes of Frías. The town's coat of arms includes a party from the House of Velasco, who held the dukedom.

According to Roberto Gordaliza Aparicio, it is known that the town is named for the first time in 1181 by Alfonso VIII: "in sancto Quirico". Quirce is a form derived from Saint Cyricus and comes from the Latin "sancti Chirici" and this one from the Greek "kirios", sir, as regards this saint. Another form of the name is Ciriaco.

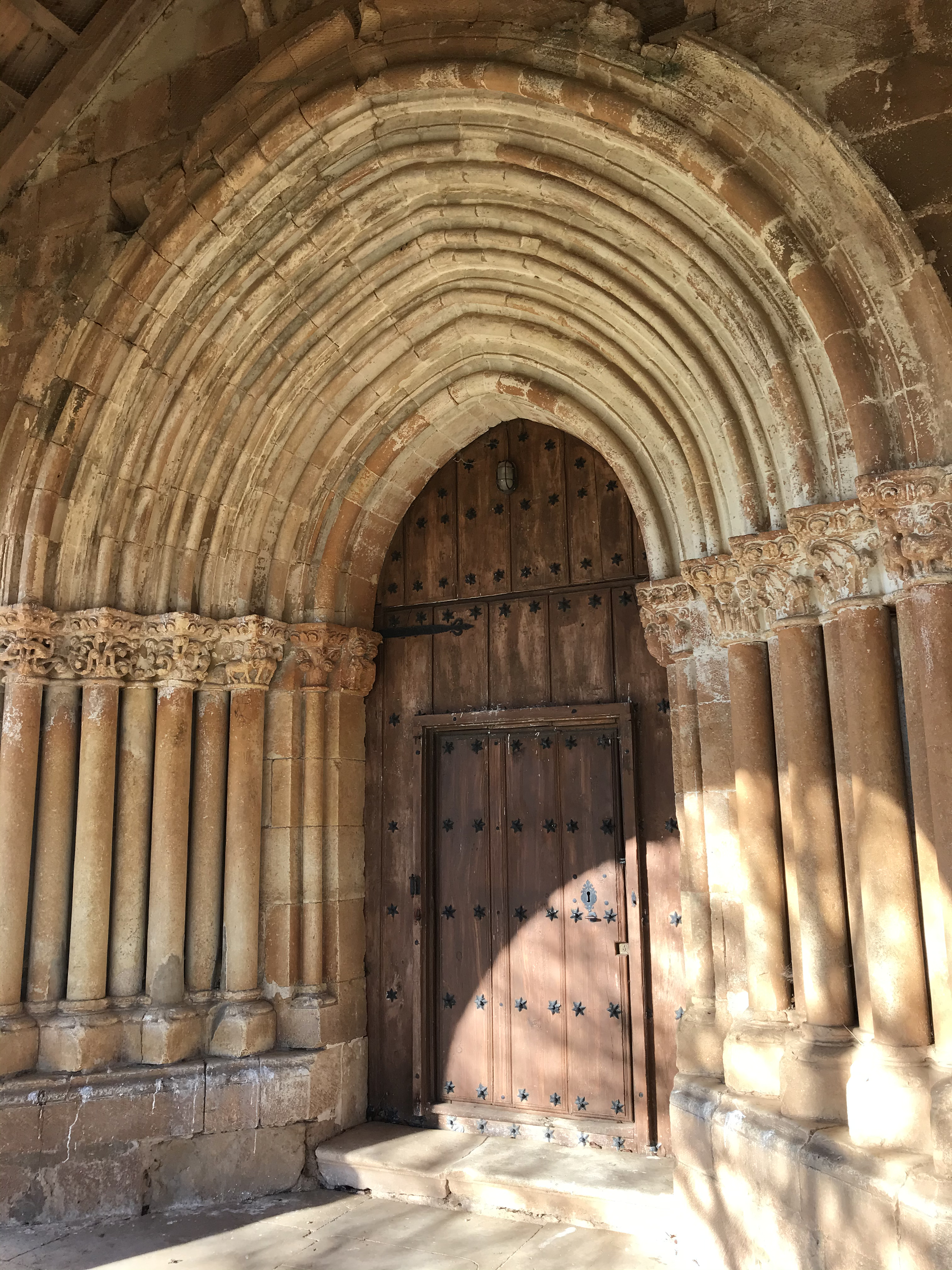
Gothic entrance of the Church of the archangel Saint Michael

Like many towns, San Quirce is located on or near river terraces. The region was already occupied in the Middle Pleistocene, as evidenced by the excavations carried out in "Los Llanos". Various materials were found there: flakes, remains of carvings; some carved edges and rough products. Everything suggests that on the aforementioned hill there was a Celtiberian fortress that was the point of confluence of the Cantabrian, Vaccaei and Turmodigi peoples.

The settlement began under the protection of the monastery of Saints Cyricus and Julitta, possibly in the same place where it is located today. In 1181 it was donated by Alfonso VIII to Monastery of Santa María la Real in Aguilar de Campoo. This priory was dependant of the abbey of Santa María de Sotovellanos. Remains of the house and walls of the garden are still preserved, as well as the Romanesque entrance to the current temple of San Miguel.

In the Cadastral registration census of 1842, San Quirce had 77 households and 310 neighbors, but as of 2018 it had 57.

The locality officially disappeared in 1973 because it was integrated into the municipalities of Alar del Rey, passing from the province of Burgos to the province of Palencia.

== Demographics ==
Demographic evolution
1842	1857	1860	1877	1887	1897	1900	1910	1920	1930	1940	1950	1960	1970
310	499	493	460	466	480	503	490	526	581	594	683	604	406

== See also ==
- Cantabrian Mountains

== Bibliography ==
- Gordaliza Aparicio, Roberto (2003). Boedo-Ojeda y Ribera Apuntes de Historia, Arte y Toponimia. F.Roberto Gordaliza y Miguel A.Ortiz Nozal. ISBN 84-921-5751-8.
