= Tagarrosa =

- Village
- Location within Province of Burgos Location within Castile and León Location within Spain
- Coordinates: 42°29′27″N 4°12′32″W
- Country: Spain
- Autonomous community: Castile and León
- Province: Province of Burgos
- Municipality: Melgar de Fernamental
- Elevation: 847 m (2,779 ft)

Population
  - Total: 10

Tagarrosa is a hamlet located in the municipality of Melgar de Fernamental, in Burgos province, Castile and León, Spain. As of 2020, it has a population of 10.

== Geography ==
Tagarrosa is located 58km west-northwest of Burgos.
