= Ribas de Campos =

Coordinates: 42°09′N 4°31′W

- municipality
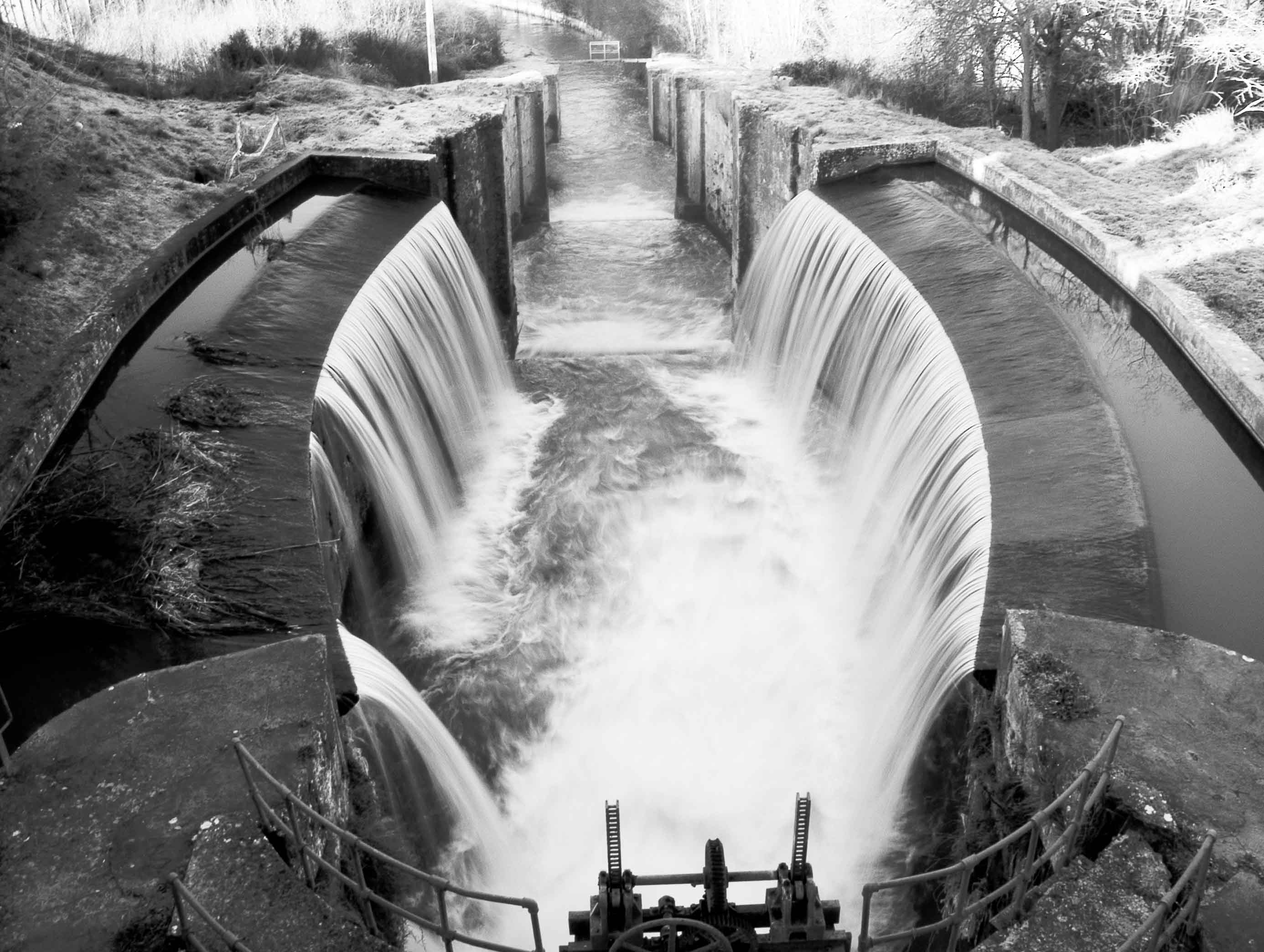

- Flag Coat of arms
- Interactive map of Ribas de Campos
- Country: Spain
- Autonomous community: Castile and León
- Province: Palencia

Area
  - Total: 15 km^{2} (5.8 sq mi)
- Elevation: 777 m (2,549 ft)

Population (2025-01-01)
  - Total: 150
  - Density: 10/km^{2} (26/sq mi)
- Time zone: UTC+1 (CET)
  - Summer (DST): UTC+2 (CEST)
- Website: Official website

Ribas de Campos is a municipality located in the province of Palencia, Castile and León, Spain. It is on the course of the Canal de Castilla.

According to the 2004 census (INE), the municipality had a population of 185 inhabitants.

== See also ==
- Monastery of Santa Cruz de Ribas
