= Monastery of Santa Cruz de Ribas =

Spanish monastery

Coordinates: 42.1431°N 4.5°W

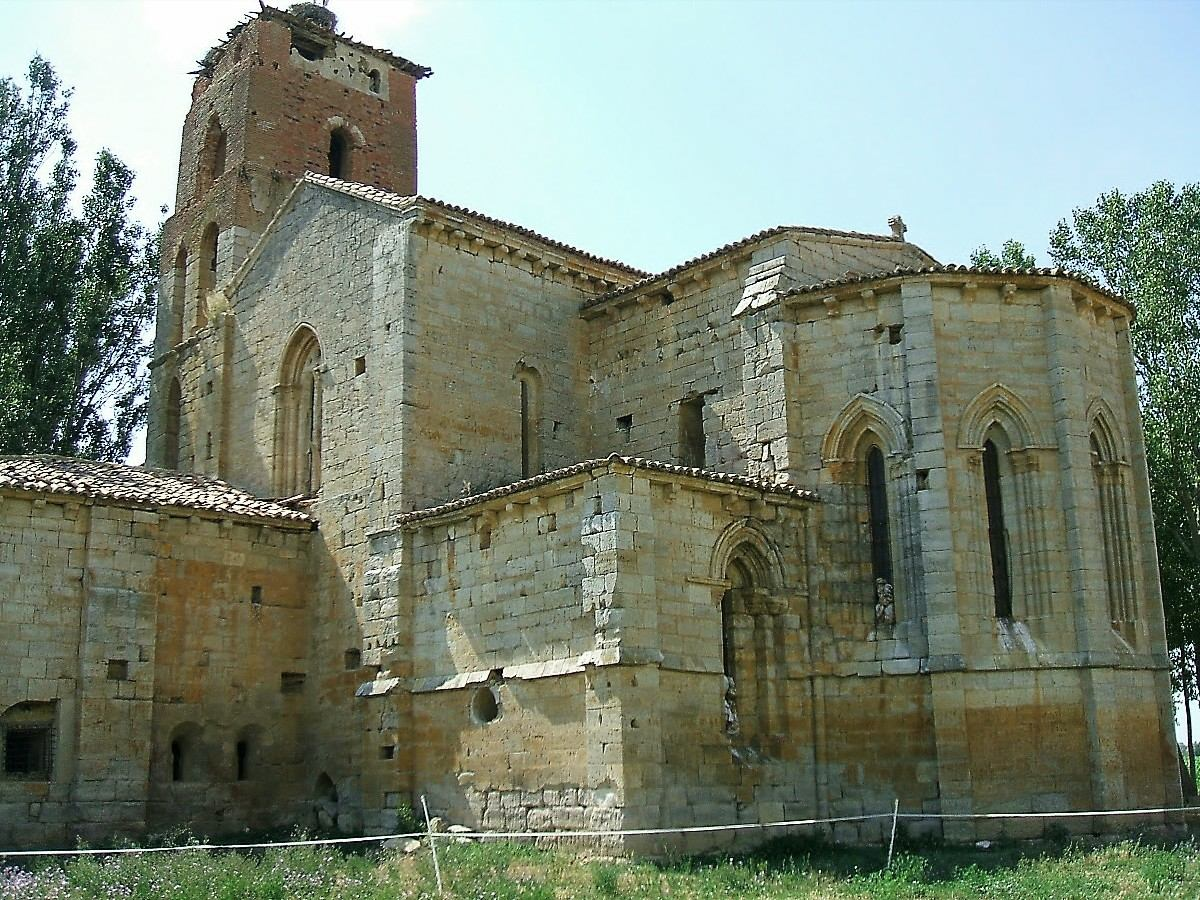
Monastery of Santa Cruz de Ribas

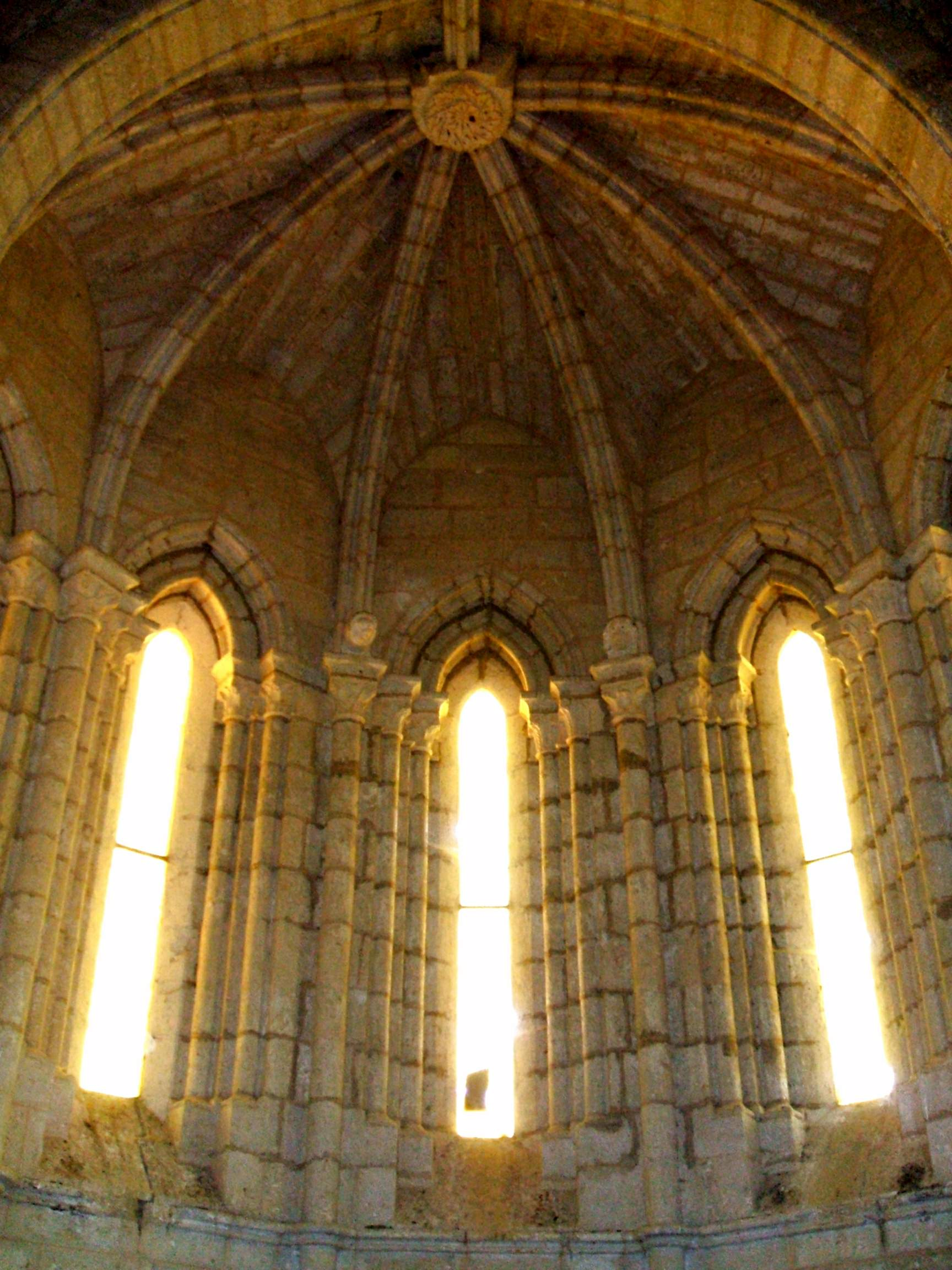
Interior

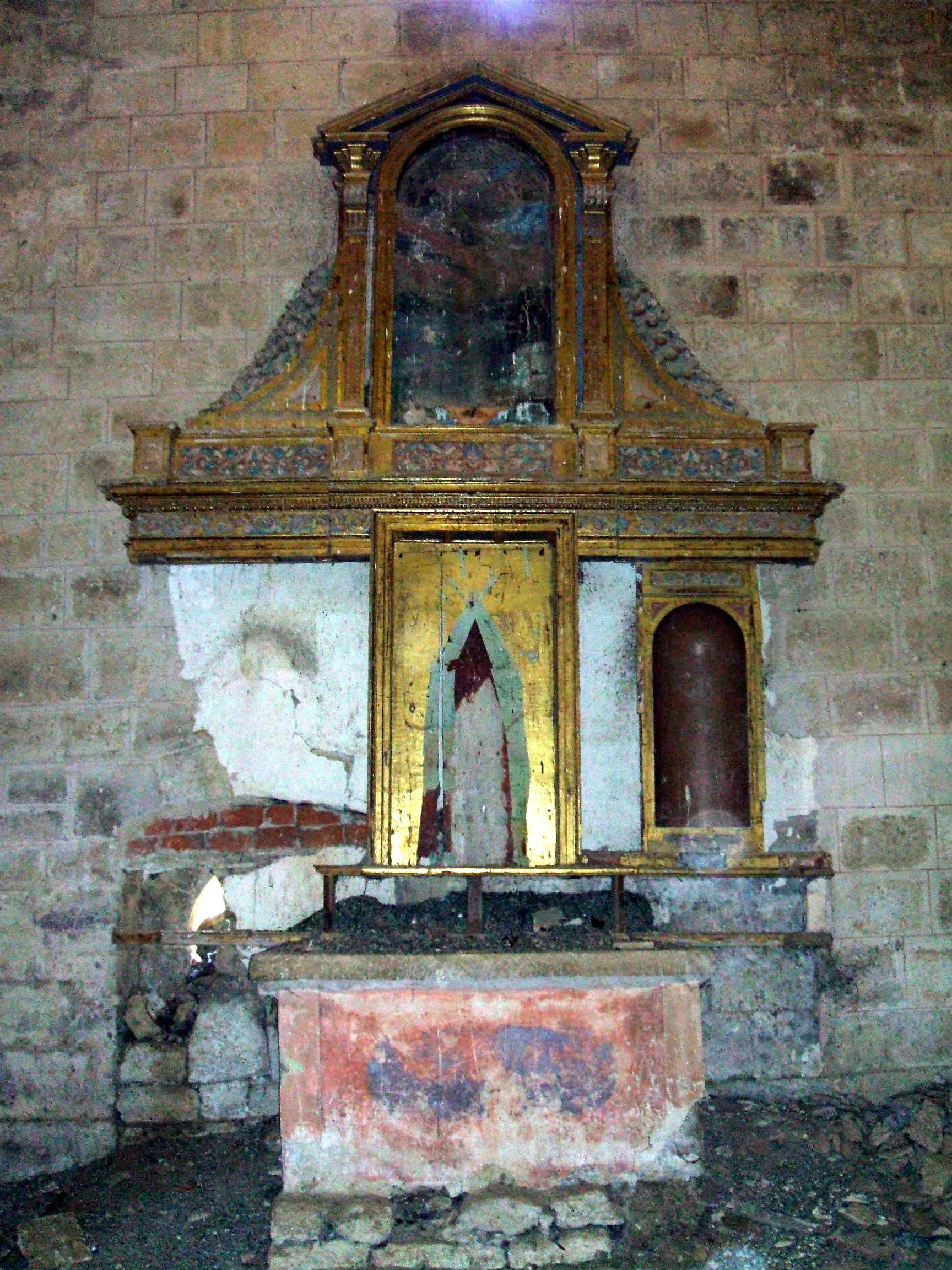
Altar

The Monastery of Santa Cruz de Ribas, also called Santa Cruz de la Zarza, is a semi-ruined Spanish monastery of the Premonstratensian order. Located in the low valley of the Carrión River, it is situated between Ribas de Campos and Monzón de Campos, in the region of Tierra de Campos in Province of Palencia, Castile and León. The building was constructed in a transitional style between Romanesque and Gothic (the proto-Romano-Gothic/Cistercian architecture style). The building is indexed in the Spanish heritage register of Bien de Interés Cultural under the reference RI-51-0000811.

The foundation of the monastery dates to 1176, when King Alfonso VIII of Castile brought the Premonstratensian monks from the Monastery of Santa María de Retuerta. During the Middle Ages it belonged to the lower Merindad of Monzon (Meryndat de Monçon).

At the end of the 16th century, Philip II of Spain provided the monastery with 50,000 ducats to pay for expansion and repair work to prevent the community from moving to Valladolid. In 1592, the monarch and his children visited the monastery. In 1627, the move of the majority of the Premonstratensians reduced the community to that of a priory. A fire in 1715 and a devastating flood in 1739 marked the preliminaries of its 1841 desamortización, the process of confiscation of assets which affected most of the ancient monasteries in Spain.

== See also ==
- Bienes de interés cultural de la provincia de Palencia
