= Santa María Ananúñez =

- Village
- Location within Province of Burgos Location within Castile and León Location within Spain
- Coordinates: 42°29′1″N 4°12′34″W
- Country: Spain
- Autonomous community: Castile and León
- Province: Province of Burgos
- Municipality: Melgar de Fernamental
- Elevation: 829 m (2,720 ft)

Population
  - Total: 12

Santa María Ananúñez is a village located in the municipality of Melgar de Fernamental, in Burgos province, Castile and León, Spain. As of 2020, it has a population of 12.

== Geography ==
Santa María Ananúñez is located 66km west-northwest of Burgos.
