= Melgar de Fernamental =

- Municipality and town
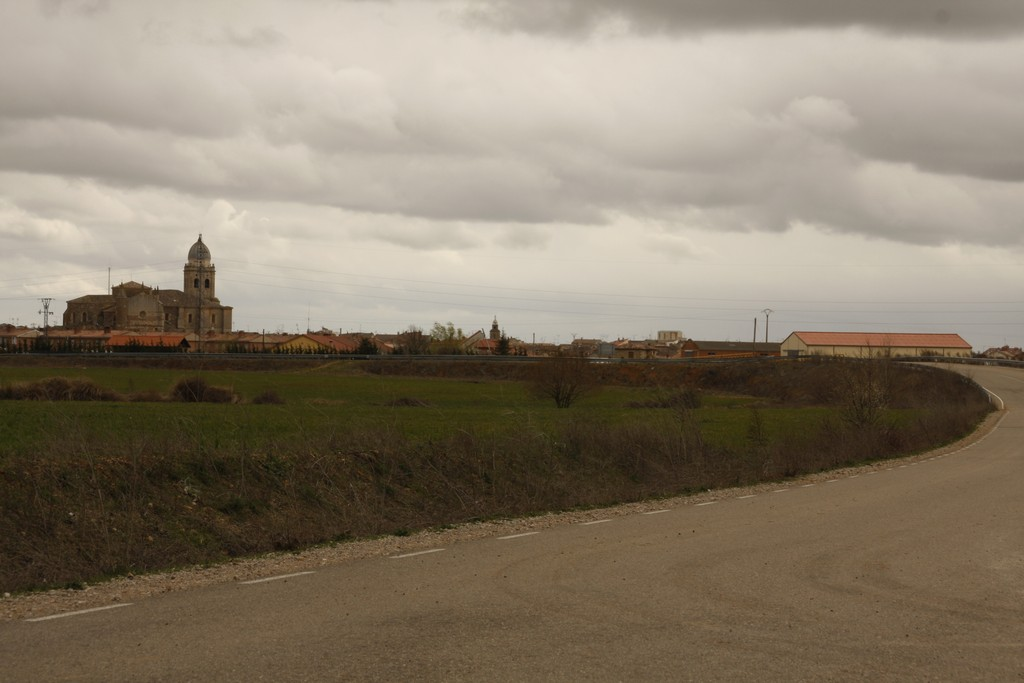
- View of Melgar de Fernamental, 2010

- Flag Coat of arms

- Location within Castile and León Location within Spain
- Coordinates: 42°24′15″N 4°14′44″W
- Country: Spain
- Autonomous community: Castile and León
- Province: Burgos
- Comarca: Odra-Pisuerga

Area
  - Total: 109 km^{2} (42 sq mi)
- Elevation: 821 m (2,694 ft)

Population (2025-01-01)
  - Total: 1,496
  - Density: 13.7/km^{2} (35.5/sq mi)
- Time zone: UTC+1 (CET)
  - Summer (DST): UTC+2 (CEST)
- Postal code: 09100
- Website: http://www.melgardefernamental.es/

Historical population
Year	Pop.	±%
1900	2,293	—
1910	2,704	+17.9%
1920	2,614	−3.3%
1930	2,807	+7.4%
1940	2,868	+2.2%
1950	3,097	+8.0%
1960	3,348	+8.1%
1970	2,335	−30.3%
1981	2,219	−5.0%
1991	2,139	−3.6%
1995	2,215	+3.6%
1999	2,038	−8.0%
2003	1,986	−2.6%
2004	1,956	−1.5%
2005	1,948	−0.4%
2006	1,876	−3.7%
2007	1,889	+0.7%
Source: National Institute of Statistics (Spain)

Melgar de Fernamental is a municipality and town along the Pisuerga river, in the province of Burgos, Castile and León, Spain. At the 2008 census (INE), it had a population of 1,898.

== Former municipalities ==
Incorporated into Melgar in the 1970s were the former municipalities of 09349 Santa María Ananúñez from Burgos province and 34162 San Llorente de la Vega from Palencia province, including the following places:

- Melgar.
- San Llorente de la Vega
- Santa María Ananúñez
- Tagarrosa
- Valtierra de Ríopisuerga.

Other municipalities incorporated into Melgar in past centuries were:

- San Zibrián (14th century)
- San Juan (14th century)
- Zorita
- Quintanilla de Muñoroz (16th century)
- Abánades de Abaxo
- Abánades del Medio
- Abánades de Suso (14th century)

== History ==
By the time of Roman Empire, the ancient city of Dessobriga was placed between the municipalities of Melgar de Fernamental, Osorno La Mayor and Osornillo, being its land Melgarese ground today. However, through this area passed multiple Roman roadways. Among them, the most important was the Hispania-Italica, which passed through cities such as Caesaraugusta, Segisamone and Asturicaugusta. The Saldania Roadway started by the river Pisuerga, opposite the town. The Pisuerga Roadway connected the actual municipalities of Herrera de Pisuerga and Astudillo, passing on the fertile plain of the river at the foot of Melgar.

== Demography ==
Until recently, there was a general population decrease in the municipality. In 2007, 1,747 people lived in the main urban area, and the rest in different places which were incorporated into Melgar.

== Tourism ==
Monuments and places of interest:

- Assumption of Our Lady Church
- Town Hall
- Cordon House
- Palazuelos House
- Our Lady of Zorita Hermitage
- Channel of Castile, known as Canal de Castilla

== People from Melgar de Fernamental ==
- Luis Martín (1846–1906)- 24th Superior General of the Society of Jesus.
- Antonio del Hierro Aparicio (1897–1973)- Bullfighter in decade 1910-20.

== Sources ==
Melgar de Fernamental, Domingo Ortega Gutiérrez, Simancas Ediciones, S.A. Legal deposit VA-500-94 (1994, Valladolid, Spain). Copyright Melgar de Fernamental Council.
