= Melgar de Fernamental Town Hall =

Coordinates: 42.4036°N 4.2445°W

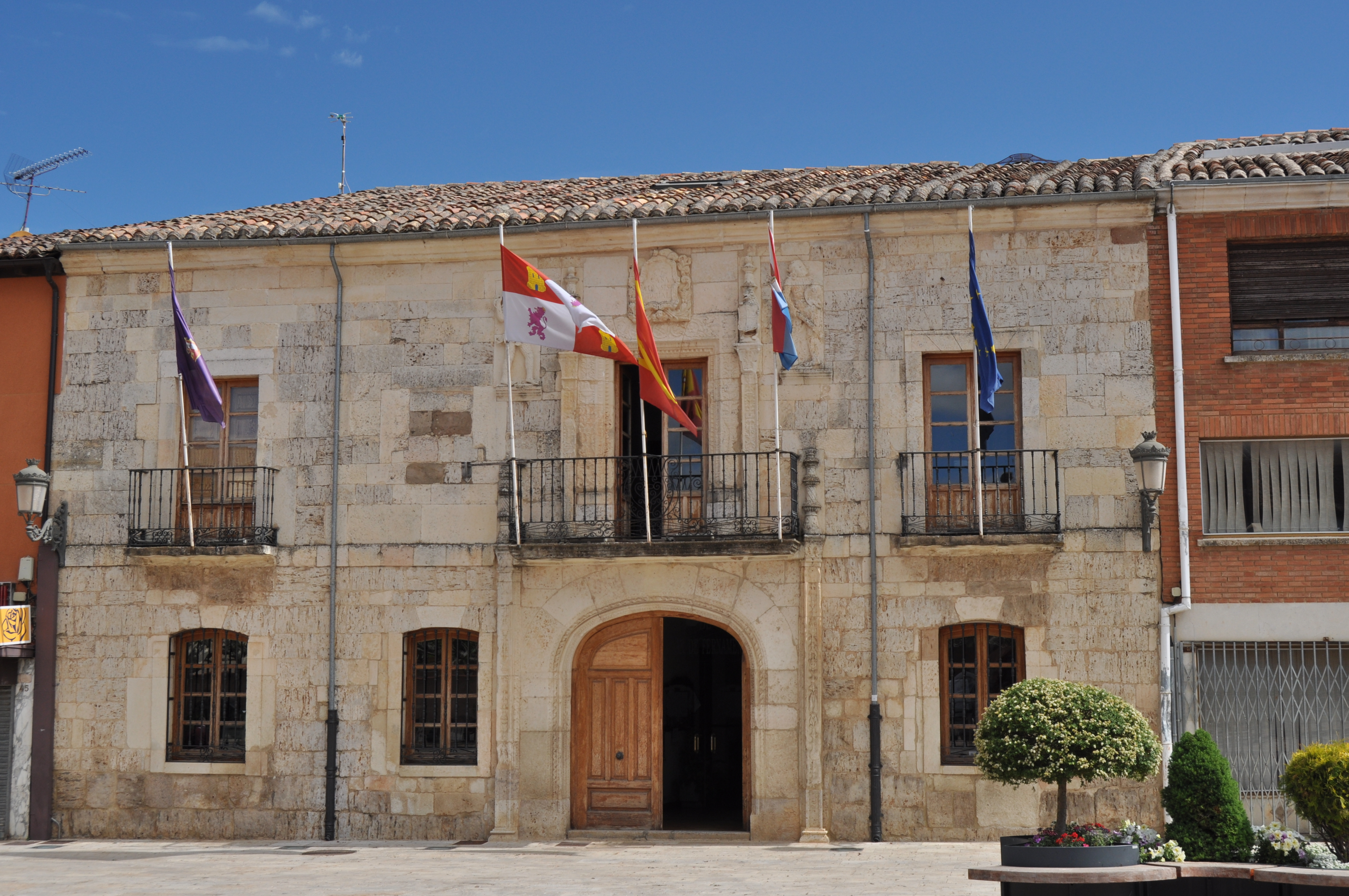
- Interactive map of the Melgar de Fernamental Town Hall area

The Melgar de Fernamental Town Hall is located in Melgar de Fernamental, Spain. Placed in the center of Spain Square, it is built in plateresque style. Its reduced arch front gate is flanked of pilasters, crowned with a central balcony accompanied of columns. Likewise, it presents coats of arms. The coat of arms of the town is shown on the top part of the central balcony.

This small palace belonged to the Calatrava order, although without carrying the own coat of arms of this order.
