= Osorno la Mayor =

- municipality
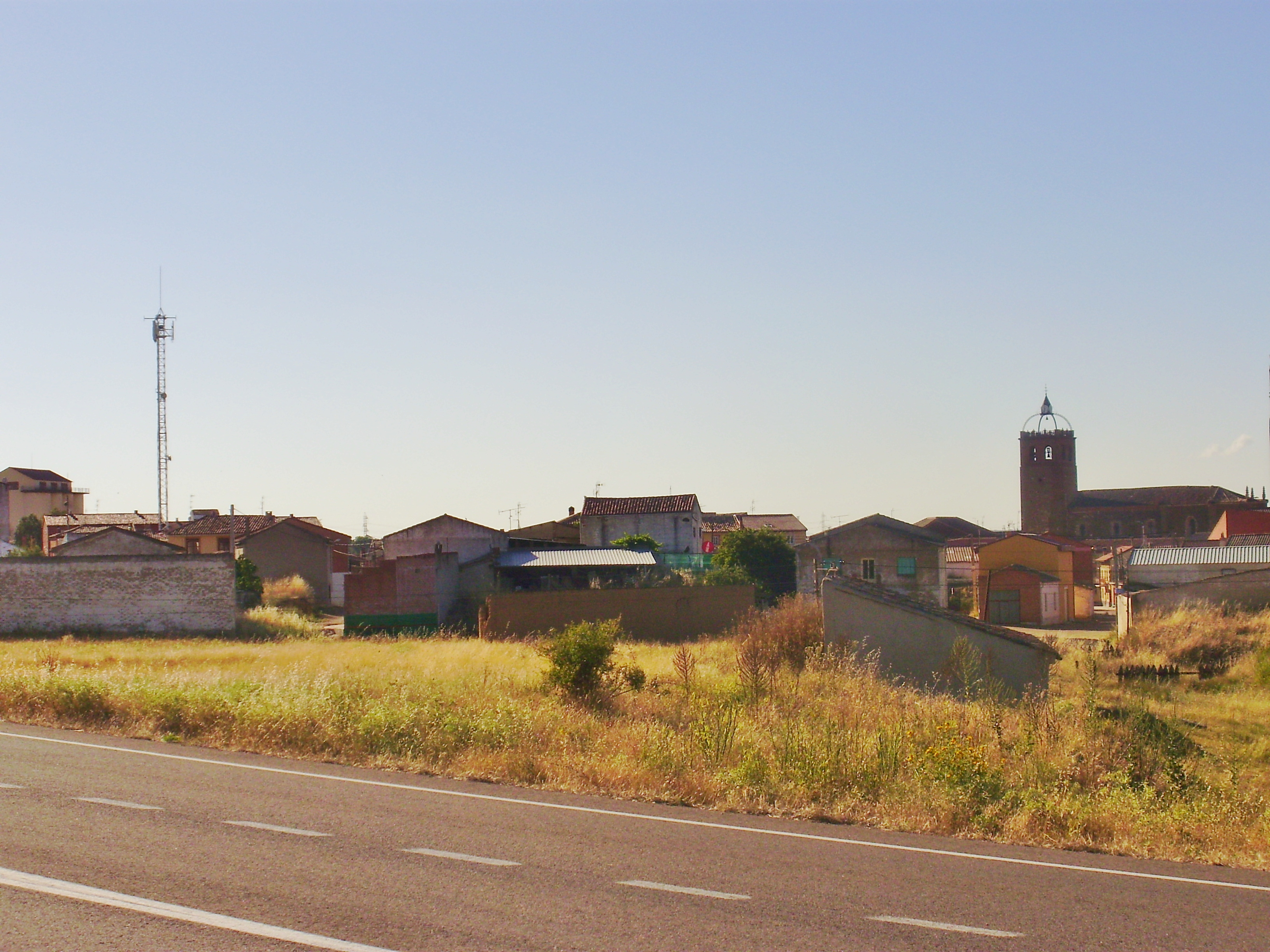

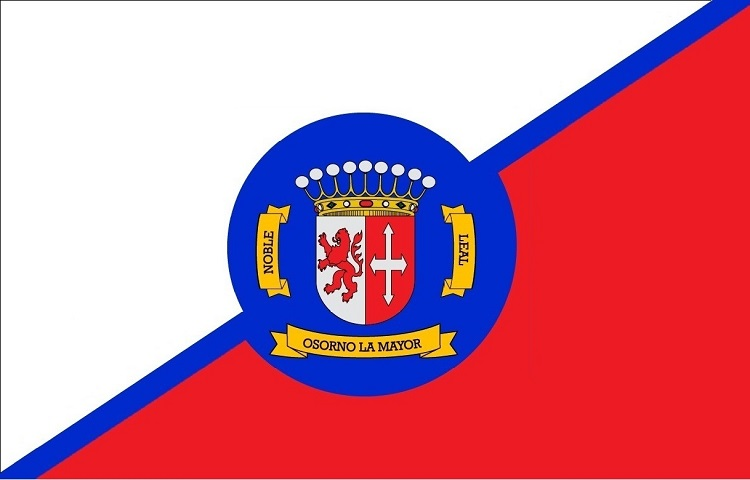
- Flag Coat of arms

- Location within Castile and León Location within Spain
- Coordinates: 42°24′41″N 04°21′41″W
- Country: Spain
- Autonomous community: Castile and León
- Province: Palencia
- Comarca: Tierra de Campos

Government

Area
  - Total: 89.16 km^{2} (34.42 sq mi)
- Elevation: 808.7 m (2,653 ft)

Population (2025-01-01)
  - Total: 1,180
- Time zone: UTC+1 (CET)
  - Summer (DST): UTC+2 (CEST)
- Website: Official website

Osorno la Mayor is a municipio in Palencia province, Castile and León, Spain. The Chilean city of Osorno and Osorno Province (Chile) are named after this place.

== General information ==
- Covers 88.6 square kilometers and has roughly 1,500 residents.
- The villages of Villadiezma, Las Cabañas de Castilla and Santillana de Campos are hamlets of Osorno la Mayor (they belong to the same municipal district).
- Has easy access to the highways Autovía Camino de Santiago and Autovía Cantabria-Meseta, and also has a train station.

== Location ==
Osorno la Mayor is located on the eastern edge of the province in a region called Tierra de Campos, 50 kilometers from the provincial capital Palencia. The town is considered a crossroad for its location on the natural path from the northern plateau to the Bay of Biscay, and from Burgos towards León and Galicia.

== Economy ==
Economic activity in this region has historically been based on agriculture, in particular the cultivation of grains, although this activity is now in decline. Construction, public works projects, and services are booming due to Osorno la Mayor's proximity to two highways (Burgos-León and Palencia-Santander) that pass nearby and the rail lines that follow the same route. The municipality also has an industrial park which drives significant economic activity.

== Water ==
The township is irrigated by water from the Valdavia and Boedo rivers as well as the Canal de Castilla. Lock number 15 of the north branch of the channel is located in the township. Only traces remain of the buildings that were on the site of the lock as they were demolished before it was declared a protected historical landmark.

== History ==
Thanks to some artifacts that have been found on the township's land, it is known that it hosted a Roman settlement primarily of a military nature. The artifacts have appeared over the years, without any systematic archaeological dig. More recently, organized excavations have found traces of human settlement that may go as far back as the Mesolithic Age. The area grew in importance starting in the Middle Ages, no doubt the result of its physical location.

Today only the town hall and some elements of the municipal church, such as the baptismal font and the baroque altar, attest to a past with artistic or historical interest.

== Holiday celebrations ==
The most prominent holidays in Osorno la Mayor are the celebration of Our Lady of Ronte, the Pilgrimage of St. Pantaleón and the festivities of San Miguel de los Santos, which is held on the first weekend of July. Easter is also celebrated with fervor; the township has one of the most striking Easter celebrations in the province.
