= Castrillo de Riopisuerga =

Coordinates: 42°31′N 4°15′W

- Municipality and town
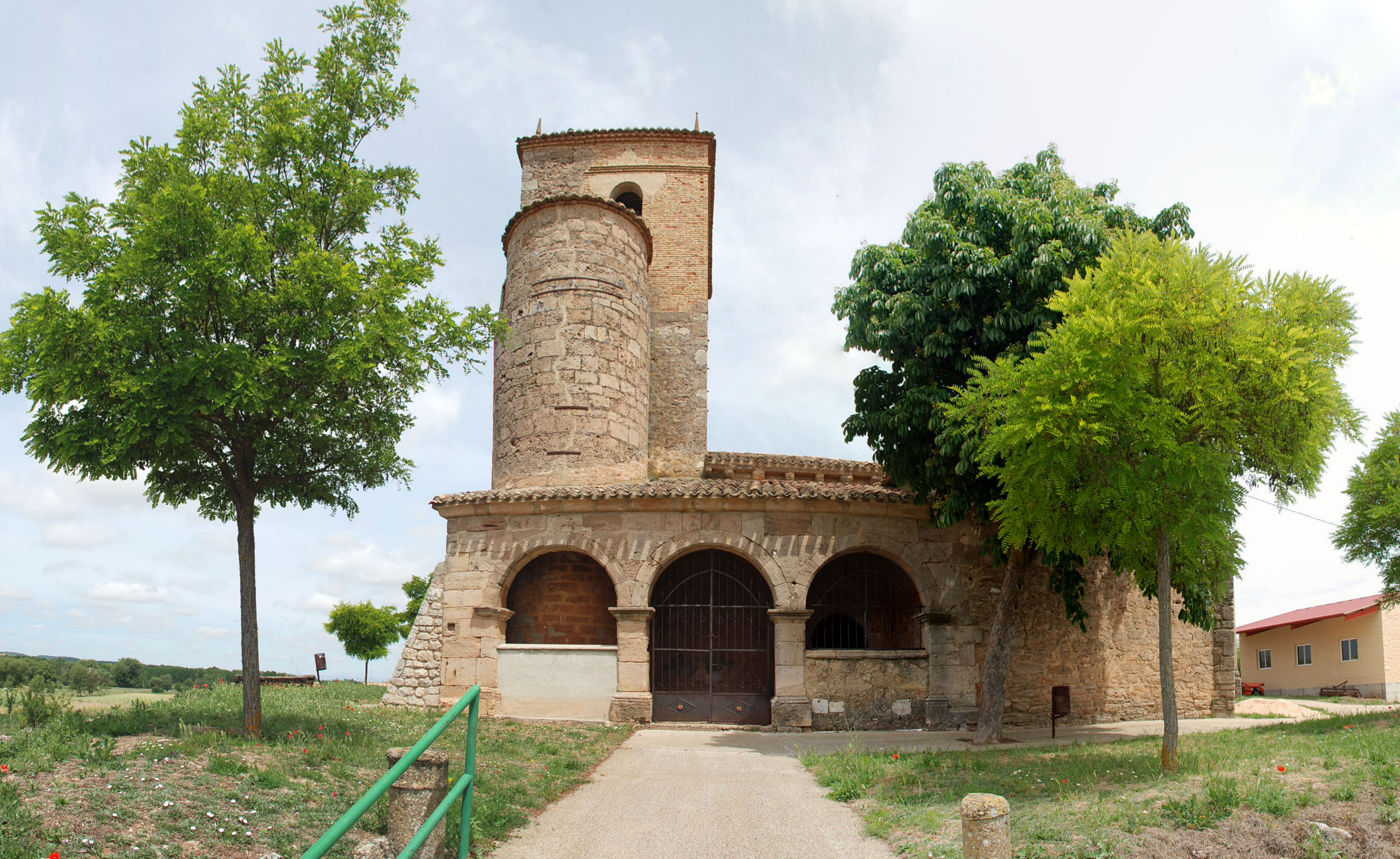

- Coat of arms
- Interactive map of Castrillo de Riopisuerga
- Country: Spain
- Autonomous community: Castile and León
- Province: Burgos
- Comarca: Odra-Pisuerga

Area
  - Total: 17 km^{2} (6.6 sq mi)
- Elevation: 816 m (2,677 ft)

Population (2025-01-01)
  - Total: 56
  - Density: 3.3/km^{2} (8.5/sq mi)
- Time zone: UTC+1 (CET)
  - Summer (DST): UTC+2 (CEST)
- Postal code: 09108
- Website: http://www.castrilloderiopisuerga.es/

Castrillo de Riopisuerga is a municipality located in the province of Burgos, Castile and León, Spain. According to the 2004 census (INE), the municipality has a population of 87 inhabitants. Sites of interest include Lock 10 of the Canal de Castilla and the Church of St. Bartholomew.
