= Piña de Campos =

Coordinates: 42°13′N 4°26′W

- municipality
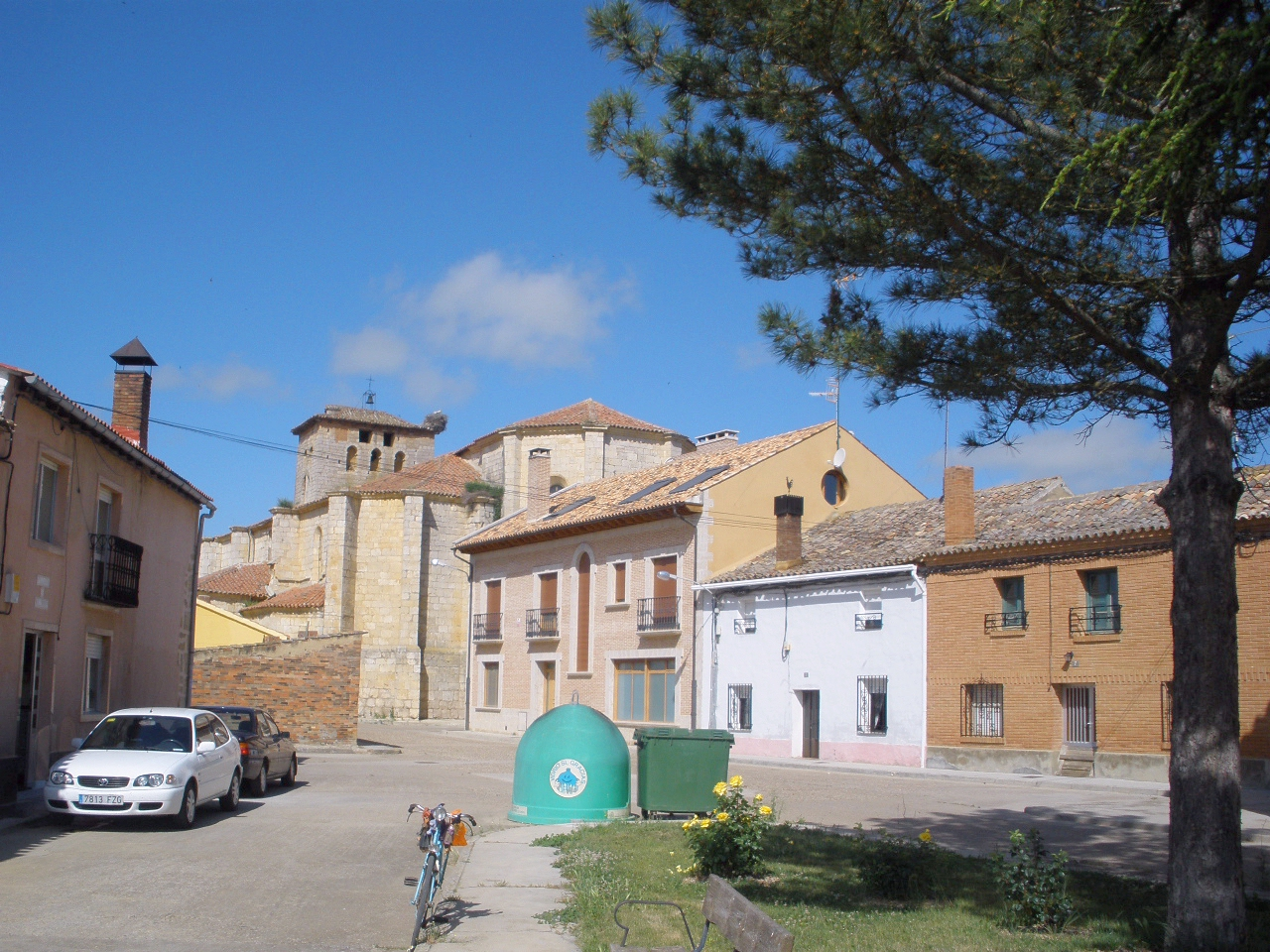

- Coat of arms
- Interactive map of Piña de Campos
- Country: Spain
- Autonomous community: Castile and León
- Province: Palencia
- Municipality: Piña de Campos

Area
  - Total: 12.39 km^{2} (4.78 sq mi)
- Elevation: 760 m (2,490 ft)

Population (2025-01-01)
  - Total: 185
  - Density: 14.9/km^{2} (38.7/sq mi)
- Time zone: UTC+1 (CET)
  - Summer (DST): UTC+2 (CEST)
- Website: Official website

Piña de Campos is a municipality located in the province of Palencia, Castile and León, Spain. According to the 2004 census (INE), the municipality had a population of 279 inhabitants.
