= Herreros =

Herreros is a Spanish surname. Notable people with the surname include:

- Alberto Herreros (born 1969), Spanish basketball player
- Javier Herreros (born 1984), Spanish footballer
- Manuel Herreros (born 1963), Spanish motorcycle racer
- Toni Herreros (born 1972), Spanish slalom canoeist

== See also ==
- Abalos & Herreros
- Herrero
