= Villanueva de San Mancio =

Coordinates: 41°55′N 5°01′W

Villanueva de San Mancio, Spain
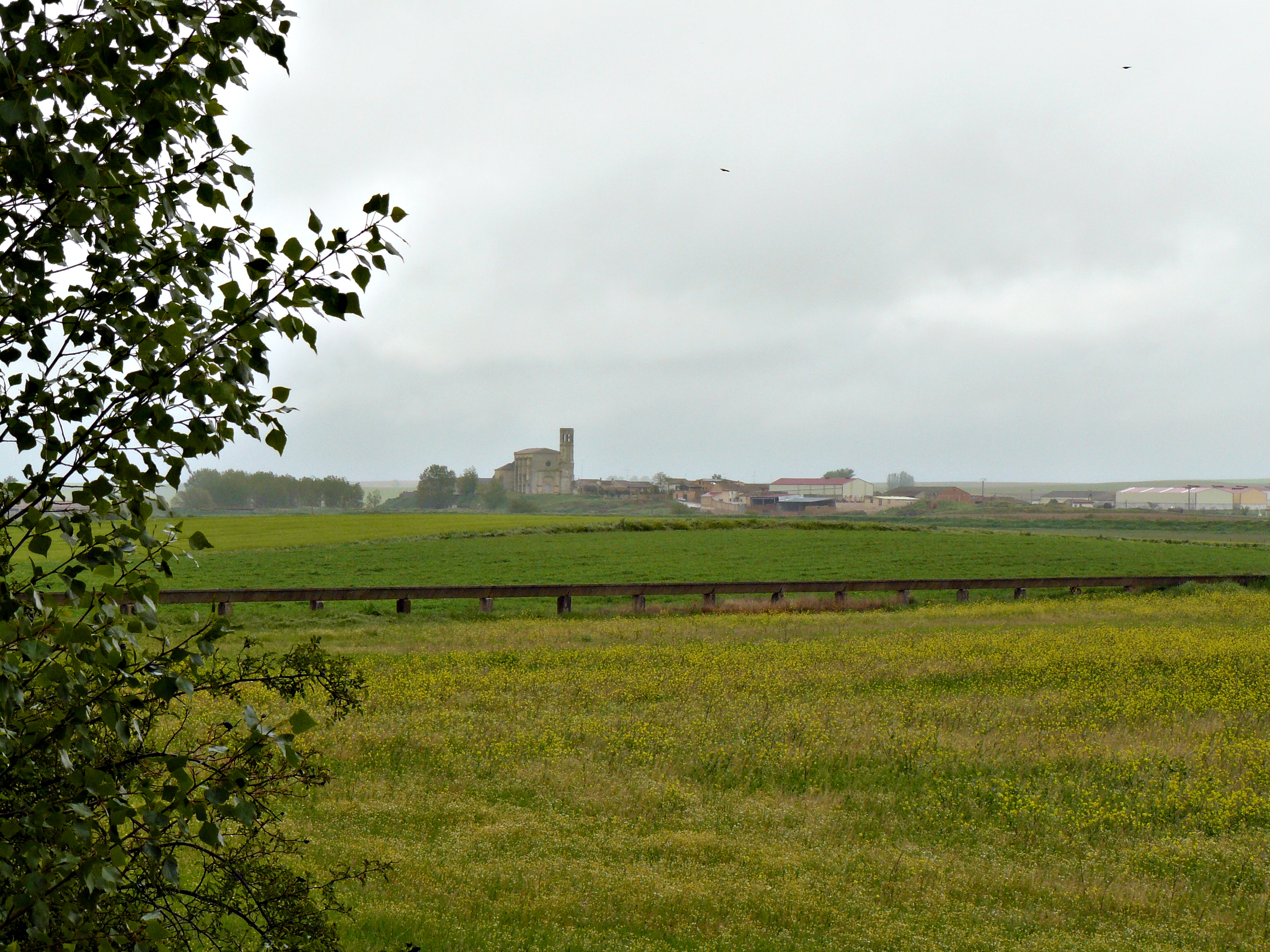
- panoramic view
- Country: Spain
- Autonomous community: Castile and León
- Province: Valladolid
- Municipality: Villanueva de San Mancio

Area
  - Total: 15.16 km^{2} (5.85 sq mi)
- Elevation: 744 m (2,441 ft)

Population (2025-01-01)
  - Total: 96
  - Density: 6.3/km^{2} (16/sq mi)
- Time zone: UTC+1 (CET)
  - Summer (DST): UTC+2 (CEST)

Villanueva de San Mancio is a municipality located in the province of Valladolid, Castile and León, Spain. According to the 2004 census (INE), the municipality had a population of 125 inhabitants.
