= Husillos =

Coordinates: 42°05′N 4°31′W

- municipality
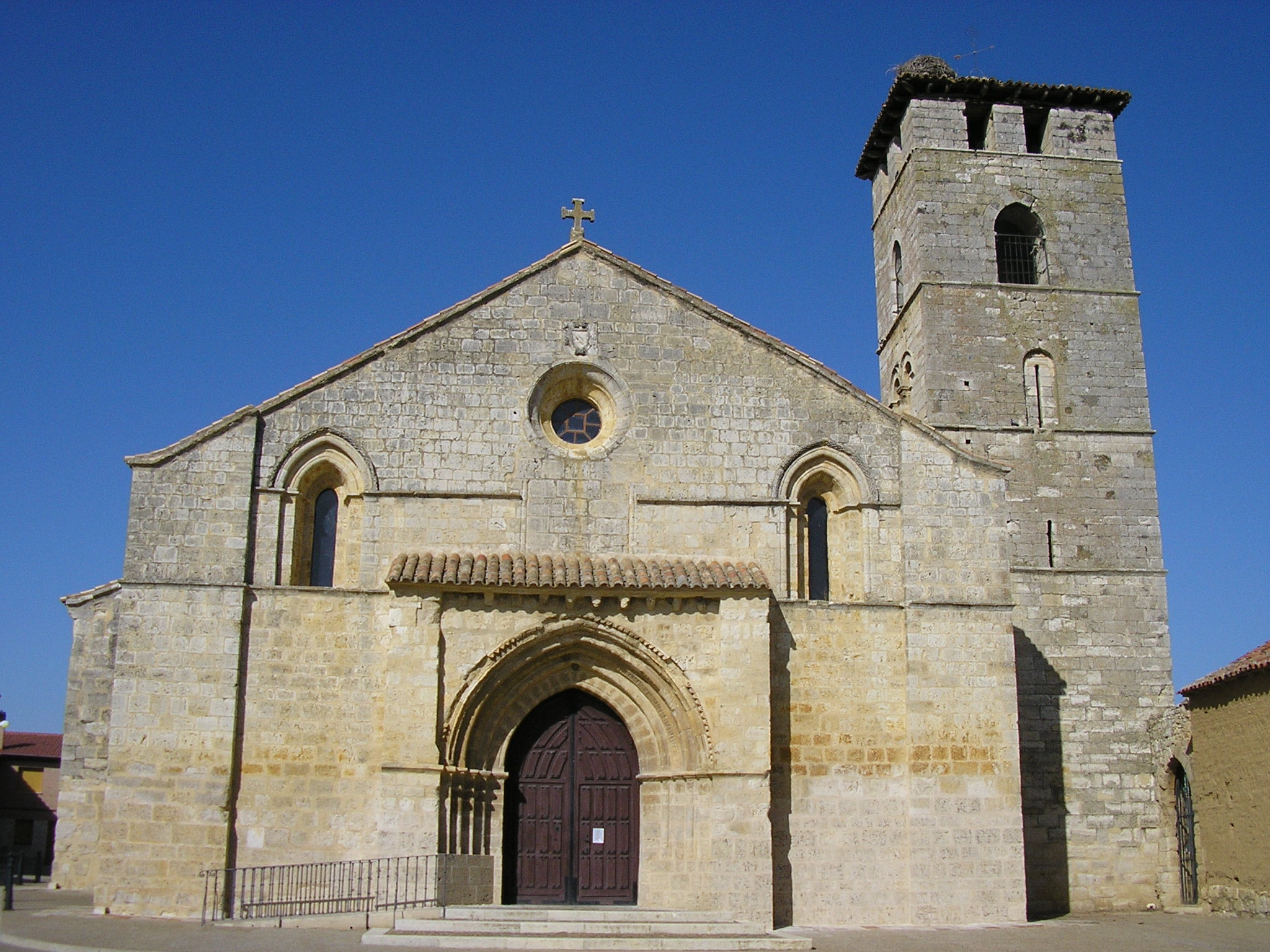

- Coat of arms
- Interactive map of Husillos
- Country: Spain
- Autonomous community: Castile and León
- Province: Palencia
- Municipality: Husillos

Area
  - Total: 16 km^{2} (6.2 sq mi)

Population (2025-01-01)
  - Total: 413
  - Density: 26/km^{2} (67/sq mi)
- Time zone: UTC+1 (CET)
  - Summer (DST): UTC+2 (CEST)
- Website: Official website

Husillos is a municipality located in the province of Palencia, Castile and León, Spain. According to the 2004 census (INE), the municipality had a population of 208 inhabitants.

== Geography and population ==
Husillos is a little municipality in Northern Spain, in Castile-León, 11 km away, from Palencia and about 260 km northwest of Madrid. Husillos has 208 inhabitants and is 16,4 km² in size.

== History ==
Husillos has had dwellers called vacceos of Celtic origin, and then successively the Romans, the Visigoths, Muslims and finally Modern Europeans. The recent history of Husillos starts at the end of the 9th century AD, when the presbiterus Gatón rebuilt the Church of Santa Maria (vid Archivo General de Simancas) that had been destroyed during the Muslim occupation of Palencia (8th and 9th centuries.)

During the 10th century the Abbey of Santa Maria de Fusiellos was built, also called Santa Maria de la Dehesa Brava. In the 11th century the king Sancho el Mayor (Navarre) gave the town of Husillos to the Bishop of Palencia, the nearest city. The Middle Ages was the Golden Era for the region of Palencia that comprised Husillos. An important Jewish community lived in the Palencia region during several centuries, although they were finally forced to leave for political and religious reasons in 1492. In the 16th century and after the Battle of Saint Quentin that ended on Saint Laurent's day, AUGUST 10th 1557, Philip II of SPAIN built the Palace of San Lorenzo del Escorial, near Madrid. The king asked the Abbot of Husillos whether he could give the relic of Saint Laurent, his foot, for the palace of El Escorial. The Abbot gave him it as a present.

In the 16th century the abbey was moved to Ampudia (Palencia).

The Museum of Archaeology in Madrid holds a Roman sarcophagus from II A.D. with the Myth of Orestes as decoration. It is a piece imported from Rome and found in Husillos. It was reused in the year 960 as the burial of the Count of Monzón Fernando Ansúrez. It was found in Husillos in the 19th century. The Church of Husillos is a National Monument since 1931.

== Climate ==
The climate of Husillos is continental with extremes in winter of -15.C and 40.C in summer.
