= Tamariz de Campos =

Coordinates: 41°58′N 5°01′W

Tamariz de Campos, Spain
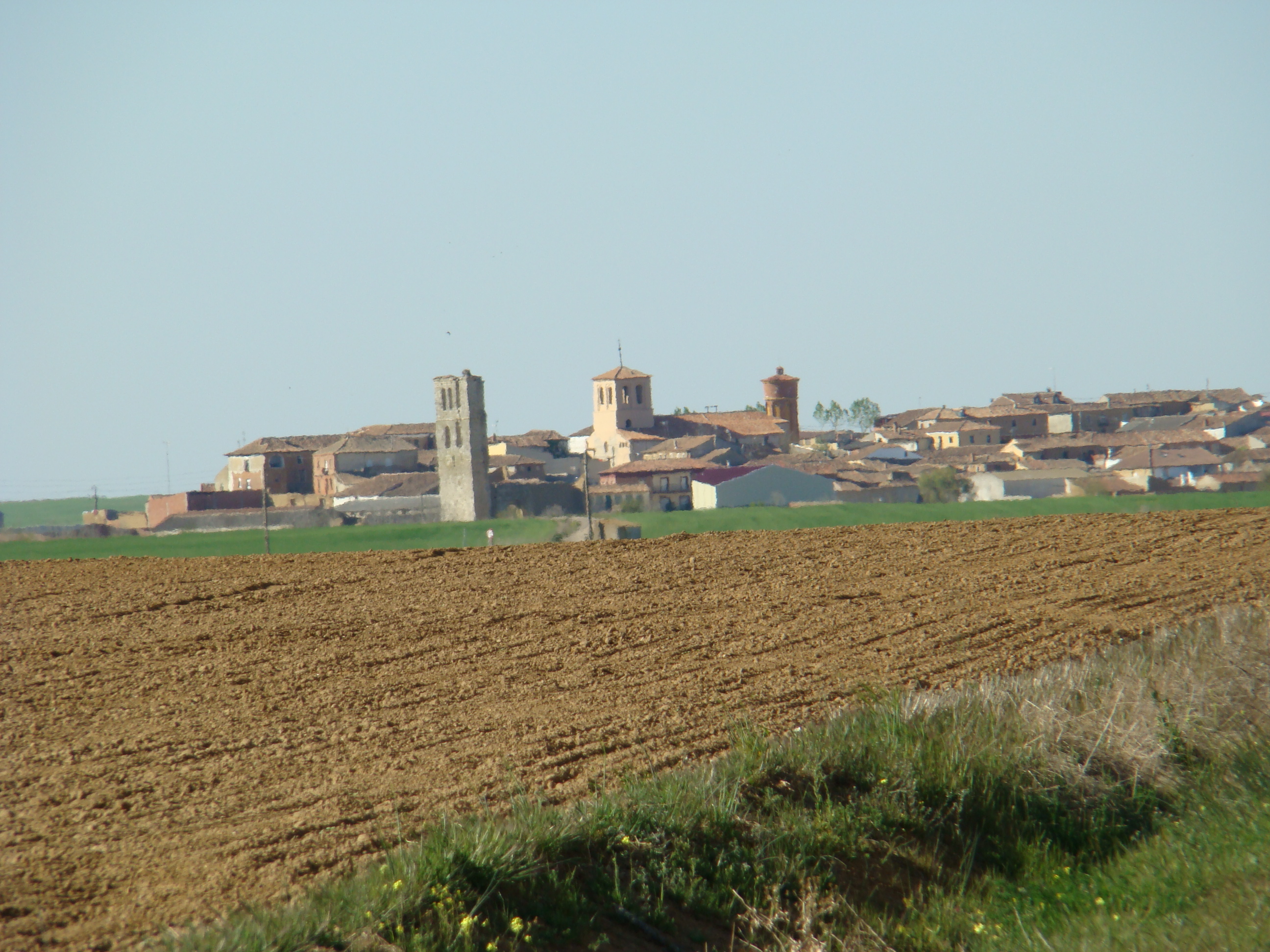
- panoramic view
- Country: Spain
- Autonomous community: Castile and León
- Province: Valladolid
- Municipality: Tamariz de Campos

Area
  - Total: 38 km^{2} (15 sq mi)
- Elevation: 753 m (2,470 ft)

Population (2025-01-01)
  - Total: 85
  - Density: 2.2/km^{2} (5.8/sq mi)
- Time zone: UTC+1 (CET)
  - Summer (DST): UTC+2 (CEST)

Tamariz de Campos is a municipality located in the province of Valladolid, Castile and León, Spain. According to the 2014 census (INE), the municipality has a population of 69.
