= San Llorente de la Vega =

- Village
- Location within Province of Burgos Location within Castile and León Location within Spain
- Coordinates: 42°26′14″N 4°15′28″W
- Country: Spain
- Autonomous community: Castile and León
- Province: Province of Burgos
- Municipality: Melgar de Fernamental
- Elevation: 798 m (2,618 ft)

Population
  - Total: 52

San Llorente de la Vega is a hamlet located in the municipality of Melgar de Fernamental, in Burgos province, Castile and León, Spain. As of 2020, it has a population of 52.

== Geography ==
San Llorente de la Vega is located 60 km (37 mi) west of Burgos.
