= Villaumbrales =

Coordinates: 42°05′N 4°37′W

- municipality
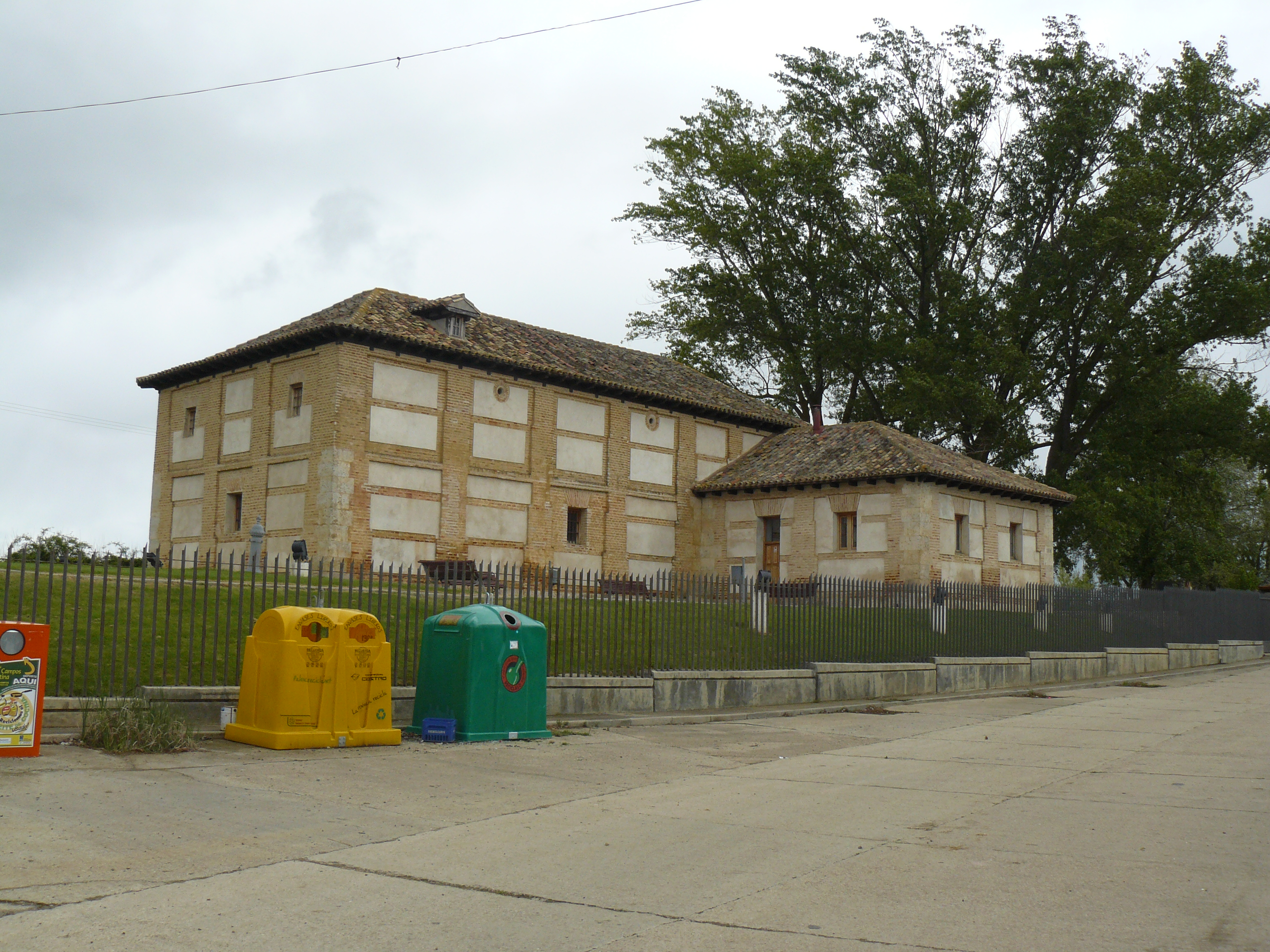

- Coat of arms
- Interactive map of Villaumbrales
- Country: Spain
- Autonomous community: Castile and León
- Province: Palencia
- Municipality: Villaumbrales

Area
  - Total: 41 km^{2} (16 sq mi)

Population (2025-01-01)
  - Total: 627
  - Density: 15/km^{2} (40/sq mi)
- Time zone: UTC+1 (CET)
  - Summer (DST): UTC+2 (CEST)
- Website: Official website

Villaumbrales is a municipality located in the province of Palencia, Castile and León, Spain. According to the 2022 census (INE), the municipality has a population of 650 inhabitants.
