= Cubillas de Cerrato =

Coordinates: 41°48′N 4°28′W

- municipality
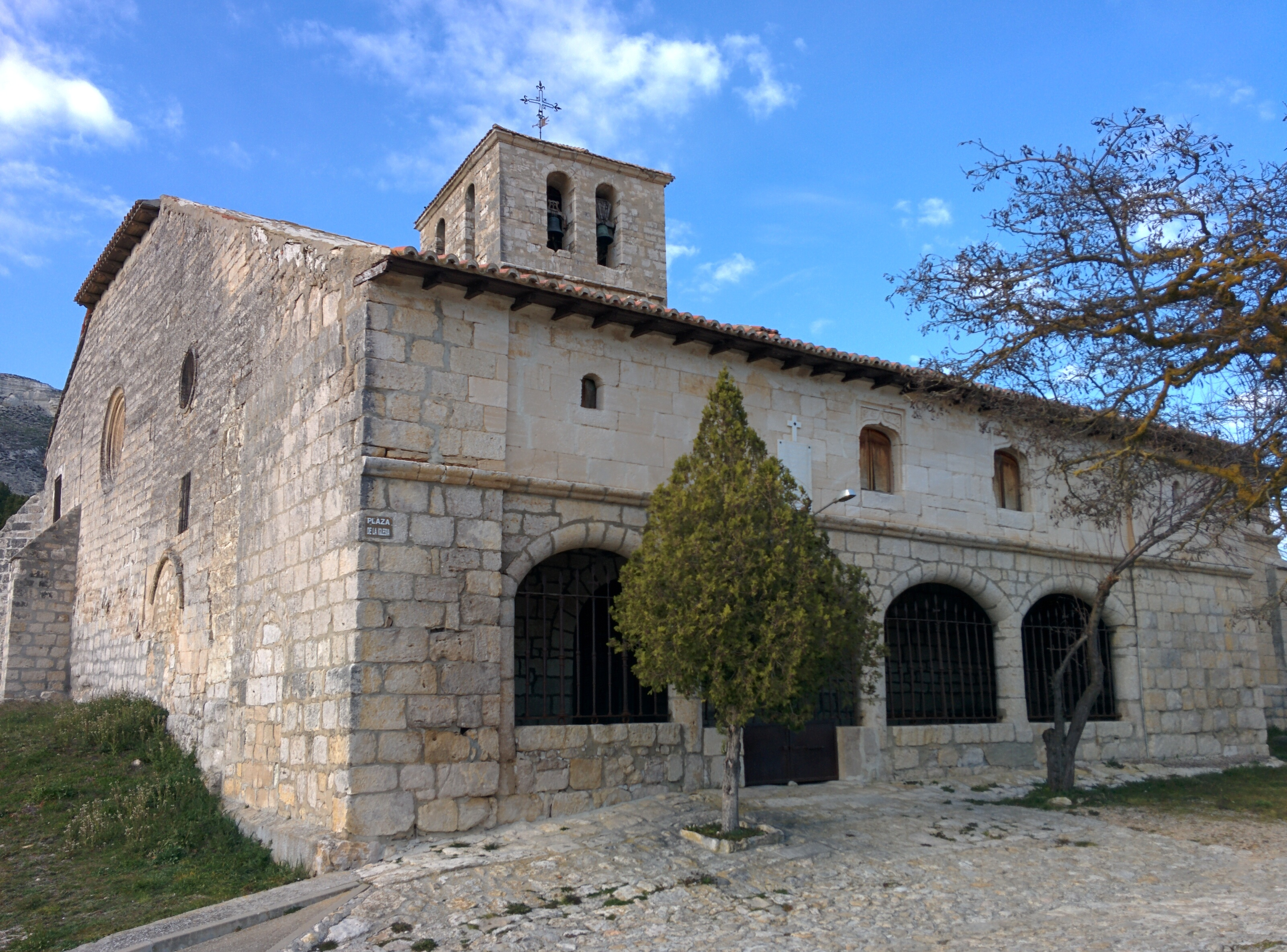
- Interactive map of Cubillas de Cerrato
- Country: Spain
- Autonomous community: Castile and León
- Province: Palencia
- Municipality: Cubillas de Cerrato

Area
  - Total: 20 km^{2} (7.7 sq mi)

Population (2025-01-01)
  - Total: 60
  - Density: 3.0/km^{2} (7.8/sq mi)
- Time zone: UTC+1 (CET)
  - Summer (DST): UTC+2 (CEST)
- Website: Official website

Cubillas de Cerrato is a municipality located in the province of Palencia, Castile and León, Spain. According to the 2004 census (INE), the municipality has a population of 77 inhabitants.
