= Becerril de Campos =

Coordinates: 42°6′31″N 4°38′20″W

- municipality
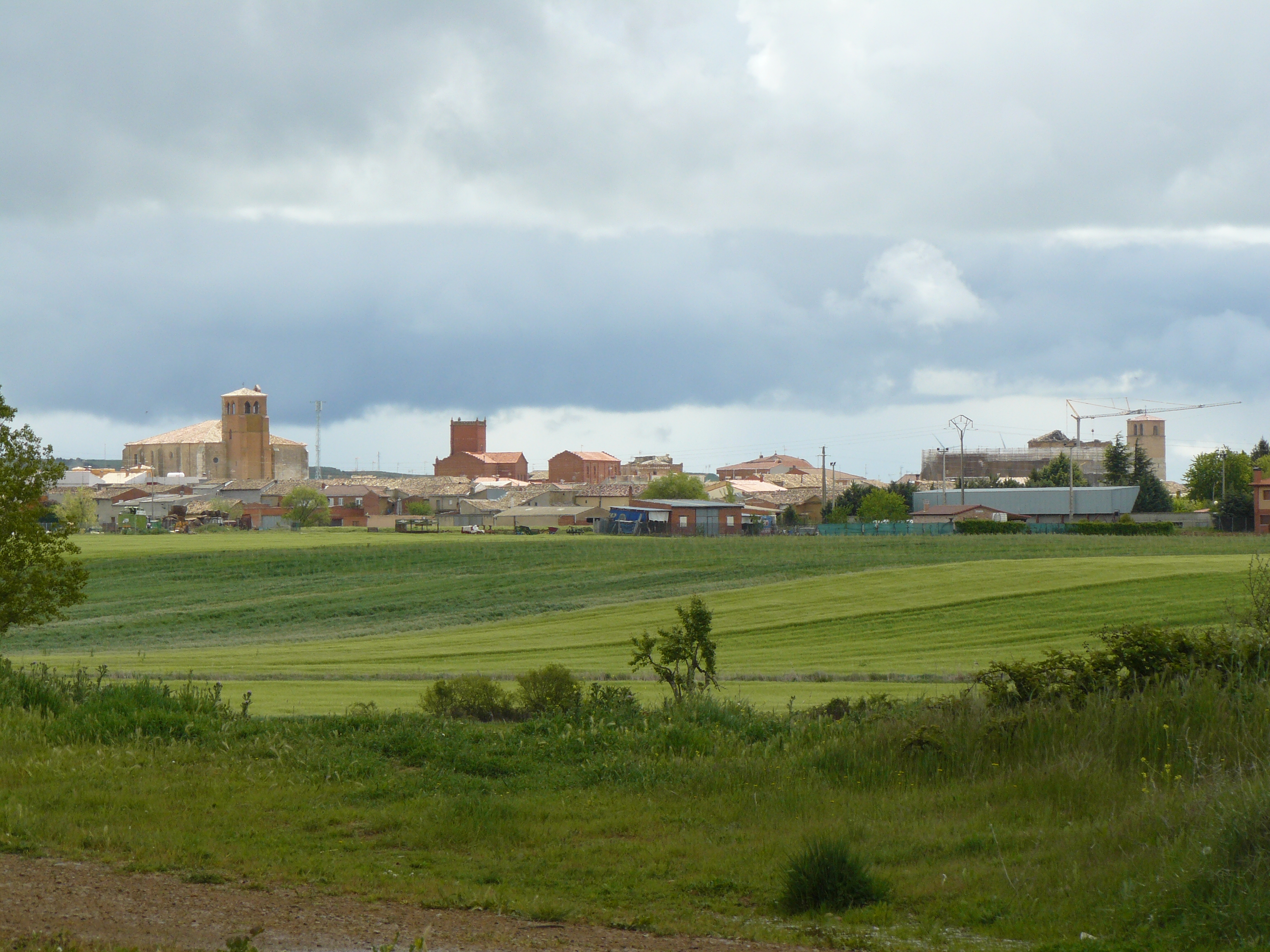

- Flag Coat of arms
- Interactive map of Becerril de Campos
- Country: Spain
- Autonomous community: Castile and León
- Province: Palencia
- Municipality: Becerril de Campos

Area
  - Total: 79 km^{2} (31 sq mi)
- Elevation: 770 m (2,530 ft)

Population (2025-01-01)
  - Total: 737
  - Density: 9.3/km^{2} (24/sq mi)
- Time zone: UTC+1 (CET)
  - Summer (DST): UTC+2 (CEST)
- Website: Official website

Becerril de Campos is a municipality located in the province of Palencia, Castile and León, Spain.

According to the 2004 census (INE), the municipality had a population of 1,028 inhabitants.

It is home to the football club CD Becerril.

== Architecture ==
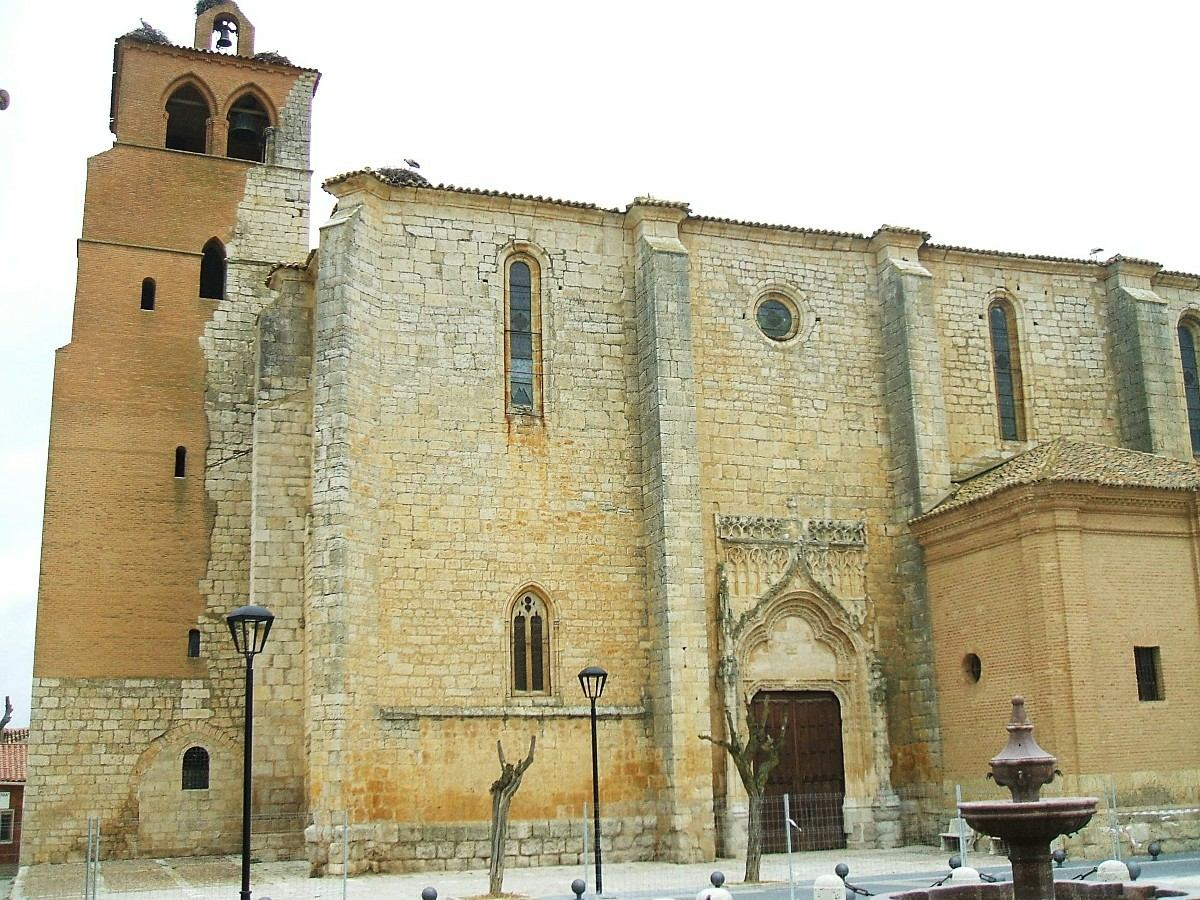
Santa Eugenia Church, created in 1536

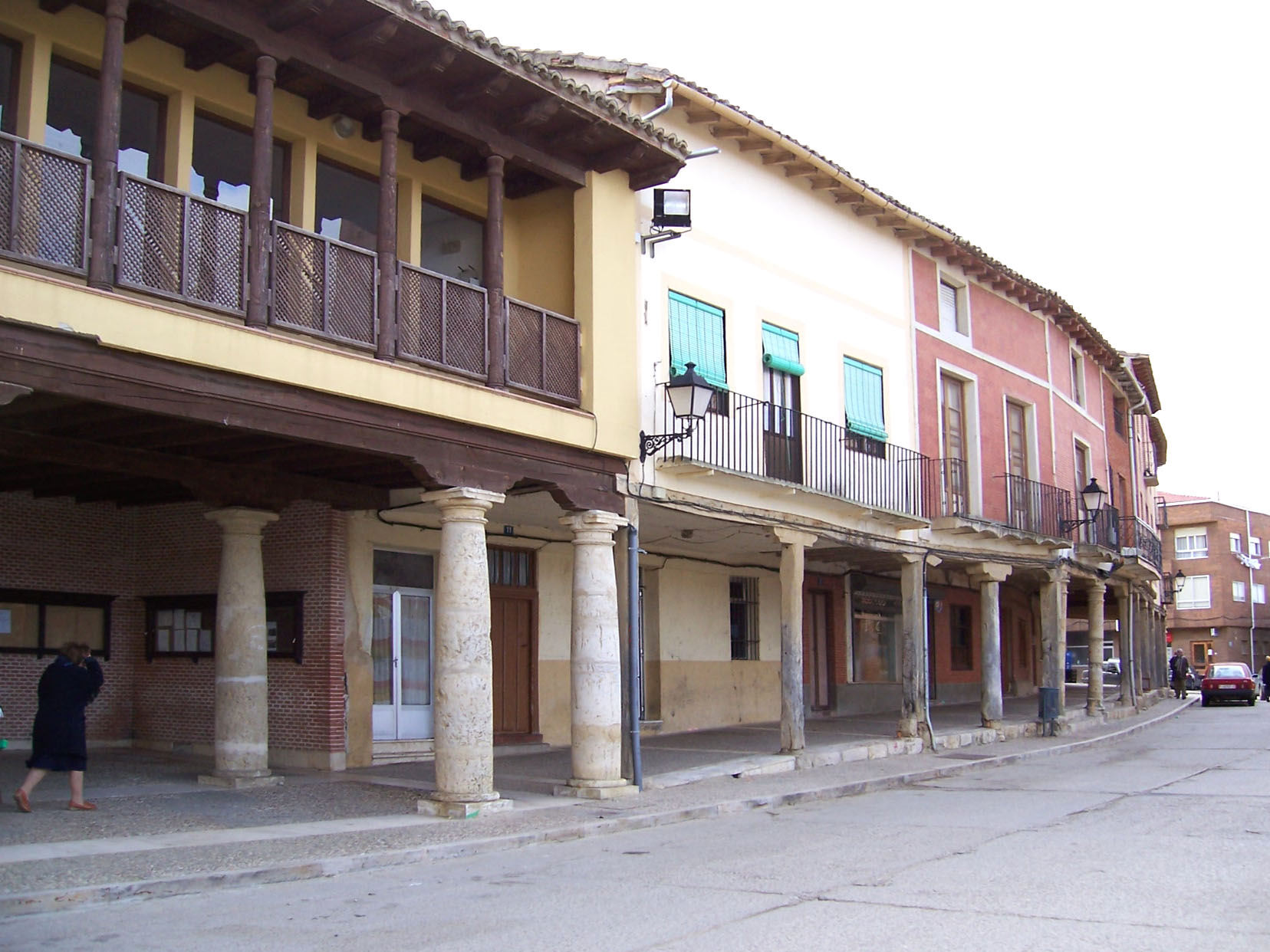
'La Plaza'

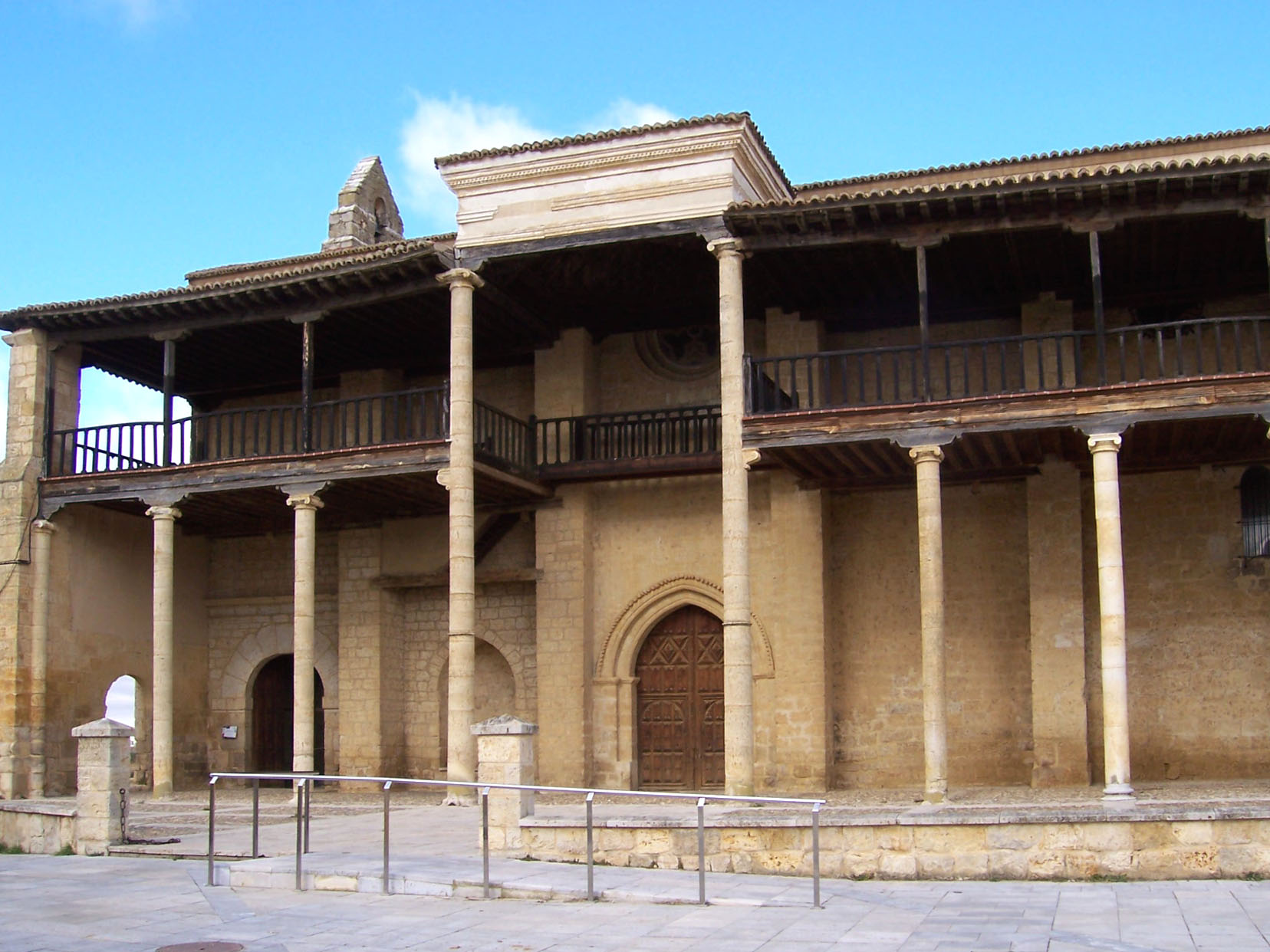
Church-Museum of Santa María (15th century)
