= Cubillas de Rueda =

Cubillas de Rueda, Spain
- Flag Coat of arms

- Location within Spain
- Coordinates: 42°39′19″N 5°10′27″W
- Country: Spain
- Autonomous community: Castile and León
- Province: León
- Municipality: Cubillas de Rueda

Government
  - Mayor: Agustina Álvarez Llamazares (PP)

Area
  - Total: 86.82 km^{2} (33.52 sq mi)
- Elevation: 882 m (2,894 ft)

Population (2025-01-01)
  - Total: 376
  - Density: 4.33/km^{2} (11.2/sq mi)
- Time zone: UTC+1 (CET)
  - Summer (DST): UTC+2 (CEST)
- Postal Code: 24940
- Telephone prefix: 987

Cubillas de Rueda (Spanish pronunciation: [kuˈβiʎas ðe ˈrweða]) is a municipality located in the province of León, Castile and León, Spain. According to the 2010 census (INE), the municipality has a population of 501 inhabitants.
