= Santillana de Campos =

Coordinates: 42°21′53″N 04°22′57″W

Santillana de Campos, Spain
- Seal
- Interactive map of Santillana de Campos, Spain
- Country: Spain
- Autonomous community: Castile and León
- Province: Palencia
- Municipality: Osorno la Mayor

Population
  - Total: 114
- Time zone: UTC+1 (CET)
  - Summer (DST): UTC+2 (CEST)

Santillana de Campos is a hamlet of Osorno la Mayor located in the province of Palencia, Castile and León, Spain. According to the 2005 census (INE), the village has a population of 114 inhabitants.
