= Joel Cubillas =

Paraguayan footballer (born 1958)

Joel Nicanor Cubillas (born 1958 in Paraguay) is a former football defender. Cubillas played for most of his career in Club Rubio Ñú where he made his debut at the age of 15, in 1973, and had nearly 400 caps before moving to Nacional. He was part of the 1972 Rubio Ñú team that won the 2nd division tournament as a substitute, but did not get any playing time during that campaign due to his young age.

Cubillas finished his career in Sportivo Trinidense at the age of 39, accumulating more than 500 caps in Paraguayan football.

== Titles ==
Season	Team	Title
1972	(Paraguay) Club Rubio Ñú	Paraguayan 2nd division
