= Boadilla del Camino =

Coordinates: 42°15′N 4°21′W

- municipality
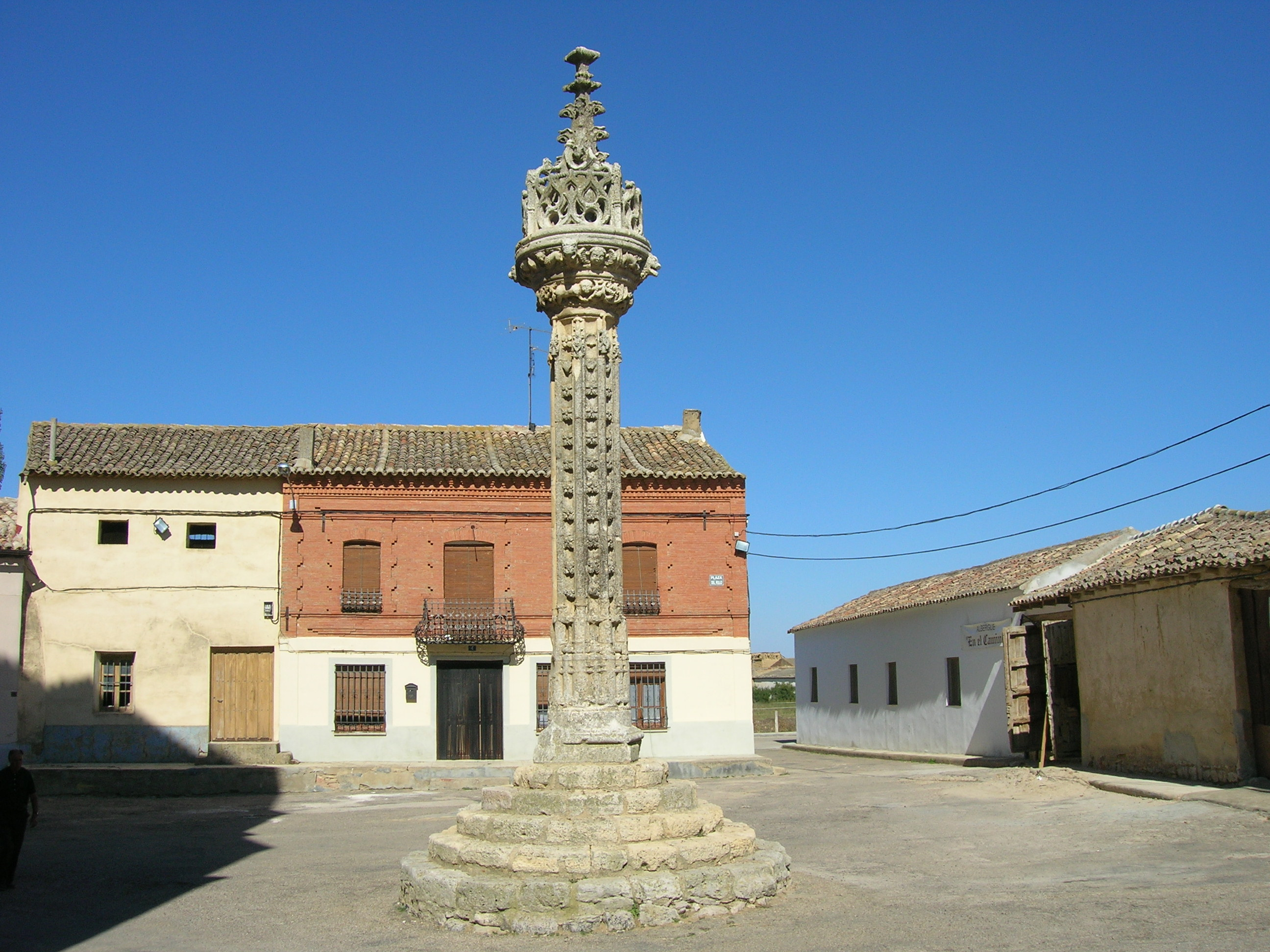

- Flag Coat of arms
- Interactive map of Boadilla del Camino
- Country: Spain
- Autonomous community: Castile and León
- Province: Palencia
- Municipality: Boadilla del Camino

Area
  - Total: 28 km^{2} (11 sq mi)

Population (2025-01-01)
  - Total: 111
  - Density: 4.0/km^{2} (10/sq mi)
- Time zone: UTC+1 (CET)
  - Summer (DST): UTC+2 (CEST)
- Website: Official website

Boadilla del Camino is a municipality located in the province of Palencia, Castile and León, Spain. The name refers to the Camino de Santiago.

According to the 2004 census (INE), the municipality had a population of 166 inhabitants.
