= Alar del Rey =

Coordinates: 42°40′N 4°18′W

- municipality
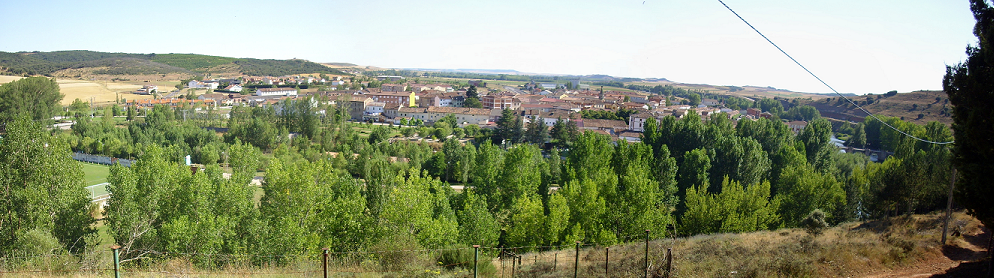
- Panoramic view of Alar del Rey.

- Flag Coat of arms
- Interactive map of Alar del Rey
- Country: Spain
- Autonomous community: Castile and León
- Province: Palencia
- Municipality: Alar del Rey

Government
  - Mayor: Alberto Félix Maestro García (PP)

Area
  - Total: 57.91 km^{2} (22.36 sq mi)

Population (2025-01-01)
  - Total: 910
  - Density: 16/km^{2} (41/sq mi)
- Time zone: UTC+1 (CET)
  - Summer (DST): UTC+2 (CEST)
- Website: Official website

Alar del Rey is a municipality located in the province of Palencia, Castile and León, Spain. According to the 2018 census (INE), the municipality has a population of 928 inhabitants.

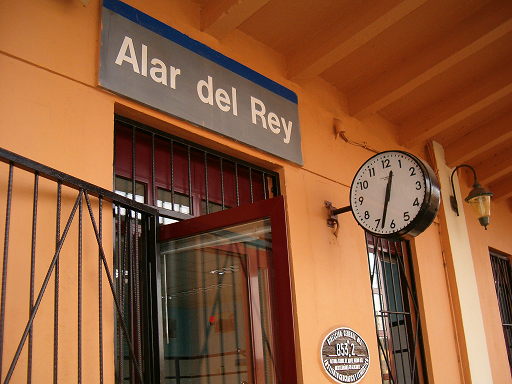
Station of Alar del Rey.
