= Las Cabañas de Castilla =

Coordinates: 42°21′12″N 04°21′52″W

Las Cabañas de Castilla, Spain
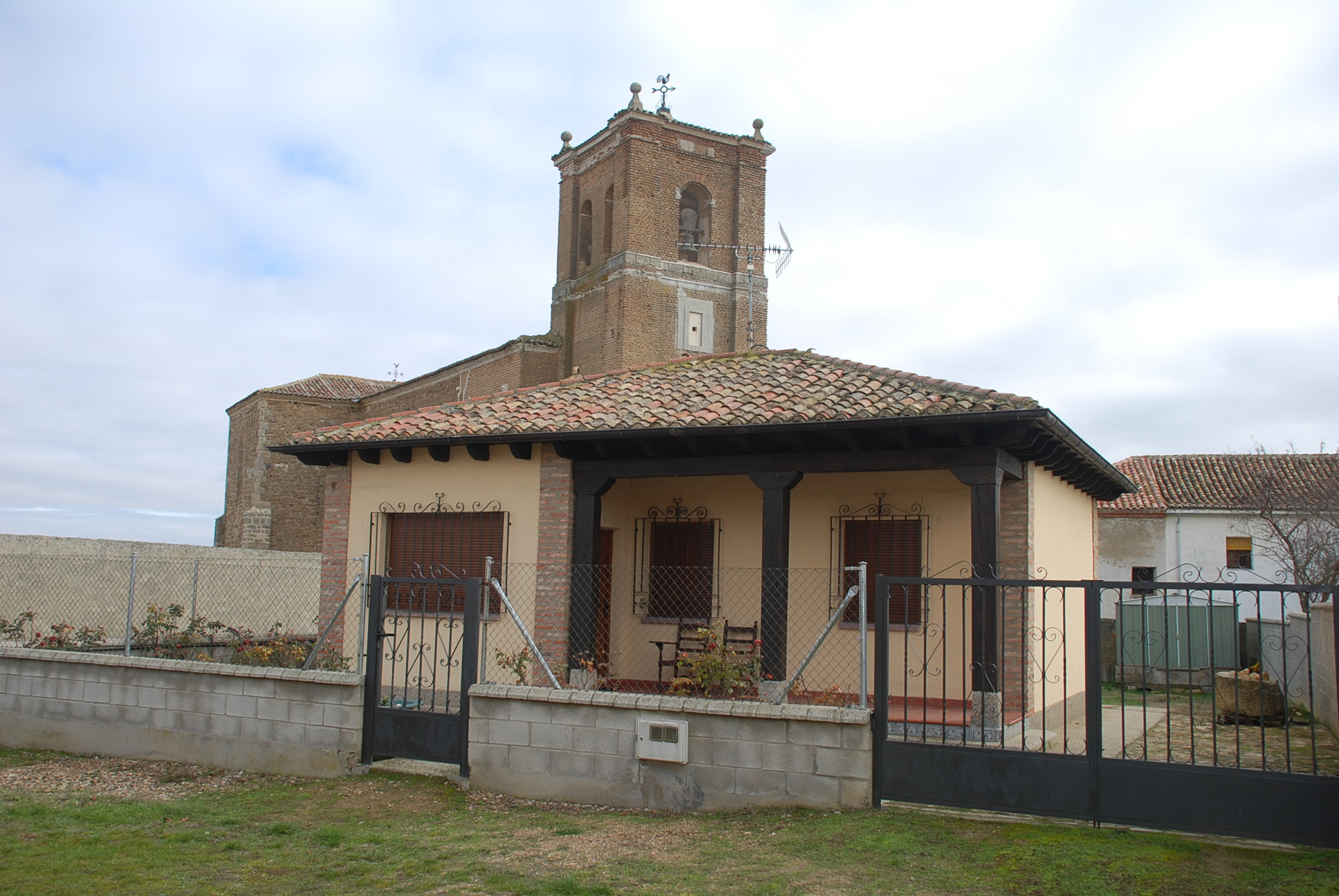

- Seal
- Interactive map of Las Cabañas de Castilla, Spain
- Country: Spain
- Autonomous community: Castile and León
- Province: Palencia
- Municipality: Osorno la Mayor
- Elevation: 806 m (2,644 ft)

Population
  - Total: 40
- Time zone: UTC+1 (CET)
  - Summer (DST): UTC+2 (CEST)
- Website: Castillo de Las Cabañas de Castilla

Las Cabañas de Castilla is a hamlet of Osorno la Mayor located in the province of Palencia, Castile and León, Spain. According to the 2007 census (INE), the village has a population of 40 inhabitants.

== Monuments ==
- Tower of Las Cabañas: Castle built at middle of 15th century by Castaneda family. Besides belonging to Castaneda family, Osorno's Earl and Villatorre's Marqués.
