= Cubillas de Santa Marta =

Coordinates: 41°50′N 4°37′W

Cubillas de Santa Marta, Spain
- Flag Coat of arms
- Interactive map of Cubillas de Santa Marta, Spain
- Country: Spain
- Autonomous community: Castile and León
- Province: Valladolid
- Municipality: Cubillas de Santa Marta

Area
  - Total: 23 km^{2} (8.9 sq mi)

Population (2025-01-01)
  - Total: 394
  - Density: 17/km^{2} (44/sq mi)
- Time zone: UTC+1 (CET)
  - Summer (DST): UTC+2 (CEST)

Cubillas de Santa Marta is a municipality located in the province of Valladolid, Castile and León, Spain. According to the 2004 census (INE), the municipality has a population of 292 inhabitants.

== Gallery ==
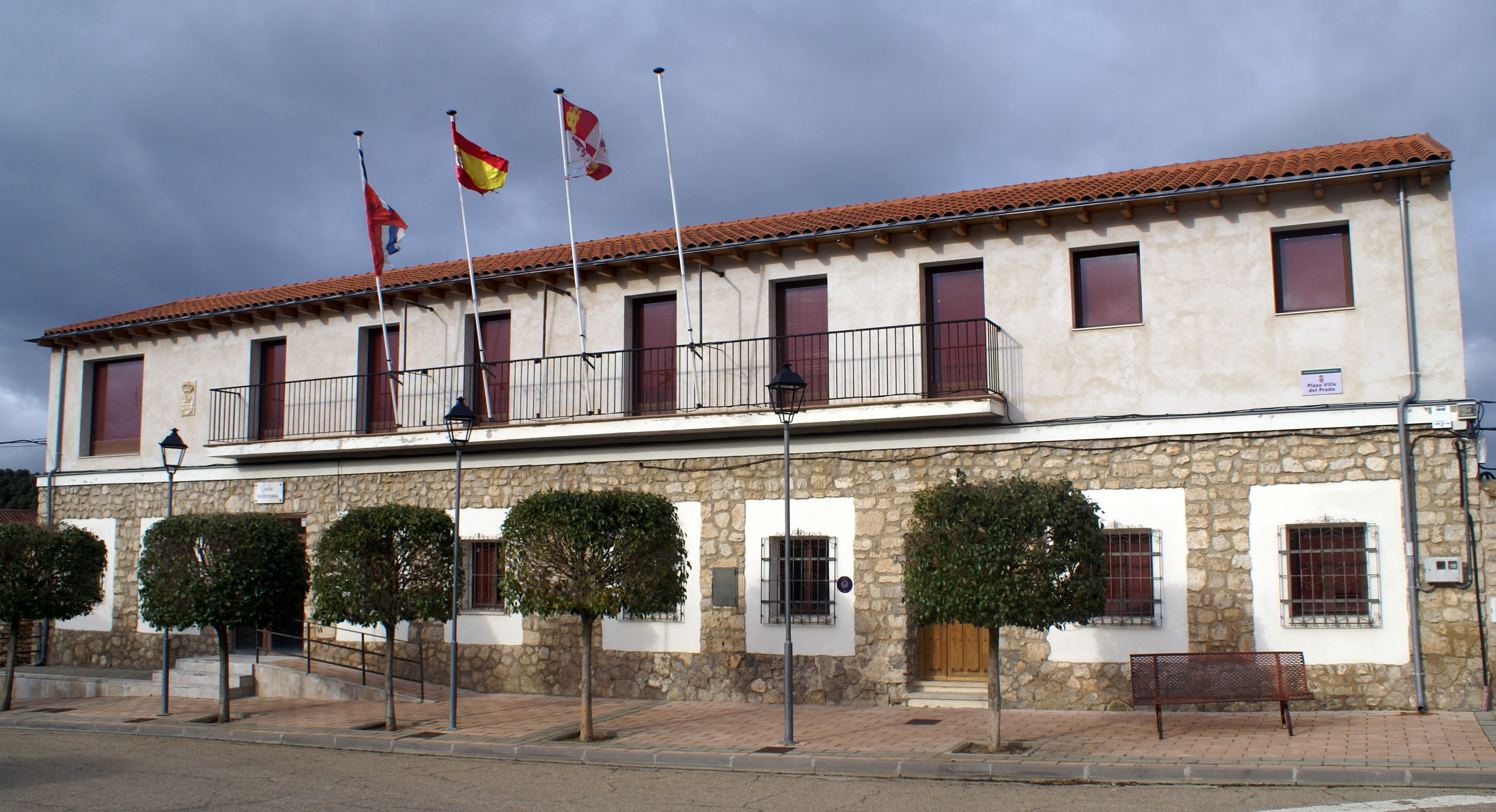
Town hall of Cubillas de Santa Marta
