= Rodrigo González Girón =

Rodrigo González Girón (before 1194 – 1256), eldest son of Gonzalo Rodríguez Girón and his first wife, Sancha Rodríguez, was a nobleman from Palencia. After the death of his father in 1231, he was the head of the Girón family.

== Life ==
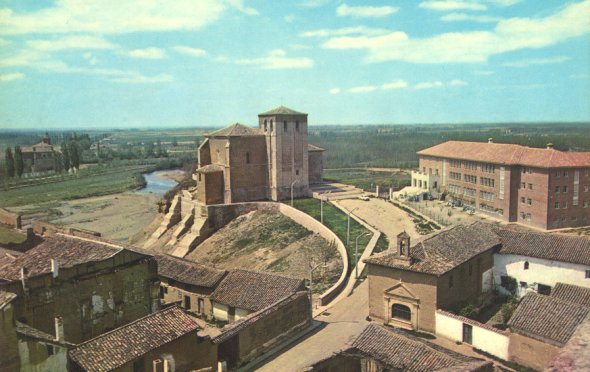
View of Carrión de los Condes

Rodrigo took over many of the tenancies in the Tierra de Campos that his father have formerly governed, including Monzón, half of Carrión and Asturias de Santillana.

He possessed extensive properties in Villarmentero de Campos, Revenga de Campos, Villalonga and Villovieco. In 1232, together with his brother Gonzalo, he reached an agreement with the abbess of the monastery of Santa María la Real de Las Huelgas concerning certain behetrías in these places. (Note: Document 270 in the monastic cartulary: (...) yo don Rodrigo Gonzalvez e yo, Gonzalvo Gonzalves amos hermanos (...) metemos nos amos hermanos nuestro seyellos en ella, et la abadesa el suio.) In 1252, he acquired various estates around Autillo de Campos that he afterwards donated to the Hospital de la Herrada, of which he was a noted patron.

Rodrigo was present with King Fernando III of Castile at the siege of Córdoba (1236) and he accompanied Prince Alfonso (the future Alfonso X) to accept the surrender of the Kingdom of Murcia in 1243. The party entered Murcia on 1 May 1243 and King Muhammad ibn Hud al-Dawla signed the Treaty of Alcaraz handing over his kingdom. On 5 July, Alfonso partitioned the kingdom, granting Elche to Rodrigo as a tenancy. The following he year he revoked it and gave it to his mistress, Mayor Guillén de Guzmán.

Rodrigo played an important role in the conquest of Seville, where he received the village of Villalba, (Note: There is a legend linking the family name Girón to Villalba, which it is said was renamed Gironda by the king when he gave it to Rodrigo. The name did not stick to the town, but it became the name of the family.) which he afterwards donated to the Order of Calatrava. He likewise took the surrender of Carmona when it submitted to Ferdinand. He held the office of mayordomo mayor del rey under Ferdinand III on two separate occasions: from August 1238 until February 1246 and from January 1248 until 1252. His second period in office ended with Ferdinand's death, when Alfonso X named Juan García de Villamayor, the son of his tutors, García Fernández de Villamayor and Mayor Arias, as his mayordomo.

Rodrigo died in 1256 and was interred in the monastery of Santa María de Benavides in a lavish sepulchre sculpted by Roy Martínez de Bureba and now lost.

== Marriage and descendants ==
Rodrigo was married three times. His first wife was María Fróilaz, daughter of Count Froila Ramírez and Urraca González. They first appear together in a charter of 1229 in the monastery of Santa María de Benevívere. From this marriage Rodrigo had at least the following children:

- Pedro Rodríguez Girón, who in 1255 sold to the monastery of Santa María de Matallana some goods in the San Pedro and Falcón quarters of Belmonte de Campos.
- Gómez Rodríguez Girón

By 1243 Rodrigo was married to his second wife, Teresa López, supposedly a daughter of Count Lope Díaz II de Haro and Urraca Alfonso de León. As her arras he gave her some lands in the mountains north of Palencia. (Note: Although it is often said that Inés Rodríguez Girón, wife of Philip of Castile, was born of this union, no documentary evidence of Inés's paternity is known.)

Rodrigo's third wife was Berenguela López de Haro, daughter Lope Díaz II de Haro and Urraca Alfonso. She outlived him and served as his testamentary trustee.

Rodrigo had no issue by either his second or third wife.

== In literature ==
He is the Don Rodrigo referred to in the cantiga de escarnio no. 9 of Alfonso X.

== Bibliography ==
- Barón Faraldo, Andrés (2006). Grupos y dominios aristocráticos en la Tierra de Campos oriental, Siglos X-XIII. Palencia: Monografías. ISBN 84-8173-122-6.
- Estepa Díez, Carlos (2003). Las Behetrías Castellanas, Tomo I. Junta de Castilla y León, Consejería de Cultura y Turismo. ISBN 84-9718-117-4.
- Kinkade, Richard (2020). Dawn of a Dynasty: The Life and Times of Infante Manuel of Castile. University of Toronto Press.
- Linde de Castro, Luis María (2005). Don Pedro Girón, duque de Osuna: la hegemonía española en Europa a comienzos del siglo XVII. Ediciones Encuentro. ISBN 84-7490-7624.
- Veas Arteseros, Francisco; Veas Arteseros, María del Carmen (1986). Alférez Mayor y Mayordomo Real en el siglo XIII. Vol. XIII. pp. 29–48. ISSN 0210-4903.
