= Gonzalo Rodríguez Girón =

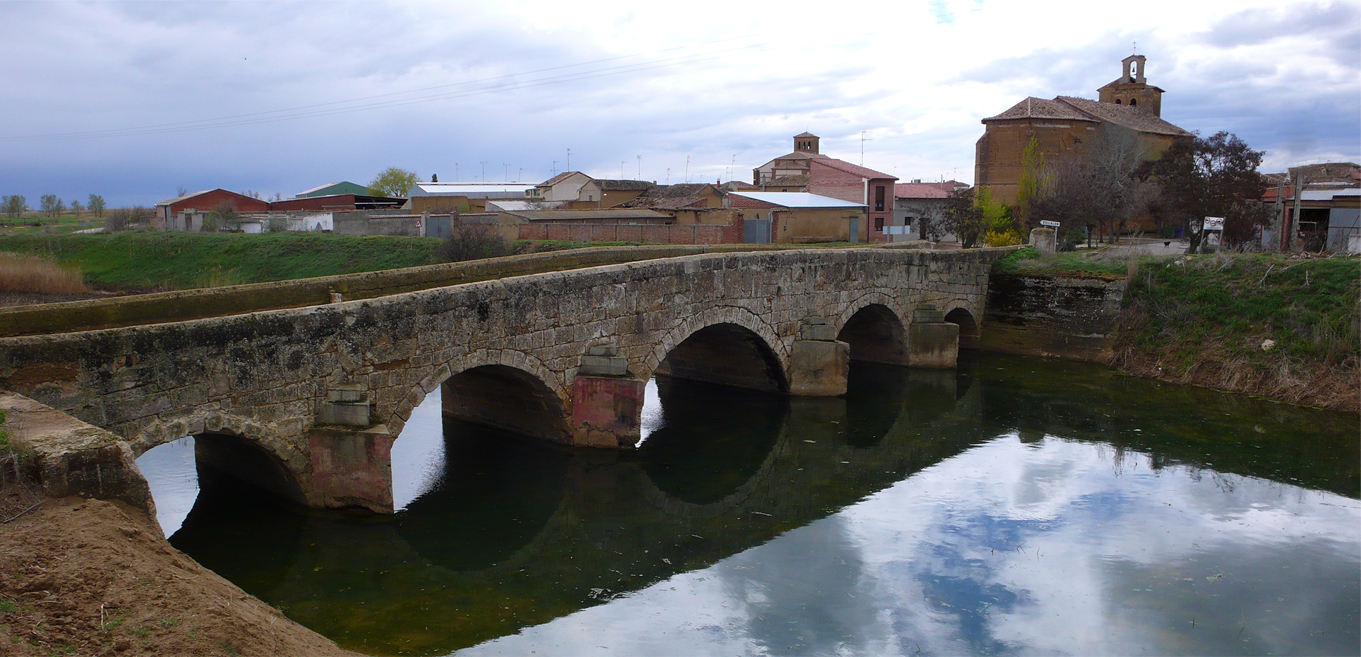
Bridge over the Sequillo River en Boadilla de Rioseco where Gonzalo Rodríguez Girón held lands

Gonzalo Rodríguez Girón (c. 1160–1231), (Note: According to Barón Faraldo, other historians cite the year 1234, probably following Jerónimo Gudiel, hagiographer of the family. Nonetheless, Gonzalo's last documented appearance was in 1231 and from that year he is not known to have held any estates.) also known as Gonzalo Ruiz Girón, firstborn son of Rodrigo Gutiérrez Girón and María de Guzmán, was one of Castile's wealthiest and most powerful nobles. He was based in Tierra de Campos, and was among the most loyal supporters of King Alfonso VIII of Castile, Berengaria of Castile, and later of King Ferdinand III.

== Service to the crown ==
A member of the curia regis of King Alfonso VIII of Castile, he was Mayordomo mayor del Rey (High Steward) from 1198 until the king's death in 1214. Along with his brothers Rodrigo, Pedro, Nuño, and Álvaro, he took part in the Battle of Navas de Tolosa which occurred on 16 July 1212.

After the death of King Alfonso, he was the High Steward of King Henry I until he was replaced on 29 December 1216 by Martín Muñoz de Hinojosa at the urgings of Count Álvaro Núñez de Lara, who in 1215 had made himself the young king's guardian, contrary to the wishes of the church and the nobility. This led to Gonzalo and his supporters distancing themselves from the crown and joining a party of nobles loyal to the king's sister Berengaria.

In February 1216, during the uprising of Álvaro Núñez de Lara, he took part in an extraordinary parliament along with other Castilian nobles including Lope Díaz de Haro, Alfonso Téllez de Meneses "el Viejo", Álvaro Díaz de Cameros, and others, where they agreed, with the support of Berengaria (sister of the young king Henry I), to form a common front against Álvaro Núñez. By the end of May the situation in Castile had become dangerous for Berengaria, so she decided to take refuge in the castle of Autillo de Campos, a property of Gonzalo Rodríguez Girón, and sent her son Fernando to the court of León and his father, King Alfonso IX. On 15 August 1216 a meeting was held among all the nobility of the Kingdom of Castile to try to reach an accord and avoid civil war, but their disagreements led the families of Girón, Téllez de Meneses, and Haro to distance themselves definitively from Álvaro Núñez de Lara.

According to the Crónica latina de los reyes de Castilla, the year 1217 was one of great tension, such as never had occurred in Castile before. Álvaro Núñez de Lara refused to renounce the power he had gained thereto and harassed the forces that remained loyal to Berengaria, laying waste to the valley of Trigueros and besieging Autillo de Campos, where Berengaria and her partisans were located, as well as Cisneros and Frechilla.

Circumstances changed suddenly when King Henry died on 6 June 1217 after receiving a head wound from a roof tile that came loose accidentally while he was playing with other children in the palace of the Bishop of Palencia, Tello Téllez de Meneses. Álvaro Núñez de Lara, as the young king's guardian, tried to keep the matter quiet, bringing the king's body to the castle of Tariego, but he could not prevent the news from reaching Queen Berengaria.

Immediately, Berengaria charged Lope Díaz de Haro, Gonzalo Rodríguez Girón, and Alfonso Téllez de Meneses with the task of discreetly fetching her son Ferdinand, who at the time was in Toro with his father King Alfonso, using as pretext the possibility of an attack on Autillo and without revealing the news of her brother's death. Despite the hesitation of the infantas Sancha and Dulce, the nobles were able to convince the King that King Henry was alive and well, thereupon leaving Toro with Ferdinand. Berengaria, the legitimate heiress to the throne of Castile, renounced it in favor of her son Ferdinand, who shortly thereafter was proclaimed king in Autillo de Campos on 14 June 1217.

On 20 September of that year, Alfonso Téllez de Meneses took Álvaro Núñez de Lara prisoner, and Álvaro was obliged to hand over some fortresses. On 11 November a generous truce was signed, allowing members of the House of Lara to recover their liberty and privileges. As soon as he was released from prison, however, Álvaro once again defied his enemies Alfonso Téllez de Meneses, Gonzalo Rodríguez Girón, and Lope Díaz de Haro, but he died while laying siege to them in the fortress of Castrejón de Trabancos, where they had taken refuge after an initial defeat. His brother Fernando Núñez de Lara made his way to Morocco, where he placed himself in the service of Caliph Yusuf II. The Pact of Toro of 26 August 1218 ratified the truce and put an end to the conflict.

== Political office and landed estates ==
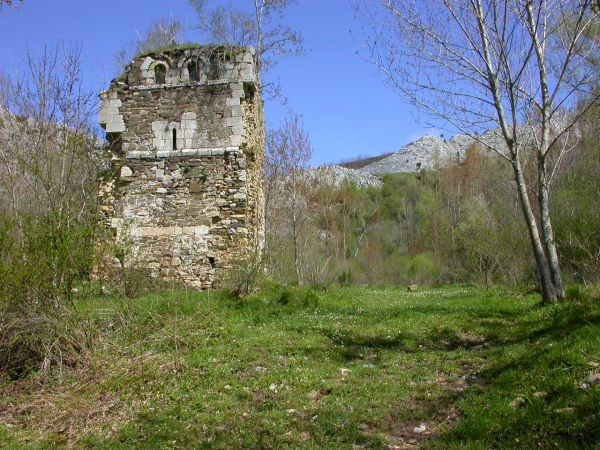
Ruins of the Monastery of San Román de Entrepeñas. The fortified tower, sole vestige of its former splendor, can be seen in the image.

Gonzalo Rodríguez Girón consolidated his position after the kingdom was once again at peace and the threat posed by Count de Lara and his brothers had faded away. He was High Steward for King Ferdinand III and a distinguished member of the curia regis. He held several feudal estates at different times, including Monzón, Liébana, La Pernía, Gatón de Campos, Herrín de Campos, Peñas Negras, Cervera, Guardo, half of the important holding Carrión (shared with his brother Rodrigo Rodríguez Girón), the castle of Torremormojón, where he succeeded his father in 1194, and the distant castle of Entrepeñas, near the Monastery of San Román de Entrepeñas, in Santibáñez de la Peña. He also held several properties in Boadilla de Rioseco, Cardeñosa de Volpejera, Revenga de Campos, Villasabariego de Ucieza, and Cordovilla. In 1221, King Ferdinand repaid Gonzalo for his loyalty and services rendered by granting him the lordship of Autillo de Campos, a favor later granted his descendants by subsequent monarchs.

== Charity ==
In 1209, along with his first wife, he founded the Hospital de la Herrada in the district of San Illodo y San Antonino in Carrión on the Way of Saint James, with the purpose of giving alms and lodging to the pilgrims and treating their illnesses. They entrusted its administration to the Diocese of Palencia.

Gonzalo died around 1231 and was buried in the Hospital de la Herrada that he founded.

== Marriages and descendants ==
He first married, around 1185, Sancha Rodríguez (died between 1209 and 1212). (Note: Sancha last appears in the records in 1209, and Gonzalo remarried in 1212.) In his 1697 study of the Lara family, Luis de Salazar y Castro suggested she was daughter of a Rodrigo Rodríguez appearing in documents without further identifying details, in turn made son of count Rodrigo González de Lara by the infanta Sancha Alfonso. In this he has been followed by many more recent works. However, a recent survey of the Lara by Antonio Sánchez de Mora dismisses this connection as being without basis, a deliberate attempt to give the Girón prominent ancestry. A 13th century pedigree of the patrons of the monastery of Santa María de Ferreira de Pallares states that Gonzalo married the daughter of Rodrigo Fernández de Toroño, alférez to the king, and Aldonza Pérez, daughter of Pedro Muñoz de Carrión, a landholder in Aranga and a descendant of the Banu Gómez and of the Galician nobleman Pedro Froilaz.

An illuminating document, cited by several authors, mentions all of his children from both his marriages, except Gonzalo. On 8 May 1222, in the records of the Palencia Cathedral, Gonzalo, High Steward of the King, in the company of his children and second wife, affirmed that the gift of a hospital in the district of San Zoilo in Carrión, along with all its rights and privileges, was to be restored to Palencia's episcopal see in perpetuity. The children of the first marriage were:

- Rodrigo González Girón (before 1194–1256)
- Gonzalo González Girón (d. 1258), married to Teresa Arias
- Teresa González Girón, who signed the 1222 document with the consent of her husband Rodrigo González (Note: Earlier authors claim that this is Rodrigo González de Ceballos; Salazar y Acha, however, asserts that it could be Rodrigo González de Orbaneja.)
- María González Girón, who signed the document with the consent of her first husband Guillén Pérez de Guzmán, son of Pedro Rodríguez de Guzmán and Mahalda. María, according to Salazar y Acha, married secondly Gil Vasques de Soverosa, and had children from both marriages. A daughter of the first was Mayor Guillén de Guzmán, mistress of King Alfonso X.
- Aldonza González Girón, married by 1222 to Ramiro Fróilaz, son of Count Froila Ramírez and Sancha Fernández.
- Elvira González Girón, who signed the document with the authorization of the abbess of Santa María la Real de Las Huelgas (Note: She appears in 1255 in the documentation of Hospital de la Herrada making a donation of all she owned in Autillo and in Pozuelos de Baquerían.)
- Sancha Rodríguez Girón, another nun, who signed it with the permission of the abbess of San Andrés de Arroyo (Note: In 1269 Sancha, a nun at San Andrés de Arroyo gives Hospital de la Herrada all her properties in Autillo and Pozuelos de Baquerín, mentioning that she was the daughter of don Gonzalo and Sancha Royz.)
- Brígida González Girón, a nun in the Abbey of Santa María de la Consolación de Perales, who signed with the consent of the abbess

Around May 1213, Gonzalo married, for the second time, Marquesa Pérez, who may have come from the Villalobos or the Manzanedo family, although her parentage has not been confirmed. (Note: In the records of King Ferdinand III, it is mentioned that Gonzalo granted his second wife a carta de arras (bridal endowment) on 13 May 1213 which included half of his possessions in Cisneros, Pozuelo, Baquerín de Campos, Petilla, Vega de Doña Olimpa, Quintanilla de Onsoña, Espinosa, and Valdetrigueros.) (Note: In August of 1214, Gonzalo accepted Marquesa's provision to bind Villa del Rey to the endowment of the Hospital de la Herrada pending payment of 460 maravedíes, mentioning his first wife Sancha and also that Marquesa had loaned him money to repay a sum owed by Teresa, daughter of his first wife.) Together they signed a document of 1222 mentioning the children of this marriage, all of whom were minors at that date. In 1224, along with his wife Marquesa, he donated the church of Santa María de Baquerín to the Hospital de la Herrada which he had founded. The children of this second marriage, who lack the historical relevance of the first, were:

- Pedro González Girón
- Muño González Girón
- Nuño González Girón
- María González Girón (thus bearing the same name as her elder half-sister), wife of Ponce I, Count of Urgell, with whom she had two children; Ermengol and Álvaro who inherited a significant legacy in the kingdoms of Castile and León (Note: She appears in 1266 with the title of Countess of Urgel making a donation to Hospital de La Herrada of her properties in Becerril de Campos.)
- Leonor González Girón, who married, according to Luis de Salazar y Castro, Gonzalo Gómez de Roa, Lord of Aza and Roa, with whom she had three children, one of whom, Juan González de Roa, became Grand Master of the Order of Calatrava
- Inés González Girón
- Mayor González Girón, possibly the wife of Lope López de Haro "el Chico" son of Lope Díaz II de Haro. (Note: In 1290, her daughter Inés López, granted Hospital de La Herrada all her properties in Autillo de Campos, Fuentes de Nava, and Becerril, mentioning that she was the granddaughter of Gonzalo Rodríguez and daughter of Mayor González.) (Note: On 10 September 1295, Berenguela López, abbess at the Monastery of Santa María la Real de Las Huelgas, mentions that she is the daughter of Don López el Chico and Mayor González.)

Preceded by Pedro García de Lerma	High Steward of the King of Castile; 1198–1216	Succeeded by Martín Muñoz de Hinojosa
Preceded by Martín Muñoz de Hinojosa	High Steward of the King of Castile; 1217–1231	Succeeded by García Fernández de Villamayor

== Bibliography ==
- Barón Faraldo, Andrés (2006). Grupos y dominios aristocráticos en la Tierra de Campos oriental, Siglos X-XIII (in Spanish). Palencia: Monografías. ISBN 84-8173-122-6.
- Estepa Díez, Carlos (2003). Las Behetrías Castellanas (in Spanish). Junta de Castilla y León, Consejería de Cultura y Turismo. ISBN 84-9718-117-4.
- Fernández-Xesta y Vázquez, Ernesto (2001). Relaciones del condado de Urgel con Castilla y León (in Spanish). E&P Libros Antiguos, S.L. ISBN 84-87860-37-0.
- Lizoain Garrido, José Manuel (1985). Documentación del Monasterio de Las Huelgas de Burgos (1116-1230) (in Spanish). Ediciones J.M. Garrido Garrido. ISBN 84-86371-02-3.
- Ruiz Gómez, Francisco (2003). Los orígenes de las órdenes militares y la repoblación de los territorios de La Mancha (1150-1250) (in Spanish). Consejo Superior de Investigaciones Científicas. ISBN 84-00-08159-5.
- Salazar y Acha, Jaime de (1989). "Los descendientes del conde Ero Fernández, fundador de Monasterio de Santa María de Ferreira de Pallares". El Museo de Pontevedra (in Spanish) (43): 67–86. ISSN 0210-7791.
- Salazar y Castro, Luis de (1697). Historia Genealógica de la Casa de Lara: Justificada con Instrumentos y Escritores de Inolvidable Fe (in Spanish). Mateo de Llanos y Guzman.
- Sánchez de Mora, Antonio (2003). La nobleza castellana en la plena Edad Media: el linaje de Lara (SS. XI–XIII) (Ph.D.) (in Spanish). Universidad de Sevilla.
- Veas Arteseros, Francisco; Veas Arteseros, María del Carmen (1986). "Alférez Mayor y Mayordomo Real en el siglo XIII". Miscelánea Medieval Murciana, Área de Historia Medieval (in Spanish). XIII: 29–48. ISSN 0210-4903. Archived from the original on 2009-12-25.
