= Hospital de la Herrada =

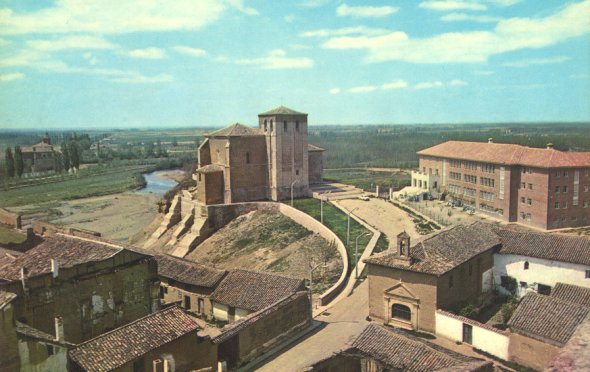
- Former site of hospital in Carrión de los Condes in 2020

Geography
- Location: Carrión de los Condes, Palencia, Spain
- Coordinates: 42.009193°N 4.527641°W (approximate)

Organisation
- Type: Assistance to pilgrims
- Patron: Gonzalo Rodríguez Girón

History
- Opened: 1209

Links
- Lists: Hospitals in Spain

The Hospital de la Herrada, also Hospital de Santa María de la Herrada was a hospital and college in the town of Carrión de los Condes, Palencia, Spain, established in 1209 by Gonzalo Rodríguez Girón, a Palencia tycoon who became steward of the king, to provide assistance to pilgrims on the Way of St James and other travelers.

The hospital and Giron appear to have had considerable power in the medieval period. Three years after its founding, Girón made a provision to the Bishop Tello Téllez and his council, with estates and belongings such as the churches of Cordovilla, mills, orchards, fields and vineyards of Villanueva del Rebollar, Cardeñosa de Volpejera, Revenga de Campos, Villasabariego de Ucieza, Villaturde and Boedo de Castrejón. Later in the thirteenth century, the Hospital granted a charter of Villaturde (1278), Quintanilla de Onsoña (1292) and Vega de Doña Olimpa (1324). In 1324, the Hospital granted a charter to statutory Vega de Doña Olimpa.

Nothing remains of it now, but it is known that it was located in an area that is known as today as "la huerta de la Herrada".
