= Church of Santiago (Carrión de los Condes) =

Church in Carrión de los Condes, Spain

Coordinates: 42°20′18″N 4°36′12″W

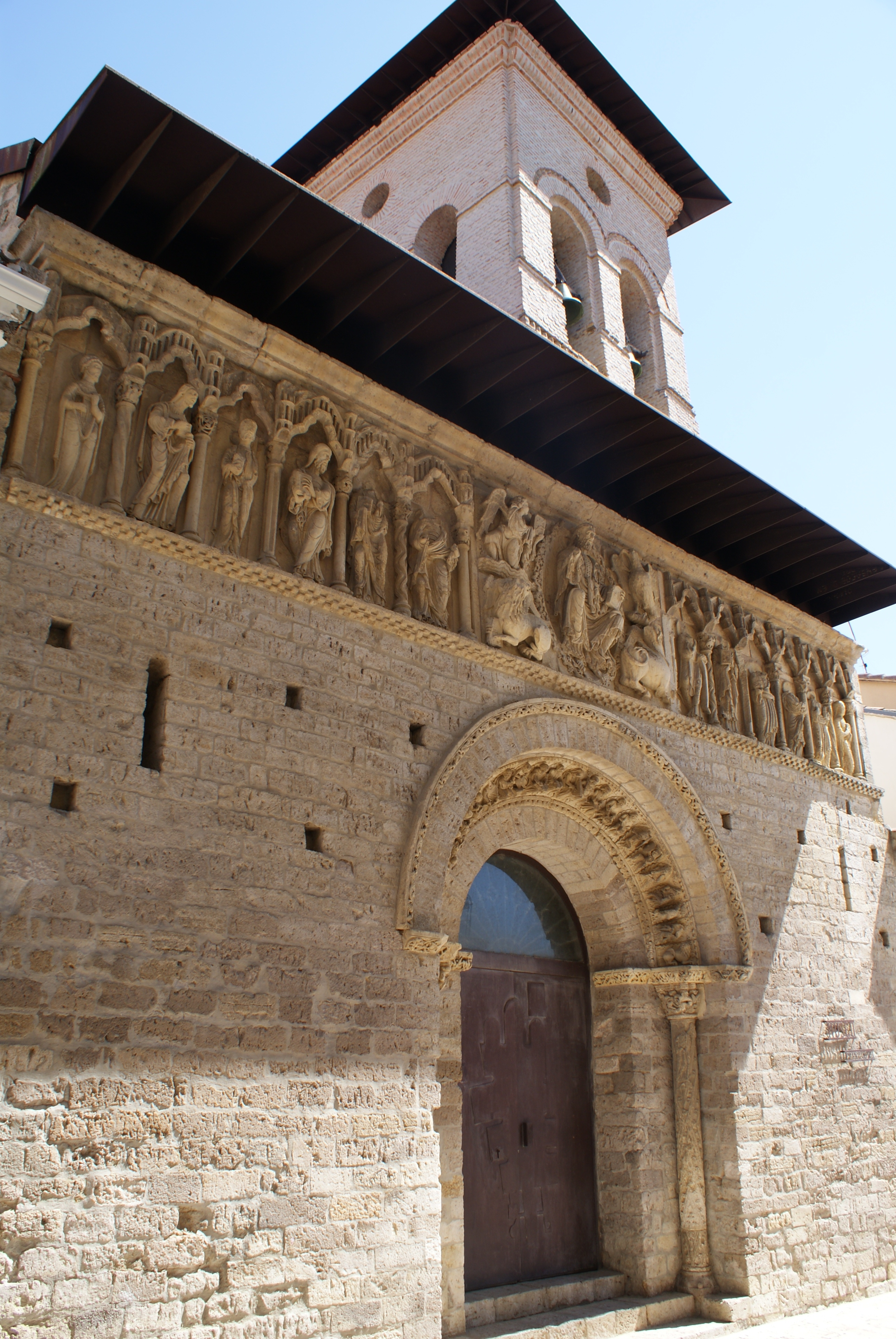
The church of Santiago

The Church of Santiago is located on the north-eastern corner of the main square of the town of Carrión de los Condes (province of Palencia), Spain. The church stands on the main street that crosses the city following the Camino de Santiago and was built in the middle of the 12th century. It has suffered several alterations over the centuries, including a major fire in 1811, which have resulted in a mixture of architectural styles throughout the church. The western façade was built around 1160-1170 and is one of the culminating points of the Romanesque art in Spain.

== The western façade ==
The western façade is made of three archivolts that are decorated with sculpture. The archivolt in the middle contains 24 voussoirs with sculptures of medieval craftsmen, musicians and dancers, that show with great detail the clothes and instruments that corresponded to each craft. The archivolts stand on decorated capitals that are in turn supported by columns with spiral decorations.

The sculpted frieze above the doorway shows Christ Pantocrator sitting in majesty within a mandorla, typical of Romanesque sculpture. He is surrounded by the symbols of the Four Evangelists, the Tetramorph. On each side of the Christ, the Apostles stand under small multifoil arches. This frieze is likely the work of two different sculptors. The result are highly plastic sculptural compositions with their dramatic gestures and arrangements, their expressive use of texture and line. In these sculptures deep undercutting and effusive drapery establish an expressiveness that is at once moving and exhilarating

== The interior ==
The interior originally consisted of three naves but only one nave remains in the current layout. The small museum contains some religious works of the 15th and 16th centuries.

== Gallery ==
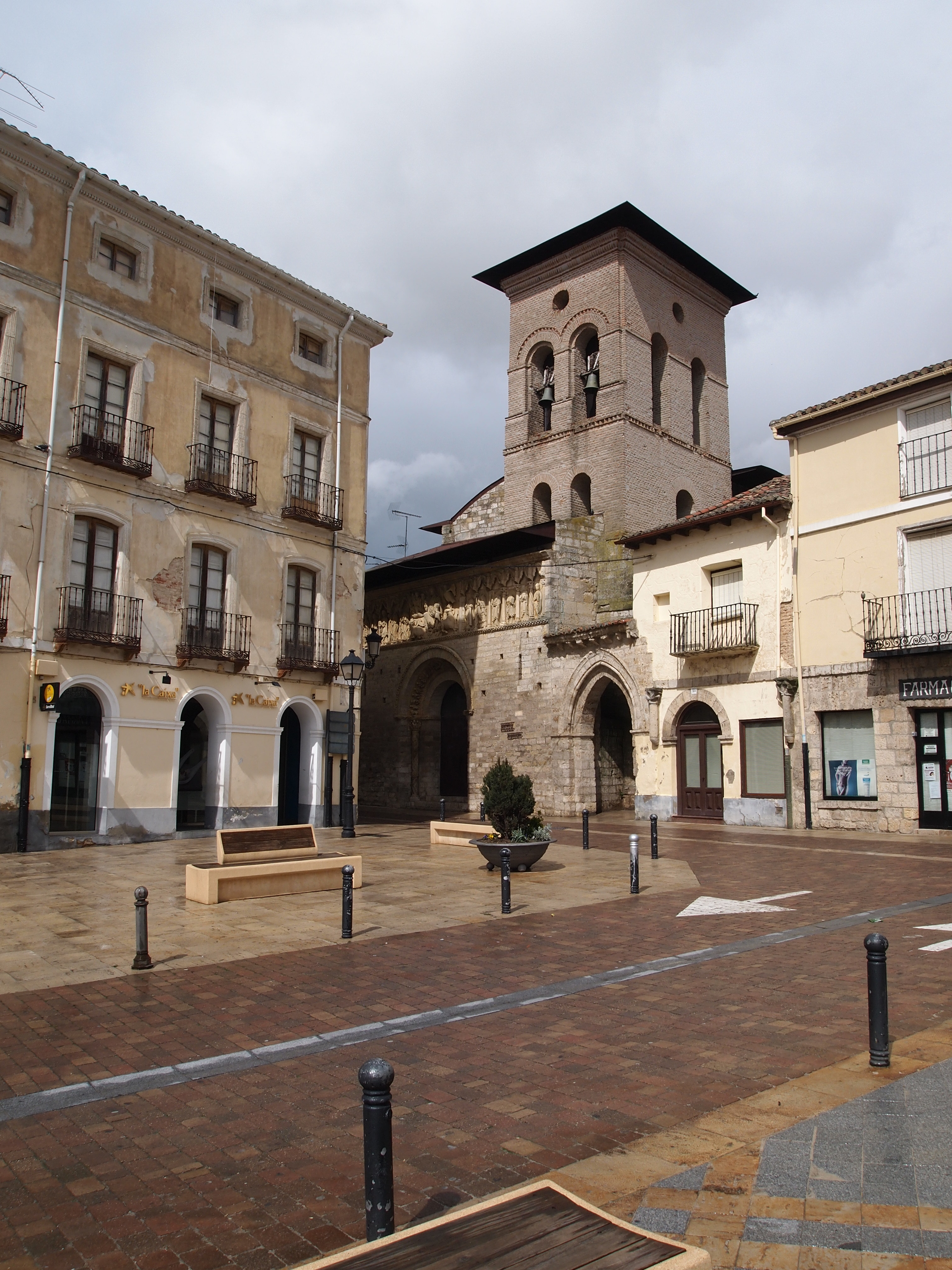
The church of Santiago

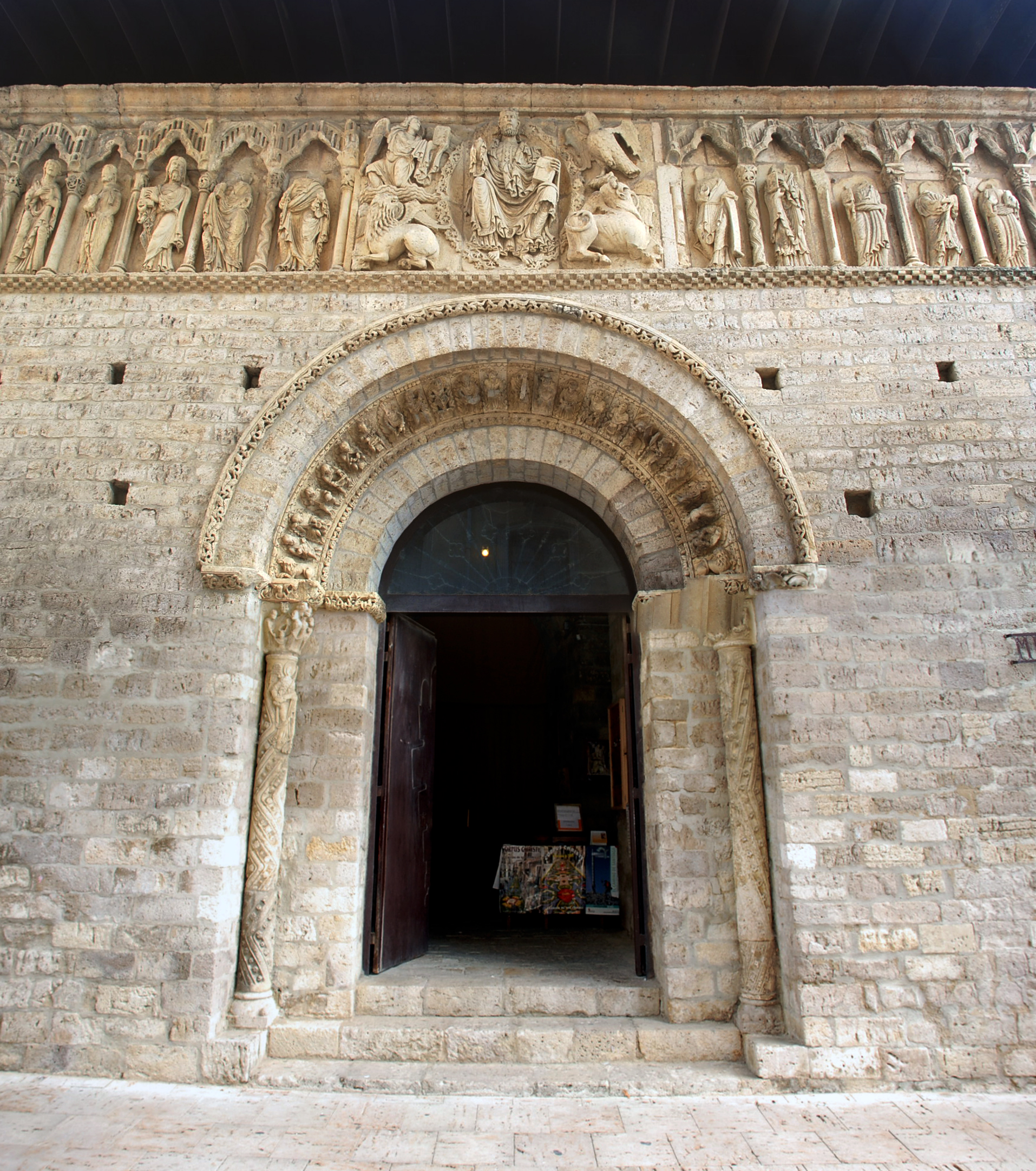
The western facade

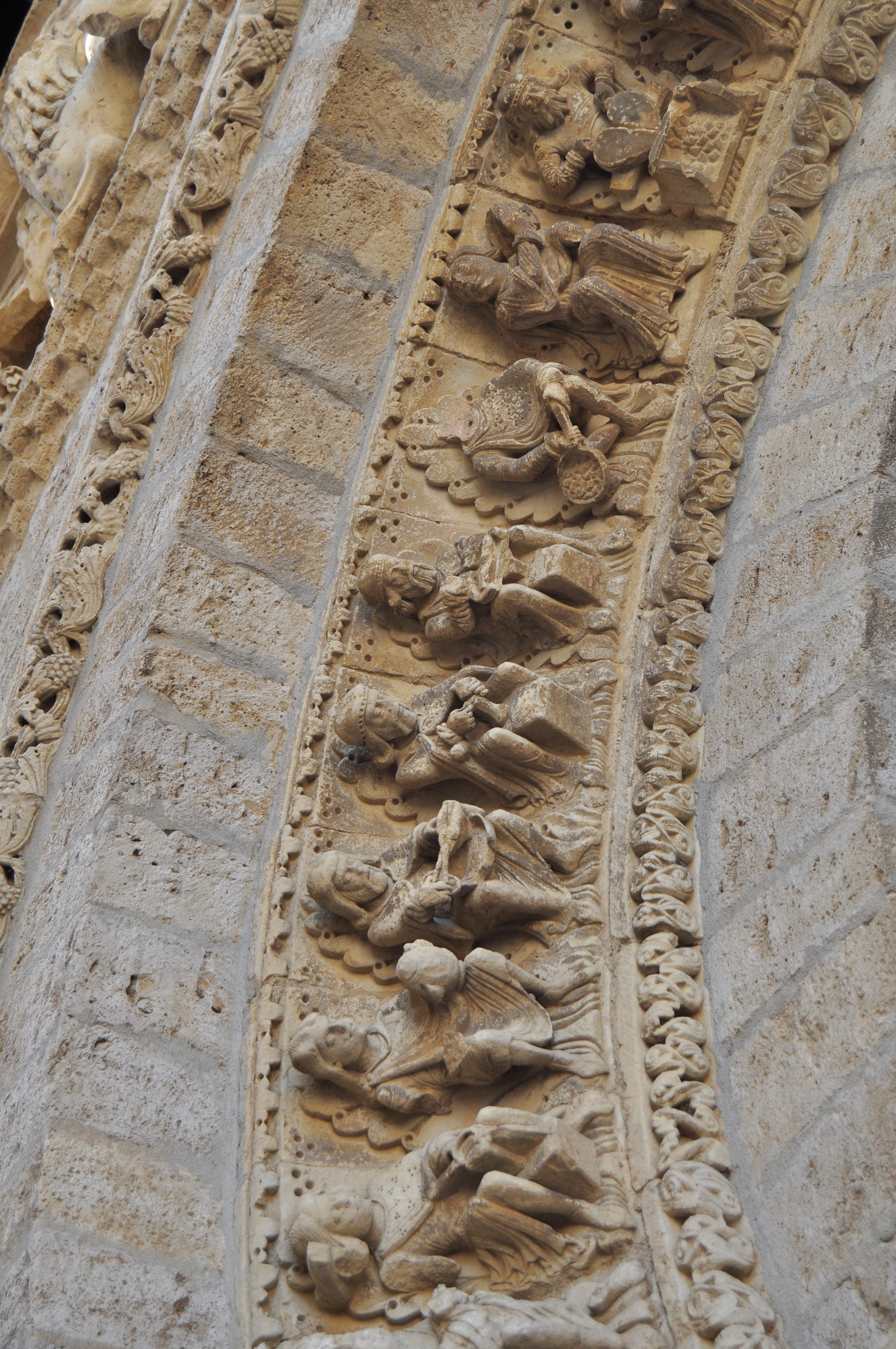
A detail of the craftsmen on the archivolt

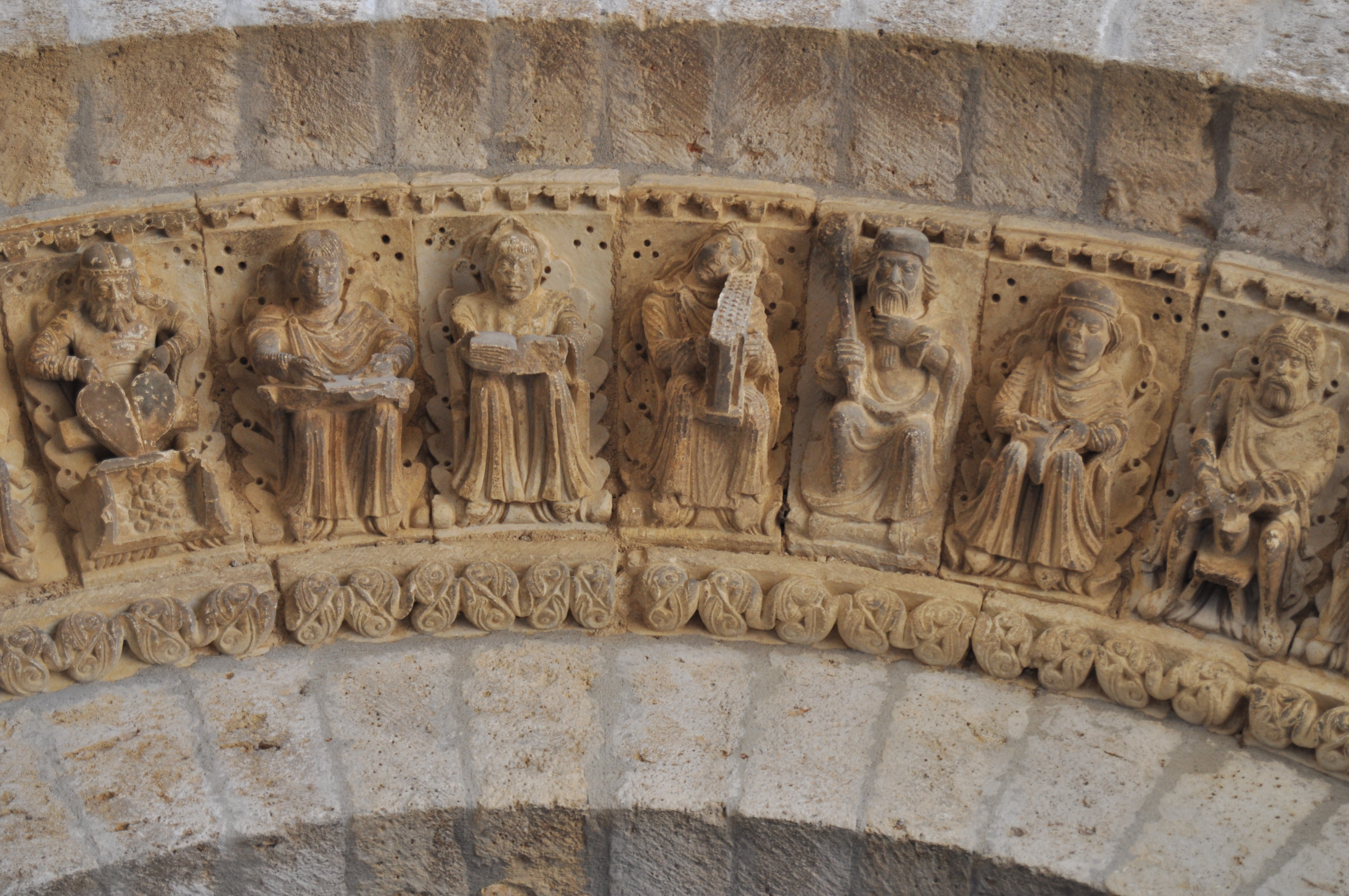
A detail of musicians and craftsmen on the archivolt

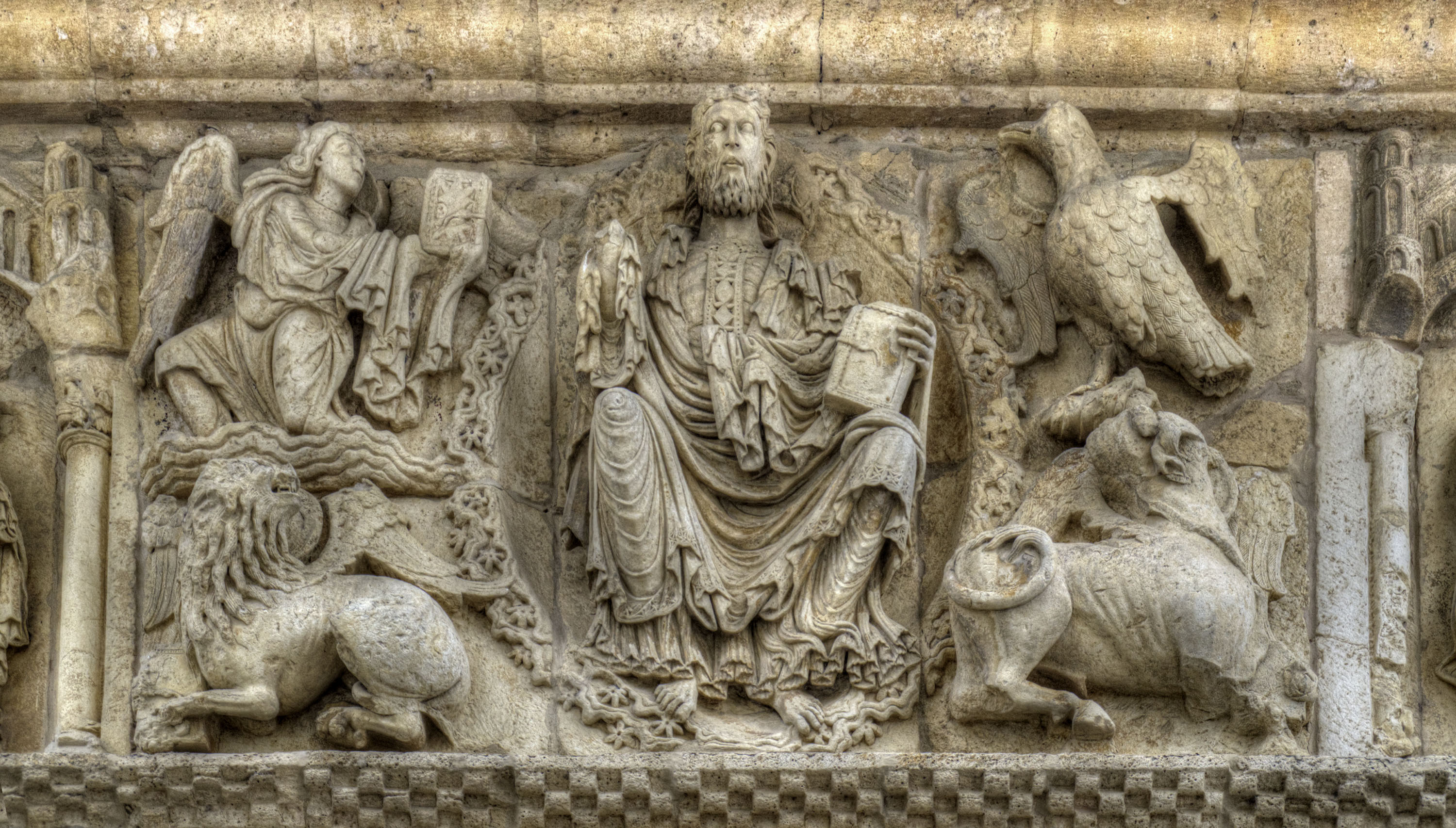
Christ Pantocrator surrounded by the symbols of the Four Evangelists

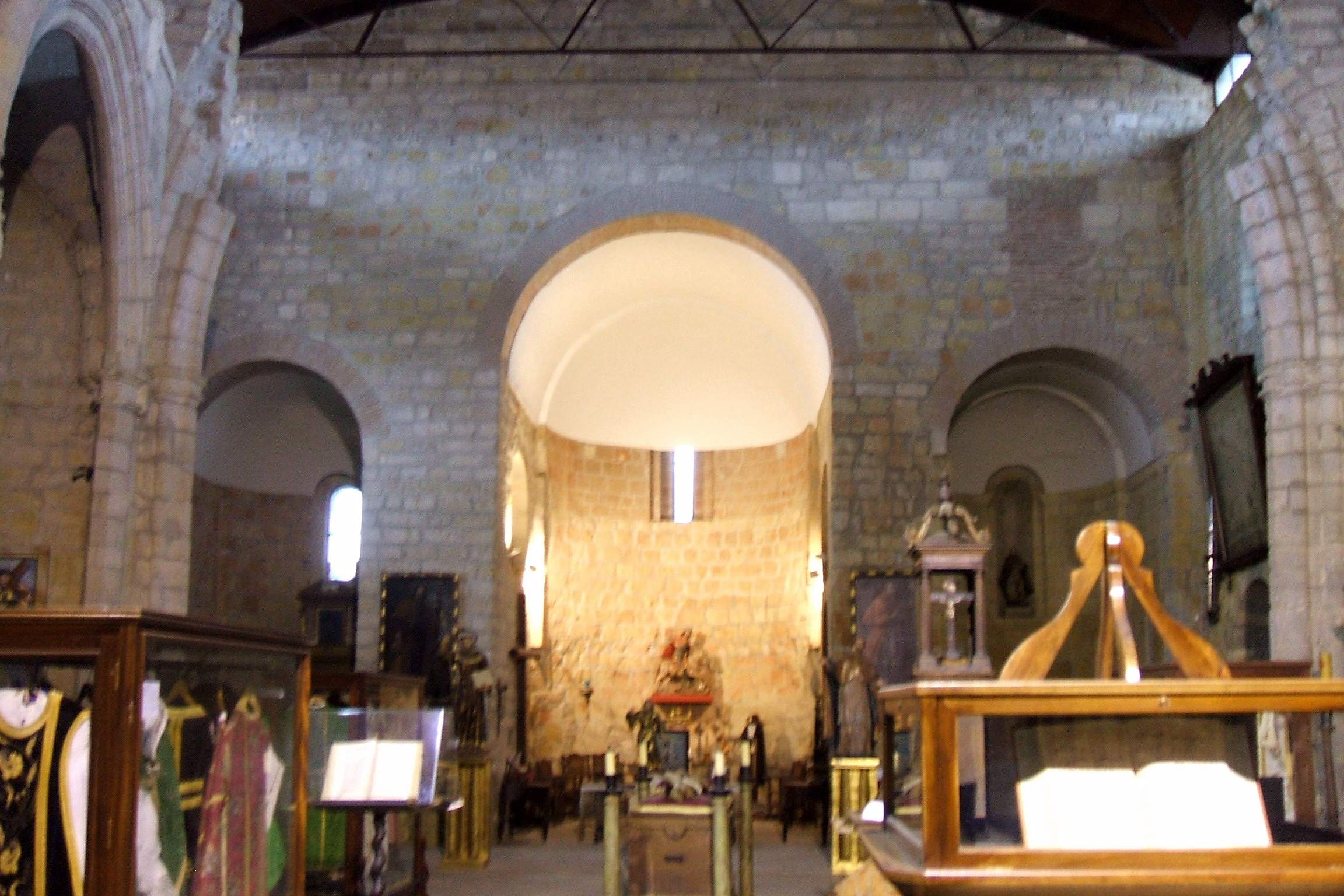
The interior of the church
