= Carrión de los Condes =

- Municipality
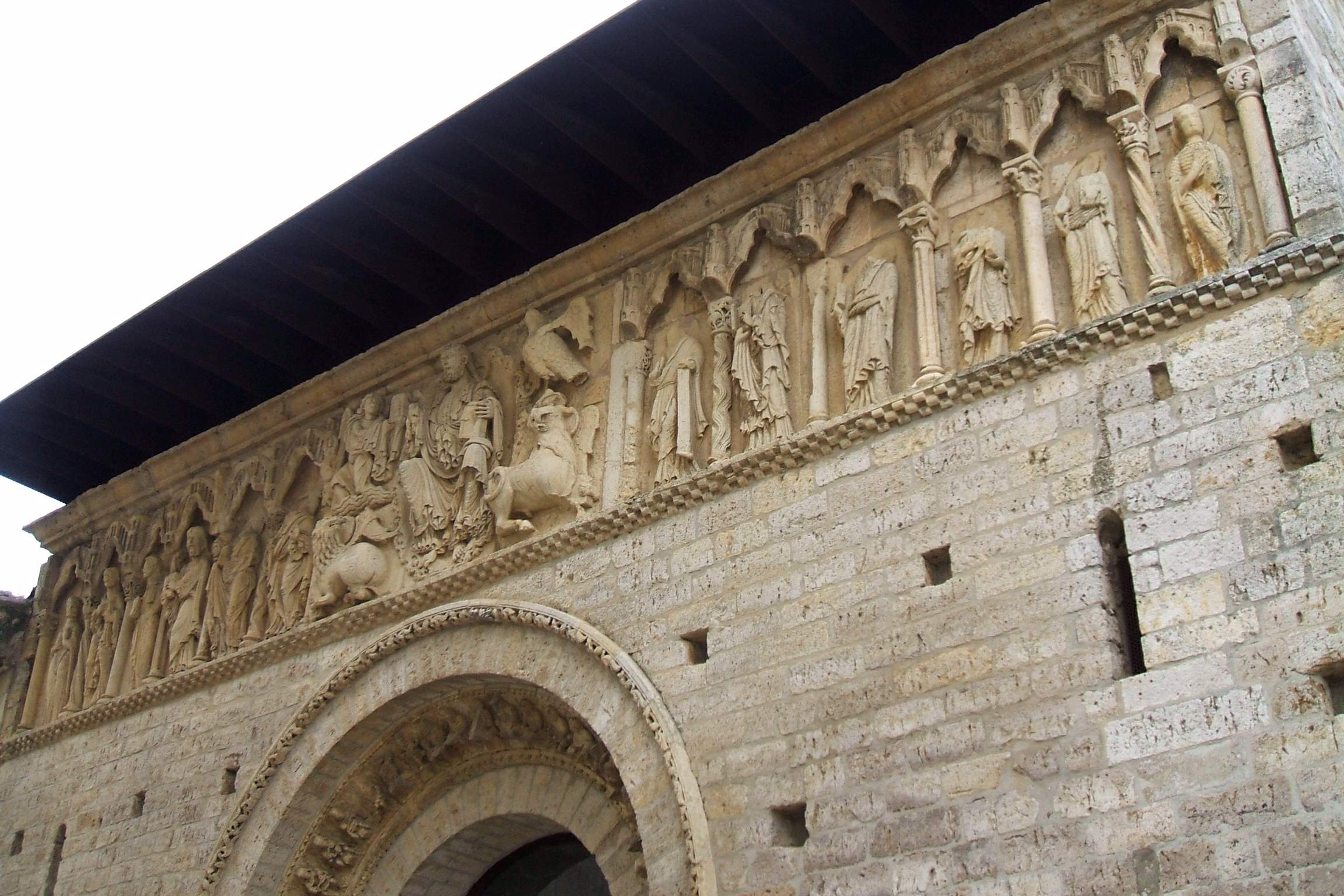
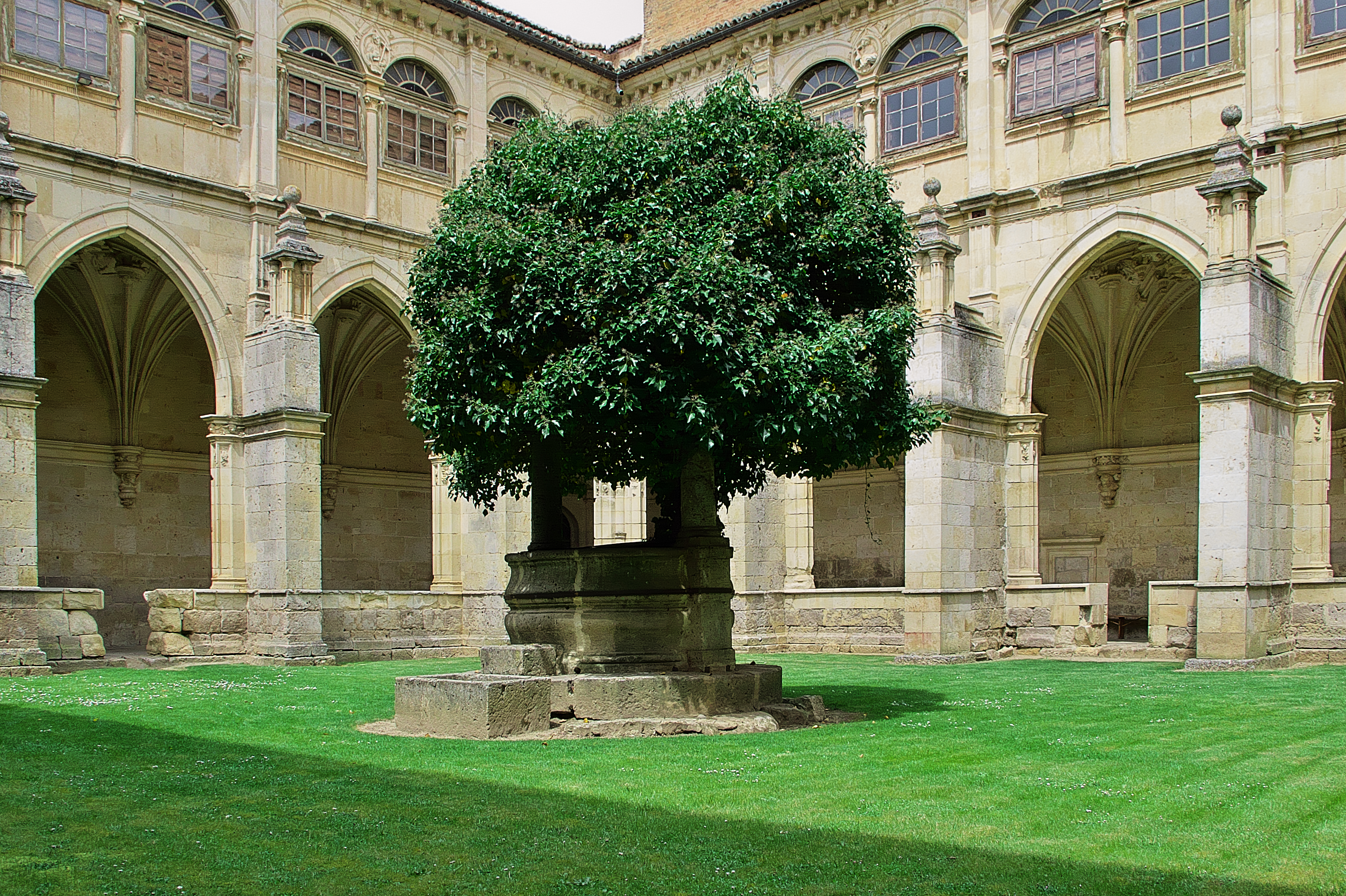
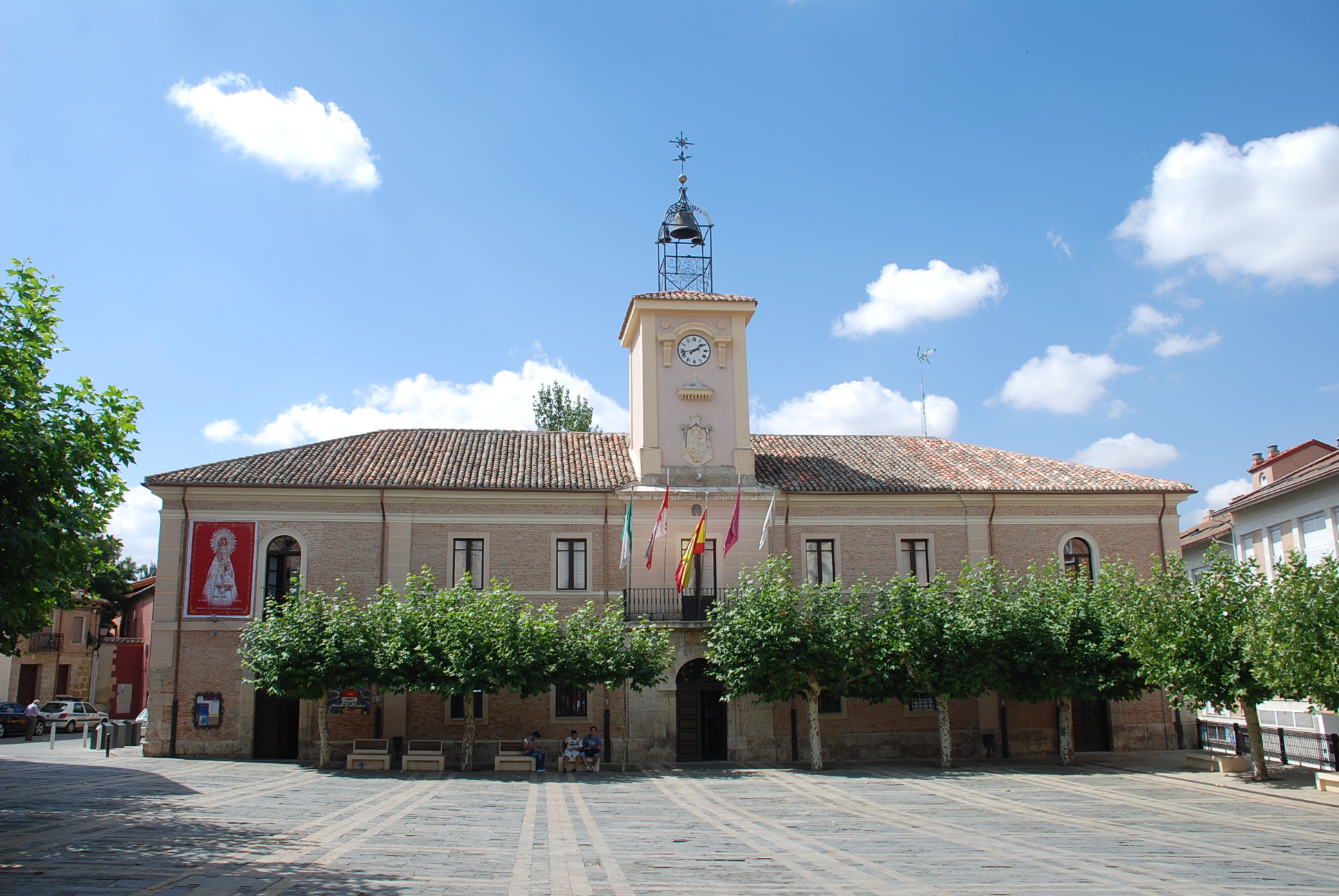
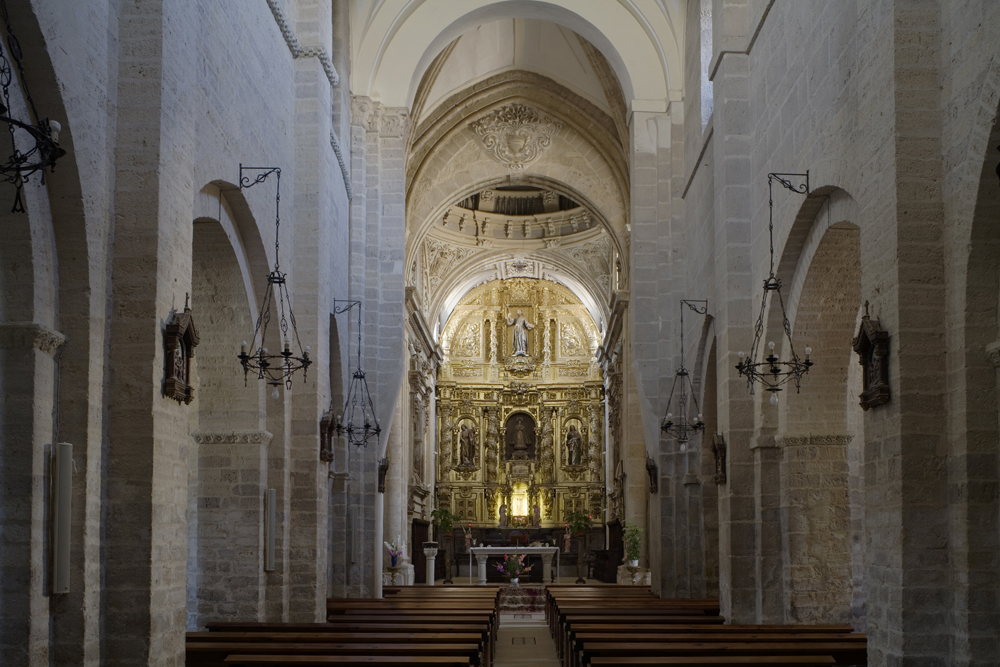
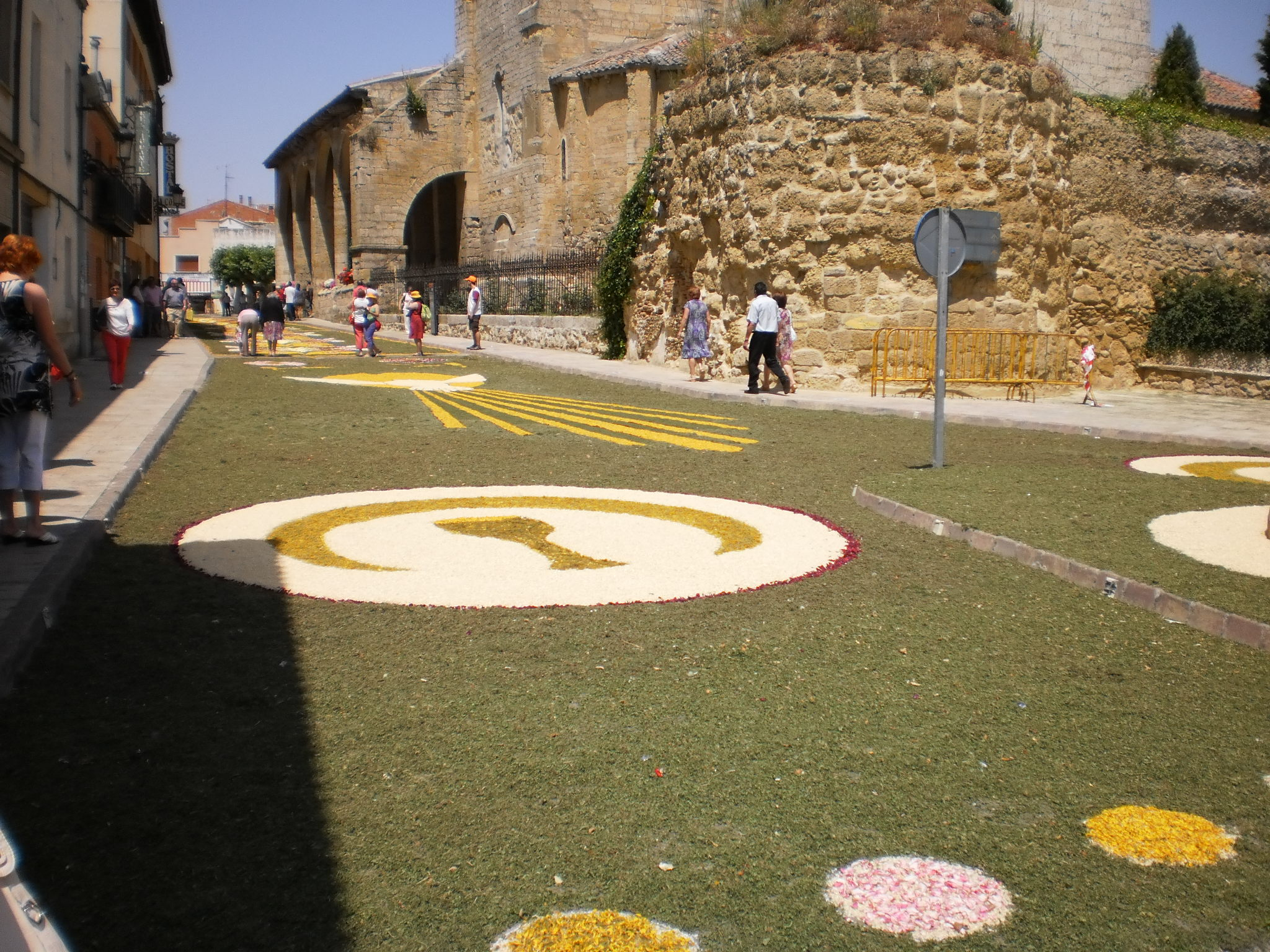
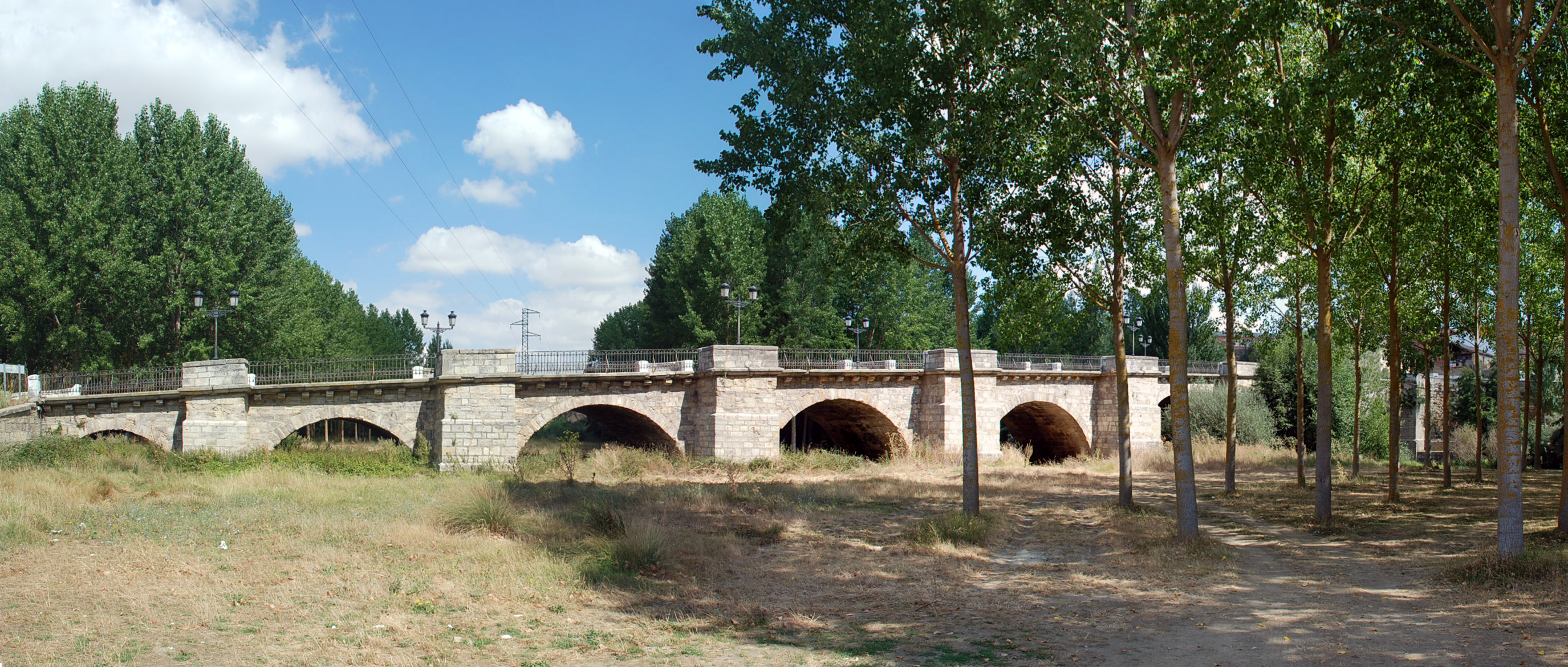

- Flag Coat of arms

- Location in Spain
- Coordinates: 42°20′N 4°36′W
- Country: Spain
- Autonomous community: Castile and León
- Province: Palencia
- Comarca: Tierra de Campos

Government
  - Mayor: Luis Miguel Medina (Partido Popular (PP))

Area
  - Total: 63.37 km^{2} (24.47 sq mi)
- Elevation: 830 m (2,720 ft)

Population (2025-01-01)
  - Total: 1,997
  - Density: 31.51/km^{2} (81.62/sq mi)
- Demonym(s): carrionés, carrionesa
- Time zone: UTC+1 (CET)
  - Summer (DST): UTC+2 (CEST)
- Postal code: 34120
- Website: Official website

Carrión de los Condes (Spanish pronunciation: [kaˈrjon de los ˈkondes]) is a municipality in the province of Palencia, part of the Autonomous Community of Castile and León, Spain.

Situated on the River Carrión, it is 40 kilometers upstream from the provincial capital of Palencia, on the French Way of the Way of Saint James.

== History ==
Carrión de los Condes was taken from the Moors by Alonso Carreño around 791–842. Don Carreño took the name Carrión at this time.

Carrión de los Condes was the home of Diego and Fernán González, fictitious sons-in-law of El Cid in the poem El Cantar de Mio Cid (English: The Song of My Cid).

In 1072, after losing the nearby Battle of Golpejera, Alfonso VI of León took refuge in Carrion's Church of Santa María de las Victorias, (or Santa Maria del Camino.) Alfonso ultimately chose exile, where he sought refuge in Toledo, which was then in Moorish hands.

In 1209, Hospital de la Herrada was established by Gonzalo Rodríguez Girón, a Palencia tycoon who became steward of the king, to provide assistance to the Jacobean pilgrims and other travelers. It had considerable influence and power in the area in the 13th and 14th centuries.

== Jewish presence in Carrión ==
The town was inhabited by Jews at an early date. Although they outnumbered the Christians both in numbers and in property, they submitted in 1126 to the victorious King Alfonso VII, who showed himself favourably disposed towards them.

In 1160 many of them settled in the neighbouring city of Palencia.

The Jewish community of Carrion was so large in 1290 that it paid 92,000 maravedis in taxes, not much less than the amount paid by the community of Burgos. In Carrion, as elsewhere, the Jews were persecuted. Delegates from the city appeared before King Alphonso of Castile (probably Alfonso the Wise), informing him that the Christians of the city, because of a groundless suspicion, had risen against the Jews and killed two of them; that thereupon the Jews had sought refuge in the palace of the prince, who was absent at the time, and, when the Christians followed in pursuit, had escaped through a secret door leading into the court, and locked their pursuers in.

== Main sights ==
- Church of Santa María de las Victorias, (or Santa Maria del Camino) 12th century, in Romanesque style
- Romanesque church of Santiago, 12th century. It houses the Pantocrator, considered a masterpiece of Romanesque sculpture.
- Monastery of Santa Clara, 13th century
- Monastery of San Zoilo (11th-16th centuries) with a Plateresque Cloister.
- Romanesque tombs of the Counts that lived there.
- Churches of Belén, San Andrés and San Julián
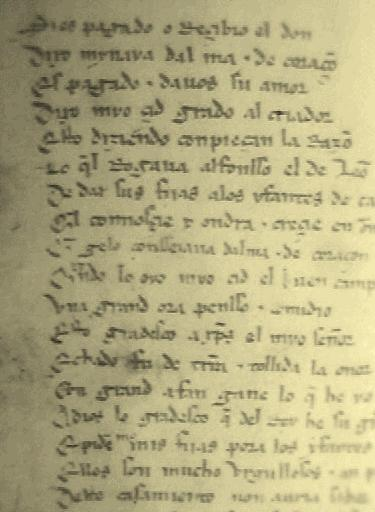
A page of the poem The Lay of the Cid, in which second and third books the fictitious Infantes de Carrión (Princes of Carrión) play an anthagonistic role.

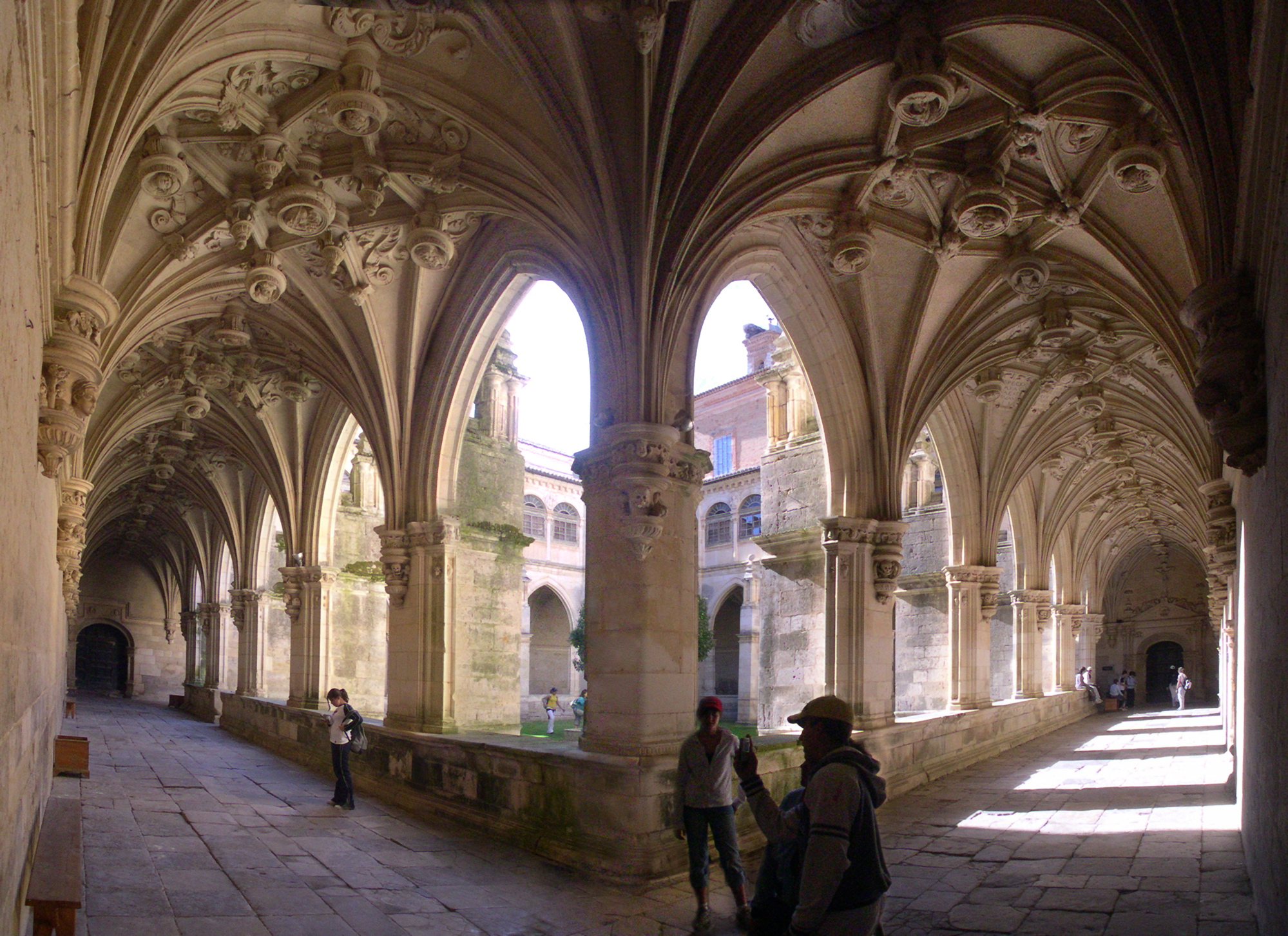
Monastery of San Zoilo's Cloister

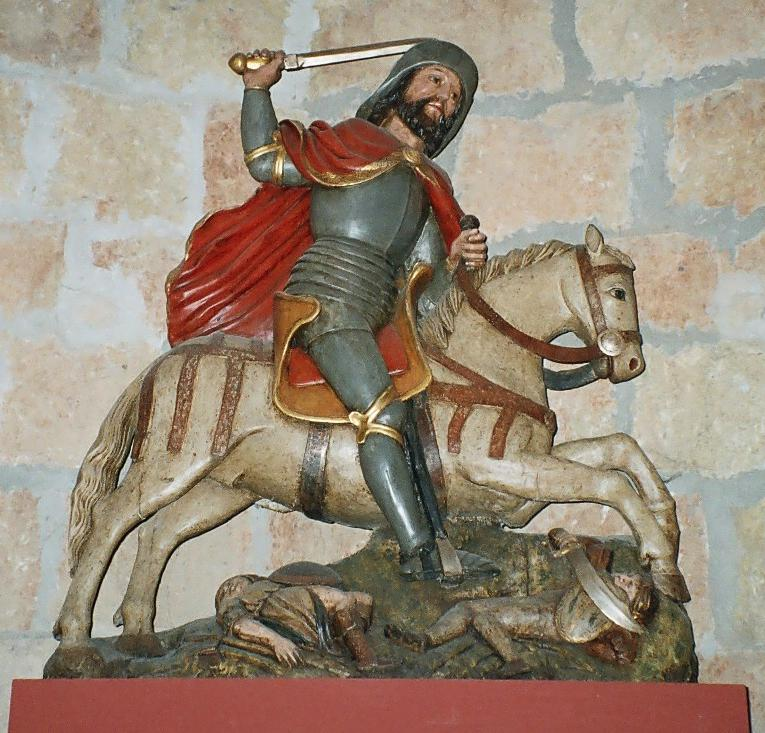
Statue of Saint James as a moor-slayer

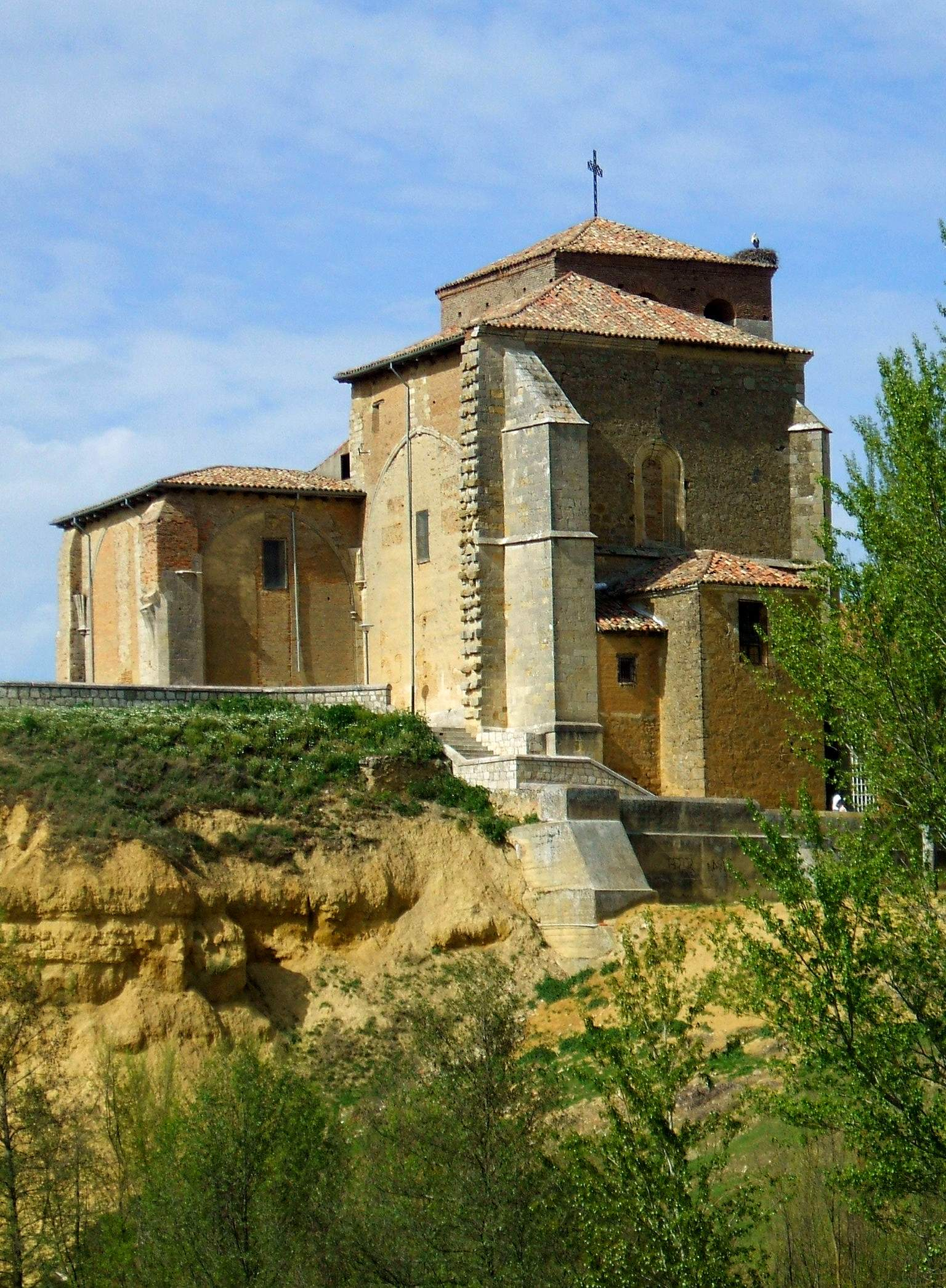
Church of Belén, built in the 16th and 17th centuries

== Twin towns ==
- Carrión de los Céspedes, Spain
- Carrión de Calatrava, Spain

== See also ==
- Carrión River
