= Villarmentero de Campos =

Coordinates: 42°18′N 4°30′W

- municipality
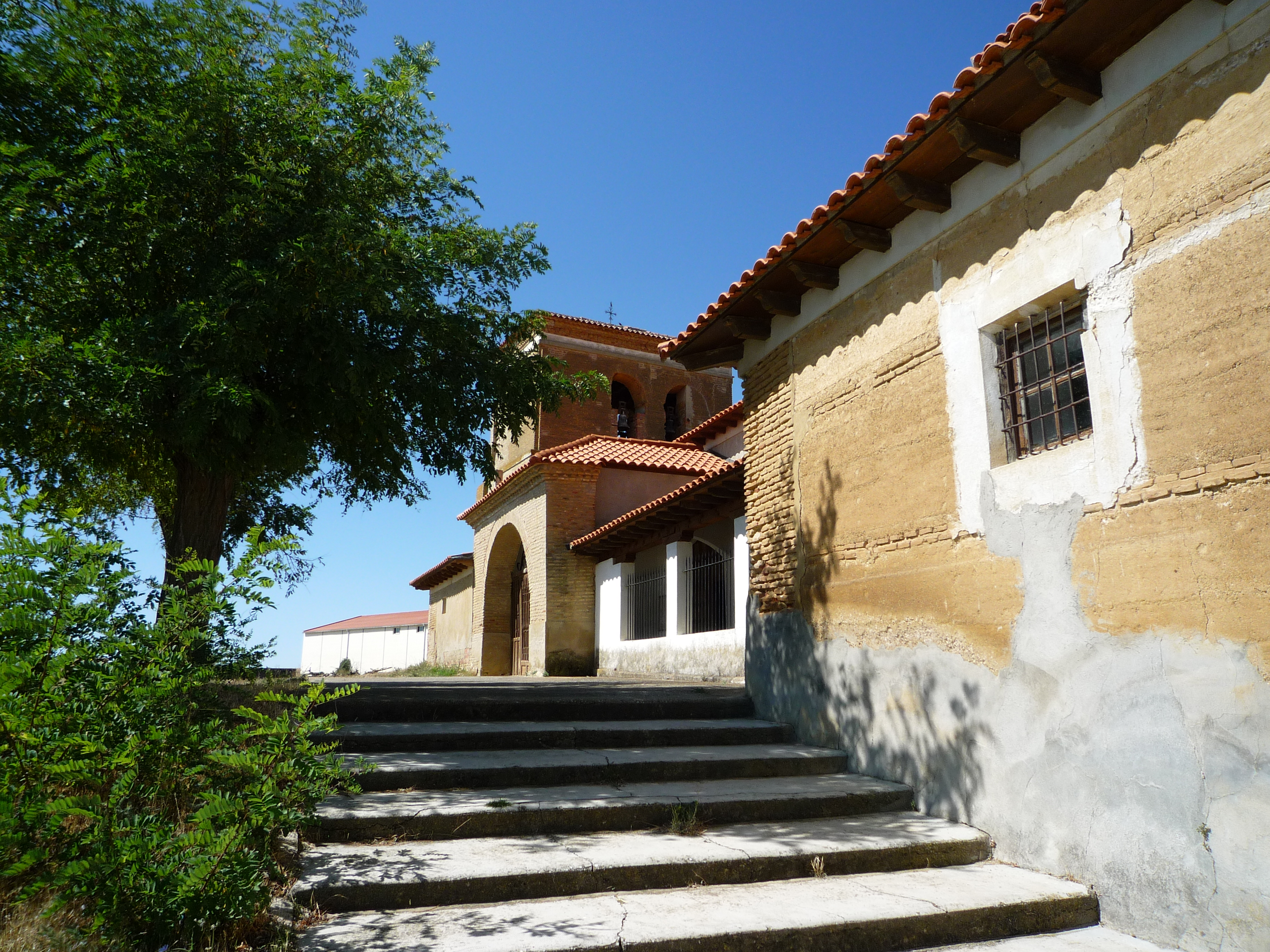
- Interactive map of Villarmentero de Campos
- Country: Spain
- Autonomous community: Castile and León
- Province: Palencia
- Municipality: Villarmentero de Campos

Area
  - Total: 7 km^{2} (2.7 sq mi)

Population (2025-01-01)
  - Total: 26
  - Density: 3.7/km^{2} (9.6/sq mi)
- Time zone: UTC+1 (CET)
  - Summer (DST): UTC+2 (CEST)
- Website: Official website

Villarmentero de Campos is a municipality located in the province of Palencia, Castile and León, Spain. According to the 2022 census (INE), the municipality has a population of 19 inhabitants.
