= Villanueva del Rebollar =

Coordinates: 42°14′N 4°44′W

- municipality
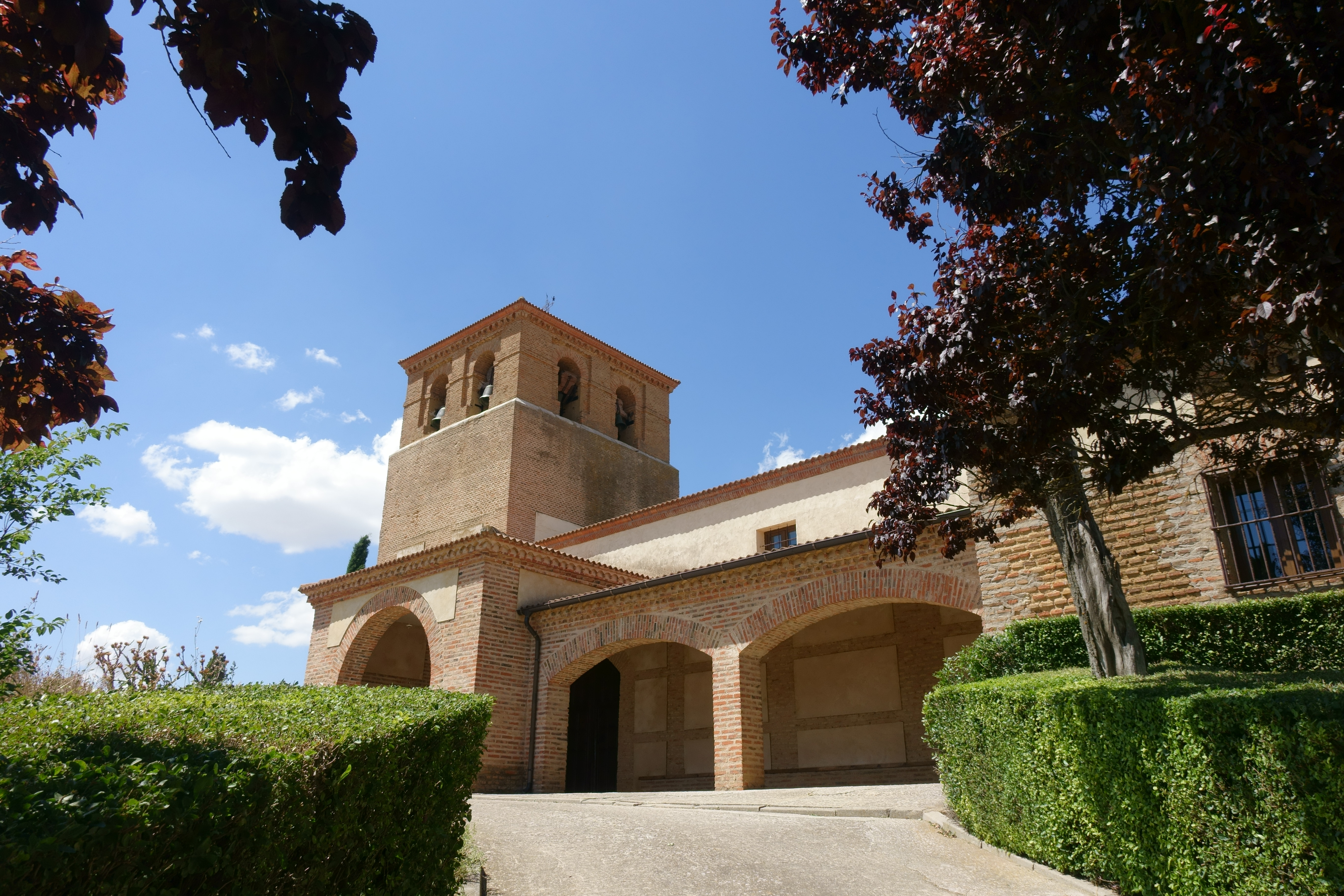
- Interactive map of Villanueva del Rebollar
- Country: Spain
- Autonomous community: Castile and León
- Province: Palencia
- Municipality: Villanueva del Rebollar

Area
  - Total: 16 km^{2} (6.2 sq mi)

Population (2025-01-01)
  - Total: 67
  - Density: 4.2/km^{2} (11/sq mi)
- Time zone: UTC+1 (CET)
  - Summer (DST): UTC+2 (CEST)
- Website: Official website

Villanueva del Rebollar is a municipality located in the province of Palencia, Castile and León, Spain. According to the 2022 census (INE), the municipality has a population of 65 inhabitants.

The town was the lordship of Don Rodrigo Manrique in the 15th century.
