= Villaturde =

Coordinates: 42°23′N 4°40′W

- municipality
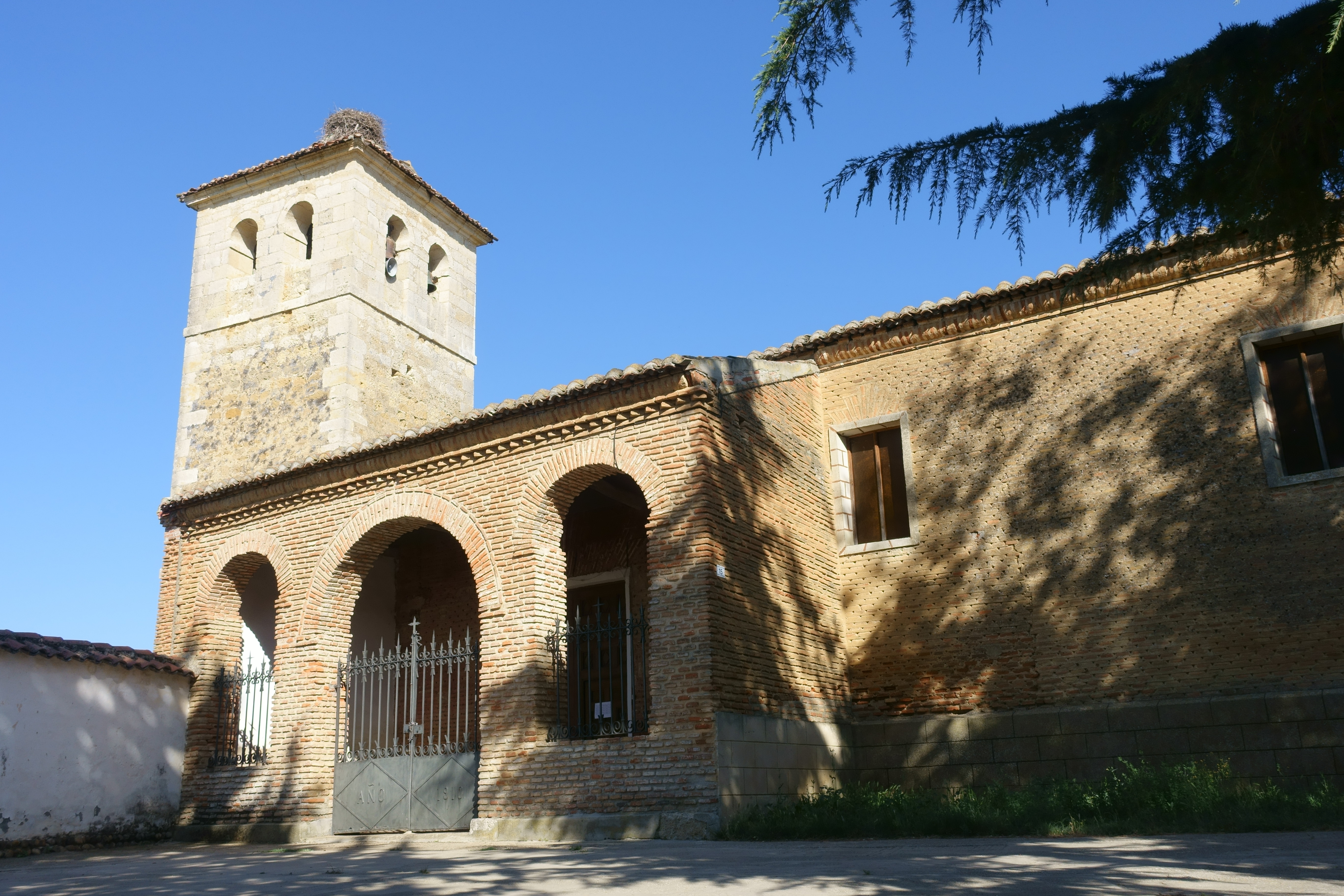

- Flag Coat of arms
- Interactive map of Villaturde
- Country: Spain
- Autonomous community: Castile and León
- Province: Palencia
- Municipality: Villaturde

Area
  - Total: 26 km^{2} (10 sq mi)

Population (2025-01-01)
  - Total: 148
  - Density: 5.7/km^{2} (15/sq mi)
- Time zone: UTC+1 (CET)
  - Summer (DST): UTC+2 (CEST)
- Website: Official website

Villaturde is a municipality located in the province of Palencia, Castile and León, Spain. According to the 2022 census (INE), the municipality has a population of 154 inhabitants.
