= Herrín de Campos =

Coordinates: 42°07′N 4°57′W

Herrín de Campos, Spain
- Coat of arms

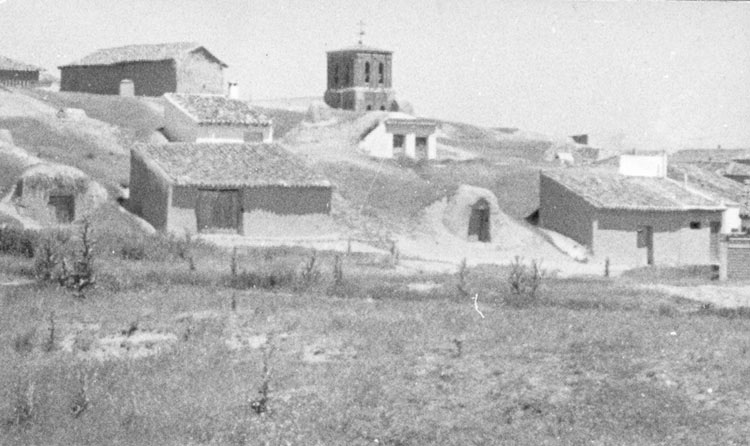
- old view
- Country: Spain
- Autonomous community: Castile and León
- Province: Valladolid
- Municipality: Herrín de Campos

Area
  - Total: 29 km^{2} (11 sq mi)
- Elevation: 784 m (2,572 ft)

Population (2025-01-01)
  - Total: 111
  - Density: 3.8/km^{2} (9.9/sq mi)
- Time zone: UTC+1 (CET)
  - Summer (DST): UTC+2 (CEST)

Herrín de Campos is a municipality located in the province of Valladolid, Castile and León, Spain. According to the 2004 census (INE), the municipality has a population of 191 inhabitants.
