= Villovieco =

Coordinates: 42°18′N 4°29′W

- municipality
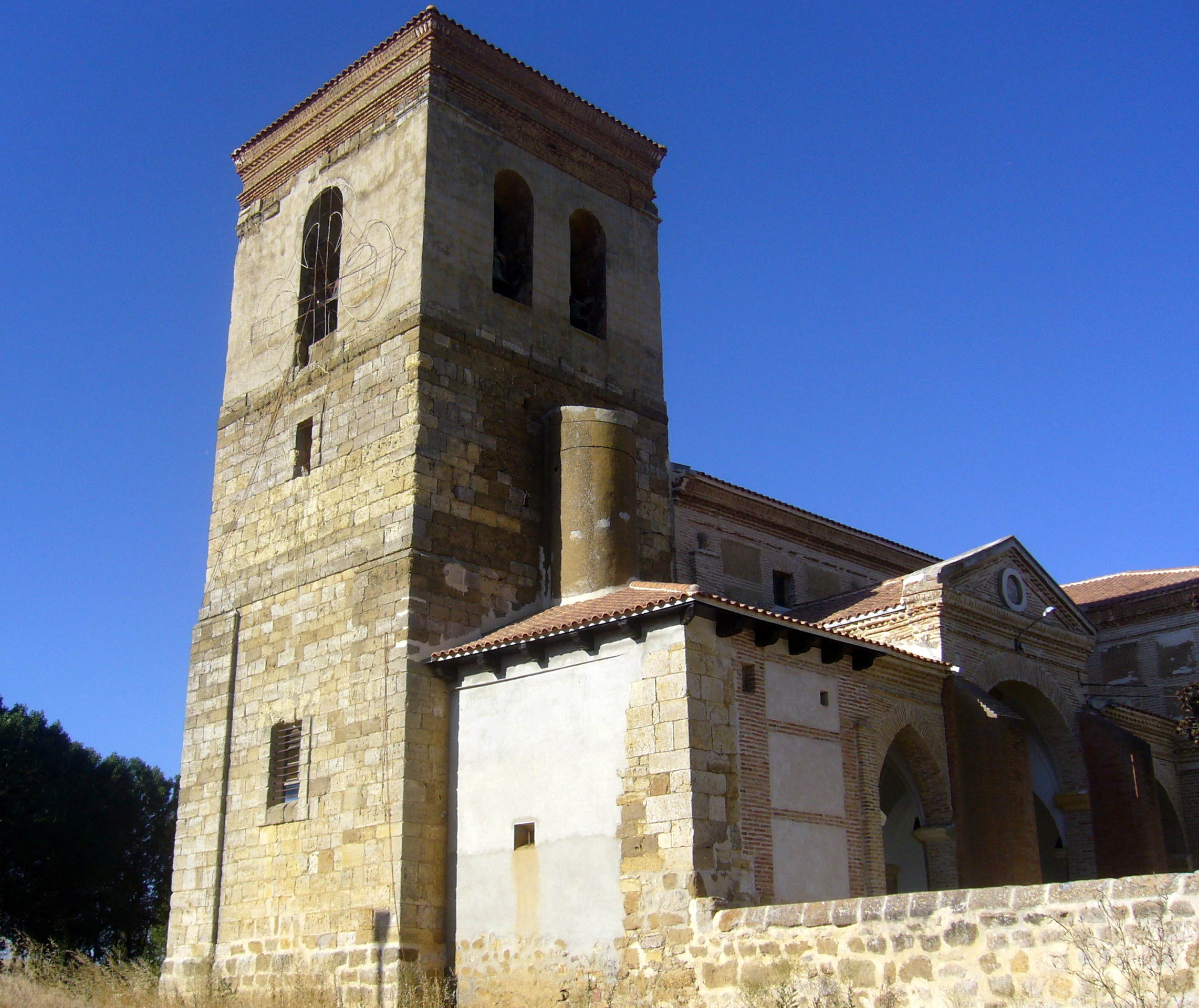
- Interactive map of Villovieco
- Country: Spain
- Autonomous community: Castile and León
- Province: Palencia
- Municipality: Villovieco

Area
  - Total: 23.53 km^{2} (9.08 sq mi)
- Elevation: 789 m (2,589 ft)

Population (2025-01-01)
  - Total: 62
  - Density: 2.6/km^{2} (6.8/sq mi)
- Time zone: UTC+1 (CET)
  - Summer (DST): UTC+2 (CEST)
- Website: Official website

Villovieco is a municipality located in the province of Palencia, Castile and León, Spain. According to the 2022 census (INE), the municipality had a population of 68 inhabitants.
