= Autillo de Campos =

Coordinates: 42°05′N 4°50′W

- municipality
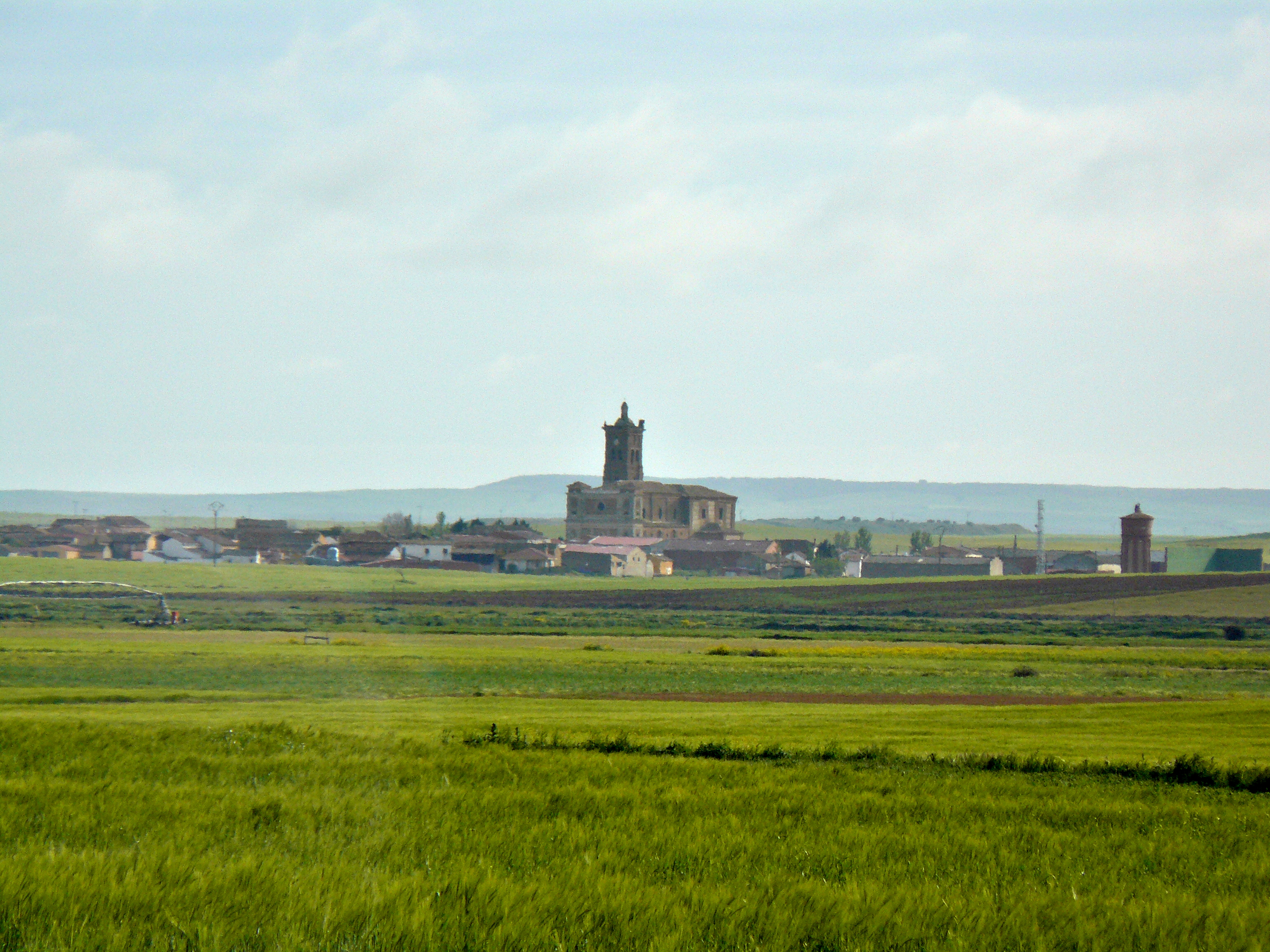

- Coat of arms
- Interactive map of Autillo de Campos
- Country: Spain
- Autonomous community: Castile and León
- Province: Palencia

Area
  - Total: 30 km^{2} (12 sq mi)

Population (2025-01-01)
  - Total: 125
  - Density: 4.2/km^{2} (11/sq mi)
- Time zone: UTC+1 (CET)
  - Summer (DST): UTC+2 (CEST)
- Website: http://autillodecampos.es

Autillo de Campos is a municipality located in the province of Palencia, Castile and León, Spain. According to the 2004 census (INE), the municipality has a population of 191 inhabitants.
