= Quintanilla de Onsoña =

- municipality
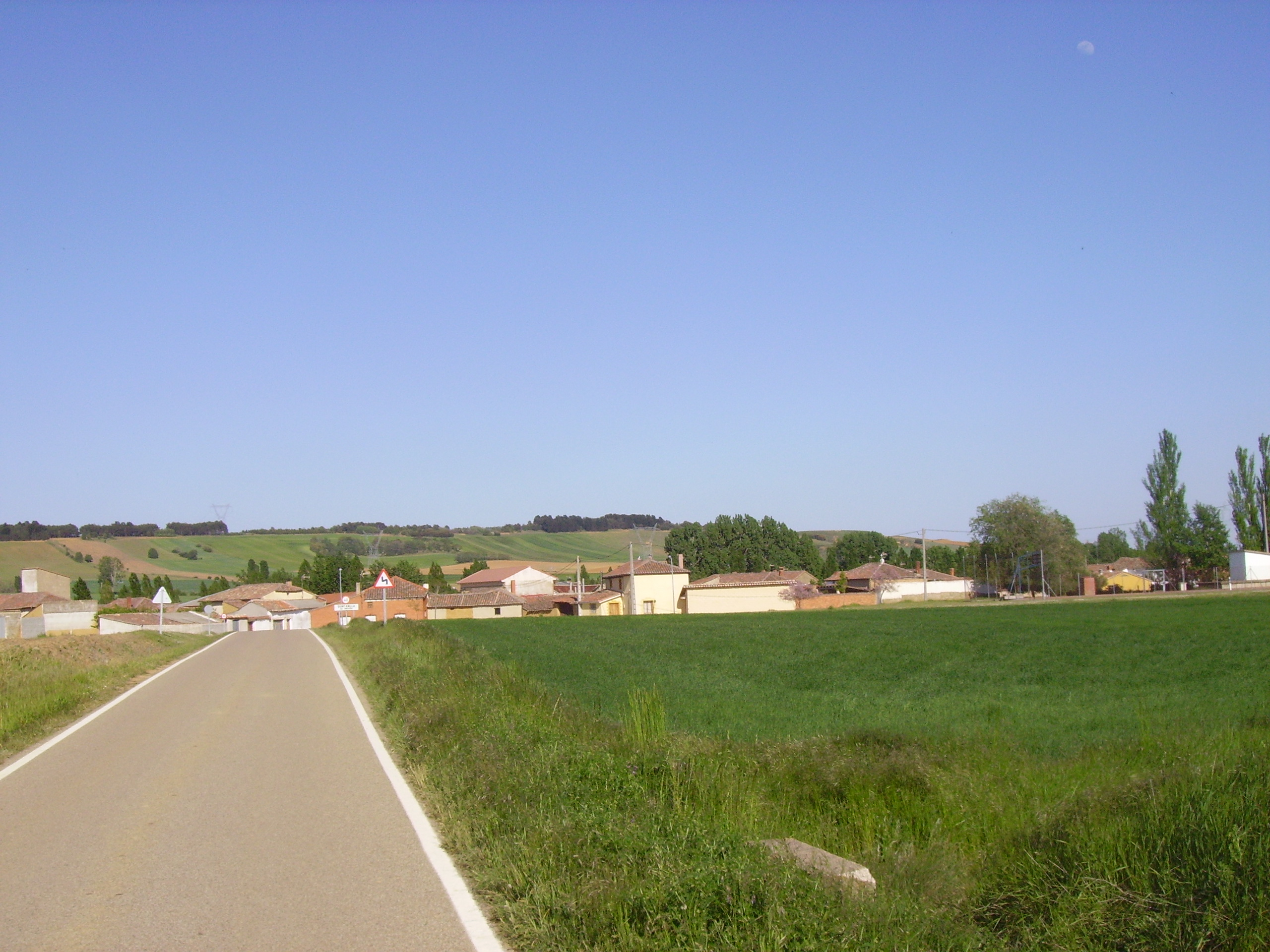

- Location of Quintanilla de Onsoña in Spain
- Coordinates: 42°28′08″N 4°39′51″W
- Country: Spain
- Autonomous community: Castile and León
- Province: Palencia
- Established: 1000 AC

Government
  - Mayor: María Teresa Carmona Crespo (PP)

Area
  - Total: 51.06 km^{2} (19.71 sq mi)
- Elevation: 888 m (2,913 ft)

Population (2025-01-01)
  - Total: 167
  - Density: 3.27/km^{2} (8.47/sq mi)
- Demonym: Quintanillense
- Postal code: 34114
- Website: Official website

Quintanilla de Onsoña is a municipality in the province of Palencia, in the autonomous community of Castile-Leon, Spain.

The village is located on the banks of the Carrión River. The municipal, Quintanilla, is located at 888 m altitude, 58 km far from the city of Palencia and in 2011 had 55 inhabitants (208 in the entire municipality) over an area of 52 km ².

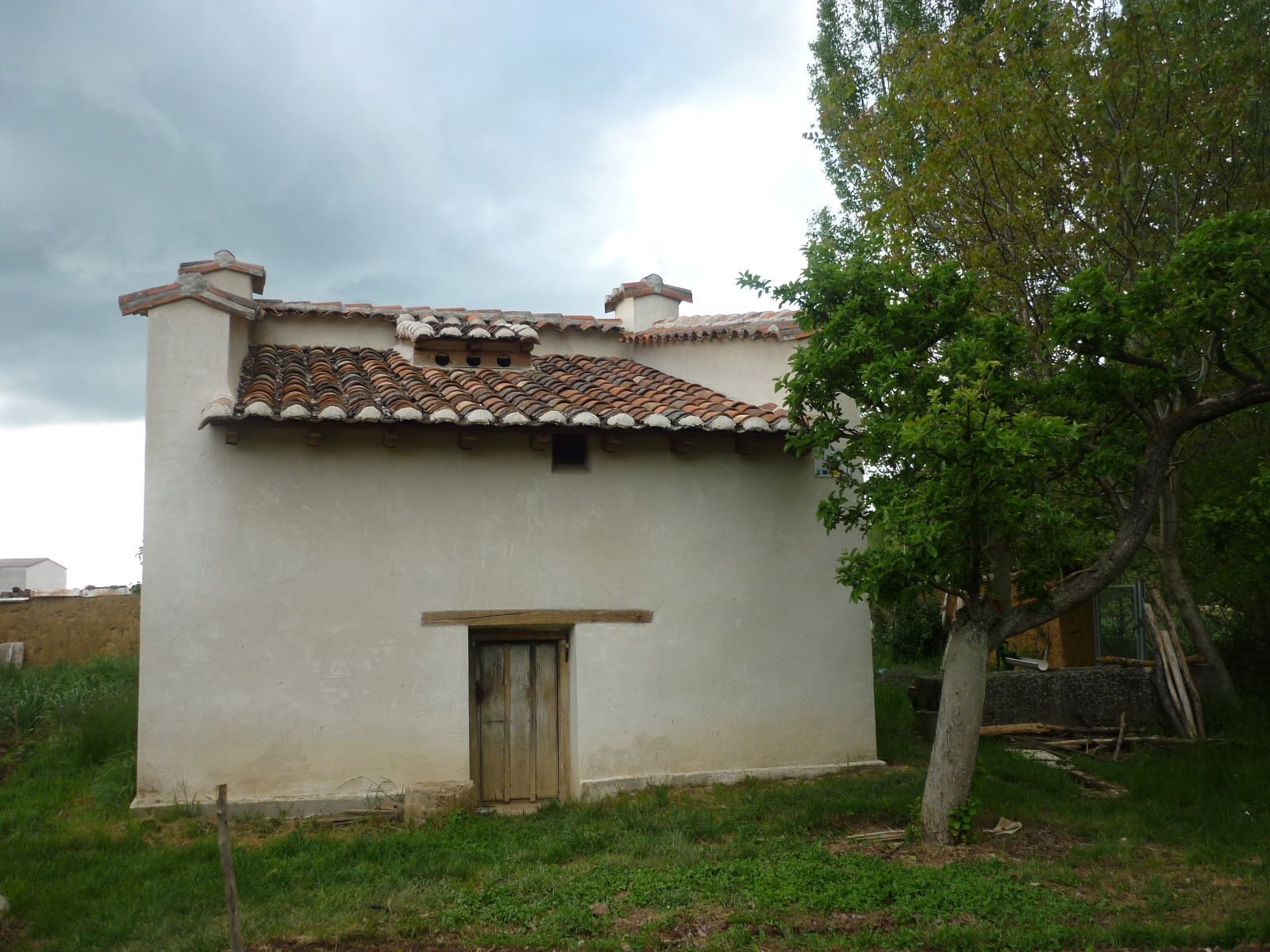

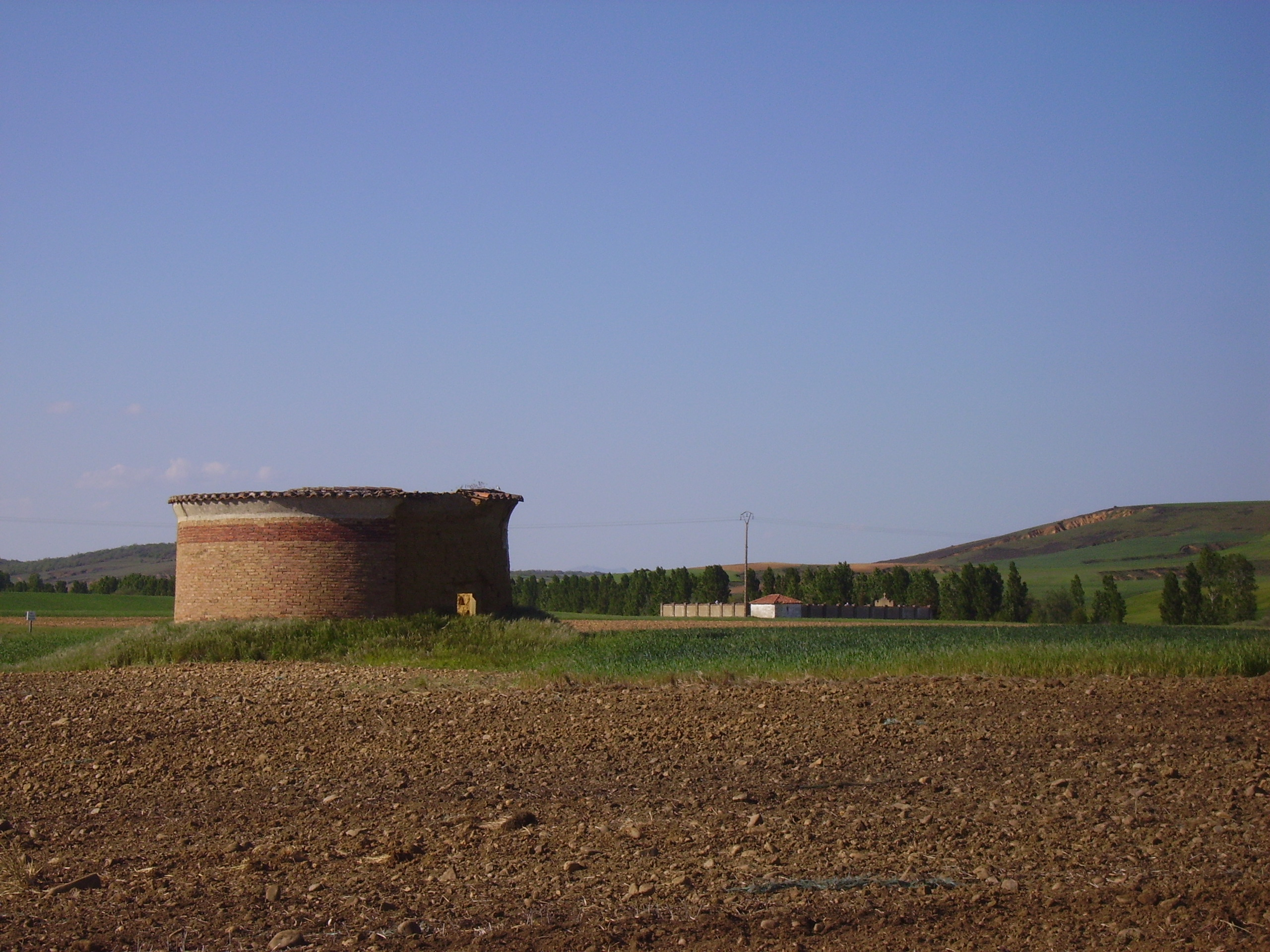

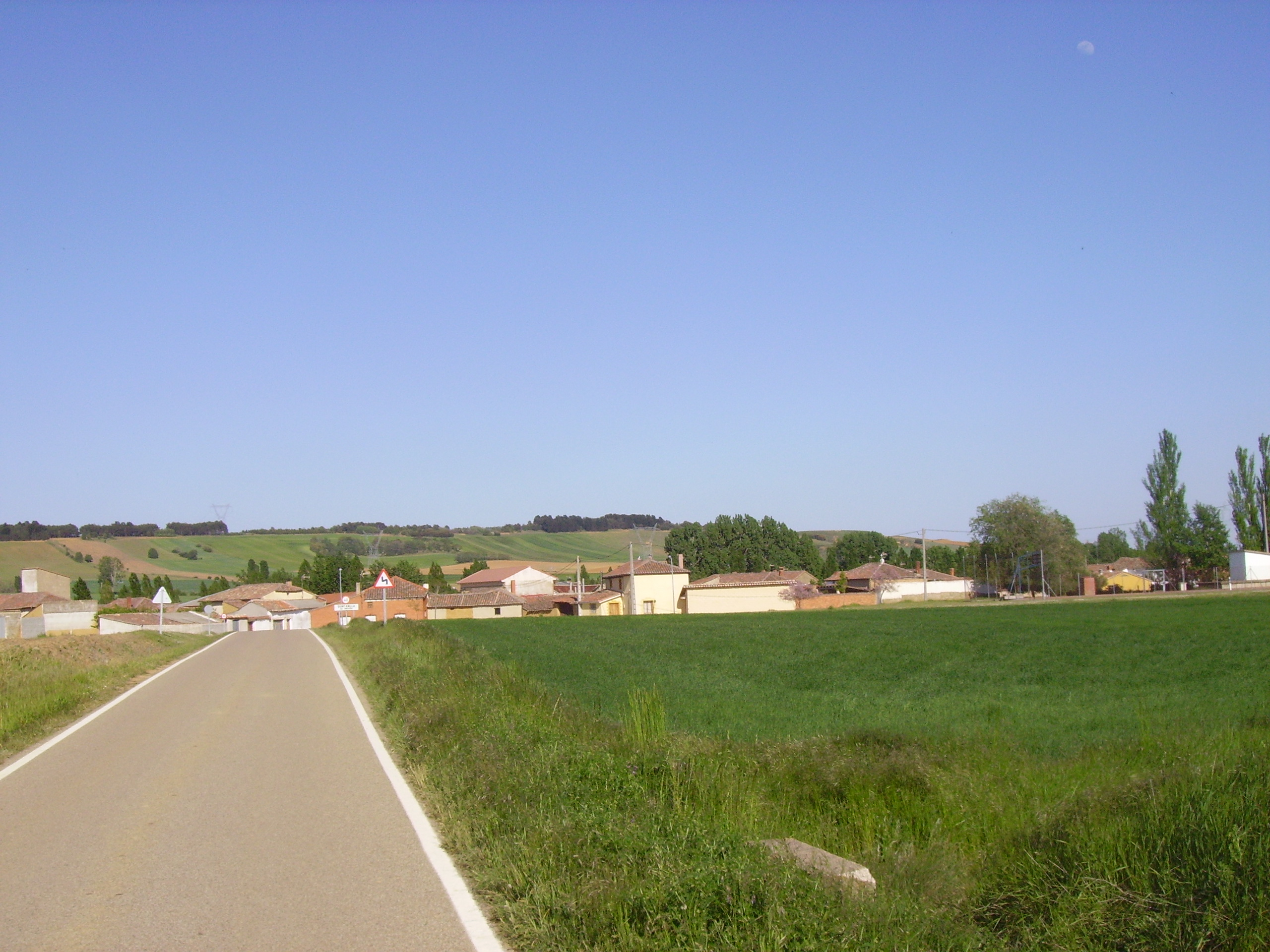

== Economy ==
Agriculture, tourism and industry.
