= Cardeñosa de Volpejera =

Coordinates: 42°14′N 4°42′W

- municipality
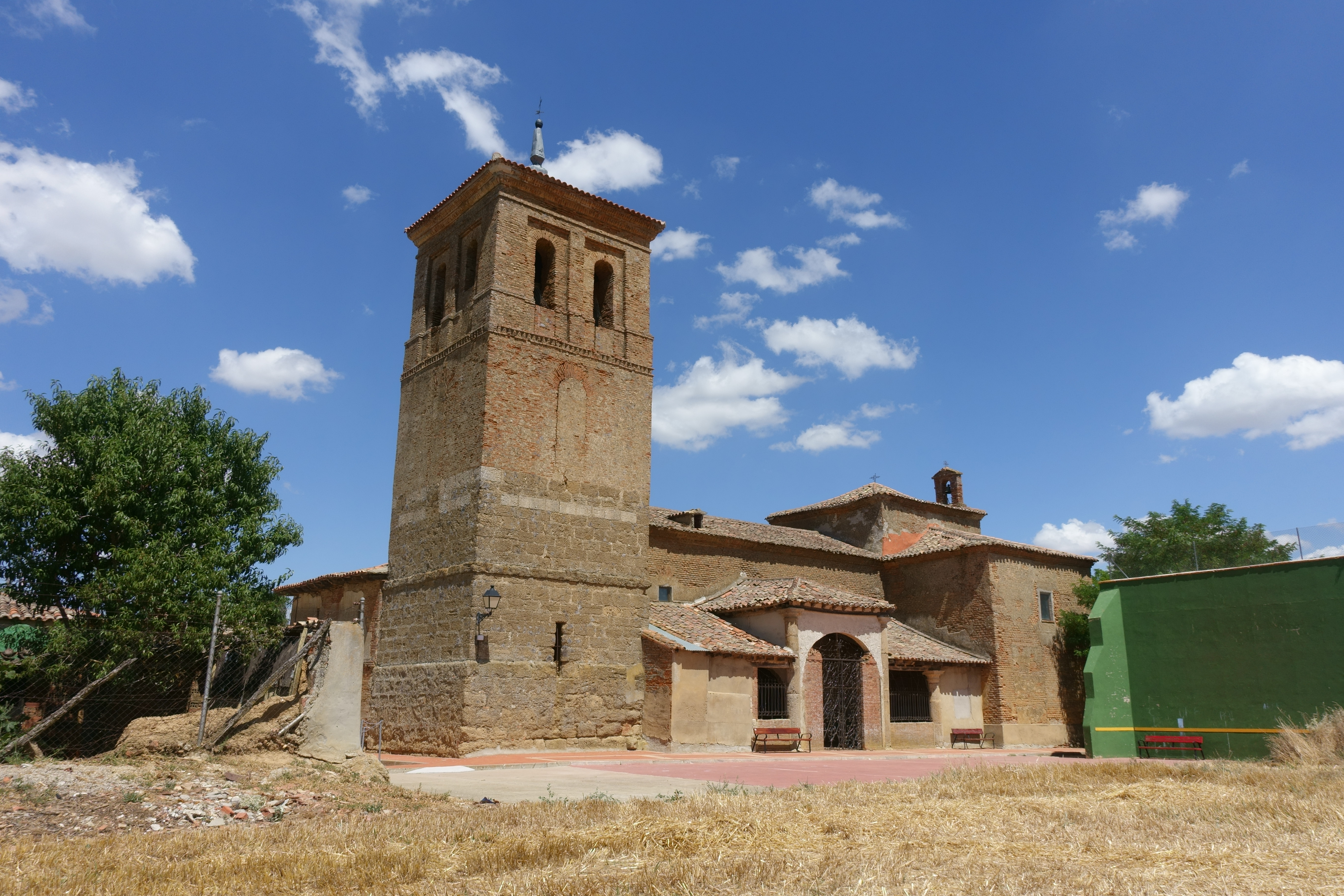

- Flag Coat of arms
- Interactive map of Cardeñosa de Volpejera
- Country: Spain
- Autonomous community: Castile and León
- Province: Palencia
- Municipality: Cardeñosa de Volpejera

Area
  - Total: 13.70 km^{2} (5.29 sq mi)
- Elevation: 821 m (2,694 ft)

Population (2025-01-01)
  - Total: 64
  - Density: 4.7/km^{2} (12/sq mi)
- Time zone: UTC+1 (CET)
  - Summer (DST): UTC+2 (CEST)
- Website: Official website

Cardeñosa de Volpejera is a municipality located in the province of Palencia, Castile and León, Spain. According to the 2004 census (INE), the municipality had a population of 51 inhabitants.
