= Monzón de Campos =

Coordinates: 42°07′N 4°30′W

- municipality
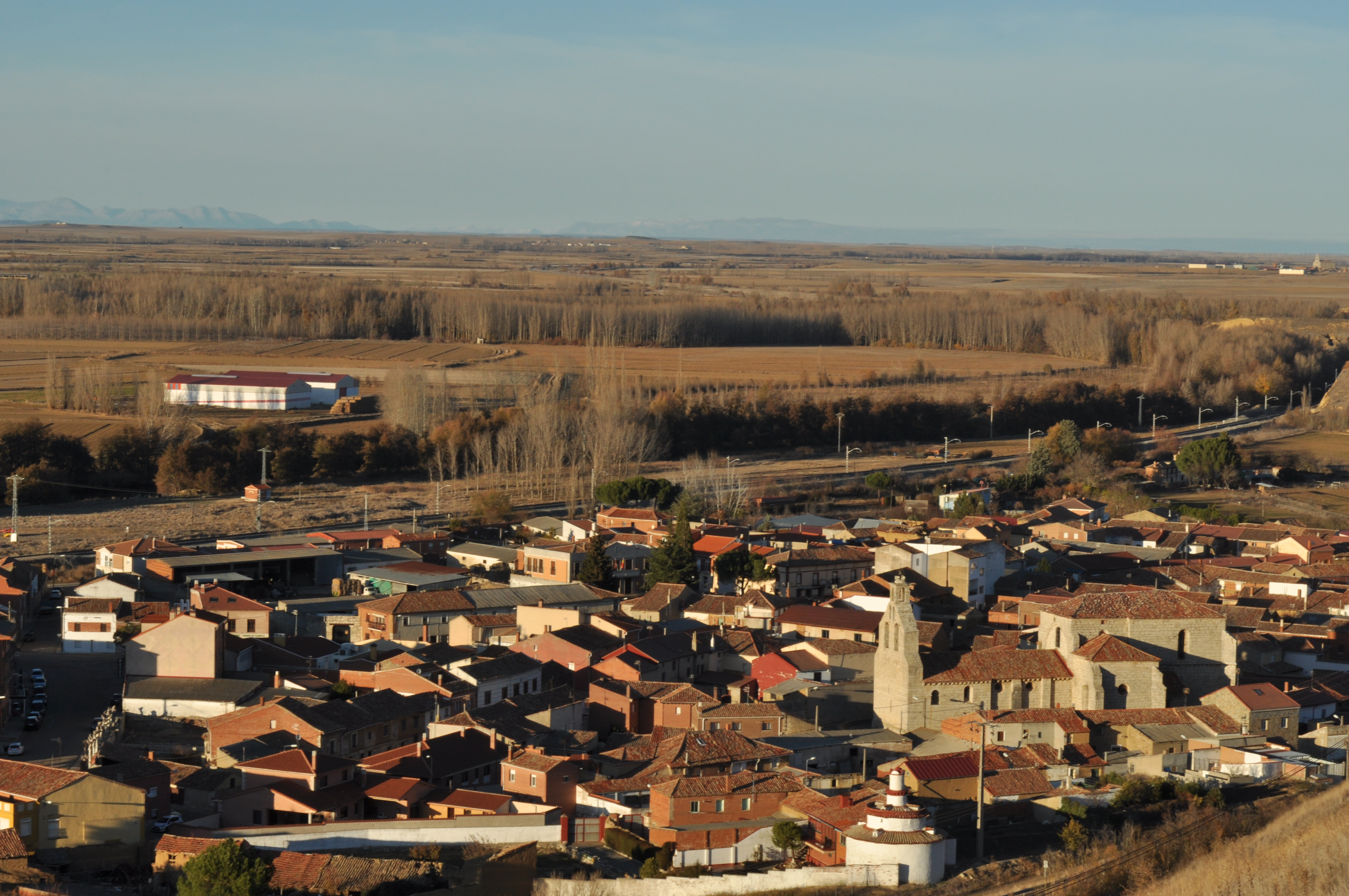

- Coat of arms
- Interactive map of Monzón de Campos
- Country: Spain
- Autonomous community: Castile and León
- Province: Palencia
- Municipality: Monzón de Campos

Area
  - Total: 45 km^{2} (17 sq mi)

Population (2025-01-01)
  - Total: 608
  - Density: 14/km^{2} (35/sq mi)
- Time zone: UTC+1 (CET)
  - Summer (DST): UTC+2 (CEST)
- Website: Official website

Monzón de Campos is a municipality located in the province of Palencia, Castile and León, Spain.

According to the 2004 census (INE), the municipality had a population of 696 inhabitants.
