= Revenga de Campos =

Coordinates: 42°17′N 4°29′W

- municipality
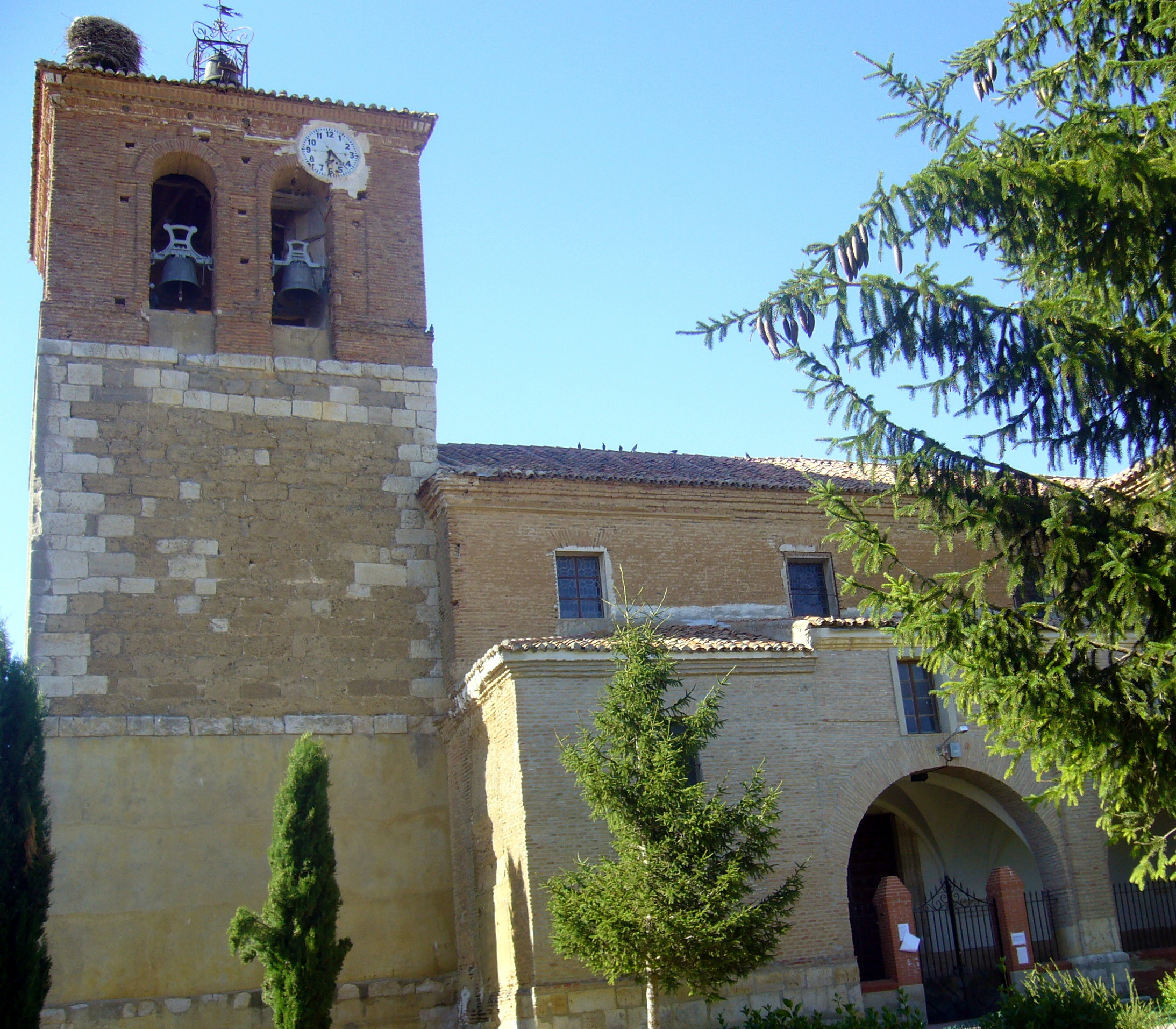

- Flag Coat of arms
- Interactive map of Revenga de Campos
- Country: Spain
- Autonomous community: Castile and León
- Province: Palencia

Area
  - Total: 22 km^{2} (8.5 sq mi)

Population (2025-01-01)
  - Total: 127
  - Density: 5.8/km^{2} (15/sq mi)
- Time zone: UTC+1 (CET)
  - Summer (DST): UTC+2 (CEST)
- Website: Official website

Revenga de Campos is a municipality located in the province of Palencia, Castile and León, Spain. According to the 2004 census (INE), the municipality has a population of 179 inhabitants.
