= Sotobañado y Priorato =

Coordinates: 42°35′N 4°26′W

- municipality
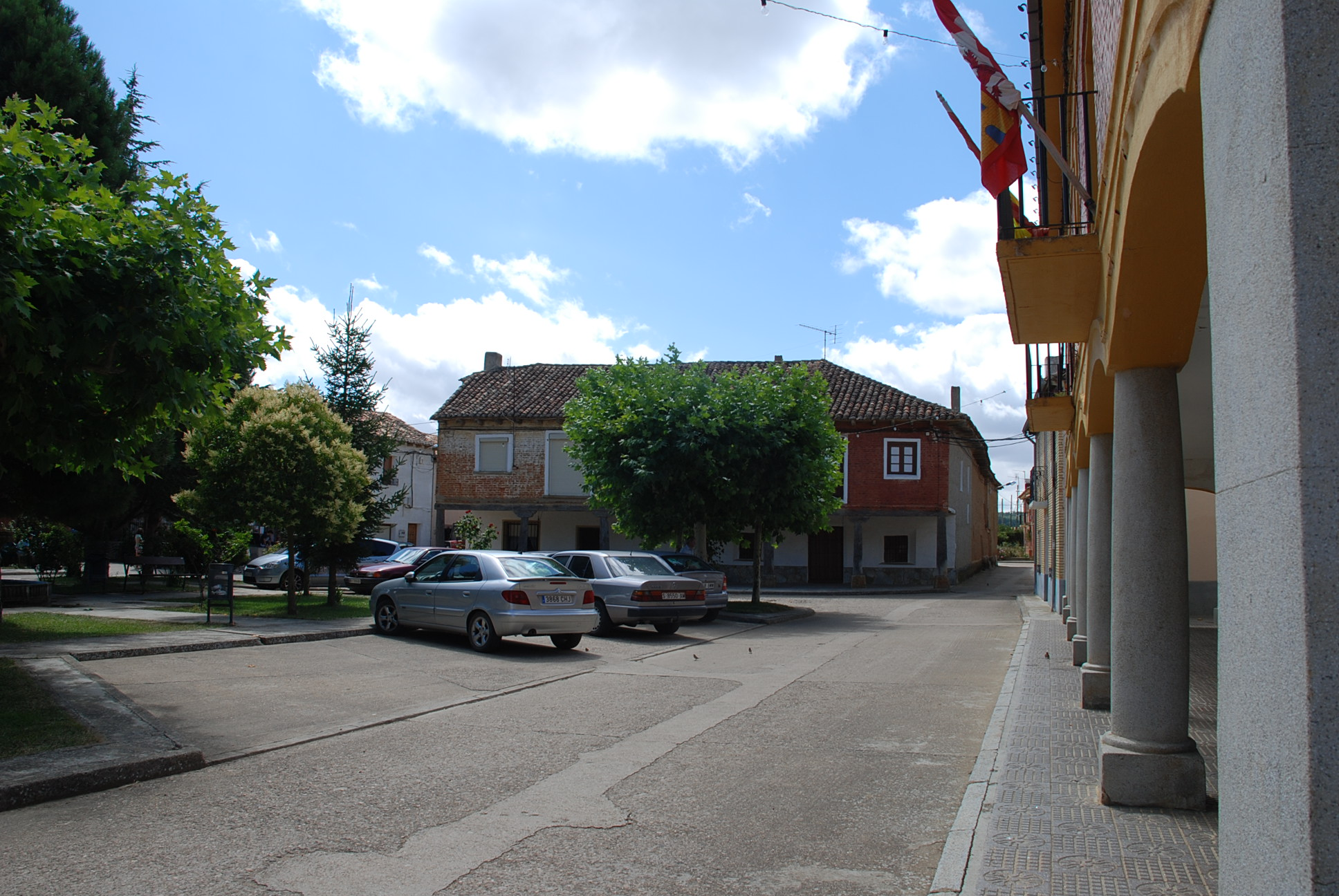

- Flag Coat of arms
- Interactive map of Sotobañado y Priorato
- Country: Spain
- Autonomous community: Castile and León
- Province: Palencia
- Municipality: Sotobañado y Priorato

Area
  - Total: 25.26 km^{2} (9.75 sq mi)
- Elevation: 890 m (2,920 ft)

Population (2025-01-01)
  - Total: 154
  - Density: 6.10/km^{2} (15.8/sq mi)
- Time zone: UTC+1 (CET)
  - Summer (DST): UTC+2 (CEST)
- Website: Official website

Sotobañado y Priorato is a municipality located in the province of Palencia, Castile and León, Spain. According to the 2025 census (INE), the municipality had a population of 154 inhabitants.
