= Picón Bejes-Tresviso =

Spanish blue cheese

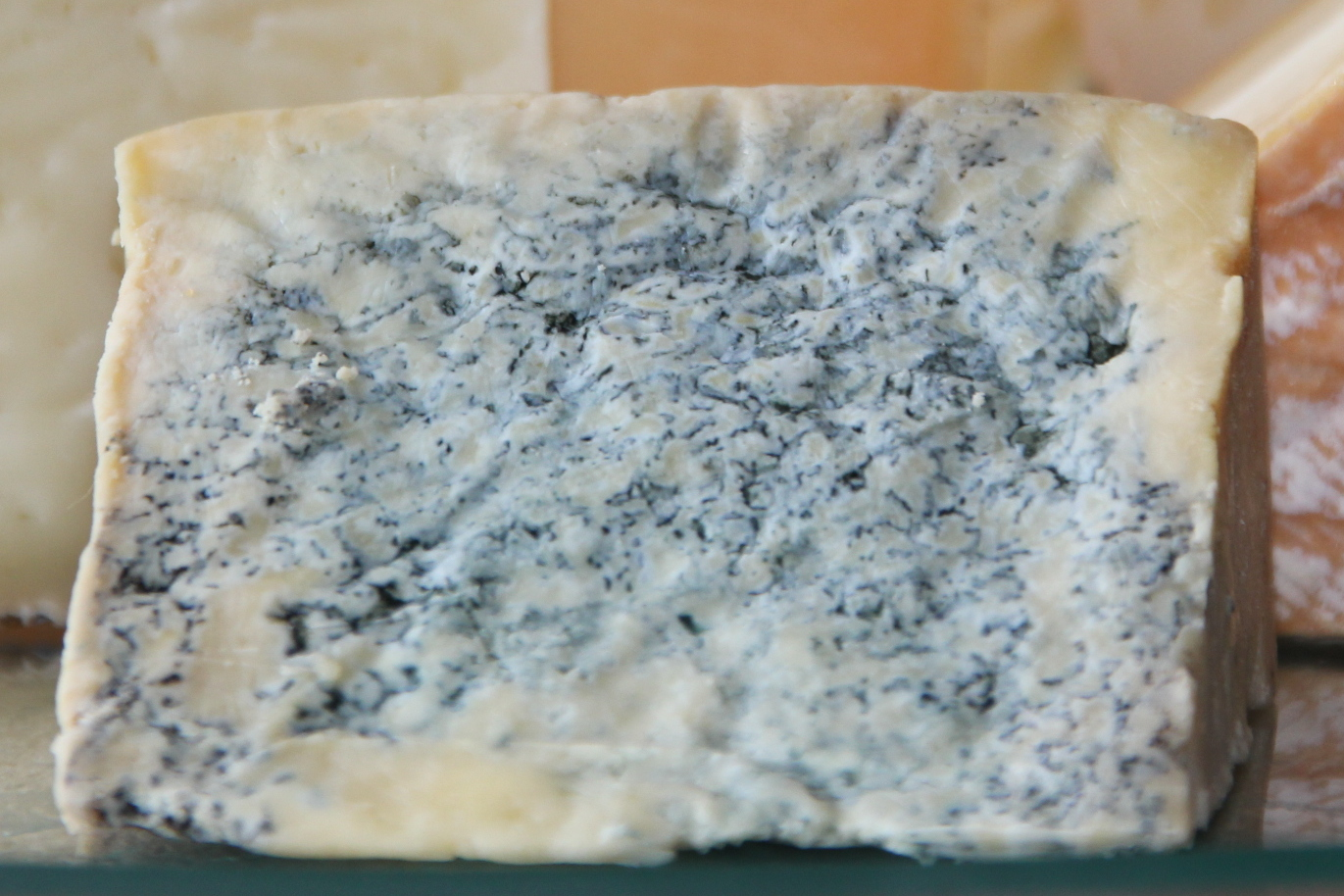
- Country of origin: Spain
- Region: Cantabria
- Source of milk: a mixture of sheep's, cow's and goat's milk
- Texture: Hard Semi-hard Soft
- Dimensions: 7-15 cm x 15-20cm
- Weight: 0.7-2.8kg

Picón Bejes-Tresviso is a blue cheese from Cantabria, in the north of Spain. It has been protected under Denominación de Origen (DO) legislation since 1994, prior to which it was traditionally known as Picón de Tresviso and Queso Picón de Bejes. The designated area centers in the Liébana valley and production is restricted to the municipalities of Potes, Pesaguero, Cabezón de Liébana, Camaleño, Cillorigo de Liébana, Peñarrubia, Tresviso and Vega de Liébana.

== Production ==
A mixture of cow's, sheep's and goat's milk is used in its production (although not necessarily from Bejes or Tresviso). The curd is created using a precise dose of rennet and cut into hazelnut-sized pieces, which are then drained and allowed to dry. The curd pieces are placed loosely in the mould, allowing sufficient air to circulate and initiate the growth of penicillium spores. The cheese is then salted and left for an initial drying and curing period of between 12 and 18 days, at a temperature between 15 and 18 °C (59 and 64 °F).

Although much of the process thus far may take place in modern industrial units, DO regulations stipulate that final maturity be achieved by further curing in a natural limestone cave, typical of the geology of the Liébana region, for a minimum of two months. Maturation in this cool, high-humidity environment develops the particular taste and brevibacterium-infested crust typical of many blue cheeses.

== Characteristics ==
The finished cylindrical cheese may be between 7 and 15 cm (2.8 and 5.9 in) high and have a diameter of 15 to 20 cm (5.9 to 7.9 in), weighing anything between 700 g (1.5 lb) and 2.8 kg (6.2 lb). The rind is thin and grey to yellow-green in colour. The flesh is smooth, white, and compact, with streaks and patches of teal-coloured veins and a powerful, slightly spicy flavour. Acidity values in the fat content of the cheese have been shown to increase by a factor of twenty over the uncured curd.

== Marketing ==
Prior to DO regulation, it was often sold wrapped in Sycamore Maple (Acer pseudoplatanus) leaves and is still marketed this way locally, albeit without the DO certification label. It is more widely available wrapped in a gold aluminum foil that permits stamping with an authentication seal and serial number. As result, leaf-bound Picón Bejes-Tresviso cheese is rarely found outside of the Liébana region.

== See also ==
- Cabrales cheese
- List of cheeses
