= Flora of Cantabria =

Plant species of Cantabria

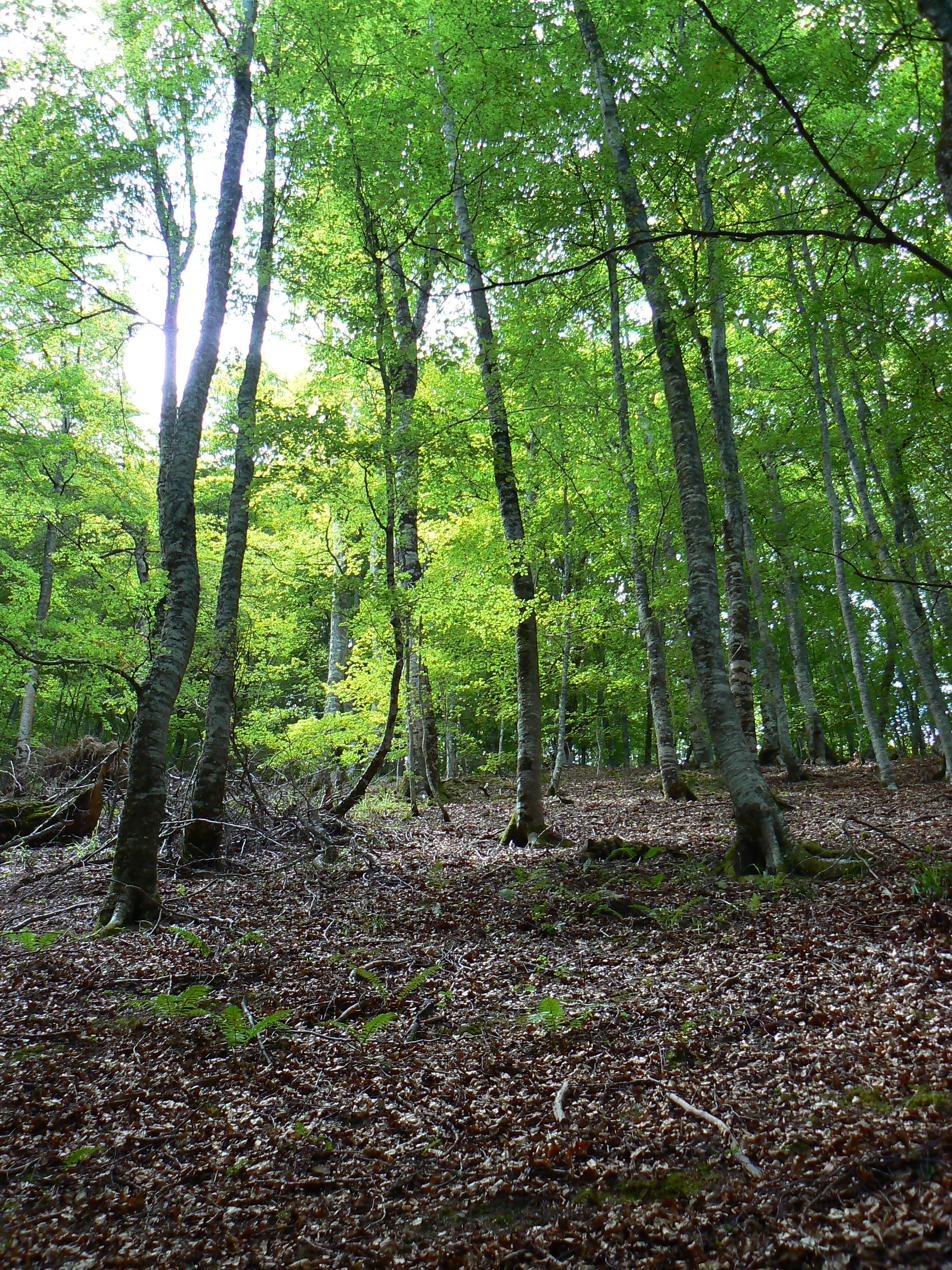
Beech forest in the foothills of the Piedrasluengas pass, in Liébana.

The flora of Cantabria is the result of three determining factors: the climate, the composition of the soil, directly dependent on the types of existing rocks, and the evolutionary history of the different plant formations.

From the point of view of its flora, Cantabria is located between two biogeographic realms. Most of the territory belongs to the Eurosiberian region, but the southern end is part of the Mediterranean region. This border situation has a direct effect on the characteristics of the plant landscape of the region, where Mediterranean and Atlantic species intermingle, enriching the botanical composition of the different existing ecosystems.

== Origin of current vegetation ==
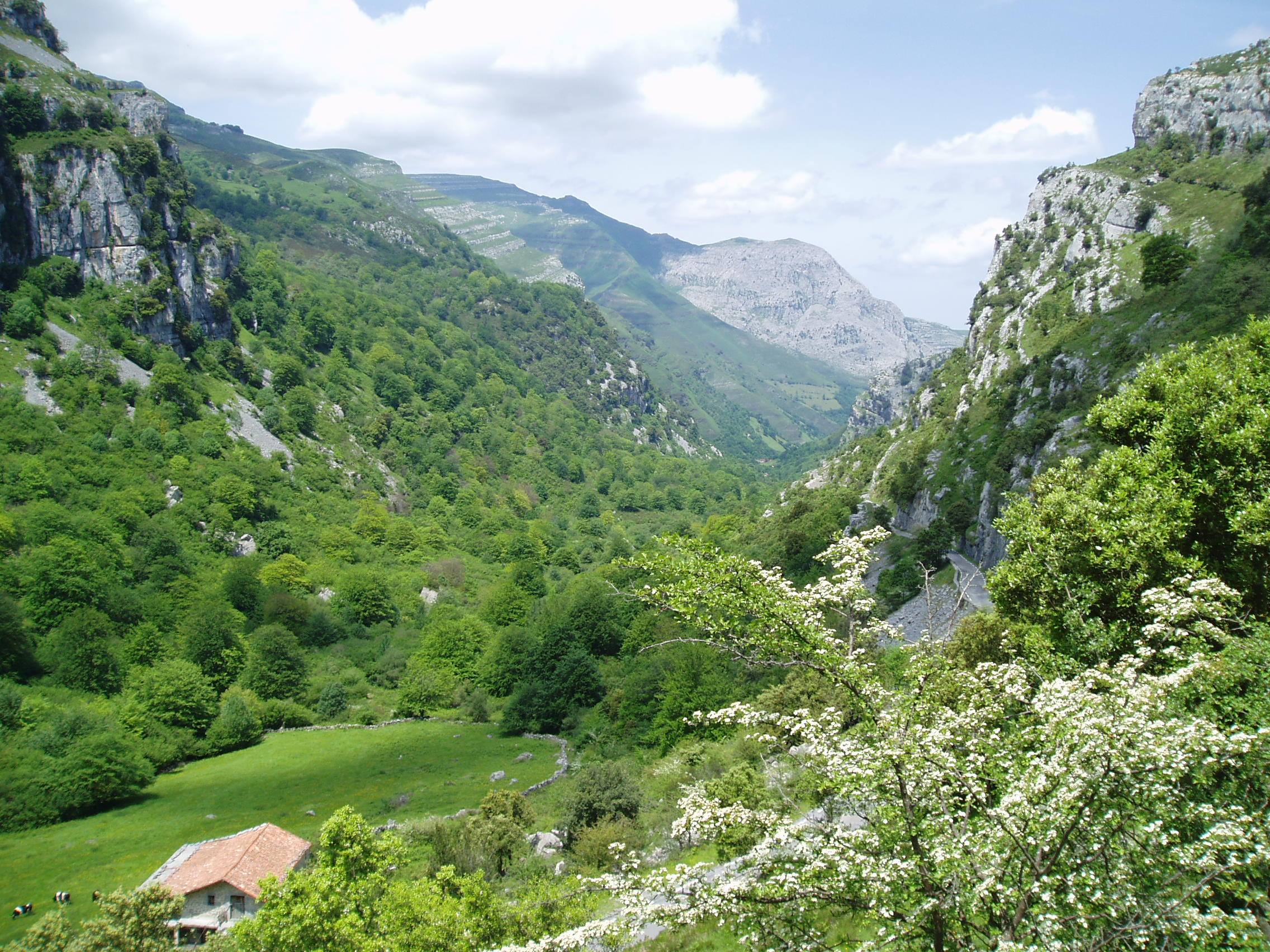
Collados del Asón Natural Park.

The vegetation of Cantabria is adapted to two types of substrate. On the one hand, there are limestone rocks, as in Peña Cabarga or Picos de Europa, with little soil development and a large amount of outcropping rocks, which have a very characteristic flora adapted to these types of soils, called calcareous flora. These are very similar throughout the region and are especially abundant in the eastern sector, where this type of substrate predominates. On the other hand, there are acidic rocks (such as sandstones, clays or siltstones), which supply few nutrients to the soil. This type of material harbors an acidophilic flora very characteristic of the high mountains of the Cantabrian Mountains which is, in general, dominant in the region.

The other determining factor of the composition of the current vegetation landscape is the evolutionary history of the different floristic communities present today. This evolution is due both to biogeographical causes and to the influence exerted by man over the centuries. The Quaternary glaciations, together with the interglacial periods, marked the evolution of the different phases of the flora of the region, which went through very cold periods, with tundra-type vegetation, and warmer periods, in which temperate deciduous hardwood forests spread throughout the territory. Three thousand years ago is generally considered to be the approximate date when the vegetation acquired similar characteristics to the present, that is, dominated by deciduous hardwood forests, accompanied by Mediterranean forest formations, with evergreen species and covering the territory from sea level to 1700 - 1900 meters, considered the ceiling of the wooded vegetation in Cantabria. Of this potential vegetation, only a small unaltered part survives today in the most inaccessible parts of the region. In the rest of the territory, human action has caused the degeneration of the forest, and the appearance of substitution stages, made up of heaths and scrublands, and pastures and meadows, the basis for livestock feeding.

The vegetation landscape can also be defined by its bioclimatic floors, which are distributed in a staggered manner with respect to altitude. Four bioclimatic floors or horizons can be differentiated in Cantabria: the colline, the montane, the subalpine and the alpine, the latter restricted to the summits of the Picos de Europa.

== Colline zone ==
The colline level, which is distributed from approximately sea level to 500 – 600 meters above sea level, has a vegetation landscape dominated by the presence of mowing meadows, the basis of dairy cattle feeding, which have been implanted by man, replacing the old temperate deciduous forests that covered the entire territory. This area has been the most transformed by human development, as it is here that the majority of the population and a large part of the infrastructure and intensive exploitation is located, so its ecosystems show a significant degree of alteration.

The vegetation communities of these coastal territories include those typical of the littoral (beaches and dunes, cliffs, and marshes), hay meadows, mixed deciduous forests, holm oak groves, riverside forests and eucalyptus plantations.

=== Dunes ===
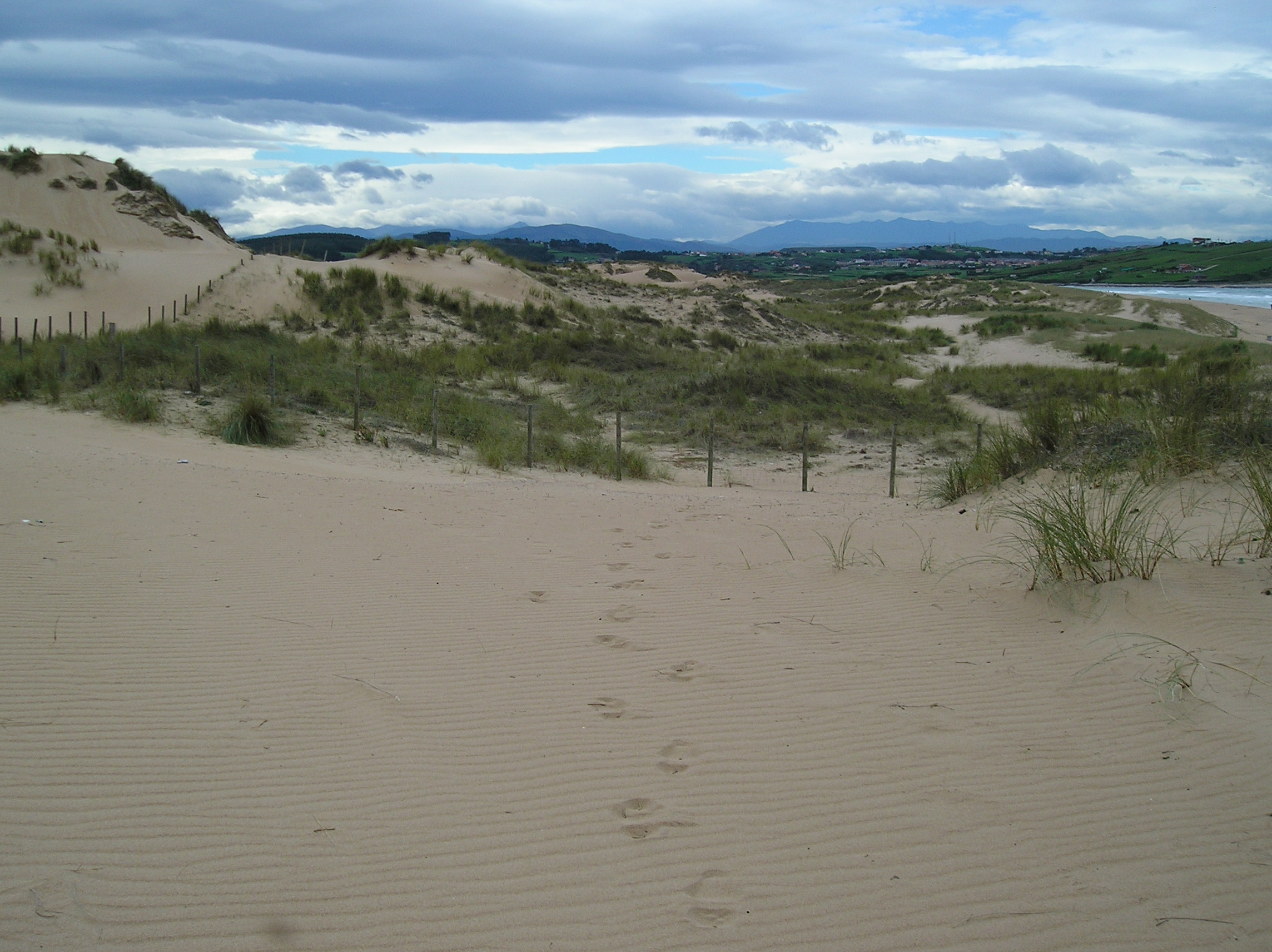
Liencres Dunes.

Coastal dunes are one of the most endangered ecosystems in Cantabria. Its species, all herbaceous, are exclusive to these ecosystems, so their disappearance would mean the irreversible loss of highly specialized plants.

In the area closest to the sea, where the grains of sand deposited by the tide are intercepted, slightly above the average high tide, the first band of pioneer dune vegetation begins to settle, represented in Cantabria mainly by northern couch grass (Elymus farctus), generally accompanied by prickly saltwort (Salsola kali), searockets (Cakile maritima) and arenaria (Honkenya pelopides).

Where there is no marine influence, the sand dunes rise and form strands in the inner part of the large beaches of Cantabria. A certain stabilization of the dune occurs in this growth zone, as a result of the settlement of vegetation that reduces its mobility, especially beachgrass (Ammophila arenaria) which, due to its wingspan and intricate root system, is the main fixative plant in this environment. Other characteristic species of this area are sea holly (Eryngium maritimun), carex (Carex arenaria) or sea spurge (Euphorbia paralias).

Further inland, in the more sheltered areas of the beach, the sandy substrate is fixed in extensive plains covered by less specialized vegetation, in which sandy species are mixed with other opportunistic ones. Meadows of Festuca rubra, Lolium perenne, Lagurus ovatus, Phlenum arenarium and Briza maxima are typical. There are also other species such as Medicago marina and M. littoralis, Linaria maritima, Dianthus monspessulanus and Otanthus maritimus.

Cantabria is home to the largest dune field in the Cantabrian Sea, the Liencres Dunes, declared a natural park by Decree 101/1986 of December 9, 1986. The main natural element that determined the creation of the Park is the dune system located on the right bank of the mouth of the Pas river. The park is a true ecological jewel, due to the enormous development of its dunes and its acceptable degree of conservation, which is threatened by the urban development projects currently existing in its surroundings, which far exceed the carrying capacity of this valuable ecosystem. It was also included in the National Inventory of Points of Geological Interest of the Geological and Mining Institute of Spain (IGME).

=== Coastal flora ===
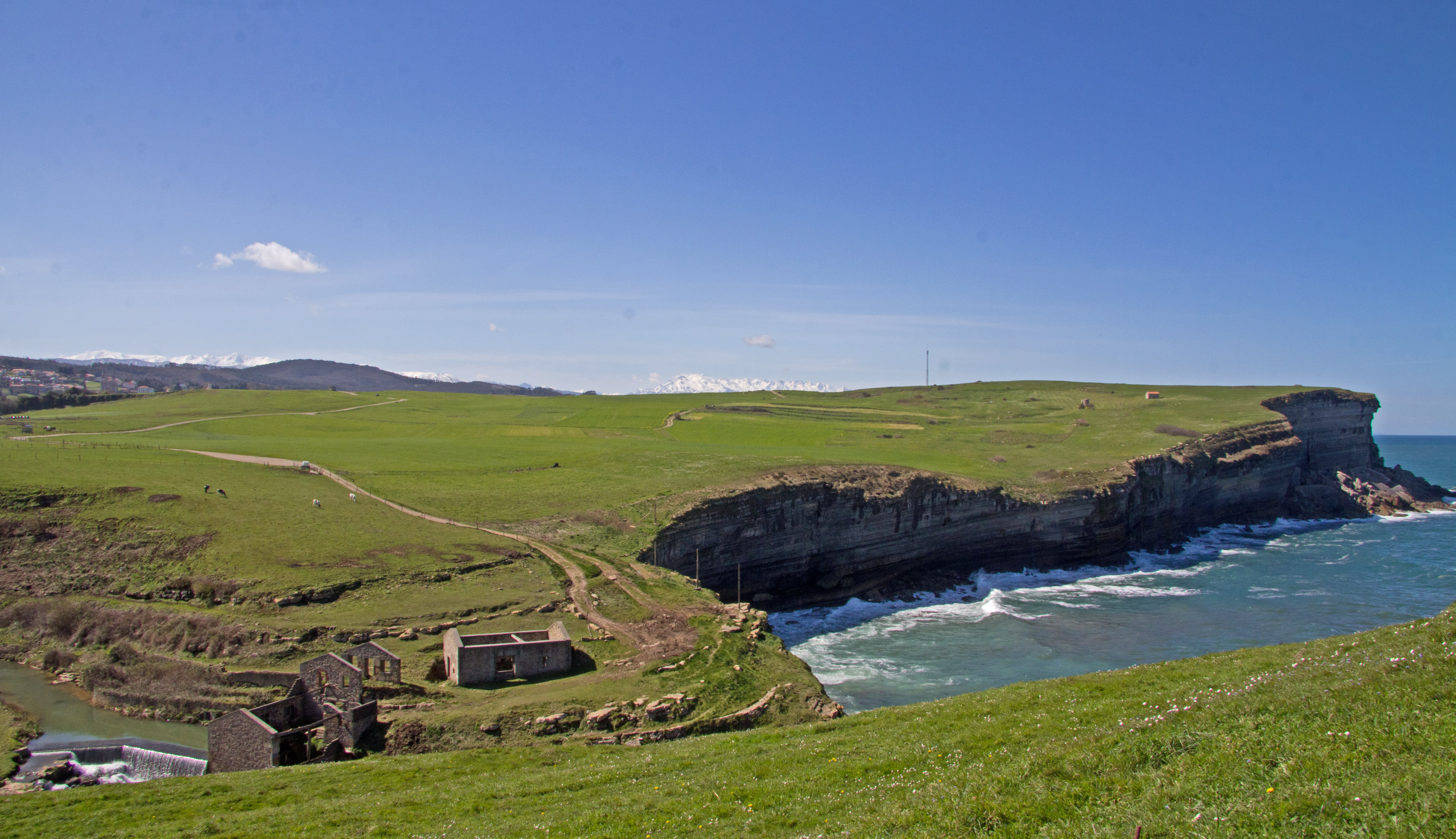
Toñanes cliffs and the Bolao waterfall.

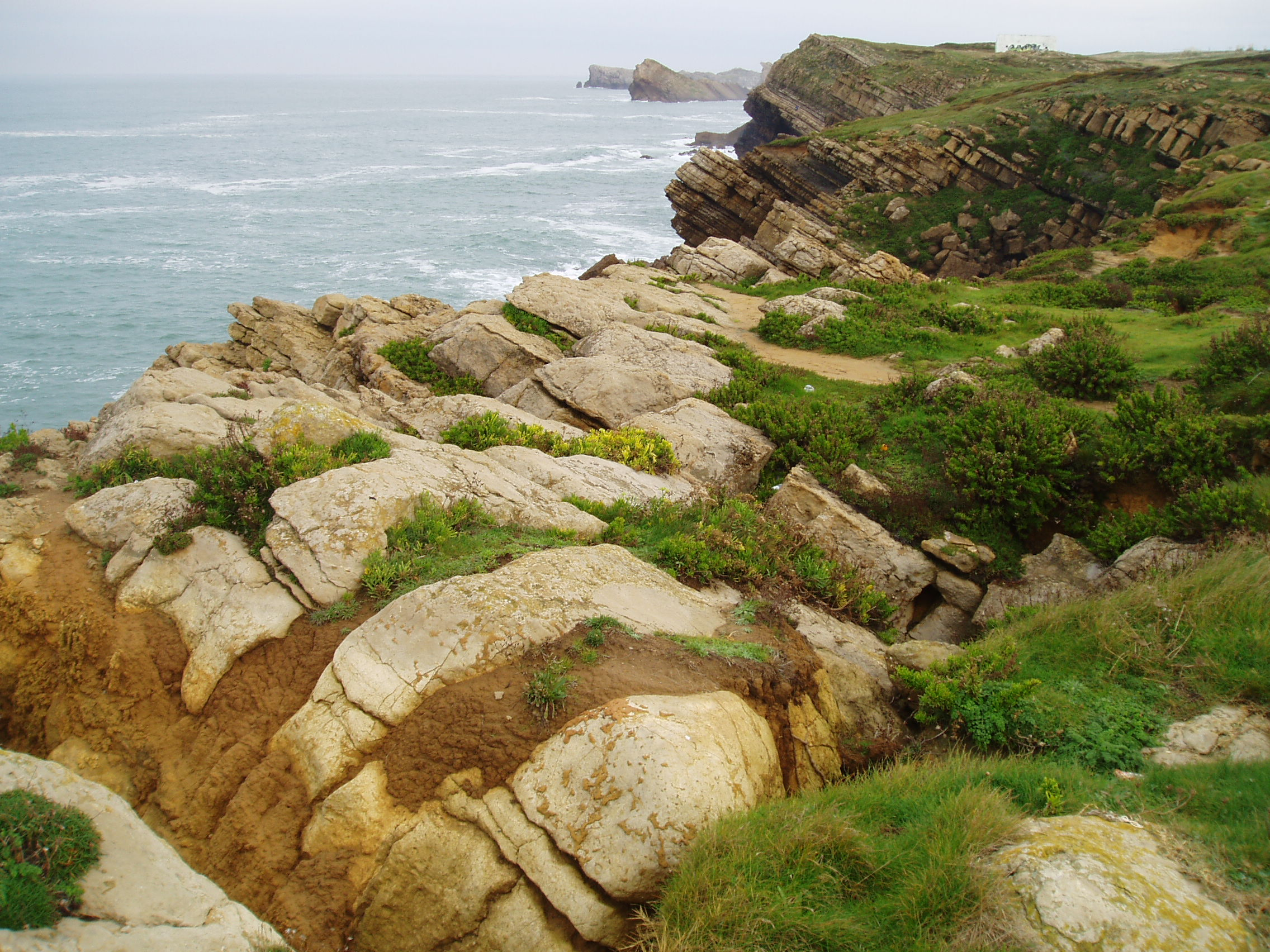
Flora of the cliffs in the natural park of Dunas de Liencres.

The cliff coasts of Cantabria, of vertical development and variable height, are home to communities adapted, as in the case of the dunes, to the proximity to the sea. These communities develop on two types of substrates: hard limestones, dominant on the surface in the region, and marl and sandstones, which are more brittle and have more developed soils.

The first vegetation belt, the one closest to the sea, is characterized by the presence of herbaceous species growing in the fissures of the rocks, such as sea fennel (Crithmum maritimum) or sea plantain (Plantago maritima) and, in more protected fissures, spleenworts (Asplenium marinum).

Moving towards the edges of the cliff, the vegetation becomes more abundant, also including Armenia maritima (Armenia maritima and A. pubigera ssp. depillata) and sea lavender (Limonium lanceolatum), to the east of the estuary of San Martín de la Arena, in Suances. The areas where it is not possible for upper vegetation to take root are colonized by lichens, such as Xantoria parietina or Verrucaria maura.

The emergence of more spread out areas where vegetation settles more easily makes possible the appearance of new species such as wild carrot (Daucus carota ssp. gummifer), Portuguese angelica (Angelica pachycarpa) or sweet alyssum (Lobularia maritima), accompanied by small meadows of grasses dominated by red fescue (Festuca rubra).

Finally, in elevated areas, quite far from the sea, there are thickets of Cornish heath (Erica vagans), genista (Genista occidentalis) and gorse (Ulex europaeus).

=== Estuaries and marshes ===
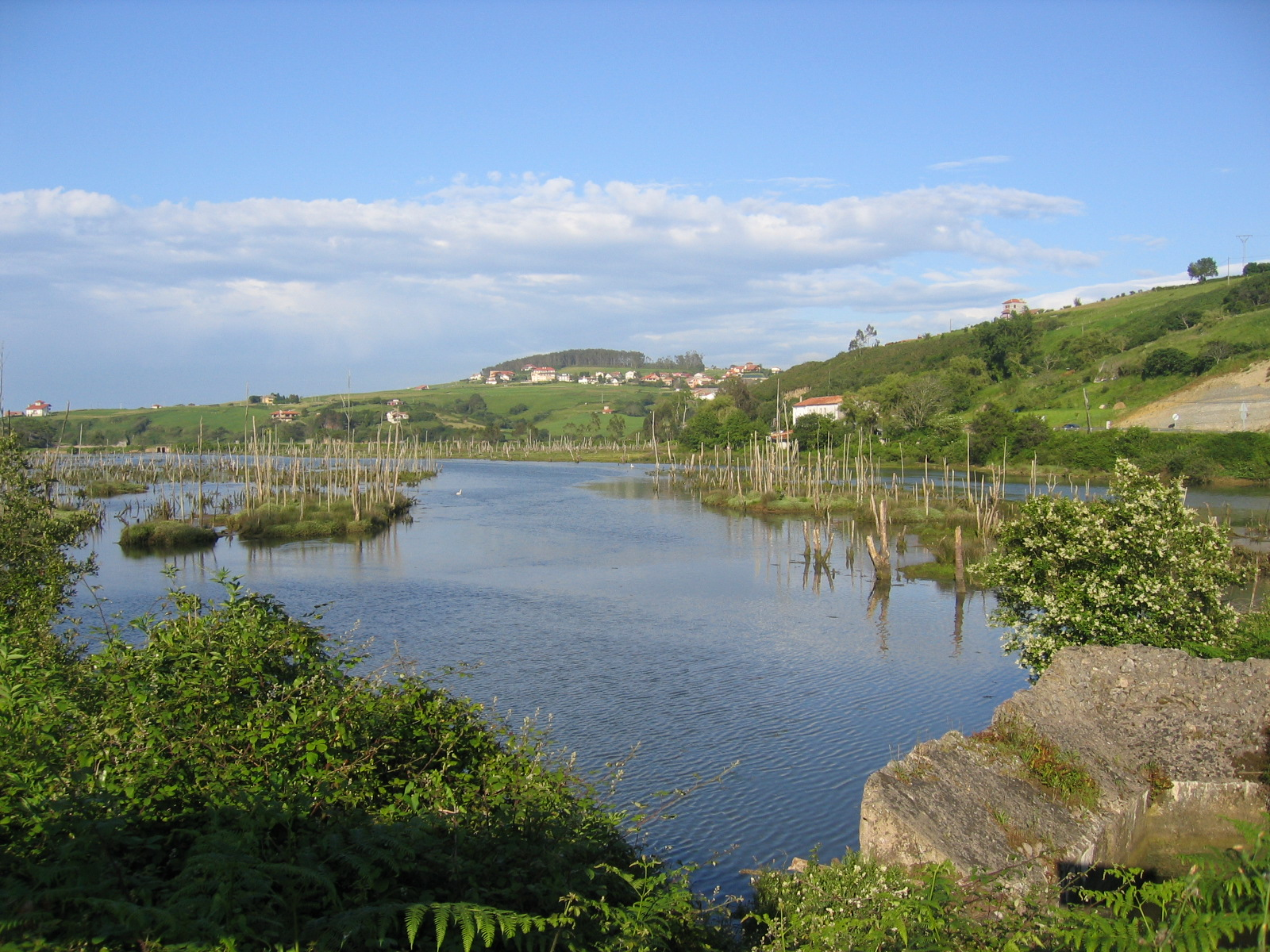
Halophytic marsh vegetation (Cantabria).

The marshes constitute one of the habitats of greatest scientific interest, since they possess the highest biodiversity of all the existing ecosystems in Cantabria. In Cantabria, the marsh communities are well developed in Santoña, Victoria and Joyel Marshes Natural Park in the Rabia estuary, and in the two Tinas (Tinamayor and Tinamenor). As in the case of the dunes, their conservation is threatened by the urban development pressure in their surroundings.

These communities form a complex of floristic associations with a very diverse distribution, atomized and variable in space, responding mainly to the degree of salinity of the environment.

The marshes of Cantabria have, in the areas most flooded by sea water, meadows of Zostera marina and Zostera noltii, both species in danger of extinction on the European Atlantic coast. Near the lower tidal level, cordgrass (Spartina spp.) appears, followed by salicornia (Salicornia spp.) or limonium (Limonium vulgare). Finally, in the areas farther from the sea, with less influence of salt water (such as river mouths, banks of canals and ponds), there are rushes and reed beds of Juncus spp., common reed (Phragmites australis) and Scirpus spp.

=== Hay meadows ===
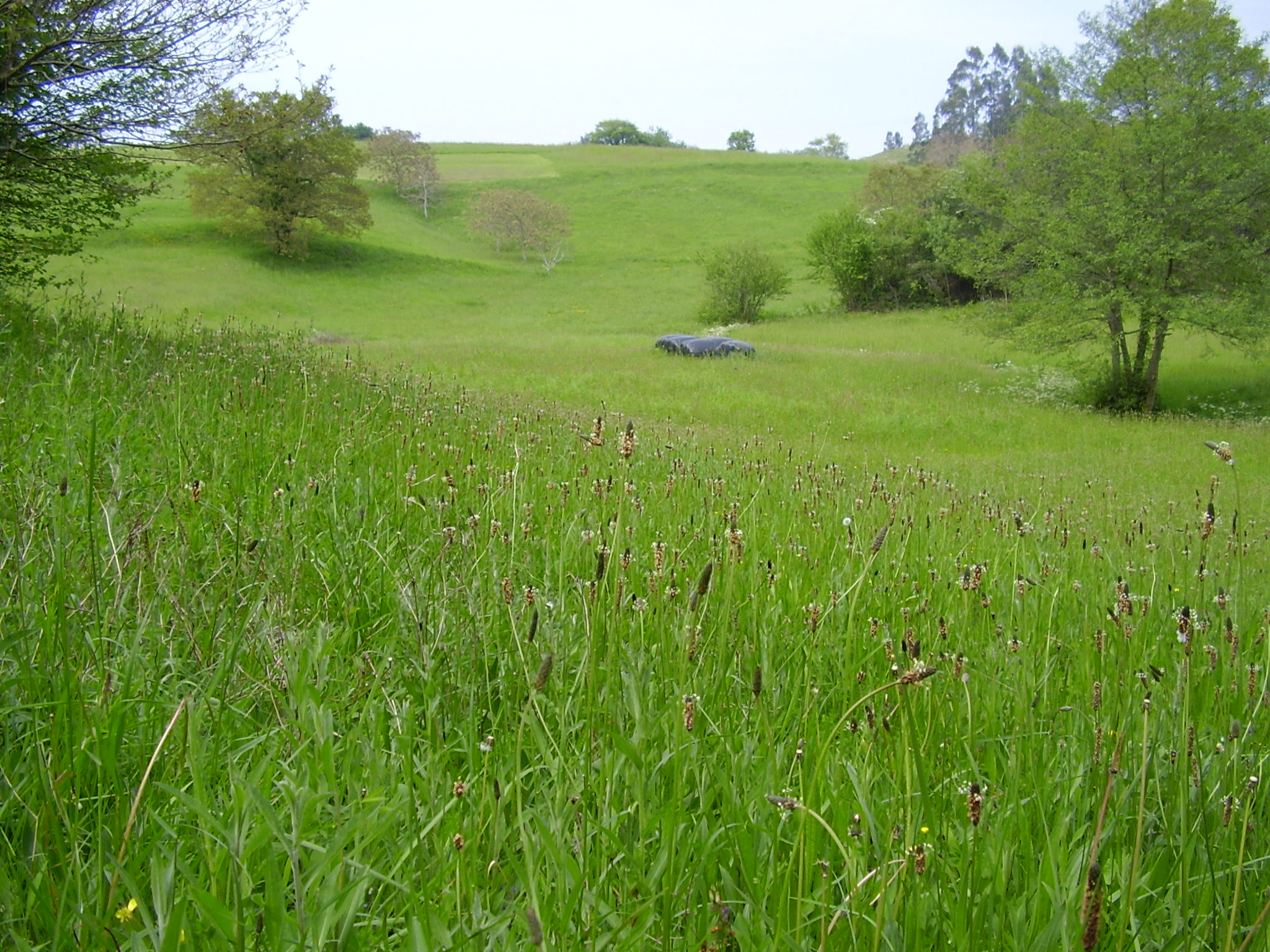
Mowing meadows in the municipality of Valdáliga.

Beyond the strictly coastal area, the vegetation landscape is characterized by the dominance of intensively managed mowing meadows, in which forage gramineae such as Lolium perenne, Holcus lanatus, Anthoxanthum odoratum, etc. appear, intermingled with leguminous plants such as cloverslike Trifolium pratense or Trifolium repens. These meadows are the plant formation that occupy the largest area in the region, distributed in large spaces with very few trees on their margins and with hardly any hedges separating the farms.

=== Mixed deciduous forests ===
Distributed in valleys and enclaves that are difficult to manage due to their excessive slope, there are few remains of the type of forest characteristic of this colline level, the mixed forest (deciduous multispecific). They are composed of a mixture of different species, among which the common oak (Quercus robur) dominates, accompanied by ash (Fraxinus excelsior), maple (Acer pseudoplatanus), birch (Betula celtiberica), linden (Tilia spp. ), chestnut (Castanea sativa) and a large number of tall shrubs such as common hazel (Corylus avellana), alder buckthorn (Rhamnus frangula), dogwood (Cornus sanguinea) or laurel (Laurus nobilis), interspersed with lianas and epiphytes, thickets and herbaceous plants. These forests, with a great floristic diversity in their undergrowth, used to occupy the best soils of the territory, so they have been massively displaced from their natural habitat to plant crops, constituting the most transformed forest mass and therefore the one of most interest for its restoration.

=== Holm oak forests ===
Within the colline level of the region, on the rocky limestone beds, and in general on carbonate rocks, a plant formation of major interest is Cantabrian holm oak forest. This type of forest is made up of Mediterranean species, among which the holm oak (Quercus ilex) dominates, accompanied by laurel (Laurus nobilis), strawberry trees (Arbutus unedo), buckthorns (Rhamnus alaternus), etc., all of them evergreen, intermingled with Atlantic species such as hazel (Corylus avellana), or hawthorn (Crataegus monogyna). These holm oak forests, located outside their climatic optimum, need a substrate of a certain degree of aridity, so they take refuge in the limestone rocks due to their high permeability. The best holm oak forests are located in the Asón valley and in the Aras valley. In the coastal fringe, the holm oak forest of Monte Buciero in Santoña stands out. Due to its extension, its location and its contact with the cliff formations, it is undoubtedly the holm oak forest of greatest scientific interest in the north of the peninsula.

At the bottom of valleys of marked summer drought, such as those of Liébana, where the climatic characteristics are more Mediterranean, holm oak (Quercus ilex ssp. rotundifolia) appears, typical of areas of low rainfall, and do not present a marked dependence on limestone rocks. Kermes oak groves appear in Valderredible, around Villaescusa de Ebro, and especially in Liébana. The four valleys of Liébana have kermes oak groves that end up being the dominant vegetation at their confluence in Potes. Particularly noteworthy are Maredes and Valmeo, in the Cereceda Valley (Vega de Liébana), and Aniezo in Valdeprado (Pesaguero).

=== Riverside forests ===
The riparian forests in Cantabria are formed mainly of alnus (Alnus glutinosa). The alnus groves are practically the only riverside forests in Cantabria, at least in the lower areas. In the higher areas where alder cannot survive, there are other forest communities associated with the river courses.

In the alder groves, there are also a considerable number of trees and shrubs with a rich herbaceous substrate. The main element is alder, together with elm (Ulmus glabra) and ash (Fraxinus excelsior). Other frequent trees are willows (Salix spp.). Beeches and oaks are also occasionally found.

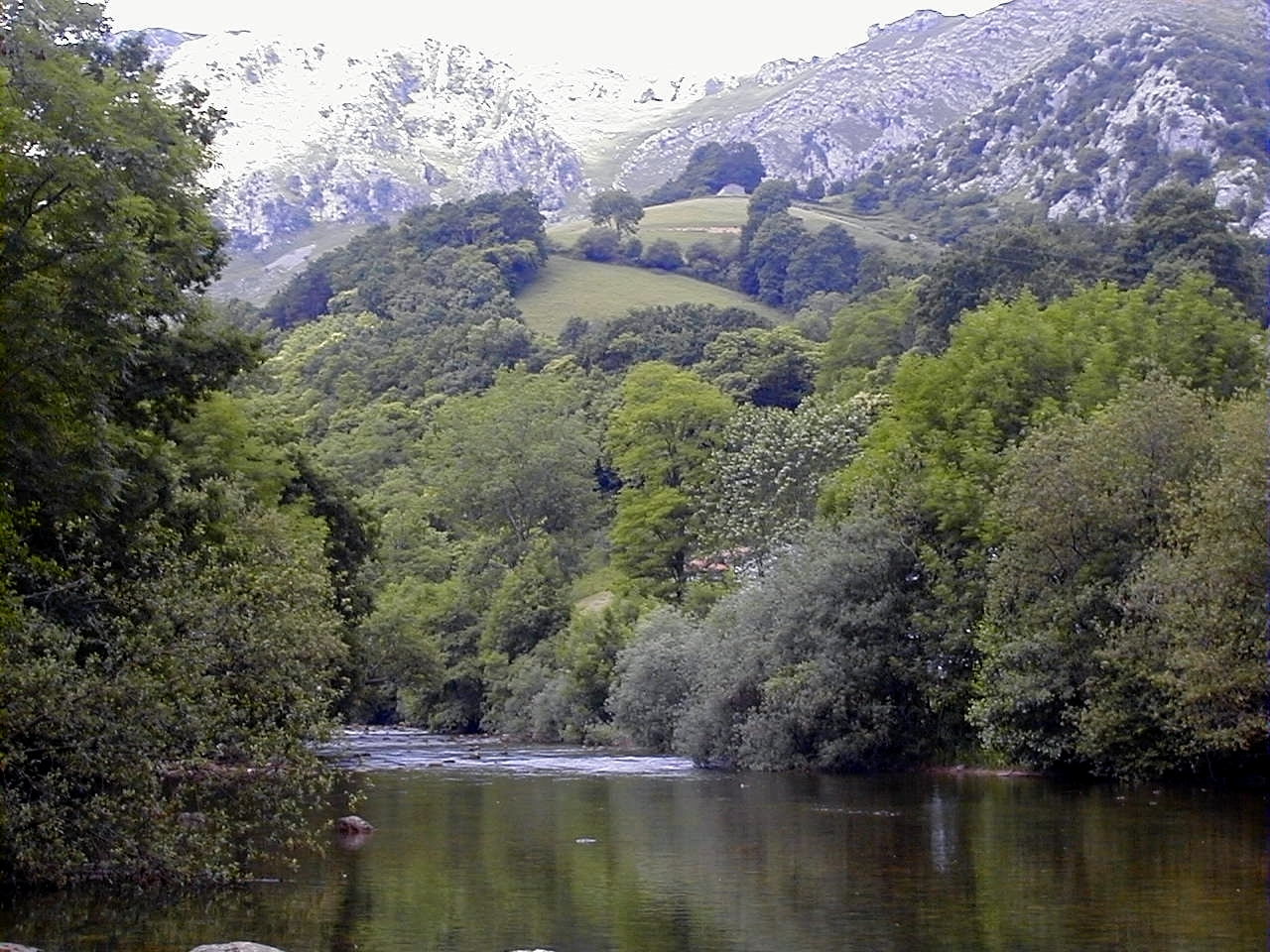
Riverside vegetation in the Asón river, in the municipality of Arredondo.

The shrub substrate is dominated by small willows (Salix spp. or salgueras) such as S. atrocinerea, S. cantabrica and S. purpurea. Other common shrubs are dogwood (Cornus sanguinea) or spindle (Euonymus europaeus) that, together with various brambles (Rubus sp.) and lianas (Hedera helix, Rubia peregrina), characterize these forest formations.

In the herbaceous stratum, Carex remota, C. pendula or Bromus ramosus stand out together with widely distributed plants such as nettle (Urtica dioica), which are favored by the detritus provided by the floods in these areas.

In Cantabria, alder groves are concentrated in the middle and lower areas of the rivers of the Cantabrian slope and in the Ebro. However, the Camesa, which flows into the Duero basin, lacks this riparian formation, probably due to the altitude of the areas through its course. When the valleys are very steep, the surface that can occupy the riparian forest is reduced, even disappearing and being replaced by mixed oak groves, as happens in the middle stretch of the Miera in Mortesante or in the Nansa, in the town of Rozadío in Rionansa.

Another formation associated with riverbanks are willows or shrubby salcedas, a pioneer formation that is installed as a barrier between the riverbed and alder groves. They also play a role as replacement vegetation when alder groves are destroyed, as well as constituting the dominant vegetation of the riverbanks in those mountain areas that lack alder groves due to altitude, generally above 1000 meters. In these areas, the dominant vegetation consists of several species of the genus Salix, (different types of willows), depending on the environmental and geographical conditions. S. cantabrica and S. atrocinerea dominate the willow groves of the southwestern part of the region, which prefer streams that maintain a constant minimum level that is not excessively torrential. Where the torrential level is more pronounced, the willows are dominated by S. elaeagnos ssp. angustifolia. In some areas of the lower river courses, there are groups of Salix alba, especially in the lower course of the Deva in Molleda (Val de San Vicente). These formations, with a tree stratum dominated by this willow, are located on very sandy soils.

=== Eucalyptus ===
In these low levels of the region, between sea level and 300 meters of altitude, the native vegetation has been destroyed in many areas to artificially implant the other dominant formation in the vegetation landscape of the coast of Cantabria, eucalyptus. These monospecific masses of the exotic Australian species Eucalyptus globulus have been planted for their use in the production of paper pulp. The plantations existing in Cantabria constitute the largest extensions of this species in the European continent and, on many occasions, they have been planted at the cost of destroying the real autochthonous Cantabrian forests. The area devastated by the plantation of this timber species exceeded all admissible thresholds a long time ago, especially considering the disastrous influence it has on soils and aquifers, and on the homogenization and loss of biodiversity, especially noticeable in areas such as Guriezo. Eucalyptus plantations are industrial crops, authentic plantations of stakes, and, therefore, in no case should they be called forests, since they have nothing to do with them.

The eucalyptus plantations of Cantabria have a wide variety of regenerated native species according to the data collected by the Cantabria Forest Damage Network, which is prepared by the General Directorate of Forestry together with the company Tragsatec. This network evaluates, among other parameters, the regeneration of species in the undergrowth, finding among the existing scrub and depending on the area, regenerated Quercus robur, Frangula alnus, Arbutus unedo, Quercus ilex and sometimes even Fagus sylvatica. The main problem of this type of crop is its plantation framework and its utilization system, as well as the lack of silvicultural treatments in all its growth stages, along with the burns with which the remains of its cutting are disposed of in most cases, causing this regeneration not to thrive. On the other hand, given that these studies on the regeneration of native species are carried out by the General Directorate of Forestry and Tragsatec, which are interested parties in the pulp business, their credibility is null and void.

== Montane level ==
The montane level in Cantabria is distributed variably between 500 and 1600 meters of altitude. At this level, the most thermophilic species disappear due to the effect of frost, and the forests are more homogeneous and have less floristic diversity.

The vegetal landscape of the montane floor differs notably from that of the colline, as it enters more abrupt zones, where the hay meadows are notably reduced and the scrub becomes dominant on the surface, regressive vegetation of the ancient forests that used to cover the slopes in the past. These forests remain in the form of isolated patches, generally at the head of valleys and on steep slopes, not very accessible to human activity, in contact with the rocks and high pastures, already at the upper limit of the montane level.

The plant communities of this level include different types of oak forests, beech forests, birch forests, cork oak forests and heath forests which originated as a consequence of the degradation of previous communities.

=== Oak forests of Quercus robur ===
The oak grove of Quercus robur (common oak) develops in Cantabria up to 1000 meters of altitude. In these formations, there are also ash trees (Fraxinus excelsior), lime trees (Tilia spp.) and chestnut trees (Castanea sativa) and a large number of shrubs, such as holly (Ilex aquifolium), blackthorn (Prunus spinosa) or hazel (Corylus avellana). In the understory, various species of ferns (Dryopteris spp., Polystichum setiferum) and numerous herbaceous species such as hellebore (Helleborus viridis) or dog's mercury (Mercurialis perennis) are common.

This type of forest has suffered a strong regression as a result of its exploitation for shipbuilding during the sixteenth and seventeenth centuries, and for its use as fuel in forges and in the Royal Artillery Factory of La Cavada. Thus, its sparse and fragmented distribution may endanger the persistence and recovery of this species, symbolic of the pre-Roman peoples of the northern Iberian Peninsula. The last surviving oak forests in Cantabria are located in the mountain range that separates the Saja and Besaya valleys, such as Rucieza and Guzaporos in Cieza, Montequemau and Rodil in Iguña, Monte Aá in Ruente and Viaña in Cabuérniga.

=== Sessile oak forests (Quercus petraea) ===
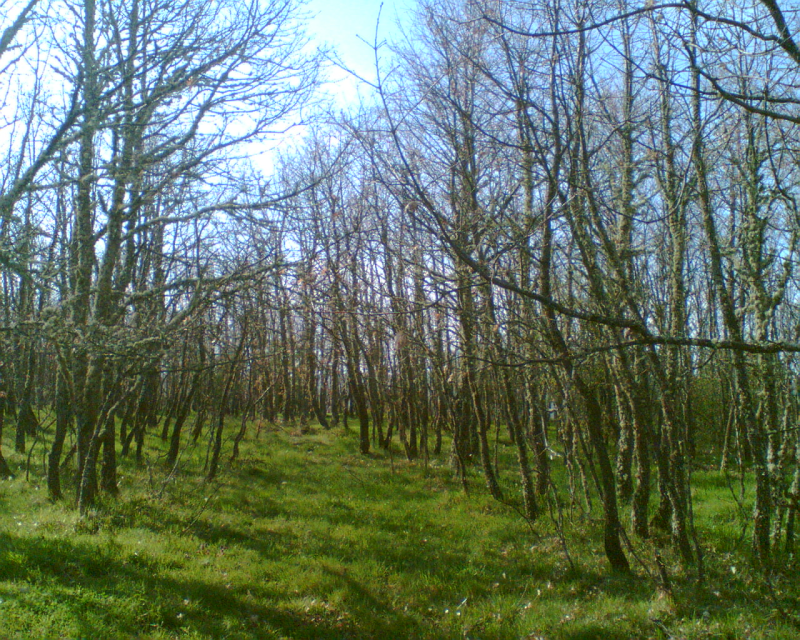
Young oak grove near Navamuel (Valderredible).

The sessile oak grove (Quercus petraea) replaces the ones found in the higher elevations, in more inland territories and isolated from the sea. These have a continental character but are sometimes hybridized with the previous ones, extending up to approximately 1700 meters of altitude, preferring slopes with sunny exposure. Accompanying the dominant species, there are also beech (Fagus sylvatica) and rowan (Sorbus aucuparia). The shrub layer of these environments is mainly composed of heather (Erica arborea) and broom (Cytisus cantabricus), interspersed with holly (Ilex aquifolium) and hazel (Corylus avellana). The herbaceous substrate is similar to that of the common oak groves, with wood sorrel (Oxalis acetosella) or martagon (Lilium martagon) also appearing.

The distribution of this type of forest in Cantabria includes the interior valleys of the south and west of the region, from Liébana and Polaciones to Campoo, the upper basin of the Saja and Valderredible, where the best preserved example is found on Mount Hijedo.

=== Pyrenean oak forests (Quercus pyrenaica) ===
Pyrenean oak groves (Quercus pyrenaica) are common on the northern slopes of the Cantabrian Mountains, especially in the drier areas of the valleys where the beech or oak groves cannot develop due to their high water dependence, distributed from 700 to 1400 meters of altitude. Other tree species accompanying them are ash (Fraxinus excelsior) and maple (Acer campestre), while the shrub substrate is mainly composed of blackthorn (Prunus spinosa), holly (Ilex aquifolium) and broom (Cytisus cantabricus). In the herbaceous stratum, species such as Melampyrum pratense or Chamaespartium tridentatus are prominent.

Although small stands of this forest appear throughout the region, the best examples are located on the slopes of Peña Sagra, especially Valderrodíes in Aniezo and Bárago.

=== Portuguese oak forests (Quercus faginea) ===
The oak groves of gall oak or Portuguese oaks (Quercus faginea) are typically Mediterranean forests and very rare in the Cantabrian Mountains. In Cantabria, there are only a few isolated forests in places with particular mesoclimatic conditions, such as Liébana or Campoo-Los Valles, where they always appear on limestone substratum on steep slopes and sunny orientations, between 700 and 1000 meters above sea level. The shrub layer of these formations is very diverse, highlighting species of dry environments such as Viburnum lantana or Rhamnus catharticus. The herbaceous stratum is of great interest, highlighting, along with species of wider distribution, species very rare in Cantabria, such as Artemisia alba.

The best representation of this type of formation in Cantabria is found in La Robleda mountain, in Villacantid (Hermandad de Campoo de Suso). It is also remarkable around Arcera (Valdeprado del Río). In Liébana, only small scattered groups persist.

=== Beech forests ===
Beech groves (Fagus sylvatica) are the best preserved forest ecosystem in Cantabria. They develop between 800 and 1600 meters of altitude, in areas of frequent fog and high rainfall. In Cantabria there are three types of beech forests, depending on the characteristics of the soil on which they grow.

The most abundant are the oligotrophic beech forests that settle on acid soils, in which the mature stage corresponds to a dense forest of beech (Fagus sylvatica) that becomes practically exclusive, with a herbaceous understory where the most acidophilic species such as Deschampia flexuosa, blueberry (Vaccinium myrtillus), Luzula sylvatica subs. henriquesii, etc., develop.

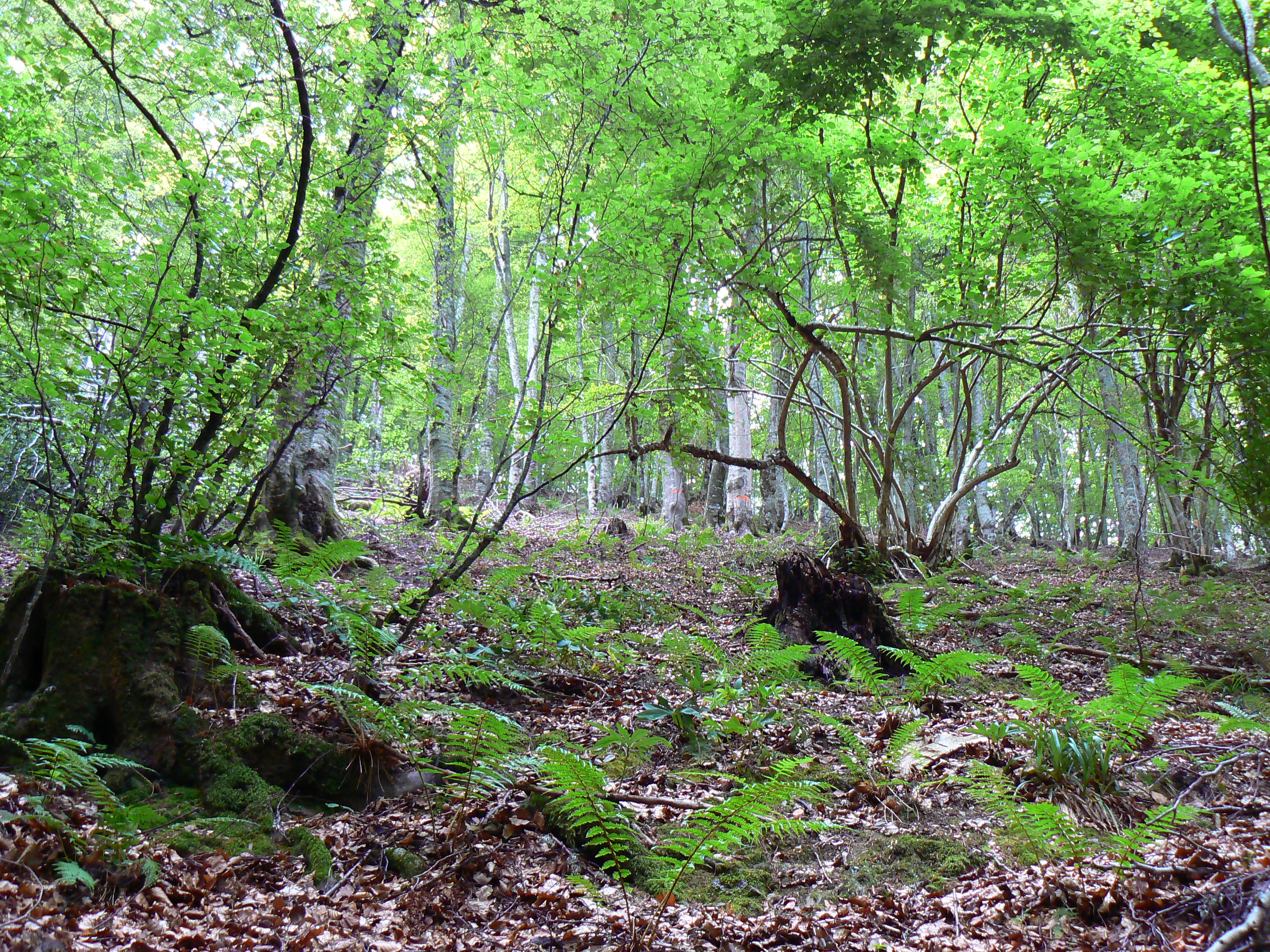
Beech forest in the foothills of the Piedrasluengas pass (Pesaguero).

The next most abundant are the ombrophilous and basophilous beech forests - beech forests in areas with lots of water but limestone soils. These beech forests are especially abundant in the large limestone massifs of the easternmost sector of the autonomous community.

Finally, the scarcer beech forests, located on limestone soils but on steep slopes and more sunny orientations, are the xerophilous beech forests, located at the limits of the distribution of this species, in the south of the region.

Beech groves are forests where the dominant species leave very few opportunities for other tree species and generally lack the shrub layer. The herbaceous stratum is homogeneous and poorly developed, due to the scarce amount of light that reaches this level. Among the most significant species are wild garlic (Allium ursinum) and orchid Neottia nidos-avis.

The largest beech forests in Cantabria are located in Campoo, the headwaters of the Nansa and Saja rivers and, above all, in Liébana, especially between Pido and Cosgaya (Camaleño) and descending from Peña Sagra and Piedrasluengas towards Liébana in Pesaguero. However, there are isolated and smaller beech forests in the rest of the region, at the headwaters of the Besaya, Pas, Miera or Asón rivers.

=== Birch forests ===
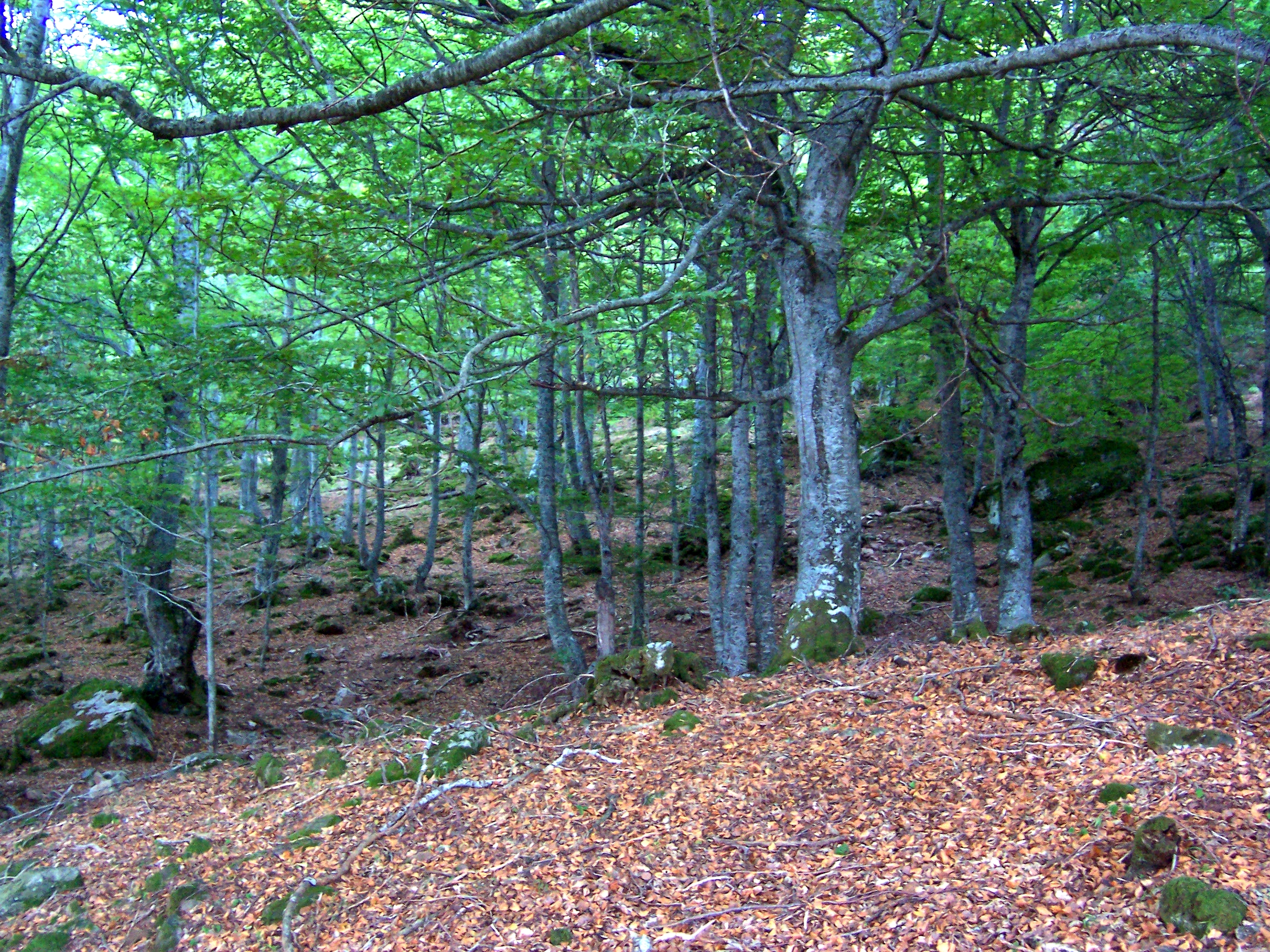
Umbrañal beech forest (La Lomba).

Birch forests develop between 1600 and 2000 meters in the western part of Cantabria, above the distribution limit of other deciduous forests. Birch forests (Betula celtiberica) grow in very poor acid soils in areas of high rainfall. The birch is accompanied by a few trees, including rowan (Sorbus aucuparia) and some isolated specimens of beech (Fagus sylvatica), the undergrowth being occupied by species characteristic of the Cantabrian high mountains such as heather (Erica arborea, Calluna vulgaris), broom (Genista spp.) or blueberry (Vaccinium myrtillus). The herbaceous substrate is dominated by species typical of siliceous soils such as Avenella flexuosa.

The best preserved birch groves in Cantabria are found at the headwaters of the Deva, Nansa, Saja and Híjar basins, with the Ajotu birch grove at the headwaters of the Tanea river (Lamasón) standing out.

=== Cork oak forests ===
The very few cork oak groves that exist in Cantabria, all of them in Liébana, are found on siliceous soils, halfway between the montane and the hilly areas. It is a typical species of the Mediterranean region that shuns cold and excessively dry climates and that appears in Cantabria in a relict form. The dominant species, the cork oak (Quercus suber), is accompanied by a rich shrub substrate formed mainly of strawberry trees (Arbutus unedo), buckthorns (Rhamnus alaternus), sloes (Prunus spinosa) or hawthorns (Crataegus monogyna), as well as some brooms (Cytisus cantabricus, Genista spp.).

The best cork oak groves are those of Tolibes and Valmayor, in Valmeo (Vega de Liébana) and the one that extends from Frama to Cahecho (Cabezón de Liébana).

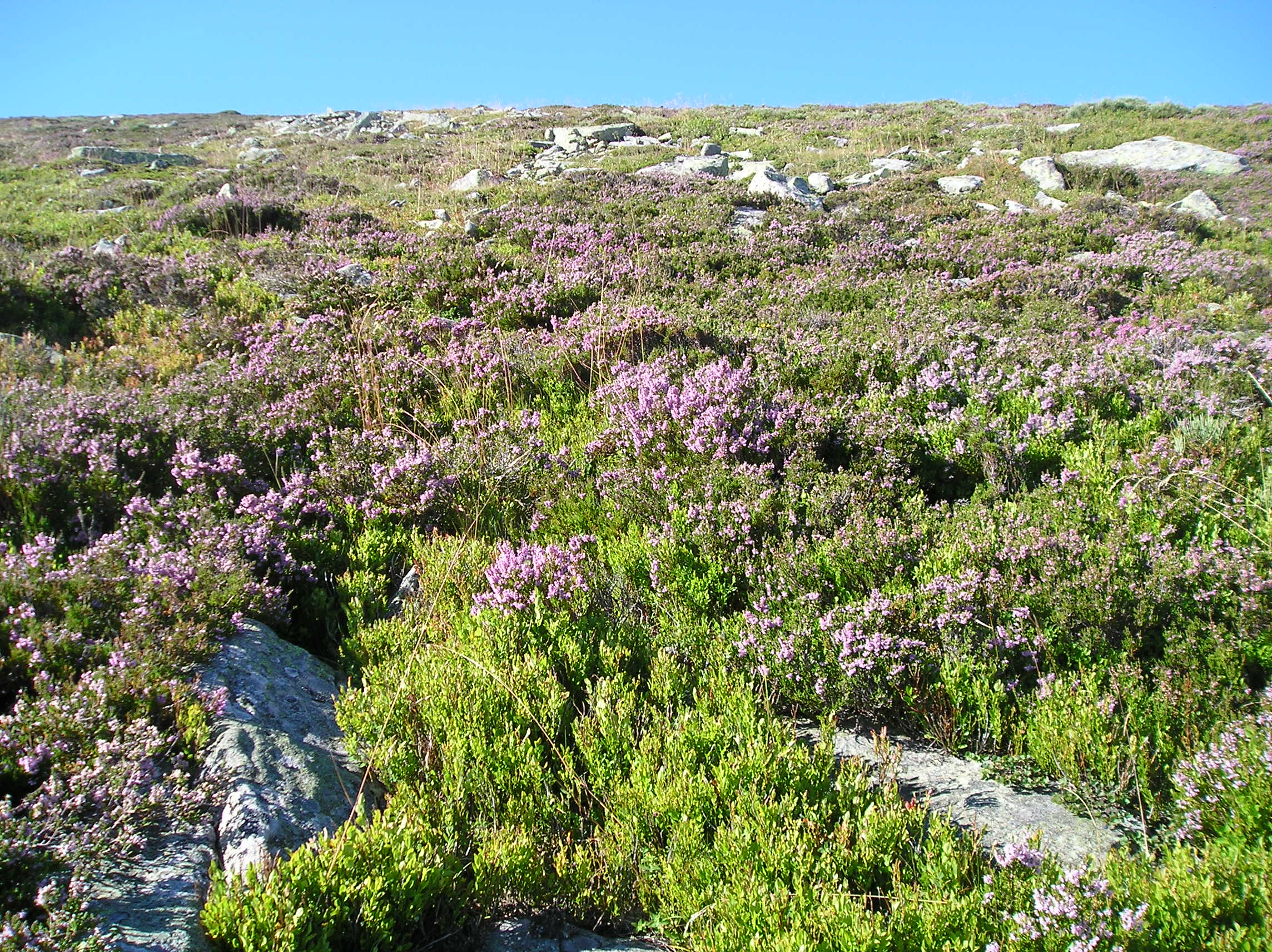
Mixed heath forest of Calluna vulgaris in Campoo.

=== Heath forests ===
Heathlands are the most common formations in the montane landscapes of the region. They appear as replacement vegetation after the elimination of the deciduous forest to establish tooth pastures, either by cutting or, more frequently, by wildfires.

These formations, which are usually dominated by different species of heather, have a great floristic diversity, with numerous taxa of endemic flora, such as Erica mackaiana, Daboecia cantabrica, Calluna vulgaris or Genista obtusirramea and are considered habitats of community interest by the Habitat Directive of the European Union.

== Alpine subnival level ==
The next altitudinal level, the subalpine, is located in Cantabria from 1600 to 1700 meters of altitude, although these heights can be variable. It is fully present in the summits of the Picos de Europa and in the western part of the Cantabrian Mountains, appearing also, although with a very reduced extension, in the Castro Valnera. The main formations of this stratum in Cantabria are grasslands, different types of high mountain scrub and bogland.

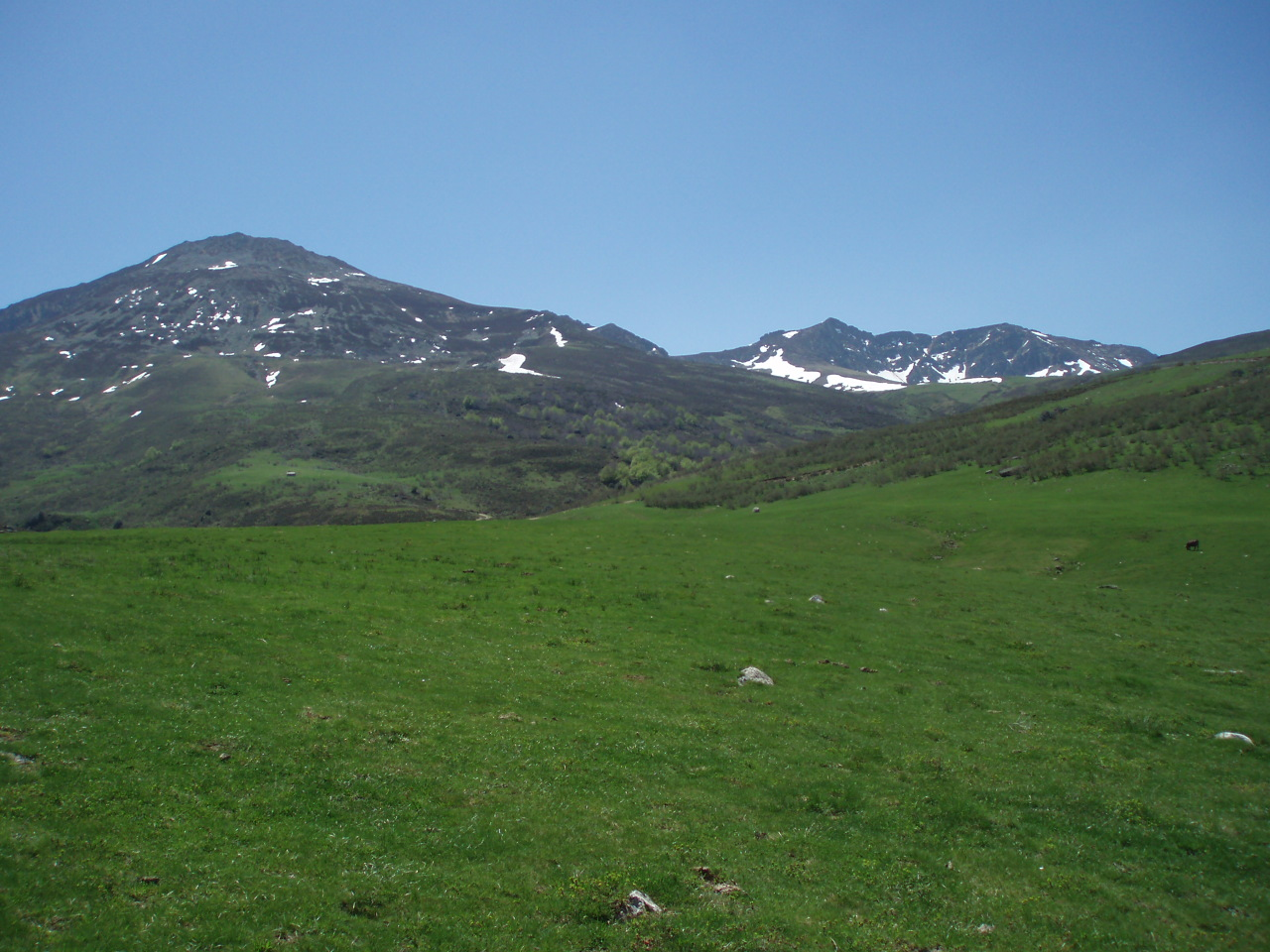
Puertos de Sejos.

=== Grasslands ===
The high mountain pastures, called brañas, constitute the climatic vegetation in the highest areas of Cantabria, which are adapted to situations of very prolonged snowfall, and whose floristic composition is highly dependent on the substratum. They cover the natural passes that form between the great masses of rock that occupy the altitudinal ceiling of the region. They are generally accompanied by shrub thickets, typical of the Cantabrian mountains (heather, gorse and broom).

There are various types of grasslands, in terms of their floristic composition, depending on the type of soil on where they are located, with numerous endemic species, such as Helianthemum urrielense and Festuca burnatii.

The high altitude pastures are the food for the cattle in the mountain passes during the summer, such as Sejos and Áliva passes.

=== High mountain scrub ===
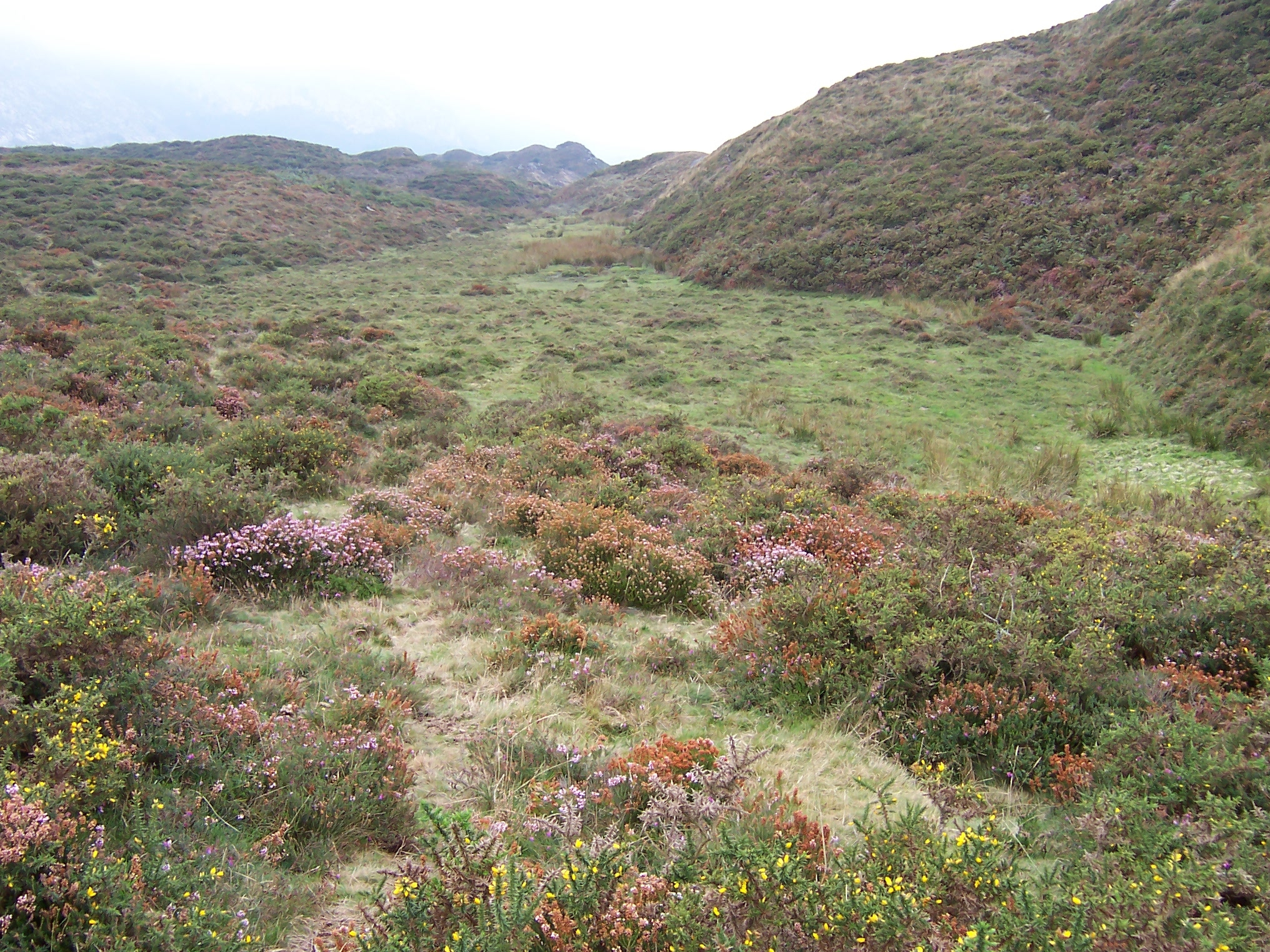
High mountain scrublands in Campoo.

In the limestone mountains, which at these altitudes are reduced to the mountainous massif of the Picos de Europa, juniper groves develop, dominated by the common juniper (Juniperus communis subsp. alpina) accompanied by other species such as the bearberry (Arctostaphylos uva-ursi) or the spurge-laurel (Daphne laureola), which take refuge in the crags, spurs and stony ridges, in biotopes covered for a short time by snow. Acidophilic species such as blueberries (Vaccinium myrtilus, Vaccinium uliginosum) or heather (Calluna vulgaris) also appear in siliceous areas. In these subalpine landscapes, there is a great development of gorse, communities dominated by the Spanish gorse (Genista occidentalis), accompanied by another interesting orocantabrian endemism, Genista legionensis, which on rare occasions descends even to the hill floor, as long as there are adequate substrate conditions, as is the case in the vicinity of Carmona (Cabuérniga).

In the high mountains of Cantabria, two types of heathlands develop: Spanish heather (Erica australis subsp. aragonensis) and heather (Calluna vulgaris), although sometimes both formations are intermingled.

Finally, in the transition zones between the wooded formations and the high mountains, Pyrenean broom formed by Genista florida or Cytisus cantabricus develop.

=== Bogland ===
In the siliceous subalpine territories with high humidity, bogland communities, considered a priority interest by the Habitat Directive, have a considerable presence, made up of different species of sphagnum (Sphagnum spp.) that grow in waterlogged soils, forming convex masses. These peatlands are home to species exclusive to these environments such as Carex nigra subsp. carpetana, Scirpus caespitosus subsp. germanicus, or the carnivorous Drosera rotundifolia. The extension of peat bogs in Cantabria is very reduced, standing out for their interest those located in the Puertos de Río Frío (Vega de Liébana).

== Alpine level ==
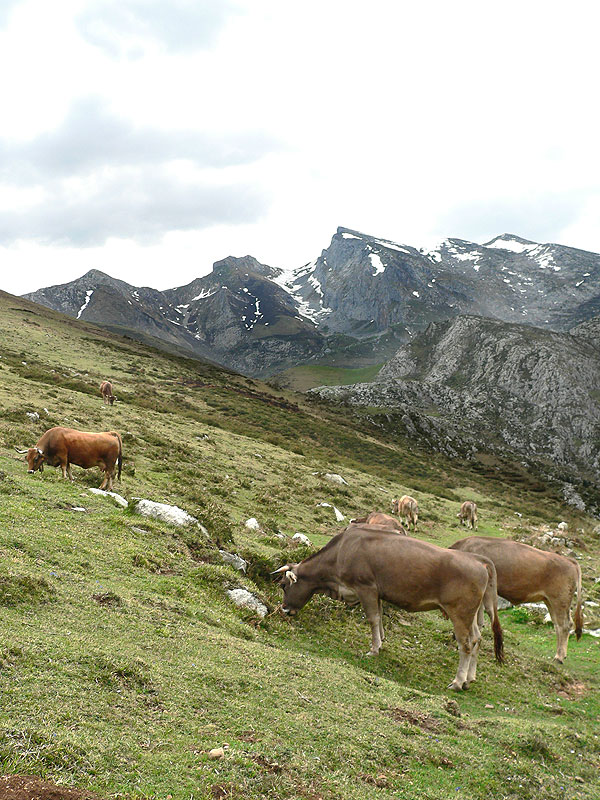
High mountain grasslands in Tresviso.

The last altitudinal level in Cantabria is the alpine level, restricted to the highest mountain peaks of the Picos de Europa and Peña Prieta. In these biotopes, located at 2200 meters of altitude, the abundant presence of snow and the abrupt relief prevents the development of the soil. The result is that it is impossible for woody vegetation to develop, so the ecological climax in these alpine environments is a natural grassland that varies greatly with the conditions of the substrate. On limestone substrates, mostly in Cantabria, a dense grassland appears, very characteristic, with species such as Elyna myosuroides or Salix breviserrata. In long snow-covered substrates, on more acid soils, present only on the summit of Peña Prieta, grasslands are formed by species such as Festuca eskia, Juncus trifidus or Luzula hispanica.

Finally, on the rocks of the rocky walls, taking advantage of the cracks and small landings where some soil accumulates, small species of great ecological importance develop. In these environments, endemic species such as Aster alpinus, Sempervivum vicentei cantabricum or Armeria cantabrica stand out.

== Protected flora species ==
In Cantabria, the Regional Catalog of Threatened Species was laid out in Decree 120/2008 of December 4, 2008, which regulates the regional catalog of threatened species as established in Cantabria Law 4/2006, of May 19, 2006, on Nature Conservation, which presumably includes flora species. This is in spite of the fact that, even before the Spanish Law 4/1989, of 27 March, on the Conservation of Natural Spaces and Wild Flora and Fauna, many protectionist provisions had been published in Cantabria, one of them for algal flora, ordered on 6 February 1984; BOC on 22 February.

Cantabria was the first Autonomous Community to develop a law for the protection of trees, Law 6/1984 of October 29, 1984, on the Protection and Promotion of Native Forest Species. This law establishes native forest species (common oak, sessile oak, Pyrenean oak, holly, holm oak, Portuguese oak, cork oak, beech, chestnut, ash, maple, linden, elm, birch, alder, yew, Scots pine, poplar, whitebeam) and the figure of the Singular Tree.

An order of March 4, 1986, declared the yew (Taxus baccata) a protected forest species.

The Catalog of Singular Trees of Cantabria, approved by order on May 28, 1986, in compliance with the aforementioned autonomous legislation, has been expanded in successive orders and represents the only specific protection of plant species in Cantabria. It includes and protects 214 specimens of trees of exceptional value, either for their beauty, size, longevity, species or symbolic character.

On the other hand, the Habitat Directive includes a series of flora and fauna taxa whose conservation is a priority for the European Union. The species of flora present in Cantabria that are included in the Habitat Directive are the following:

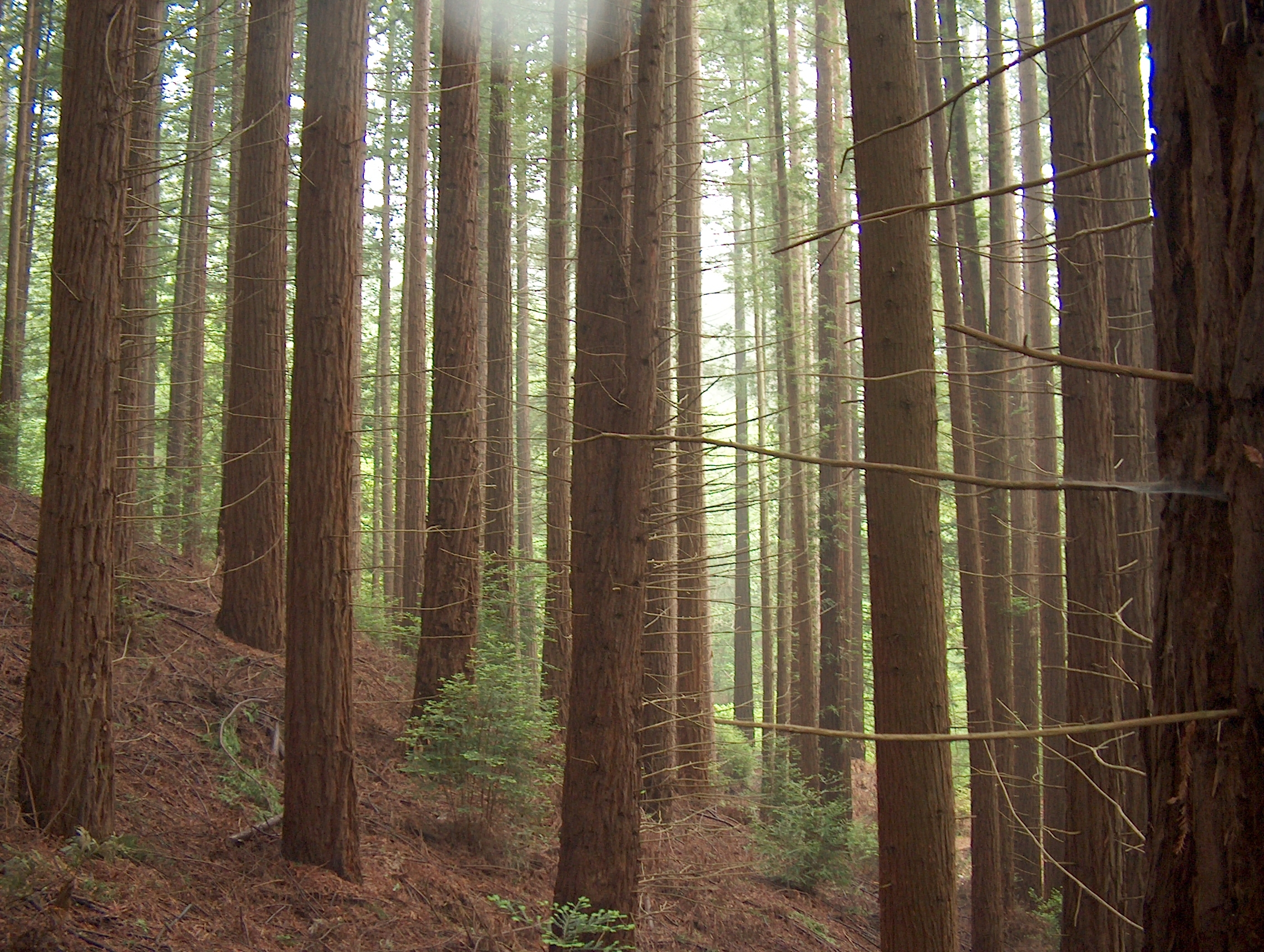
Redwoods of Monte Cabezón, declared a Natural Monument.

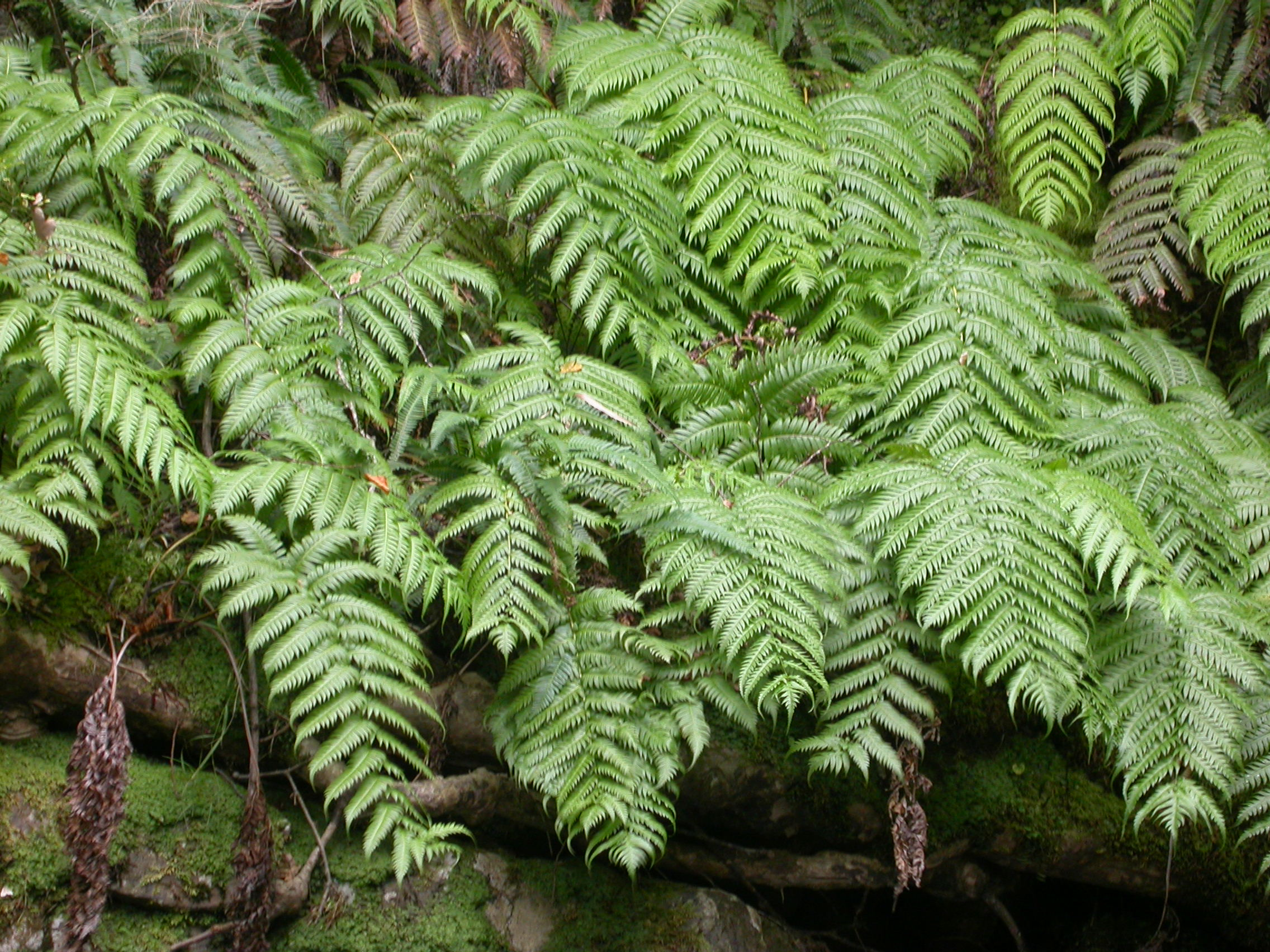
Woodwardia radicans.

Drepanocladus vernicosus.

Sphagnumpylaisii.

Culcita macrocarpa. Woolly tree fern.

Trichomanes speciosum.

Dryopteris corleyi. Asturian male fern.

Woodwardia radicans.

Rumex rupestris.

Eryngium viviparum.

Apium repens. Creeping marshwort.

Soldanella villosa. Snowbell.

Limonium lanceolatum Sea lavender.

Centaurium somedanum. Centaury.

Omphalodes littoralis.

Veronica micrantha.

Jasione lusitanica.

Santolina semidentata.

Centaurea borjae.

Aster pyrenaeus. Pyrenean aster.

Luronium natans. Floating water-plantain.

Narcissus pseudonarcissus nobilis. Wild daffodil.

Narcissus cyclamineus. Daffodil.

Narcissus asturiensis Pygmy daffodil.

Festuca elegans. Boiss.

Festuca summilusitanica.

== See also ==
- Forests of the Iberian Peninsula
- List of mammals of Cantabria
- Cantabria
- List of Amphibian and Reptile of Cantabria

== Bibliography ==
- Aedo, C., Diego, C, García Cordón, J. C. y Moreno, G. (1990). El bosque en Cantabria. University of Cantabria, Santander. 286 pp.
- Díaz, T., Loidi, J., Penas, A., Prieto, J. A. y Rivas Martínez, S. (1984). La vegetación de la alta montaña cantábrica: los Picos de Europa. Ediciones Leonesas S. A., León.
- Guinea, A. (1953). Geografía botánica de Santander. Diputación Provincial, Santander.
- Linares Argüelles, Mariano; Pindado Uslé, Jesús; Aedo Pérez, Carlos. Gran enciclopedia de Cantabria. Editorial Cantabria. 1985. ISBN 84-86420-00-8 (Complete work)] ISBN 84-86420-03-2 (Volume III).]
- Polunin, O. & Smythies, B. E. (1988). Flowers of South-west Europe. Oxford University Press. 480 pp.
- Rivas-Martínez, S.(1983) Pisos bioclimáticos de España. Lazaroa 5, 33–43.
- Vázquez, V. M. (1985). El bosque atlántico. MOPU, Unidades Temáticas Ambientales. Dirección General de Medio Ambiente, Madrid.
- VV. AA. (2000). Fauna y flora de Cantabria. Editorial Cantabria, S.A., Santander. 343 pp.
