= Liébana (wine) =

Wine region in Spain

Liébana VdlT
- Wine region
- Liébana VdlT in the region of Cantabria
- Type: Vino de la tierra
- Country: Spain

Liébana is a Spanish geographical indication for vino de la tierra wines located in the autonomous region of Cantabria on the north coast of Spain. Vino de la tierra is one step below the mainstream denominación de origen indication on the Spanish wine quality ladder.

The area covered by this geographical indication comprises the following municipalities in Cantabria: Potes, Pesaguero, Cabezón de Liébana, Camaleño, Cillorigo de Liébana and Vega de Liébana.

It acquired its vino de la tierra status in 2004.

== Grape varieties ==
Red: Mencía, Tempranillo, Garnacha, Graciano, Merlot, Syrah, Pinot noir, Albarín negro and Cabernet Sauvignon

White: Palomino, Godello, Verdejo, Albillo, Chardonnay and Albarín blanco
