= Salarzón =

Place in Cantabria, Spain

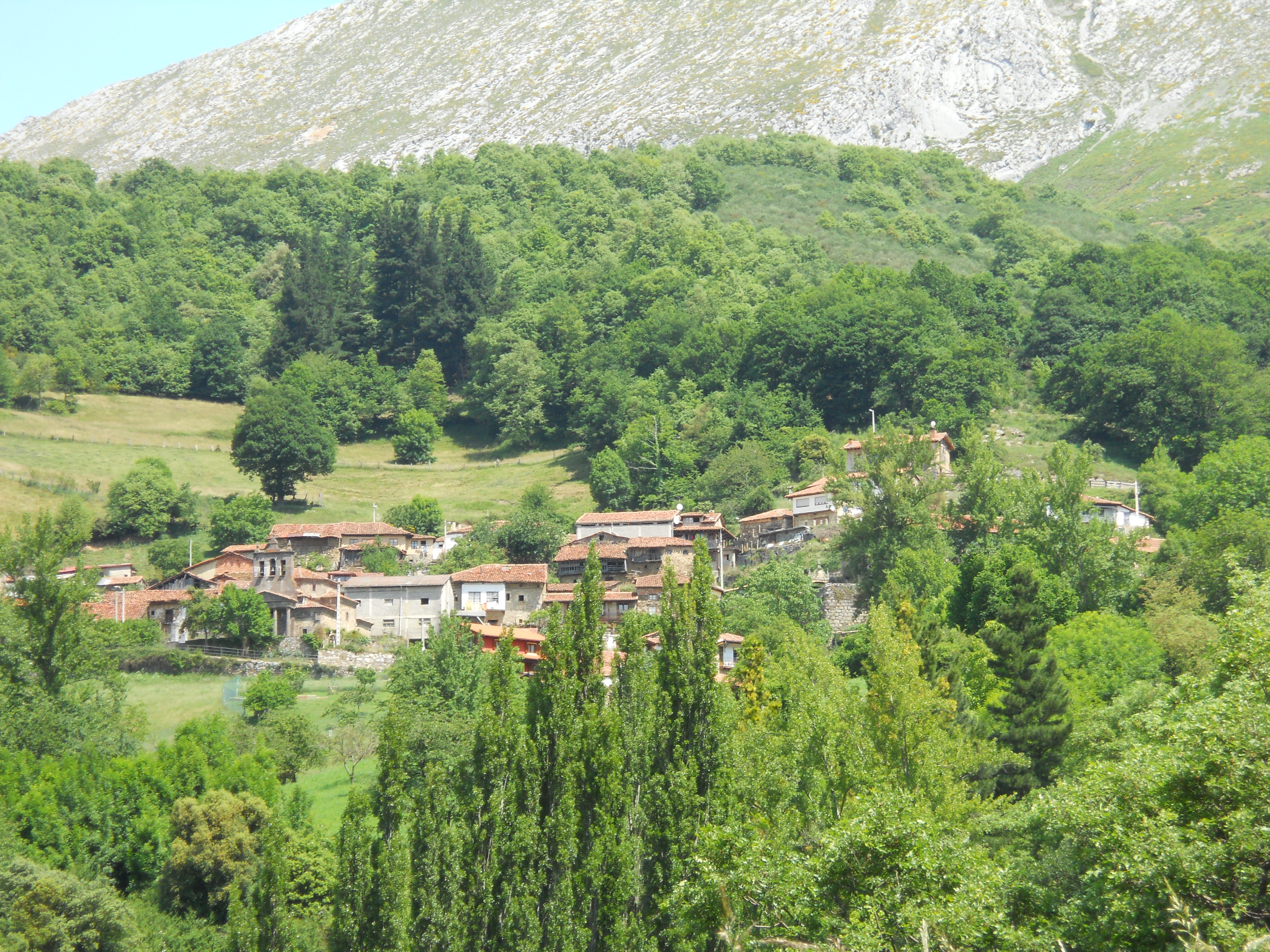
Salarzón

Salarzón is a locality of Cillorigo de Liébana municipality, in the Liébana region of Cantabria, Spain. It is located at 666 meters altitude and it is 6,8 kilometres far from Tama, the municipal capital. It has 33 inhabitants (INE, 2008). This neighborhood belongs to "Bedoya's Council", formed by several villages placed in the Bedoya Valley, near the Cillorigo Valley, in the western slope of Rock Sagra, Cantabrian Mountains.

Among Salarzón's architectural heritage the palace of Vicente Gómez de la Cortina y Salceda (1825) and the neoclassic church dated to the beginning of the 19th century stands out .

From this village departs the path to the Peña Ventosa, of 1.423 meters of altitude, which one finds between Salarzón and Lebeña; another trekking route departs from San Pedro of Bedoya. This limestone mountain is difficult to climb.
