= Potes =

- Municipality
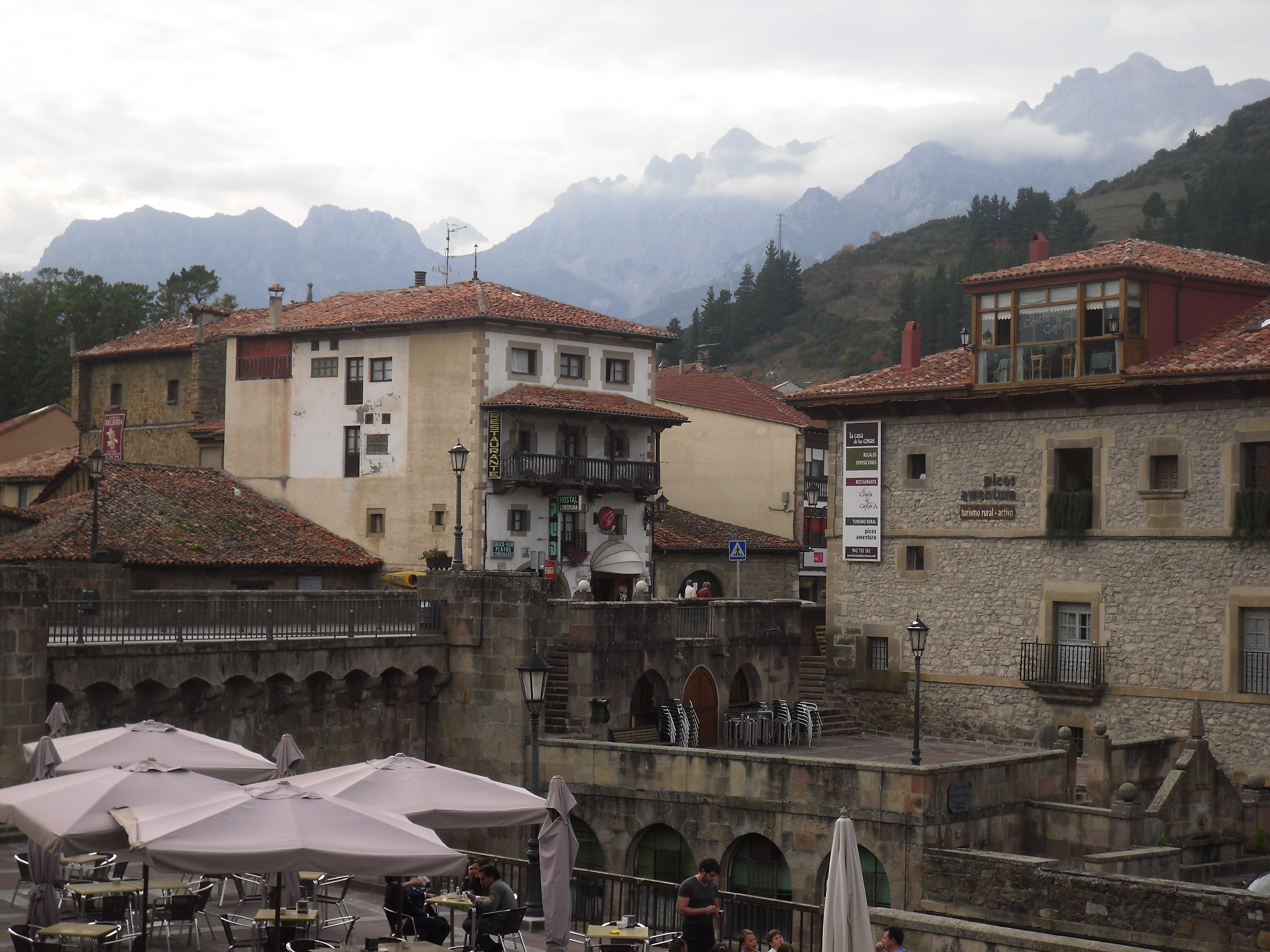

- Flag Coat of arms

- Location of Potes in Cantabria Location of Potes in Spain
- Coordinates: 43°9′13″N 4°37′24″W
- Country: Spain
- Autonomous community: Cantabria
- Province: Cantabria
- Comarca: Liébana
- Judicial district: San Vicente de la Barquera

Government
  - Alcalde: Francisco Javier Gómez Ruiz (2007) (PP)

Area
  - Total: 7.64 km^{2} (2.95 sq mi)
- Elevation: 291 m (955 ft)

Population (2025-01-01)
  - Total: 1,323
  - Density: 173/km^{2} (449/sq mi)
- Demonym: Lebaniego/a
- Time zone: UTC+1 (CET)
  - Summer (DST): UTC+2 (CEST)
- Postal code: 39570
- Official language(s): Spanish
- Website: Official website

Potes is a municipality in the autonomous community of Cantabria in Spain. It is the capital of the Comarca of Liébana and is located in the centre of it. It is bordered to the north by Cillorigo de Liébana, to the west by Camaleño, to the south by Vega de Liébana and to the east by Cabezón de Liébana.

== Geography ==
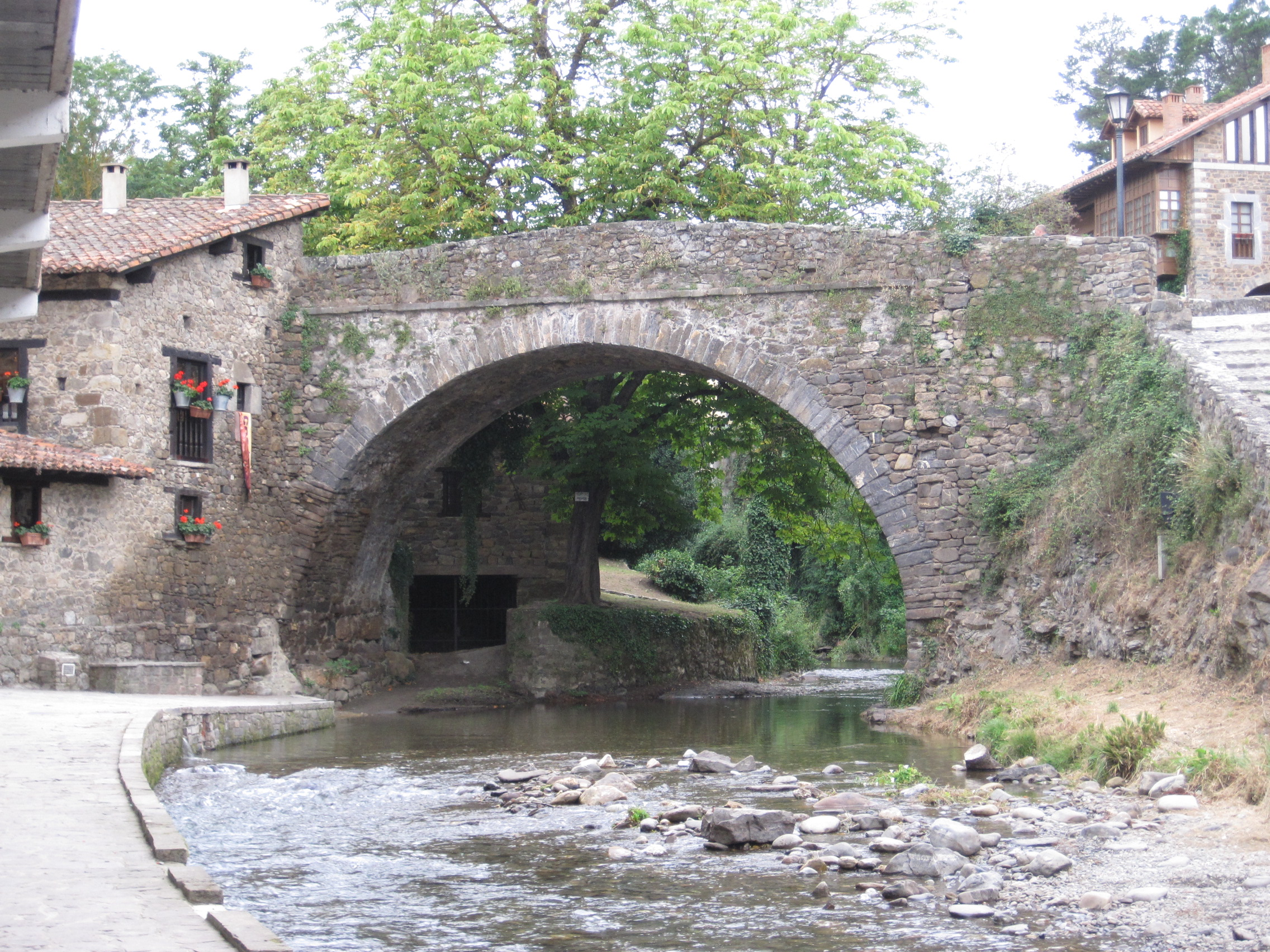
River Quiviesa, through San Cayetano bridge

The town of Potes is located at the confluence of four valleys, near where the River Quiviesa flows in the River Deva, the latter born at altitudes of the Picos de Europa. Like the rest of the Liébana region, Potes enjoys a Mediterranean microclimate that allows the cultivation of the vines, walnut and poplar. Overlooking the town is Arabedes mountain (694m).

== History ==
Potes is located at a strategic point where the two rivers of Liébana meet: the Deva and its tributary the Quiviesa. There is little trace of prehistoric occupation in the region, but the Romans named it Pontes. A village was founded in the 8th century under Alfonso I of Asturias. Potes appeared for the first time in a document written in 847; the document mentions the parish church and the town. Later in the 10th century, Potes became the administrative centre of the Comarca of Liébana. Potes was considered a city from the 13th century and received royal recognition.

In the Becerro de las Behetrías de Castilla manuscript (1351), Potes appears as the property of Tello Alfonso, son of Alfonso XI of Castile. During the late Middle Ages, like all of Liébana, the town was involved in the confrontation between the families of Manrique Castañeda and Mendoza. In 1444, John II of Castile resolved the issue in favour of the Marquis of Santillana. The Marquis made Potes the capital of Liebana, and erected a large tower, called the Torre del Infantado. In this same period, other prominent buildings, such as the nearby Tower of Orejón de la Lama and the San Cayetano bridge were built.

In the modern age, Potes remained a place of manorialism. The Duke of Infantado appointed its mayor. Many villagers emigrated to America and the riches of the new continent allowed the construction of notable buildings in the village. In 1822, Potes received its own town council, being head of a judicial district covering Potes, Castro and Cillorigo, Cabezón de Liébana, Camaleño, Espinama, Pesaguero, Tresviso and Vega de Liébana. Thirty years later, it was incorporated into the judicial district of San Vicente de la Barquera.

During the Spanish Civil War, Potes was hit by a fire caused by the Republican side that destroyed the old town, it was rebuilt afterwards. The old town was classified as a Conjunto Histórico in 1983.

== Economy and infrastructure ==
The main source of income is from tourism due to its location in the Picos de Europa. Potes is on the national road N-621. The nearest major town, Santander, is 100 km away.

== Sites and monuments ==
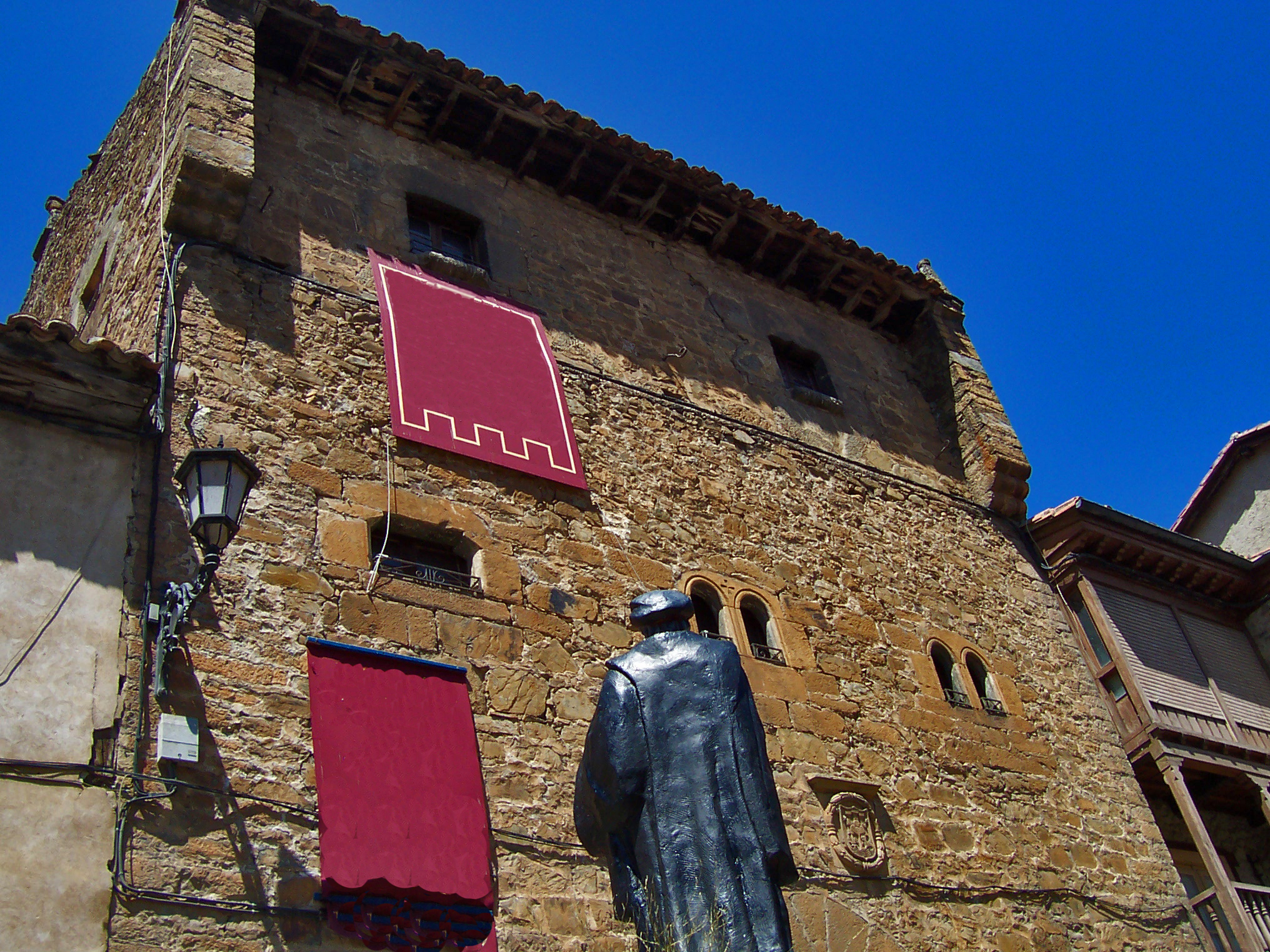
Torre de Orejón de la Lama

- The old town, a historical monument, is a maze of alleys and steps with a medieval atmosphere.
- It is dominated by the Torre del Infantado, a symbol of Potes, built in the 15th century. It has four floors and forms an imposing stone cube, only relieved by turrets. The tower now houses the City Council.
- The old gothic church of San Vicente was built in 15th century and rebuilt from the late 15th century to 17th century, it was replaced in the 19th century by the new parish church of San Vicente. This has 18th-century altarpieces from the Convent of San Raimundo and a sculpture of Saint Vincent, patron saint of the city. In the square is a monument to the violinist Jesús de Monasterio who was a native of Potes.
- The nearby Bridge of San Cayetano overlooks the Rio Quiviesa since the 13th century. At one end is the Ermita de San Cayetano, a chapel which retains its wooden doors and an altarpiece of the 18th century with a portrait of San Cayetano and the Torre de Orejón de la Lama, built from the 15th century to the 17th century and has on its front the shields of Celis and Bedoya. It now serves as a centre for exhibitions and cultural events.
- Other houses, the Casona de la Canal (18th century), the Torre de la Familia Osorio (17th century) and the 18th century San Marcial Street, bears the arms of the family Campillo and birthplace of Jesus Monasterio, dating from the same period.
- The Ermita de la Virgen del Camino is a chapel of the 18th century in the district of la Serna, it has an altarpiece of the same century. The Convent of San Raimundo was built in the early 17th century by the Benedictines. It remains today as the cloister which houses an exhibition on the Picos de Europa and Comarca of Liébana.
- The Ermita de la Virgen de Valmayor, located outside the village, on the road to Vega de Liebana is a chapel built in the 16th century. The altarpiece of the 18th century with the image of the Virgin of Valmayor. This image is carried every 15 August during a procession.

== Demographics ==
Historical population

Year	Pop.	±% p.a.
1900	1,241	—
1910	1,336	+0.74%
1920	1,139	−1.58%
1930	1,208	+0.59%
1940	1,239	+0.25%
1950	1,434	+1.47%
1960	1,364	−0.50%

Year	Pop.	±% p.a.
1970	1,206	−1.22%
1980	1,444	+1.82%
1990	1,475	+0.21%
2001	1,557	+0.49%
2011	1,476	−0.53%
2018	1,350	−1.27%

== Administration ==
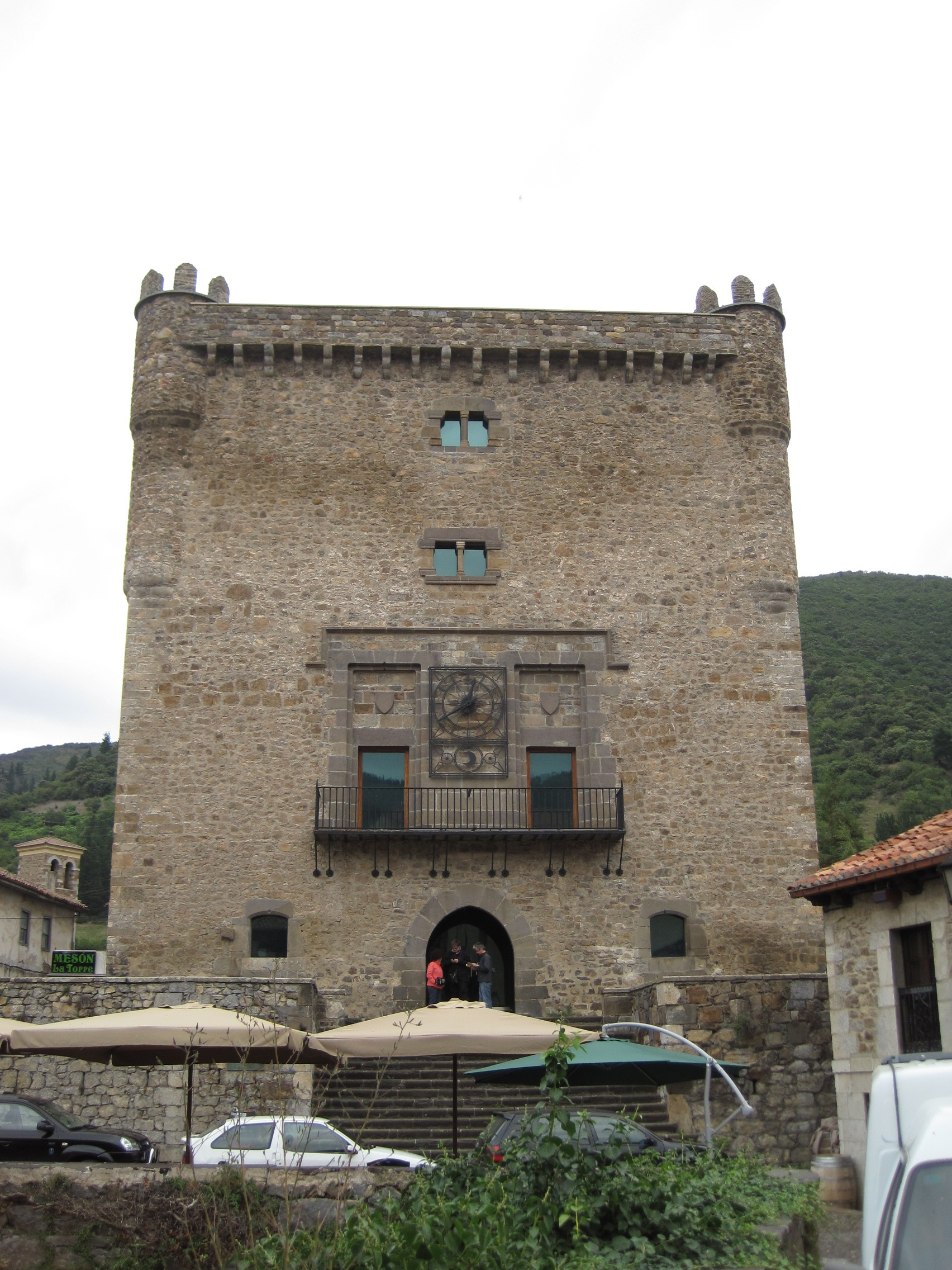
Torre del Infantado

Francisco Javier Gomez Ruiz (PP) is the current mayor of the municipality. The following tables show the results of the elections held in 2003 and 2007.

Municipal elections, 25 May 2003
Party	Votes	%	Councillors
PP	573	54.8%	5
PSOE	234	22.4%	2
PRC	226	21.6%	2

- Alcalde elected: Alfonso Gutiérrez Cuevas (PP)

Municipal elections, 27 May 2007
Party	Votes	%	Councillors
PP	531	54.6%	5
PRC	230	23.6%	2
PSOE	185	19.0%	2

- Alcalde elected: Alfonso Gutiérrez Cuevas (PP) (Died on 17 October 2007, succeeded by Francisco Javier Gómez Ruiz (PP)).

== Cuisine ==
The best known dish from Potes is the chickpea stew Cocido Lebaniego. Other products from Potes, include various cheeses, honey and the grape brandy Orujo that is made from wine grown in the valley.

== Festivals and events ==
Potes has regular religious processions:

- 23 January, the day of the martyr Saint Vincent, patron saint of Potes, and it is the occasion of traditional dances and festivities.
- Early May, the Liébana is host to the procession of Santuca, one of the biggest in Spain. The statue of the Virgen de la Luz leaves the chapel to join Aniezo Santo Toribio de Liebana.
- 15 August, the procession of the Virgen de Valmayor is accompanied by dance, music and songs of the Middle Ages.
- From 13 to 17 September, there is the festival of the Exaltation of the Cross (the Monastery Santo Toribio claims to retain a fragment of the True Cross). This holiday is declared to be of Regional Tourist Interest.

Non-religious, the Feast of the Orujo is also a major event, which takes place in November.
