= Tresviso =

- Municipality
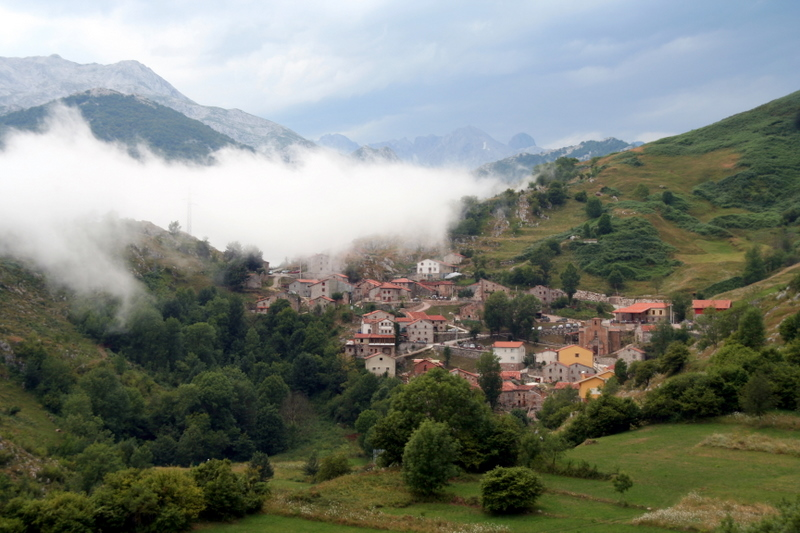
- View of Tresviso from the trail

- Location of Treviso

- Location of Tresviso in Cantabria Location of Tresviso in Spain
- Coordinates: 43°15′30″N 4°40′0″W
- Country: Spain
- Autonomous community: Cantabria
- Province: Cantabria
- Comarca: Liébana
- Judicial district: San Vicente de la Barquera

Government
  - Alcalde: Francisco Javier Campo Campo

Area
  - Total: 16.23 km^{2} (6.27 sq mi)
- Elevation: 907 m (2,976 ft)

Population (2025-01-01)
  - Total: 52
  - Density: 3.2/km^{2} (8.3/sq mi)
- Time zone: UTC+1 (CET)
  - Summer (DST): UTC+2 (CEST)

Tresviso is a municipality located in the autonomous community of Cantabria, Spain. The municipality is located 907 m (2,976 ft) above sea level within the Picos de Europa of the Cantabrian Mountains. The village is located on a mountain ledge approximately 800 m (2,600 ft) above the Deva River valley bottom.

Despite being in Cantabria, the only road access to Tresviso is a narrow road over a 1,320 m (4,330 ft) high pass from Sotres in the neighbouring province of Asturias. Alternatively, on the Cantabrian side there is a strenuous 3-hour hike from the N621 highway along the Deva featuring many switchbacks.
