= Deva (river) =

River in Spain

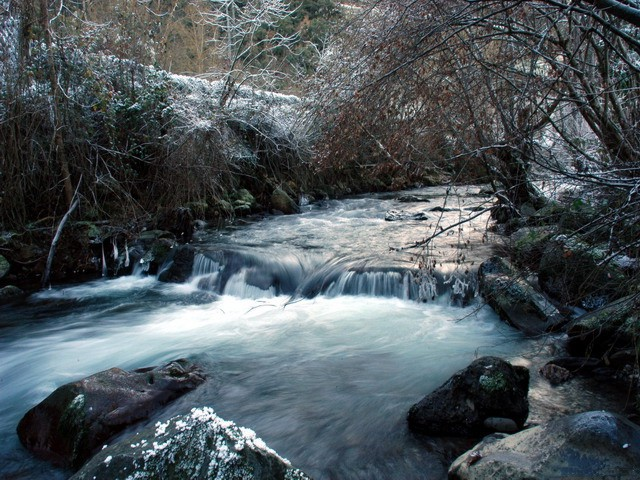
- Deva River in Camaleño

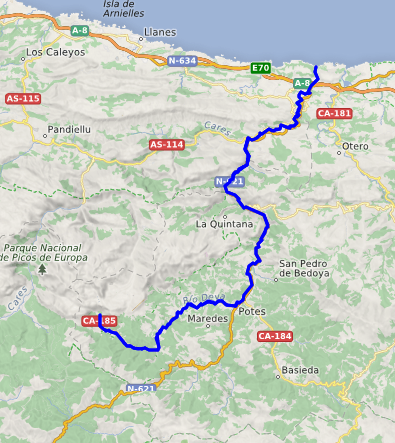
- Course of the Deva

Location
- Country: Spain
- State: Cantabria, Asturias

Physical characteristics
- Source: Cirque
  - location: Fuente Dé, Camaleño
  - elevation: 1,100 m (3,600 ft)
- Mouth: Tina Mayor
  - location: Bay of Biscay
  - elevation: 0 m (0 ft)
- Length: 64 km (40 mi)
- Basin size: 1,195 km^{2} (461 sq mi)
- Discharge
  - location: mouth
  - average: 33.4 m^{3}/s (1,180 cu ft/s)

Basin features
- Tributaries
  - left: Urdón, Cares
  - right: Quiviesa, Bullón

The Deva is a river in Northern Spain, flowing through the Autonomous Communities of Cantabria and Asturias until it flows into Tina Mayor, an estuary. Its main tributaries are the Cares and Urdón rivers, among others.

Deva is the name of a Celtic goddess related to the waters. As the names of the English rivers Dee, which are related, this may come from the Proto-Indo-European *deiueh2-, meaning 'a goddess'. The river is known for being one of the few Spanish watercourses to host native runs of Atlantic salmon.

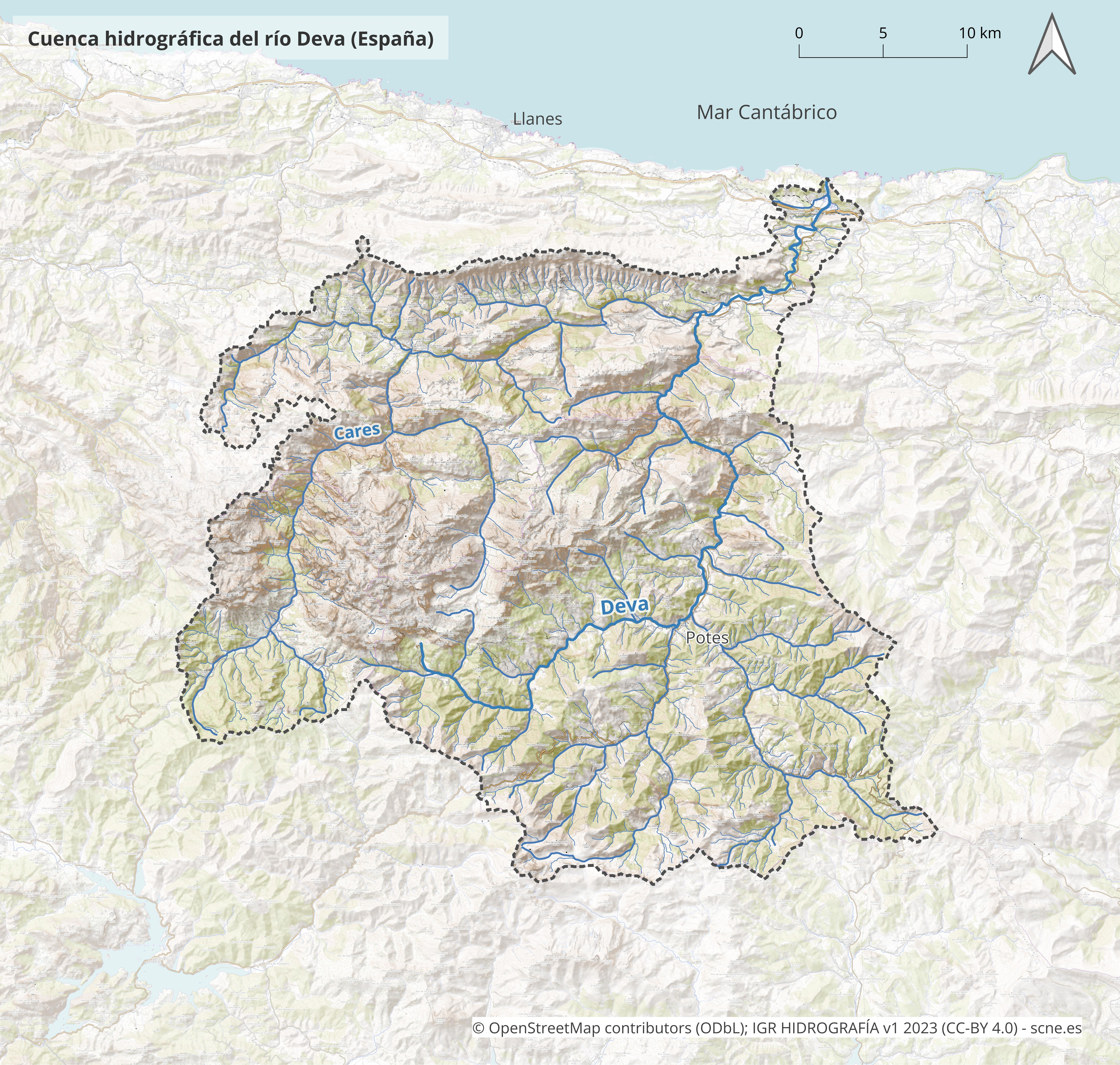
Deva river drainage basin

== See also ==
- List of rivers of Spain
