= Liébana =

Coordinates: 43°09′02″N 4°37′13″W

- Comarca
- Country: Spain
- Autonomous community: Cantabria
- Province: Cantabria
- Capital: Potes
- Municipalities: List: Cabezón de Liébana, Camaleño, Cillorigo de Liébana, Pesaguero, Potes, Tresviso, Vega de Liébana

Area
  - Total: 574.83 km^{2} (221.94 sq mi)

Population (2018)
  - Total: 5,319
  - Density: 9.253/km^{2} (23.97/sq mi)
- Demonym(s): lebaniego, -a
- Time zone: UTC+1 (CET)
  - Summer (DST): UTC+2 (CEST)

Liébana is a comarca (administrative division) of Cantabria, Spain. It covers 575 square kilometres and is located in the far southwest of Cantabria, bordering Asturias, León and Palencia. It is made up of the municipalities of: Cabezón de Liébana, Camaleño, Cillorigo de Liébana, Pesaguero, Potes, Tresviso and Vega de Liébana.

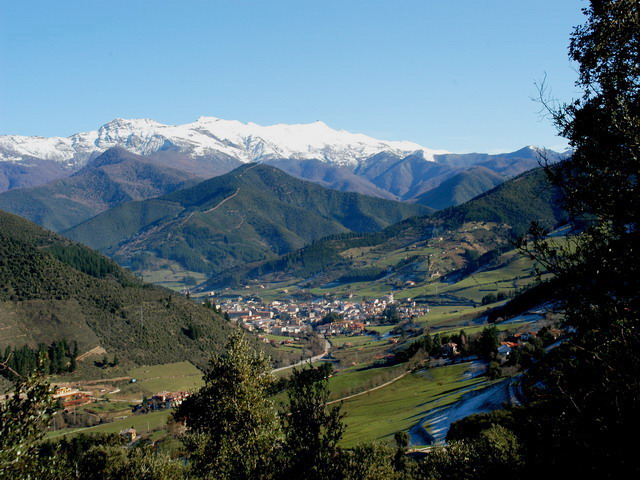
View of the village of Potes, comarcal capital of Liébana

== Geography ==
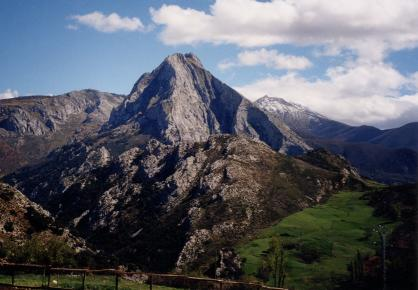
Image of Peña Ventosa in Liébana.

Liébana is a closed mountainous comarca, made up of four valleys (Valdebaró, Cereceda, Valdeprao and Cillorigo) that connect in Potes, the centre of the comarca. Its main rivers are the Deva, the Quiviesa and the Bullón. The steep-sided uplands are formed of Carboniferous limestone affected by karstic processes. Shale and sandstone can be found in the bottom of the valleys.

The considerable depths of the steep-sloped valleys create a great wide variety of environments which allow for a multitude of tree species: European beech, holm oak and cork oak, as well as other oaks such as Quercus robur, Quercus Pyrenaica and Quercus lusitania. These complement the grazing pastures and cultivated crops. The landscape's narrow relief gives it a microclimate different from the rest of the region, affected by an Atlantic climate. So, while the bottom of the Liébana valley enjoys a Mediterranean climate, it shifts progressively to a humid Atlantic climate as the altitude increases, until subalpine conditions are reached in the high peaks of the Picos de Europa. The average annual temperatures are 28°C maximum and 8°C minimum, with a lower precipitation rate than in other Cantabrian zones (800 mm annually versus 1,000 to 1,200 mm of average in the region).

== Municipalities ==
The seven municipalities, with their areas and populations, are set out below:

Name	Area (km^{2})	Population (2001)	Population (2011)	Population (2018)
Cabezón de Liébana	81.4	692	704	592
Camaleño	161.8	1,107	1,029	946
Cillorigo de Liébana	104.5	1,089	1,341	1,337
Pesaguero	70.0	378	341	285
Potes	7.6	1,557	1,476	1,350
Tresviso	16.2	52	73	64
Vega de Liébana	133.2	964	840	745

== Economy ==
The economy of the comarca of Liébana has shifted from the primary sector to the rural tourism boom, thanks to its landscapes and the appeal of the Picos de Europa National Park. Nevertheless, the development brought by tourism has affected the township of Potes, capital of the comarca almost exclusively, to the detriment of the rest of the villages of the valley. Thus, Potes in the late 20th century enjoyed population growth, the other settlements were undergoing a decrease in population. However since 2000 Potes has been declining in population, in line with the rest of the comarca.

== History ==
At the end of the 14th century, King John I of Castile granted the lordship of Liébana to his cousin Don Juan Téllez of Castile, Lord of Aguilar de Campoo and son of the Infante Don Tello of Castile. Towards the second half of the 15th century, the possession of the lordship of Liébana was the cause of one of the frequent peerage wars of that time, and subsequently of a long lawsuit between the heirs of Don Juan Téllez of Castile (the Marquises of Aguilar de Campoo) and the successors of the second marriage of his wife Doña Leonor de la Vega (the Dukes of Infantado). In 1576 the courts passed sentence in favor of the House of Infantado.

Saint Beatus of Liébana (c. 730 – c. 800) settled in the region, where he died. He was a monk, theologian and geographer, remembered as the compiler of the Commentary on the Apocalypse, written in 776, which contains one of the earliest Christian world-maps.

== See also ==
- Santo Toribio de Liébana

== Bibliography ==
- Songbook of Liébana, Matilde Camus 1977
