= Cillorigo de Liébana, Spain =

Cillorigo de Liébana
- Municipality
- Flag Coat of arms

- Location of Cillorigo de Liébana

- Location of Cillorigo de Liébana in Cantabria Location of Cillorigo de Liébana in Spain
- Coordinates: 43°10′42″N 4°35′57″W
- Country: Spain
- Autonomous community: Cantabria
- Province: Cantabria
- Comarca: Liébana
- Judicial district: San Vicente de la Barquera
- Capital: Tama

Government
  - Alcalde: Jesús María Cuevas Monasterio (2007) (PP)

Area
  - Total: 104.52 km^{2} (40.36 sq mi)
- Elevation: 259 m (850 ft)

Population (2025-01-01)
  - Total: 1,386
  - Density: 13.26/km^{2} (34.34/sq mi)
- Time zone: UTC+1 (CET)
  - Summer (DST): UTC+2 (CEST)
- Website: Official website

Cillorigo de Liébana (Spanish pronunciation: [θiʎoˈɾiɣo ðe ˈljeβana]) is a municipality located within the autonomous community of Cantabria, Spain. According to the 2007 census, the city had a population of 1,179 inhabitants. Its capital is Tama.

== Locations ==
Locations	Concejo de Bedoya	Concejo de San Sebastián
Armaño, 28 pop.; Bejes, 72 pop.; Cabañes, 47 pop.; Castro-Cillorigo, 57 pop.; Colio, 63 pop.; Lebeña, 94 pop.; Pendes, 56 pop.; Viñón, 44 pop.	Neighborhood of Cobeña, 14 pop.; Neighborhood of Pumareña, 41 pop.; Neighborhood of Salarzón, 33 pop.; Neighborhood of San Pedro, 22 pop.; Neighborhood of Trillayo, 33 pop.; Place of Esanos, 45 pop.	Neighborhoods of Aliezo, 59 pop.; Neighborhood of Llayo, 2 pop.; Tama (Capital), 64 pop.; Lugar de Ojedo, 441 pop.
