= Pesaguero =

- Municipality
- Flag Coat of arms

- Location of Pesaguero

- Location in Spain
- Coordinates: 43°4′39″N 4°32′22″W
- Country: Spain
- Autonomous community: Cantabria
- Province: Cantabria
- Comarca: Liébana
- Judicial district: San Vicente de la Barquera
- Capital: Pesaguero

Government
  - Alcalde: Vicente Vélez Caloca

Area
  - Total: 70 km^{2} (27 sq mi)
- Elevation: 614 m (2,014 ft)

Population (2025-01-01)
  - Total: 275
  - Density: 3.9/km^{2} (10/sq mi)
- Time zone: UTC+1 (CET)
  - Summer (DST): UTC+2 (CEST)

Pesaguero is a municipality located in the autonomous community of Cantabria, Spain.

== Localities ==
Its 360 inhabitants (INE, 2006) live in:

- Avellanedo, 18 hab.
- Barreda, 38 hab.
- Caloca, 56 hab.
- Cueva, 25 hab.
- Lerones, 40 hab.
- Lomeña, 48 hab.
- Obargo, 12 hab.
- Pesaguero (Capital), 50 hab.
- Valdeprado, 41 hab.
- Vendejo, 32 hab.
- La Parte, 20 habitantes.
