= Vega de Liébana =

- Municipality
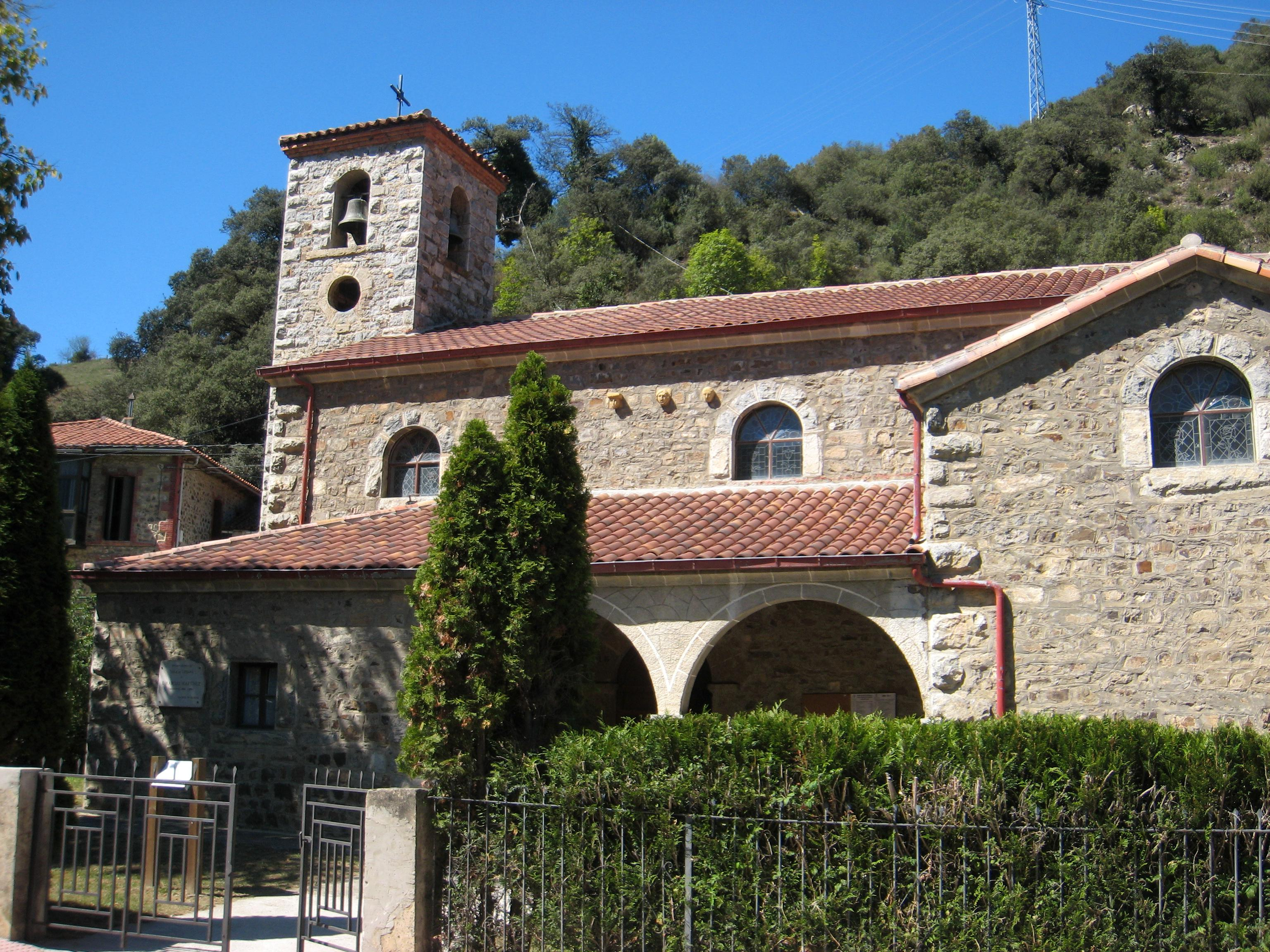
- Church in La Vega

- Flag Coat of arms

- Location of Vega de Liébana in Cantabria

- Location in Spain
- Coordinates: 43°5′58″N 4°38′44″W
- Country: Spain
- Autonomous community: Cantabria
- Province: Cantabria
- Comarca: Liébana
- Capital: La Vega

Area
  - Total: 133.21 km^{2} (51.43 sq mi)
- Elevation: 467 m (1,532 ft)

Population (2025-01-01)
  - Total: 676
  - Density: 5.07/km^{2} (13.1/sq mi)
- Time zone: UTC+1 (CET)
  - Summer (DST): UTC+2 (CEST)
- Official language(s): Spanish

Vega de Liébana is a municipality in the province and autonomous community of Cantabria, northern Spain.

== See also ==
- Pico Jano

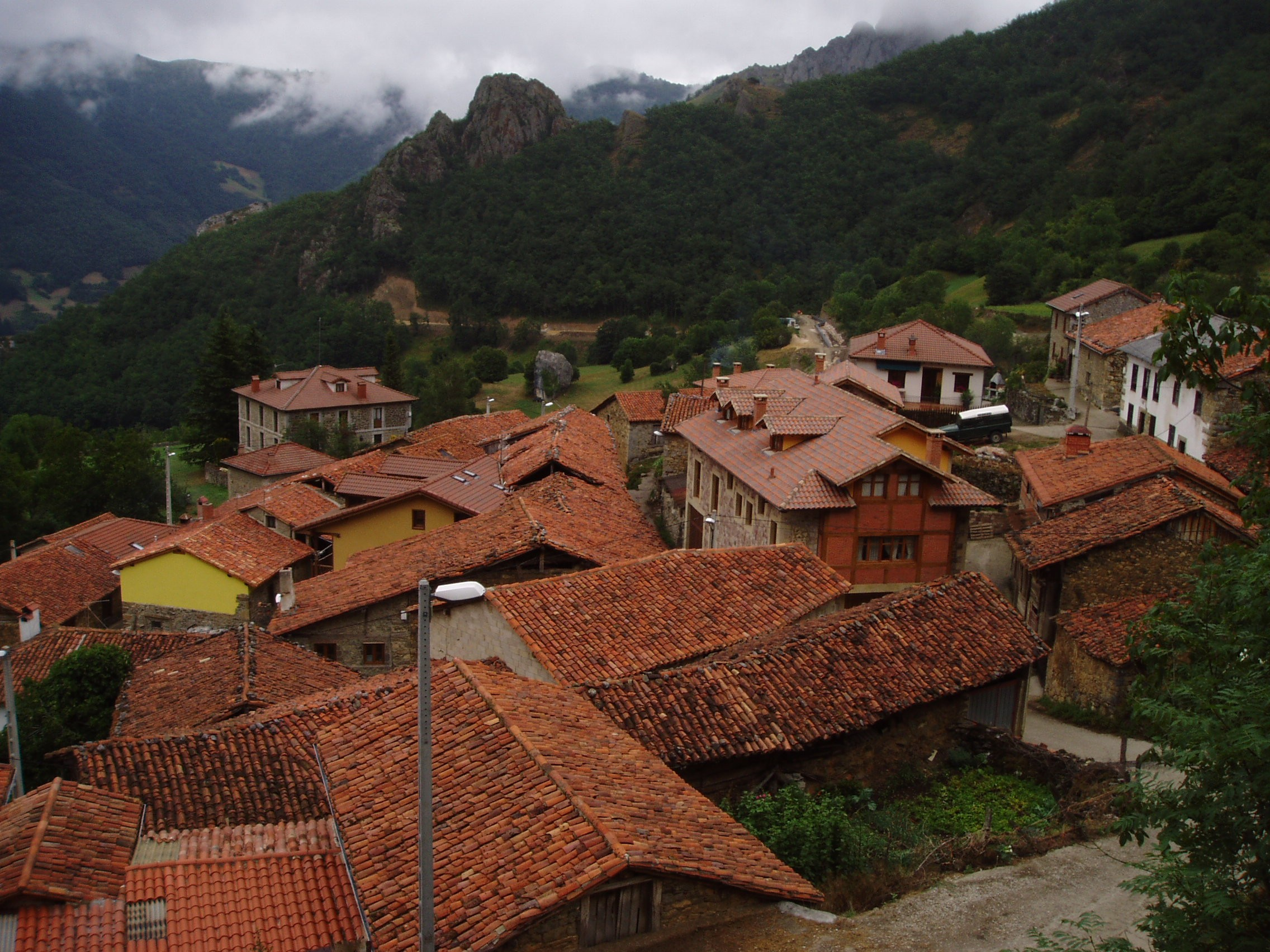
Cucayo
