= Camaleño =

- Municipality
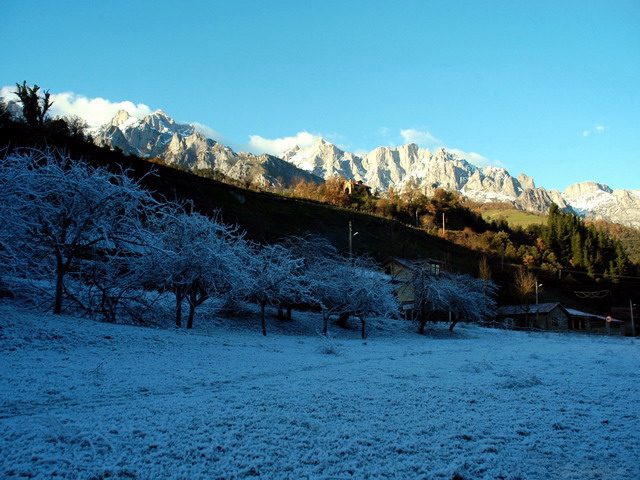

- Flag Coat of arms

- Location of Camaleño

- Location within Cantabria Camaleño (Spain)
- Coordinates: 43°9′7″N 4°41′32″W
- Country: Spain
- Autonomous community: Cantabria
- Province: Cantabria
- Comarca: Liébana
- Judicial district: San Vicente de la Barquera
- Capital: Camaleño

Government
  - Alcalde: Óscar Casares Alonso (2015) (PRC)

Area
  - Total: 161.1 km^{2} (62.2 sq mi)
- Elevation: 400 m (1,300 ft)

Population (2025-01-01)
  - Total: 964
  - Density: 5.98/km^{2} (15.5/sq mi)
- Time zone: UTC+1 (CET)
  - Summer (DST): UTC+2 (CEST)
- Website: Official website

Camaleño is a municipality located in the autonomous community of Cantabria, Spain. According to the 2007 census, the city had 1,096 inhabitants.

== History ==
According to the chronicle of Alfonso III of Leon, the surviving Arabs of the Battle of Covadonga (722) succumbed in Cosgaya, a village belonging to Camaleño under an avalanche of stones. In this valley the second Asturian king Favila of Asturias died 739, killed by a bear. At that time there was already a monastery in Turieno, dedicated to San Martín, where a large reliquary of the Cross of Christ and the body of Santo Toribio, who apparently brought it from Palestine, was kept. Over the years, it became a center of pilgrimage, with the privilege of recognition by different popes. The monastery came under the Oña in the twelfth century, and the process of seigneurization subjected the valley to the jurisdiction of the Marquises of Santillana and Duke of Infantado.

Camaleño belonged to the judicial district of Potes until the late 1970s, then it became part of San Vicente de la Barquera.

== See also ==
- Pico Jano
