= Rodrigo Muñoz de Guzmán =

Castilian magnate

- Lord of Guzman
- Died: c. 1186
- Buried: Monastery of San Cristobal in San Millán de Juarros
- Noble family: House of Guzmán
- Spouse: Mayor Díaz
- Father: Munio or Nuño

Rodrigo Muñoz de Guzmán or Rodrigo Núñez de Guzmán (died ca. 1186), considered the common ancestor of the noble house of Guzmán, was a Castilian magnate and tenente of Roa and of the village of Guzmán in Burgos, from which this lineage took its name.

== Life ==
Nothing is known about the parentage or ancestry of Rodrigo Muñoz de Guzmán. The onomastic customs of that time dictate that, given his patronymic Muñoz, he must have been the son of a Munio (Muño) or Nuño. (Note: According to the Spanish genealogist Luis de Salazar y Castro, Rodrigo was the son of Álvar Núñez de Guzmán and Elvira de Manzanedo, "ignoring the most basic usage of patronymics during the 10th, 11th, and 12th centuries". The historian Gonzalo Martínez Diez dismisses this filiation as pure fiction and concludes that there is no documentary evidence enabling the identification of the Munio (Muño) or Nuño who would have been the father of Rodrigo.) He was a patron of several monasteries, including the Monastery of San Cosme and San Damián in Covarrubias and of the Monastery of San Cristóbal de Ibeas situated in San Millán de Juarros which had been founded by Álvaro Díaz de Oca and his wife Teresa Ordóñez, the maternal grandparents of his wife Mayor. Rodrigo and Mayor were buried there. On 20 February 1151, Gutierre Fernández de Castro with his wife Toda, and Rodrigo and his wife Mayor, Toda's sister, donated several properties that the sisters had inherited from their maternal grandparents, to the abbot of the monastery.

Rodrigo Muñoz probably died shortly after 29 January 1186, the date when he last appears in medieval charters.

== Marriage and issue ==
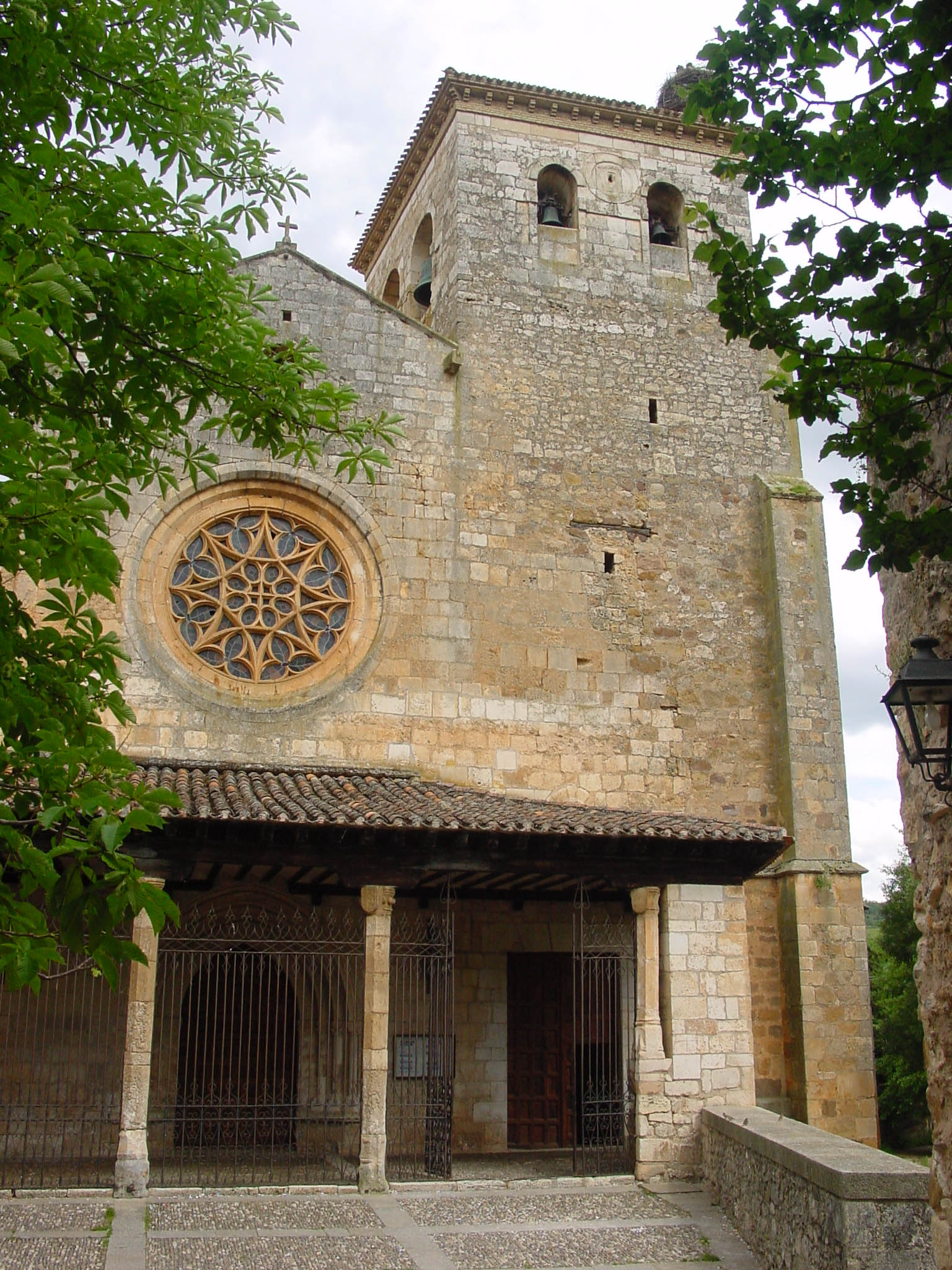
Atrium and tower of the Colegiata de San Cosme y San Damián de Covarrubias

He married before 1150 Mayor Díaz, daughter of Diego Sánchez, who died in the Battle of Uclés, and of Enderquina Álvarez, daughter of Álvaro Díaz de Oca and his wife Teresa Ordóñez. At least nine children were born of this marriage:

- Álvaro Rodríguez de Guzmán (died in 1187), governed, as tenant-in-chief, Mansilla, a toponymic which he adopted as his cognomen and as such he appears confirming several charters as Álvaro Rodríguez de Mansilla. He also governed La Pernía and Liébana. (Note: He appears frequently with his siblings. In 1170 appears with his brothers Pedro and Fernando confirming the treaty of Zaragoza: "... Albaro rodriz de massiella, Petrus rodriz et ferrandus rodriz eius fratres".) (Note: In another document dated 1167, he mentions his brothers and sisters: Pero, Fernando, Rodrigo, Urraca, Sancha and Teresa.) Álvaro married Sancha Rodríguez de Castro, daughter of Rodrigo Fernández de Castro, the Bald and Eylo Álvarez with whom he had Fernando and Eylo Álvarez, as well as Elvira and Toda Álvarez de Guzmán, the latter married to Álvaro Rodríguez Girón, son of Rodrigo Gutiérrez Girón.
- Fernando Rodríguez de Guzmán, who, according to genealogist Luis de Salazar y Castro, was the husband of Juana de Aza and father of Saint Dominic, although there is no documentary proof whatsoever sustaining this filiation. (Note: "We know nothing about the marriage or descendants of Fernando Rodríguez de Guzmán. Because of this lack of documentation and the fact that there was no record of any Félix de Guzmán, the supposed father of Saint Dominic, Salazar y Castro proposed the hypothesis, totally unfounded, that this Fernando was the father of Saint Dominic of Caleruega (...) We have checked several branches of the Aza and Guzmán lineages without having found Juana de Aza (supposed mother of the saint) or any Félix of Guzmán" (loose translation))
- Nuño or Munio Rodríguez de Guzmán, who probably died young, shortly after August 1151 when he last appears confirming a donation made by King Sancho III of Castile.
- Pedro Rodríguez de Guzmán (died on 18 July 1195 at the Battle of Alarcos). Appointed Mayordomo mayor of King Alfonso VIII in April 1194. Around May 1174 he married Mahalda, as confirmed in the donation made by King Alfonso VIII in casamento (as a wedding gift). (Note: In old genealogical treatises, Pedro's wife is said to be a member of the Manzanedo family although this filiation is not confirmed in medieval charters. Jaime de Salazar y Acha suggests that she could have been an illegitimate daughter of William VIII of Montpellier and, therefore, half-sister of Maria of Montpellier, the mother of King James I of Aragon Sánchez de Mora proposes that Mahalda could have been the daughter of Manrique Perez de Lara, although she does not appear with her supposed parents or siblings in any document.) The couple had several children, including Nuño Pérez de Guzmán who was the head of the house of Guzmán, and Guillén Pérez de Guzmán, the father of Mayor Guillén de Guzmán, mistress of King Alfonso X of Castile, the parents of Beatrice of Castile, queen consort of Portugal due to her marriage to King Afonso.
- Rodrigo Rodríguez de Guzmán, mentioned by his brother Álvaro in 1167.
- Urraca Rodríguez de Guzmán (died after 1189), who married Pedro Rodríguez de Castro. Both appear together in 1189 when they donated Villasila and Villamelendro to the Order of Santiago, confirming as ego Petrus Roderici de Castro cum uxore mea Urraca Roderici (I, Pedro Rodríguez de Castro with my wife Urraca Rodríguez)
- Sancha Rodríguez de Guzmán, mentioned by her brother Álvaro in 1167.
- María de Guzmán, was the first wife of Rodrigo Gutiérrez Girón.
- Teresa Rodríguez de Guzmán, also mentioned by her brother Álvaro in 1167.

== Bibliography ==
- Martínez Diez, Gonzalo (1975). "San Cristóbal de Ibeas". Boletín de la Institución Fernán González (in Spanish). No. 185. Burgos: Institución Fernán González. pp. 689–720. hdl:10259.4/1729. ISSN 0211-8998.
- Martínez Diez, Gonzalo (1994). "Orígenes familiares de Santo Domingo, los linajes de Aza y Guzmán". Santo Domingo de Caleruega en su contexto socio-político, 1170-1221 (in Spanish). Salamanca: San Esteban. pp. 173–228. ISBN 978-84-87557-77-4.
- Salazar y Acha, Jaime de (1991). "El linaje castellano de Castro en el siglo XII: Consideraciones e hipótesis sobre su origen". Anales de la Real Academia Matritense de Heráldica. No. 1. pp. 33–68. ISSN 1133-1240.
- Salazar y Acha, Jaime de; Masnata y de Quesada, David (1990). "Precisiones y nuevos datos sobre el entorno familiar de Alfonso X el Sabio fundador de Ciudad Real" (PDF). Cuadernos de Estudios Manchegos (in Spanish) (20). Instituto de Estudios Manchegos: 210–231. ISSN 0526-2623. Archived from the original (PDF) on 2014-01-30.
- Sánchez de Mora, Antonio (2003). La nobleza castellana en la plena Edad Media: el linaje de Lara. Doctoral thesis (in Spanish). Universidad de Sevilla. ISBN 8468973076.
- Torres Sevilla-Quiñones de León, Margarita Cecilia (1999). Linajes nobiliarios en León y Castilla siglos IX-XIII (in Spanish). Consejería de Educación y Cultura de Castilla y León. ISBN 84-7846-781-5.
