= Rodrigo Fernández =

Rodrigo Fernández may refer to:

- Rodrigo Fernández (rugby union), Chilean rugby union player
- Rodrigo Fernández (footballer) (born 1996), Uruguayan footballer
- Rodrigo Fernández de Castro, Castilian nobleman and soldier
- Rodrigo Fernandez-Stoll, Canadian actor and comedian
