= Pedro Rodríguez de Castro =

Castilian nobleman

- Mayordomo mayor de León
- Died: c. 1189
- Noble family: Castro
- Spouse: Urraca Rodríguez de Castro
- Father: Rodrigo Fernández de Castro el Calvo
- Mother: Eylo Álvarez

Pedro Rodríguez de Castro (fl. 1171–1191), second son of Rodrigo Fernández de Castro the bald and Eylo Álvarez, daughter of Álvar Fáñez, and of the Countess Mayor Perez, was a Castilian nobleman of the lineage of the Castro. Just like his great-grandfather, count Pedro Ansúrez, he was Butler of Leon in 1184 and tenente of Grado, Tineo, Pravia, and Limia. The Count of Barcelos in his Nobiliario, and Argote de Molina in his nobility of Andalusia, called him "the monk" as he entered religion after becoming a widower.

He was married before 1171 to Urraca Guzmán Rodríguez, daughter of Rodrigo Muñoz de Guzmán and Mayor Díaz, who possibly had no offspring.

On 19 December 1187, king Alfonso VIII of Castile, in thanks for joining the services of the Castilian Crown, donated to him the villas of Villasila and Villamelendro. (Note: Manuscripts in the Library of the Hispanic Society of America. 1928, p. 1, Chapter 1:" Alfonso, tenth King of Castile, in Aguilar del Campo confirmed on 8 March, was 1293 (A.D. 1255) a privilege of his great-grandfather King Alfonso, eighth King of Castile Arévalo dated December 19 era 1225 (1187 A.D.) in favour of Pedro Rodríguez de Castro»«, in which donate you the places called Villa Sillo and Villa Melendo.»")

Pedro Rodríguez de Castro died after 22 November 1191, date of its last appearance in medieval documentation.

== Sources ==
- González, Julio (1960). El reino de Castilla en la época de Alfonso VIII. Madrid: CSIC, Escuela de Estudios Medievales. OCLC 3122548.
- Salazar y Acha, Jaime de (1991). "El linaje castellano de Castro en el siglo XII: Consideraciones e hipótesis sobre su origen". Anales de la Real Academia Matritense de Heráldica. No. 1. pp. 33–68. ISSN 1133-1240.
- Salcedo Tapia, Modesto (1992). "Noticias y documentos de Itero de la Vega". Publicaciones de la Institución Tello Téllez de Meneses. Palencia: Instituto Tello Téllez de Meneses. pp. 495–612. ISSN 0210-7317.
- Torres Sevilla-Quiñones de León, Margarita Cecilia (1999). Linajes nobiliarios de León y Castilla: Siglos IX-XIII. Salamanca: Junta de Castilla y León, Consejería de educación y cultura. ISBN 84-7846-781-5.
