= Rodrigo Fernández de Castro =

Castilian nobleman

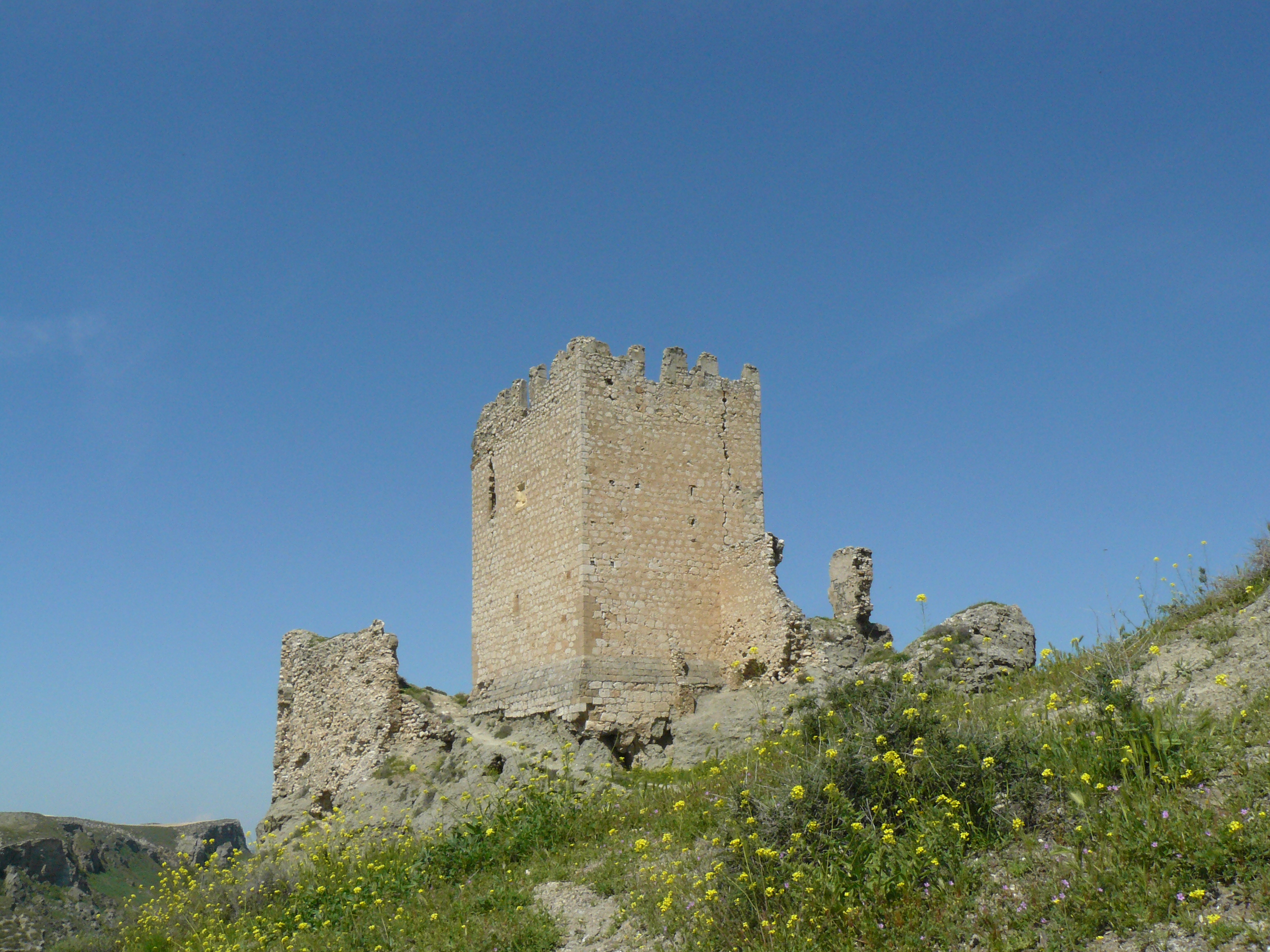
The castle of Oreja, which Rodrigo and his brother besieged in 1139

Rodrigo Fernández de Castro (died after 1144), called the Bald (el Calvo), was a Castilian nobleman and soldier. One of the founders of the House of Castro, he was the second son of Fernando García de Hita and Tegridia (or Trigidia), sister or aunt of Count Rodrigo Martínez and relative of the Ansúrez family. His paternal grandfather may have been García Ordóñez, who died at the battle of Uclés in 1108.

== Military career ==
In April 1126 Rodrigo and his elder brother Gutierre made submission to the new king (later emperor), Alfonso VII, along with the rest of the Castilian nobility. Rodrigo served as the king's alférez the summer of 1130 until spring the next year. (His predecessor—Pedro Alfonso—is last recorded on 10 June 1130 and he was in office by 26 August, while the last record of him there is dated 15 May 1131 and his successor—Pedro Garcés—was in place by 29 May.) In June and July 1137 he and Gutierre participated in the royal expedition to Galicia, where Tuy was reconquered from the Portuguese and they visited Santiago de Compostela. Rodrigo subscribed royal charters of 26–27 June at Tuy and 17 July and 29 July at Santiago. In October he rejoined the royal court as it travelled through Castile. On 9 October he subscribed a royal charter at Burgos, on the 20th the court was on the Ebro and on 29 October they were at Nájera. Most of Rodrigo's subsequent military career took place on the southern frontier, in the Reconquista against the Almoravids.

In 1137 Rodrigo succeeded Count Rodrigo González de Lara as governor (alcaide) of Toledo. Shortly after this he raided the environs of Córdoba and defeated an army under Tashfin ibn Ali, the future sultan, at a place called Almont (perhaps Almonacid) on his return. According to the Chronicle of Emperor Alfonso, "the military experiences of Rodrigo González and Rodrigo Fernández against the Moors were indeed great, but they have not been described in this book." In 1138 Rodrigo Fernández joined King Alfonso and Count Rodrigo Martínez in a plundering expedition along the river Guadalquivir, which brought back a host of slaves. He was present at the unsuccessful siege of Coria in July, where Rodrigo Martínez was killed in action. In April 1139 Rodrigo and his brother were ordered to besiege Oreja with their own knights assisted by the local cavalry and infantry units of the frontier towns. By 25 July the king had taken command of the siege, which he brought to a successful conclusion in October. Rodrigo was probably present with the royal court throughout, following Alfonso on detours to Toledo on 14 August and 26 October. In 1142, according to the Anales toledanos, he raided a town called Silvia in the Algarve and brought back 10,000 captives.

On 22 February 1140 Rodrigo and Gutierre were at Carrión de los Condes to witness the treaty between Alfonso VII and Count Raymond Berengar IV of Barcelona. In 1142 he was the royal tenente holding the town of Ávila in fief from the crown. He is last recorded at court in 1144 and disappears from the record after that. He was dead by 1148, when his widow married Count Ramiro Fróilaz.

== Marriage and children ==
According to the 14th-century genealogist Pedro de Barcelos, Rodrigo had a daughter, Aldonza Ruiz de Castro, who married Lope Díaz de Haro. According to the modern genealogist Luis de Salazar y Castro, Aldonza was the daughter of Rodrigo and Elo Martínez Osorio. These genealogies are false. Rodrigo's wife was Elo (also spelled Eilo or Eylo) Álvarez, daughter of Álvar Fáñez, and he had no daughter named Aldonza, according to near-contemporary historian Rodrigo Jiménez de Rada. Rodrigo and Elo had at least five sons and one daughter. The eldest son, Fernando, "the Castilian", became the leader of the House of Castro after the death of his uncle Gutierre.

Two of Rodrigo's children married children of Rodrigo Muñoz de Guzmán. His daughter Sancha married Álvaro Rodríguez de Guzmán, tenente of Mansilla, and his son Pedro married Urraca Rodríguez de Guzmán. A third son, Álvaro, became the majordomo of King Ferdinand II of León. A younger son, Gutierre el Escalabrado ("the head-wounded"), married Elvira Osorio.

== Sources ==
- Barton, Simon F. (1997). The Aristocracy in Twelfth-century León and Castile. Cambridge: Cambridge University Press.
- Canal Sánchez-Pagín, José María (1995). "La Casa de Haro en León y Castilla durante el siglo XII: Nuevas conclusiones". Anuario de Estudios Medievales. 25 (1): 3–38. doi:10.3989/aem.1995.v25.i1.920.
- Canal Sánchez-Pagín, José María (1997). "El conde García Ordóñez, rival del Cid Campeador: Su familia, sus servicios a Alfonso VI". Anuario de Estudios Medievales. 27 (2): 749–73. doi:10.3989/aem.1997.v27.i2.623.
- Gautier Dalché, Jean (1991). "En Castille pendant la première moitié du XIIe siècle: les combattants des villes d'entre Duero et Tage". Actes des congrès de la Société des historiens médiévistes de l'enseignement supérieur public (18^{e} congrès, Montpellier, 1987: Le combattant au Moyen Age). 18: 199–211.
- Martínez Sopena, Pascual (1990). "El conde Rodrigo de León y los suyos: herencia y expectativa del poder entre los siglos X y XII". In Pastor de Togneri, Reyna (ed.). Relaciones de Poder, de Produccion y Parentesco en la Edad Media y Moderna. Madrid: Consejo Superior de Investigaciones Científicas. pp. 5–84.
- Salazar y Acha, Jaime de (1991). "El linaje castellano de Castro en el siglo XII: Consideraciones e hipótesis sobre su origen". Anales de la Real Academia Matritense de Heráldica. 1: 33–68.
- Salazar y Acha, Jaime de (1985). Una Familia de la Alta Edad Media: Los Velas y su Realidad Histórica». Estudios Genealógicos y Heráldicos. Asociación Española de Estudios Genealógicos y Heráldicos. ISBN 84-398-3591-4.
- Torres Sevilla-Quiñones de León, Margarita Cecilia (1999). Linajes nobiliarios de León y Castilla: Siglos IX-XIII. Salamanca: Junta de Castilla y León, Consejería de educación y cultura. ISBN 84-7846-781-5.
