= House of Guzmán =

Spanish noble family from Castile

Arms of the House of Guzmán

The House of Guzmán (Casa de Guzmán) is an old and noble Spanish family that emerged in Castile in the 12th century and became one of the most prominent dynasties of the Spanish kingdom until the 18th century. The original family gave rise to several branches, one of which became Dukes of Medina Sidonia from the 15th century to the 18th century, in turn giving rise to other branches including the Count-Dukes of Olivares.

== Origin ==
The founder of what became the House of Guzmán was a Castilian nobleman named Rodrigo Muñoz de Guzmán, who is first seen in the mid 12th-century as tenente (Lord) of Roa and lord of the village of Guzmán in Burgos. The family would come to be known by a toponymic surname indicating their derivation from the latter village. Rodrigo last appears in January 1186. By the 15th century, as related by Fernán Pérez de Guzmán in his Generaciones y Semblanzas, the family had developed multiple origin traditions. One of these traced the family from a certain Count Ramiro, who had taken as wife or lover the daughter of a King of León. A second legend indicated that among those from diverse nations taking part in the Reconquest was a brother of the Duke of Brittany, named Gudeman (meaning 'good man'). The legend, as related by Fernán Pérez de Guzmán, tells that Gudeman remained south of the Pyrenees, married into the lineage of Count Ramiro, and the family derived their name from him, in the derivative form of Guzmán. Fernán Pérez de Guzmán dismisses this unsupported legend, saying that there are no records of the tale, save for the memories of men. All that is known about the authentic ancestry of founder Rodrigo Muñoz is found in his patronymic and toponymic, indicating his father was named Munio (or perhaps Nuño) and he was from Guzmán. Early historians would make Ramiro Muñoz the grandfather of Saint Dominic, but modern genealogical research finds no evidence for such a connection.

One of Rodrigo's sons, Pedro Rodríguez de Guzmán was killed fighting for king Alfonso VIII of Castile at the Battle of Alarcos in 1195. Pedro's son, Guillén Pérez de Guzmán, would fight for the same king at Las Navas de Tolosa in 1212, and was father of Mayor Guillén de Guzmán, one of the mistresses of king Alfonso X of Castile and by him mother of Beatrice of Castile (1242–1303), queen of Portugal.

== Rise to prominence ==
Coat of arms of the Duke of Medina Sidonia

The family rose to greater prominence under the leadership of Alonso Pérez de Guzmán (1256–1309), otherwise known as Guzmán el Bueno (Guzmán the Good), nobleman and soldier under Sancho IV of Castile. In 1282, that king's father, Alfonso X, had rewarded Guzmán's services with the town of Alcalá Sidonia, today Alcalá de los Gazules, who would exchange him that same year for the Donadío de Monteagudo (now a farmhouse in the municipality of Sanlúcar de Barrameda). In addition, the king married him to María Alfonso Coronel, a rich woman who would contribute to the marriage a very important dowry, composed of houses in the collation (feligresía) of San Miguel in Seville, olive groves of Torrijos (now a hacienda in Valencina de la Concepción), Olive groves of La Robaína (in Pilas), the town of Bollullos de la Mitación, the aceñas (flour mills) that were in the Guadalete river next to Jerez de la Frontera, the payment of La Ina vineyard (now a rural neighborhood in Jerez de la Frontera) and the vineyard payment of El Barroso (now a farmhouse in Jerez de la Frontera).

The Guzmán lineage continued throughout the Middle Ages in the reconquest of the southern peninsula against the Arabs and was established as a noble house of first rank, achieving its climax with the conquest of Granada, playing a leading role in the Castilian politics. This line of Guzman, like others of the Civil War of the mid-fourteenth century, within the one hundred year war, continued through the male line to change the surname for female line in the family inheritance until 1779 in the main title with that of the Álvarez de Toledo lineage.

Several current Spanish noble families derive from the House of Guzman: the House of Duke of Medina-Sidonia, as direct heirs of Beatriz Castilla, and its small Ducal House of Fernandina. From the House of Medina Sidonia (Dukes since 1440) come the lesser noble houses of the Marquesados de Cazaza (in the House of Guzmán since 1504) and Gibraltar (created in 1390 for Enrique de Guzmán, son of the Count of Niebla) from which there were and there are many gentlemen in the Cádiz region.

== Bibliography ==
- Victoria, Pedro López Ayala, ed. (1996). El libro de Oro de los reyes (in Spanish).
- Pensador, Ruth Escolar, ed. (2000). El libro de oro de los duques (in Spanish).
- E. Michael Gerli; Samuel G. Armistead, eds. (2003). Medieval Iberia: An Encyclopedia. Taylor and Francis.
- Michael Maclagan; Jiri Louda, eds. (1981). Lines of Succession. MacDonald & Co.
- Alonso de Haro, ed. (1993). Libro de oro de los linajes ducales y nobiliarios del reino de Castilla (in Spanish).
- Martín Prieto, Pablo. "La fundación del monasterio de Santa Clara de Alcocer (1252-1260)". Hispania Sacra (in Spanish). LVII (115 (January–June 2005)). Madrid: 227–241. OCLC 844065330. Archived from the original on 13 November 2013.
- Salazar y Acha, Jaime de; Masnata y de Quesada, David (1990). "Precisiones y nuevos datos sobre el entorno familiar de Alfonso X el Sabio fundador de Ciudad Real" (PDF). Cuadernos de Estudios Manchegos (in Spanish) (20). Instituto de Estudios Manchegos: 210–231. ISSN 0526-2623.
- Sánchez de Mora, Antonio (2003). "La nobleza castellana en la plena Edad Media: el linaje de Lara". Tesis doctoral (in Spanish). Universidad de Sevilla.
