= Villamelendro de Valdavia =

Villamelendro de Valdavia, Spain
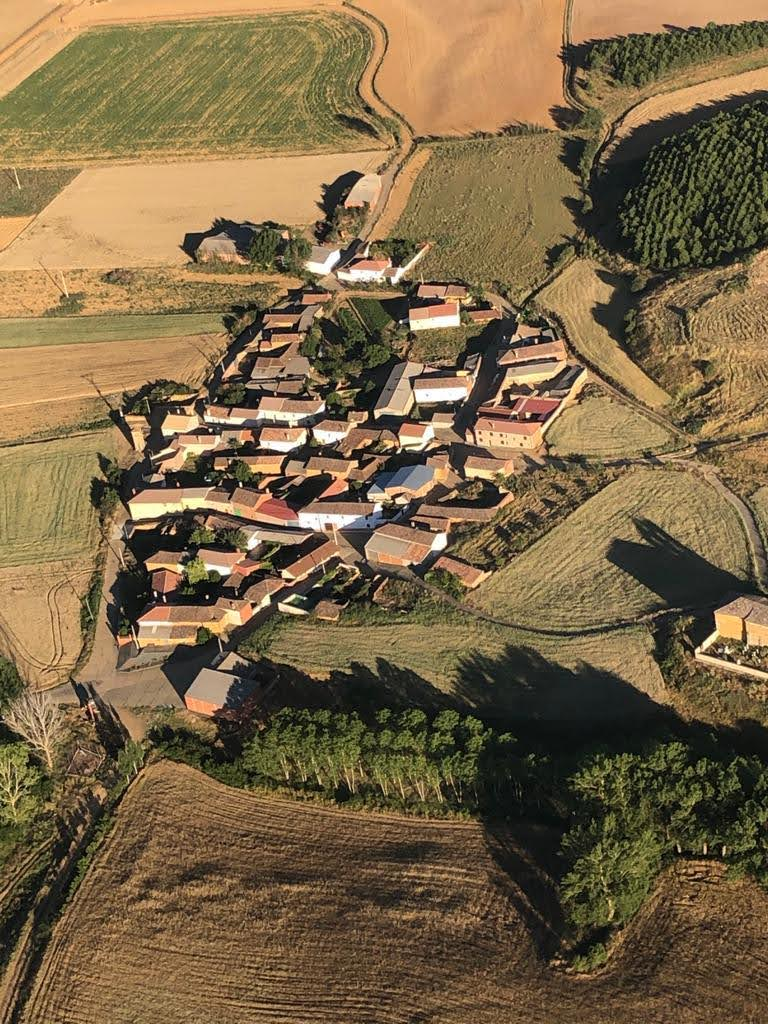

- Flag Seal
- Interactive map of Villamelendro de Valdavia, Spain
- Coordinates: 42°32′15″N 04°34′22″W
- Country: Spain
- Autonomous community: Castile and León
- Province: Palencia
- Municipality: Villasila de Valdavia

Government
  - alcalde: César Sánchez Fernández (PP)

Area
  - Total: 30.25 km^{2} (11.68 sq mi)
- Elevation: 880 m (2,890 ft)

Population (2011)
  - Total: 12
- Time zone: UTC+1 (CET)
  - Summer (DST): UTC+2 (CEST)
- Website: www.villamelendro.es

Villamelendro is a town belonging to the municipality of Villasila de Valdavia, in the region of Vega-Valdavia. It is located in the transition area between the Natural Park Montaña Palentina and the Tierra de Campos in the province Spain of Palencia (Castilla y León), on the upper side of the Triangle formed by Saldaña, Carrión de los Condes and Herrera de Pisuerga and located at the foot of the route Jacobea that linked San Vicente de la Barquera with Carrión de los Condes through the Royal way of La Valdavia.

It is on the right bank of the Valdavia River, joined by the road PP-2454 called camino vecinal (0.8 km) to the kilometre 21.2 of the provincial road P236.

== Physical data ==
- Distance to Palencia: 75.6 km
- Distance to Burgos: 88.1 km
- Distance to Valladolid: 122.0 km
- Distance to León: 131.3 km
- Distance to Santander: 155.6 km

Crossed by the Valdavia River from north to south, Villamelendro is on its right bank.

== Demographic evolution ==
Historical population

Year	Pop.	±%
2000	28	—
2001	27	−3.6%
2002	24	−11.1%
2003	21	−12.5%
2004	19	−9.5%

Year	Pop.	±%
2005	18	−5.3%
2006	17	−5.6%
2007	17	+0.0%
2008	16	−5.9%
2009	16	+0.0%

Year	Pop.	±%
2010	16	+0.0%
2011	16	+0.0%
2018	12	−25.0%

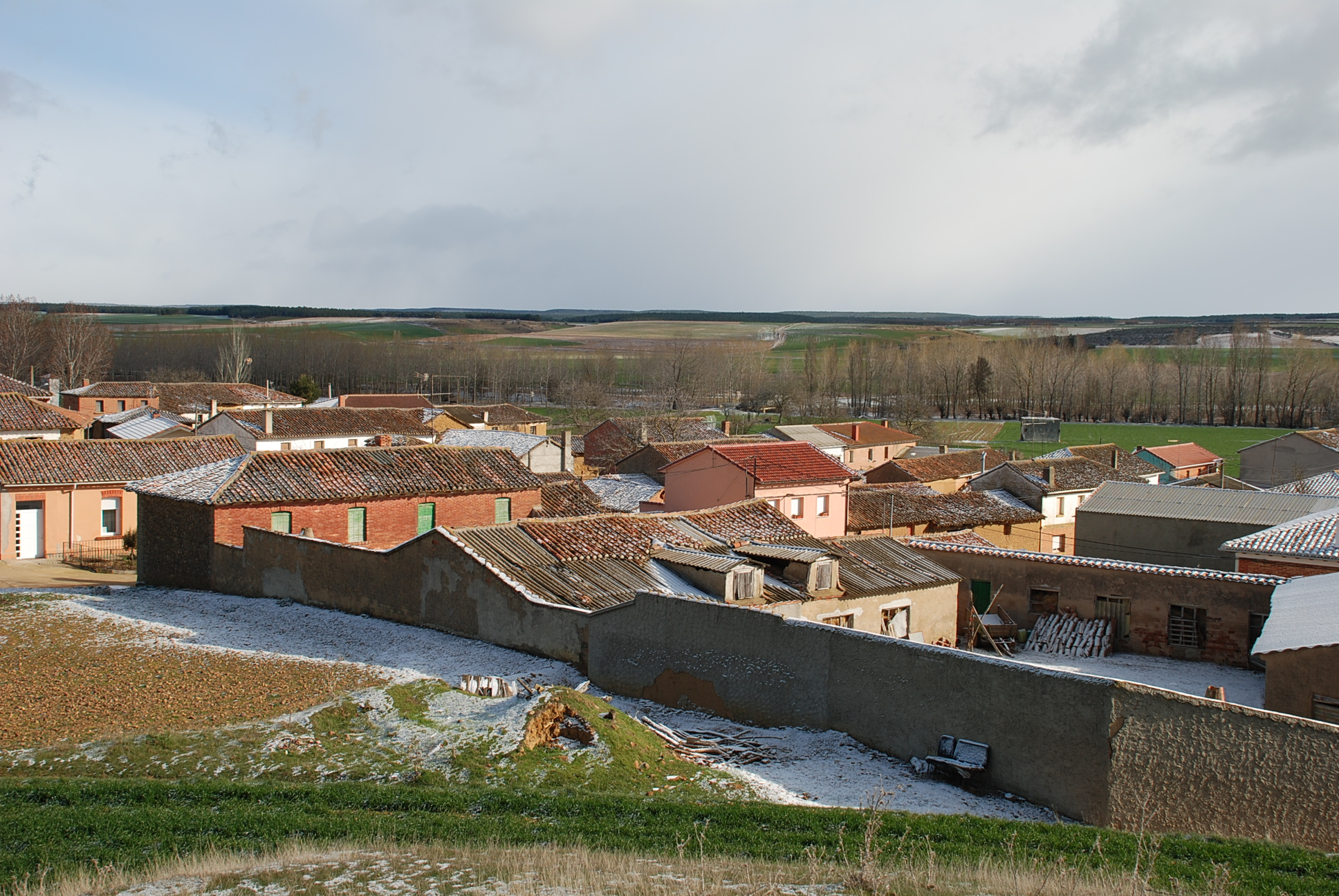
General view. 23 March 2008. Easter Sunday

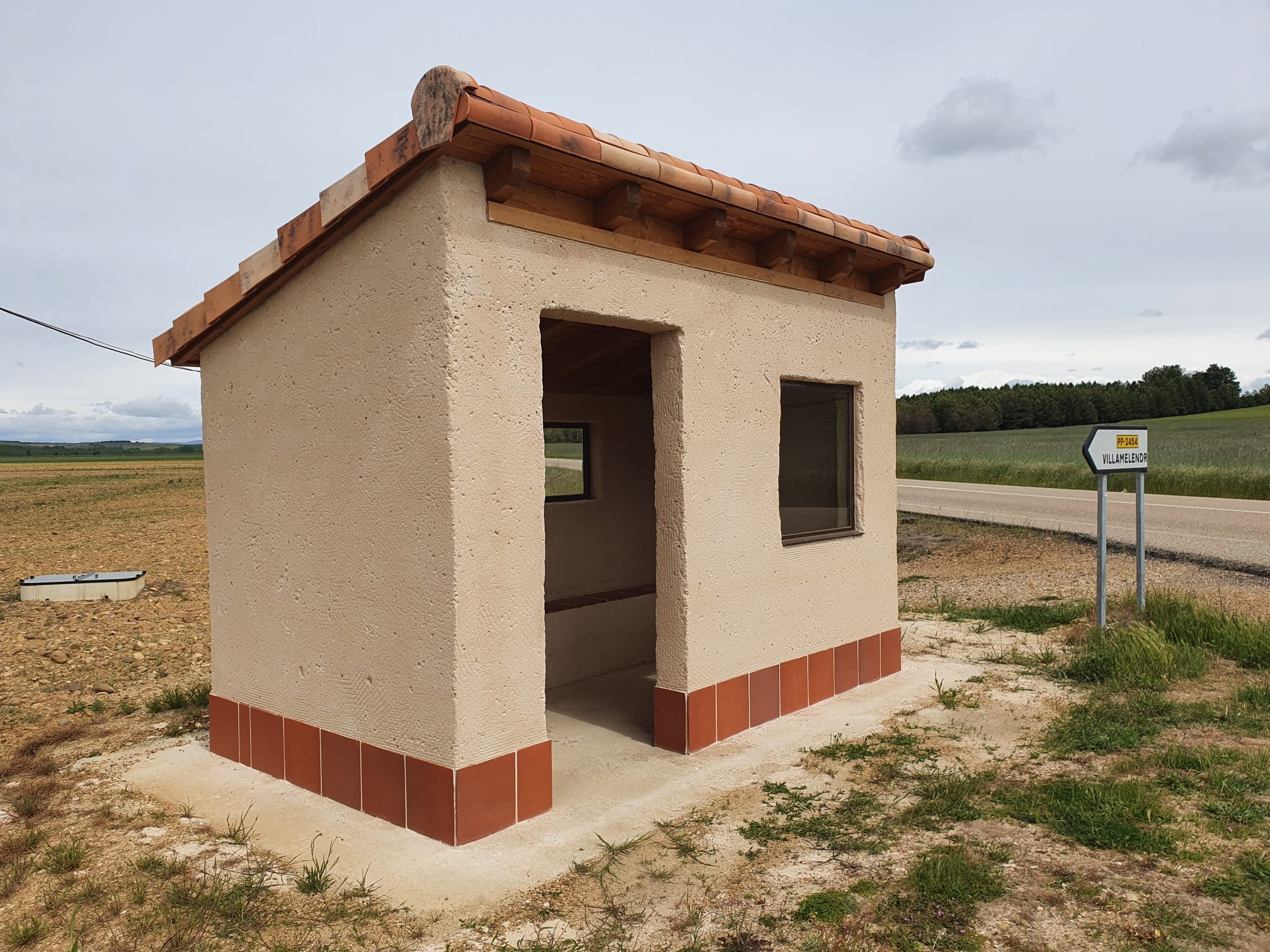
Villamelendro de Valdavia bus station at the crossroads of the provincial road P236 with the PP-2454 road, called "camino vecinal", 800 m. from the village centre.

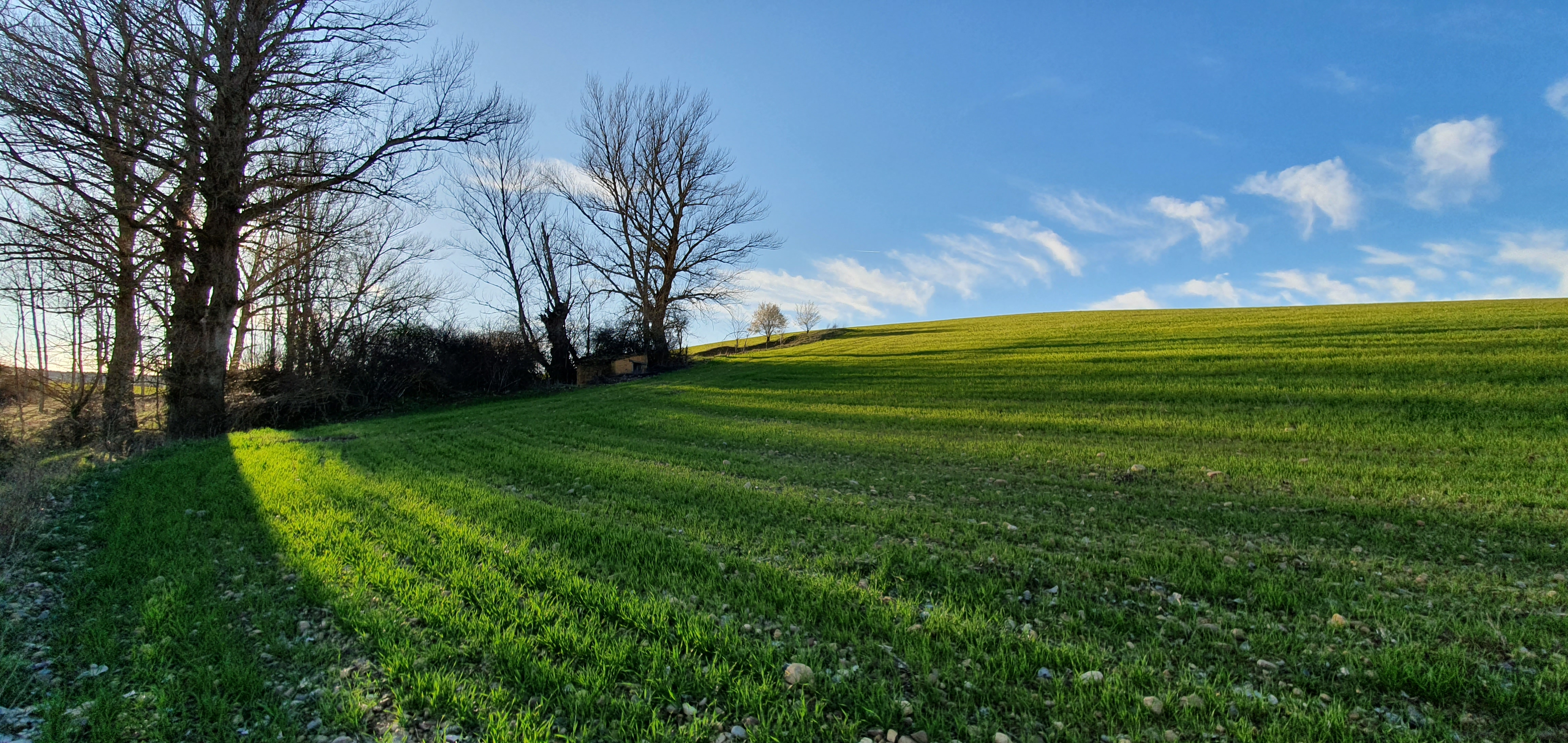
View of the hill of La Horca, with the access to the village fountain at its foot.

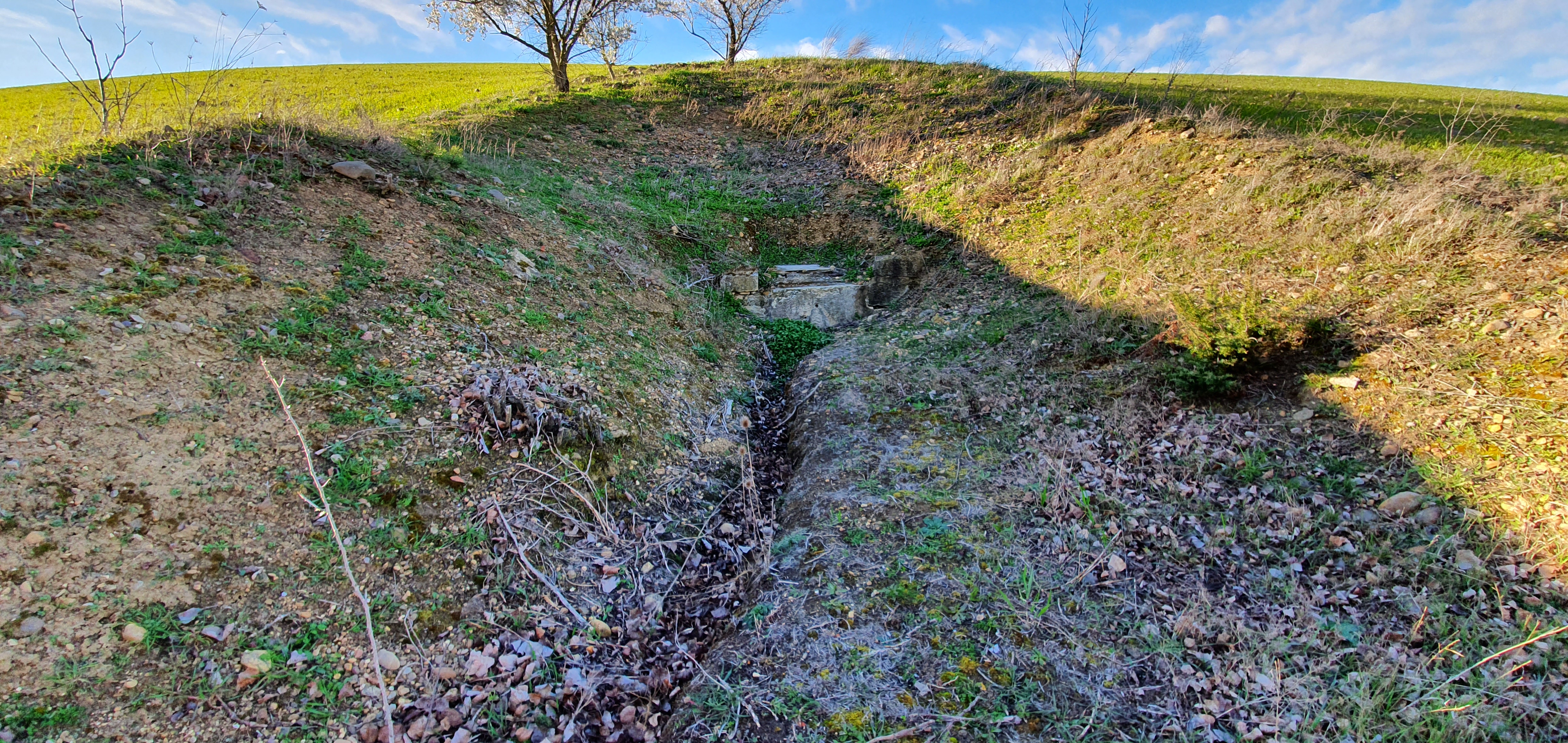
Village fountain.

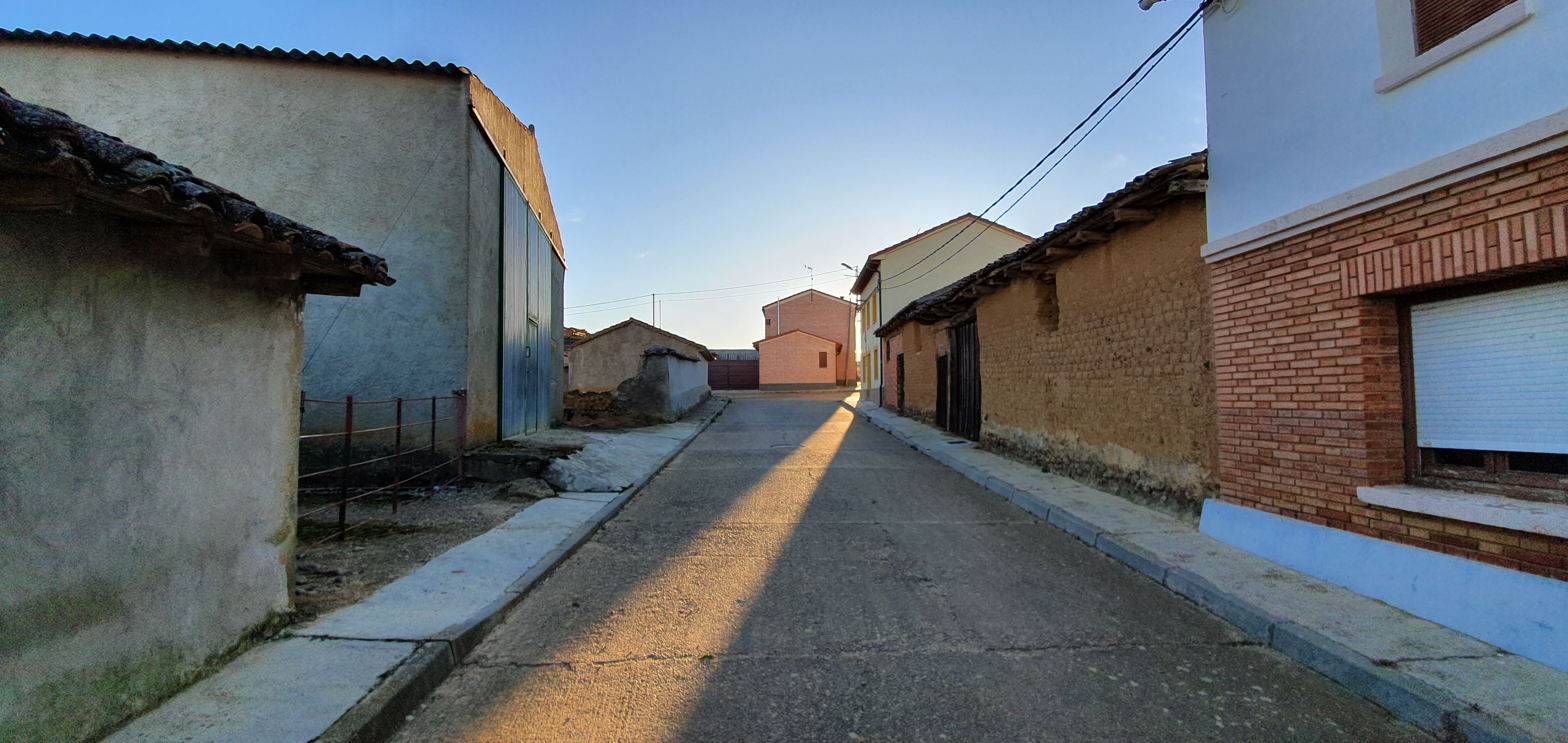
View of Sol Street. This street was the southernmost street in the primitive town centre, and the first to receive the morning rays, hence its name.

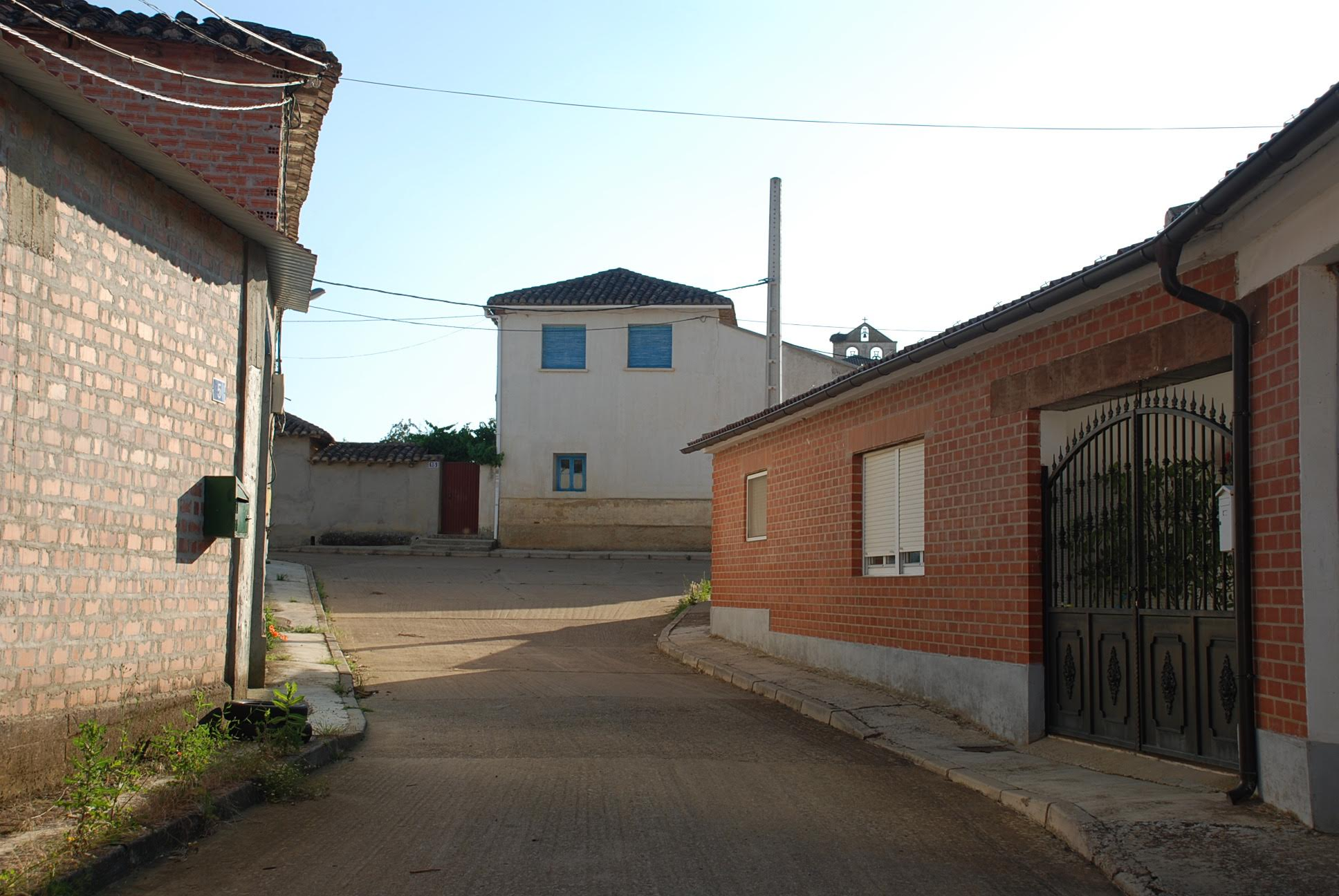
View of Cantarranas Street. Its name is related to its orientation towards the river, which amplified the sound made by these amphibians.

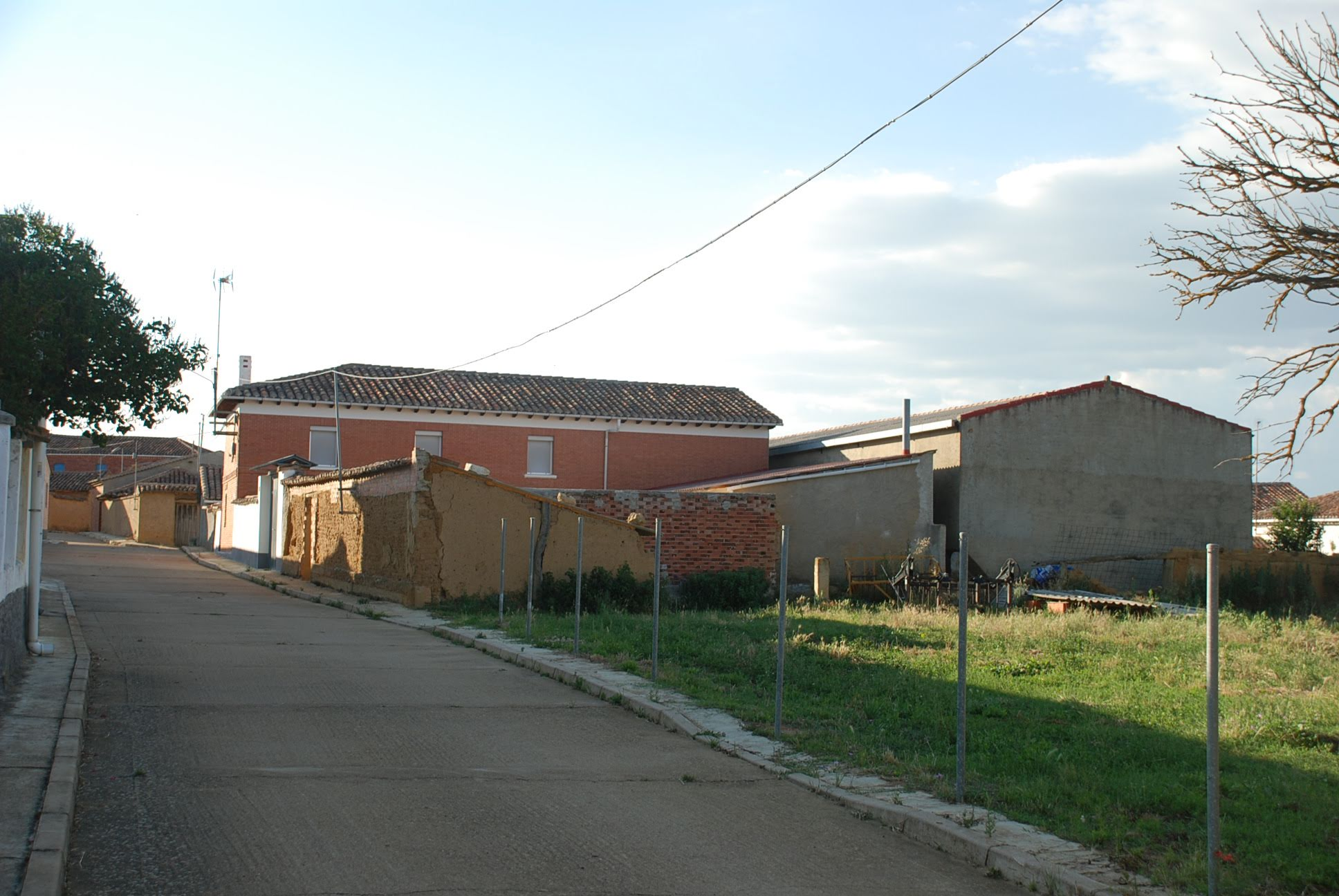
View of the Mayor Street. Longitudinal axis of the village and part of the Camino Real de la Valdavia as it passes through Villamelendro.

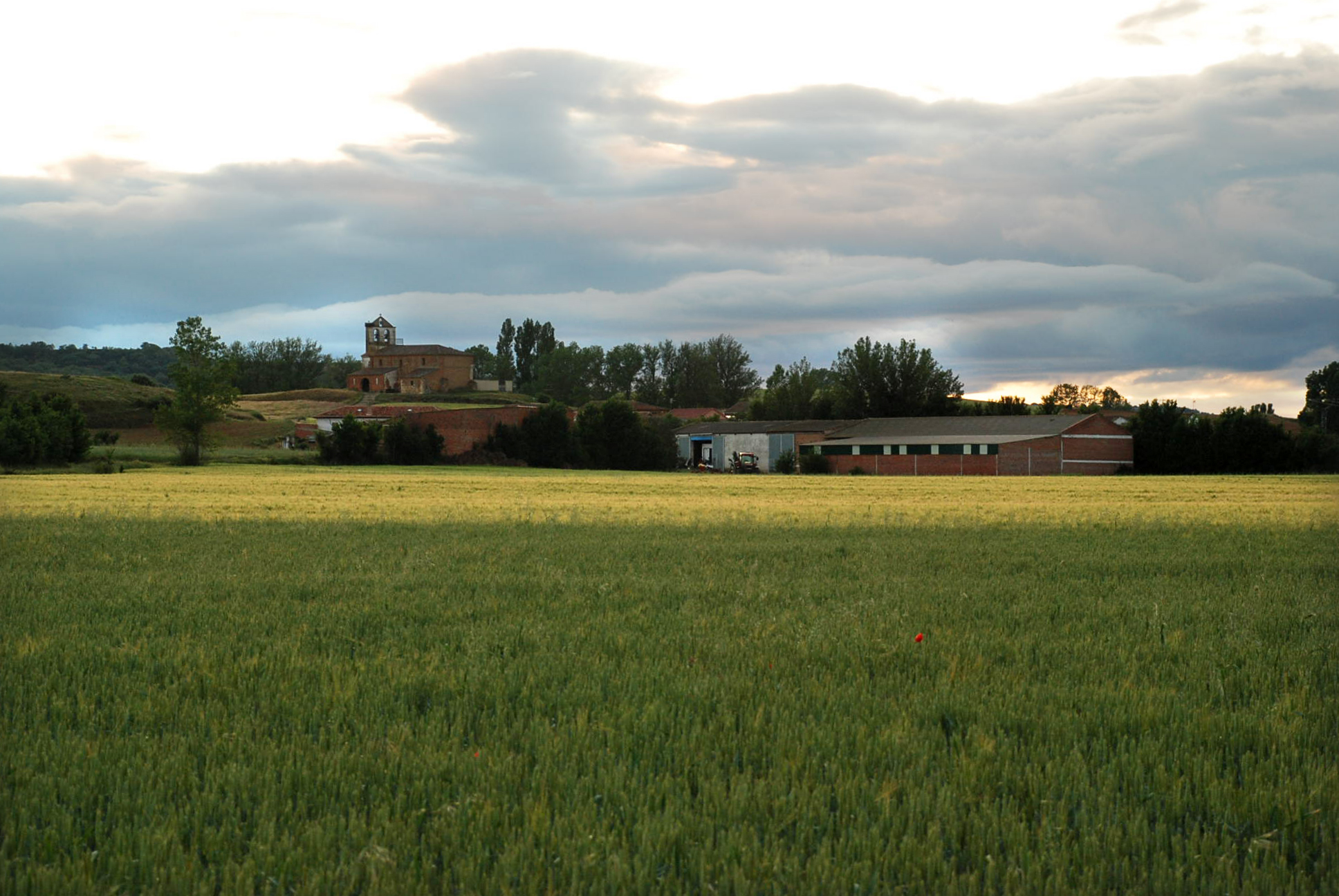
View of the village from the Vega.

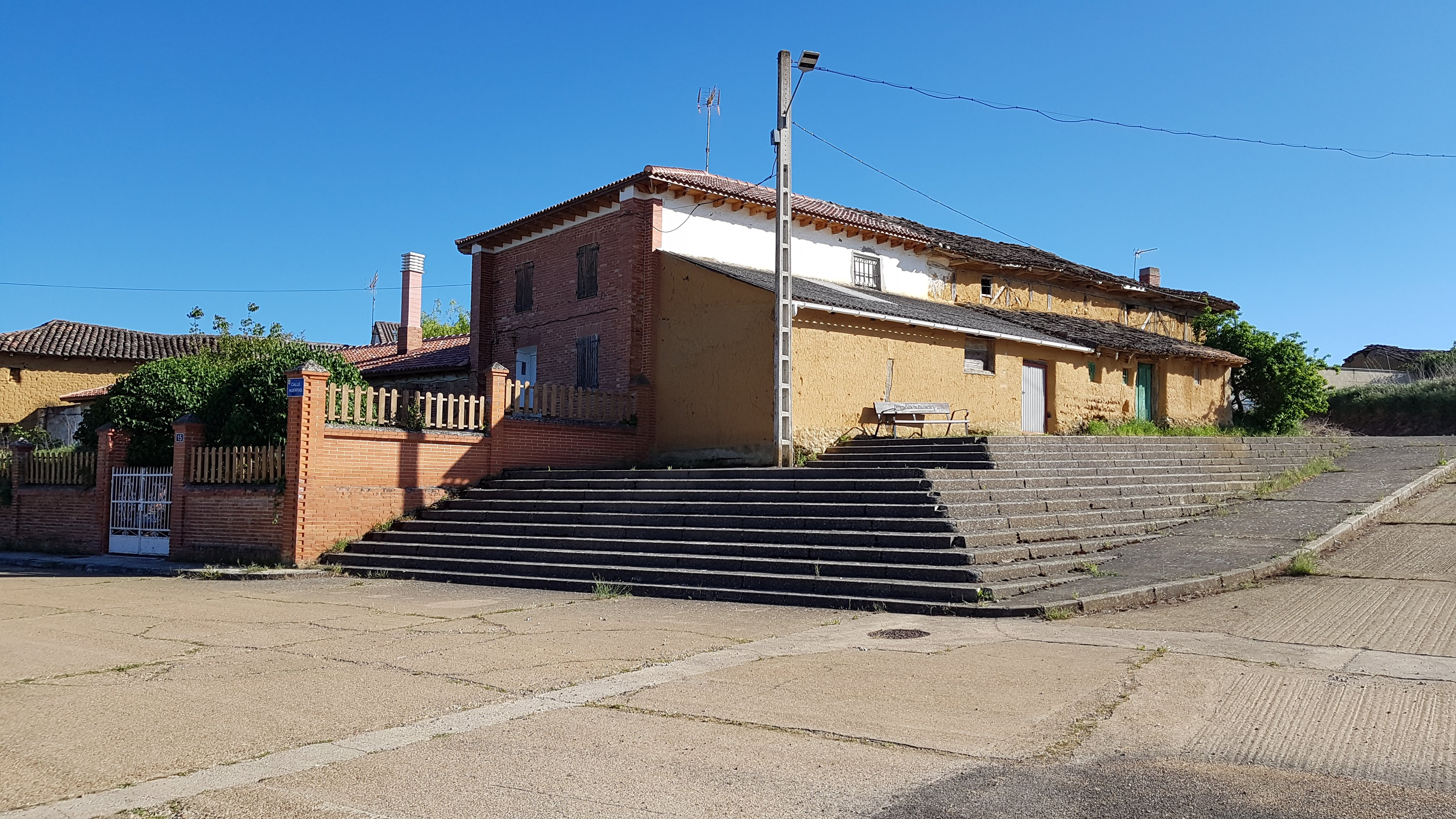
Entrance to the village.

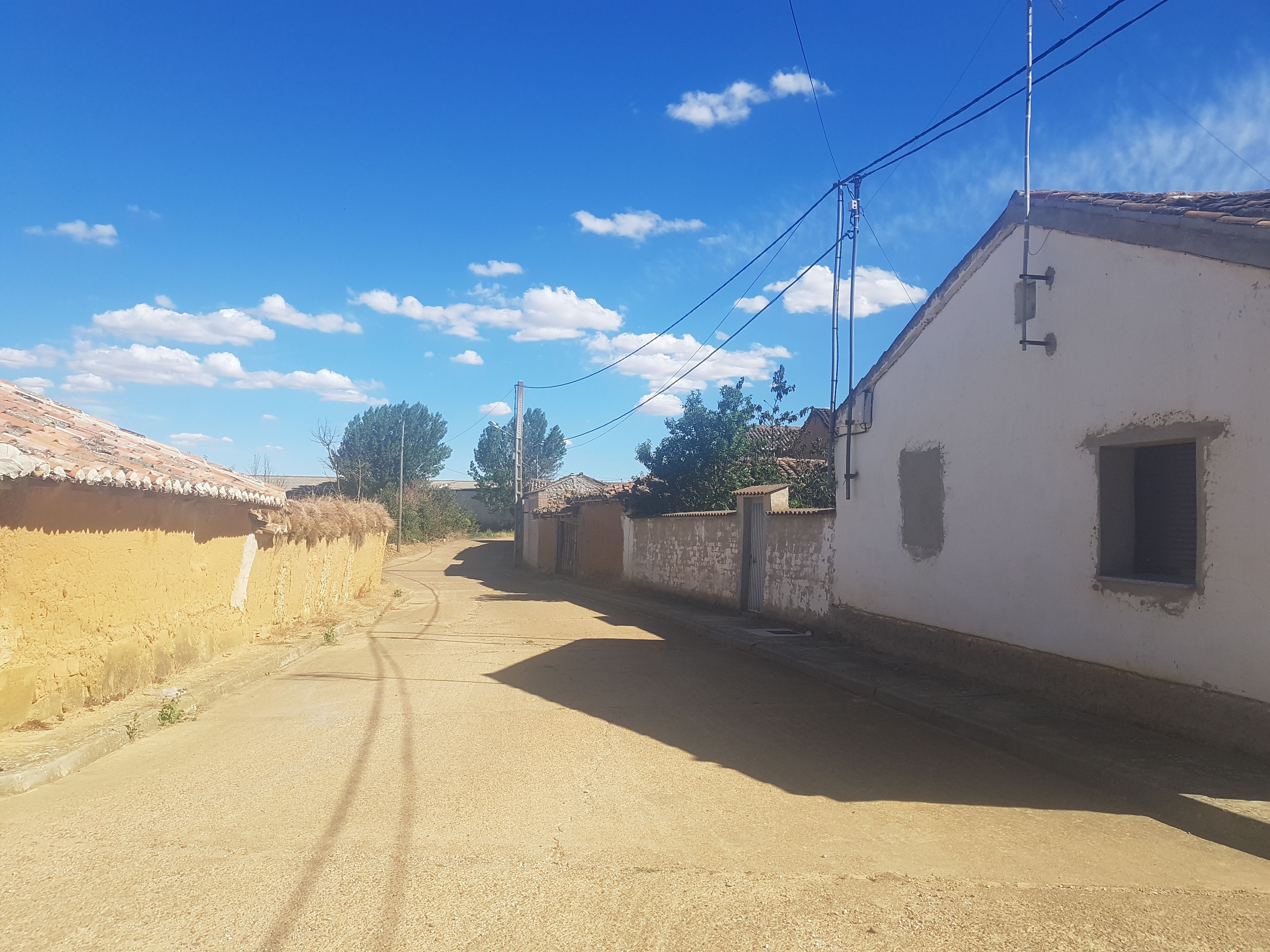
View of Huertas Street.

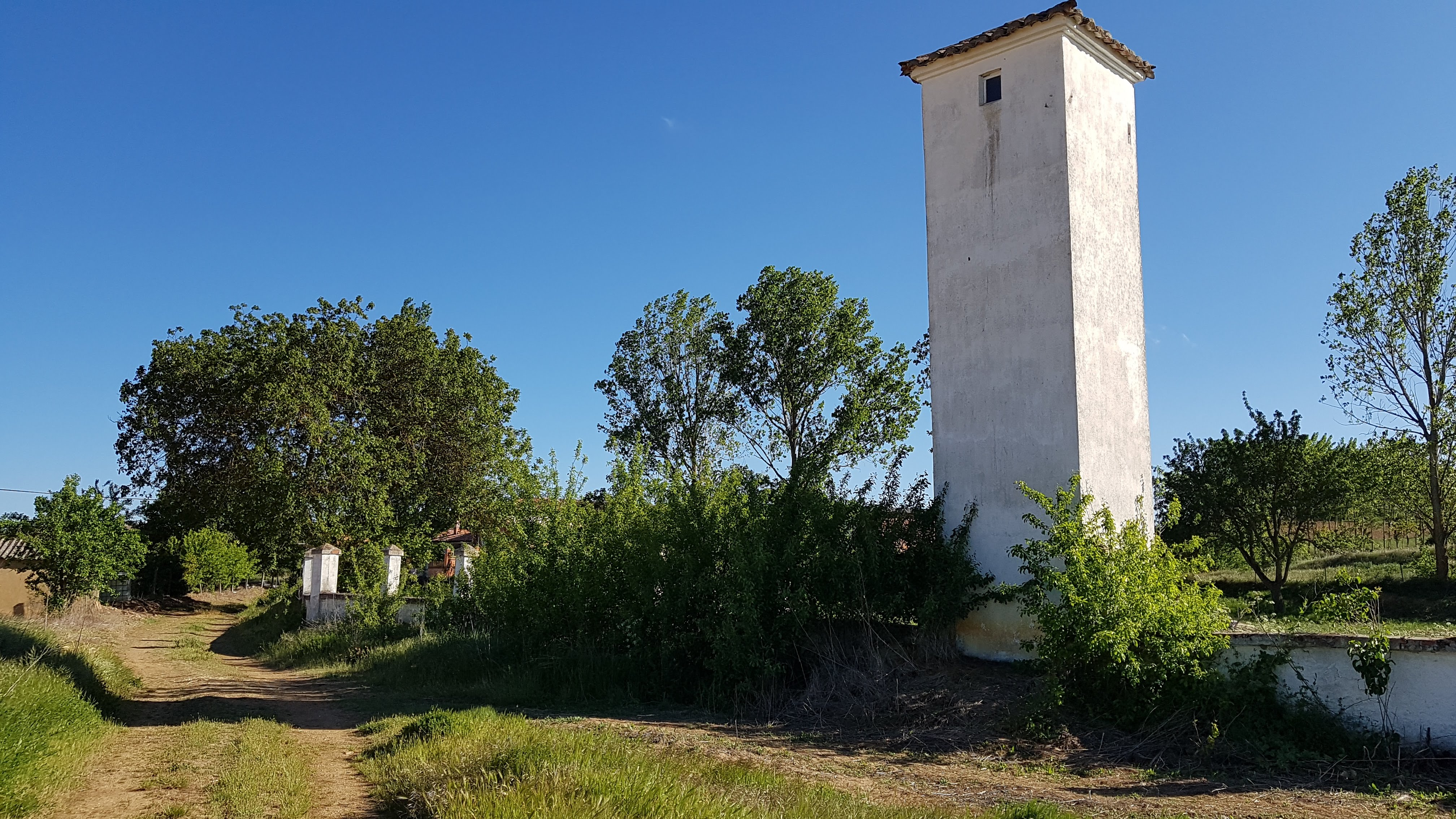
Camino de Vacas. This was the old exit from the village until 1948, when the current local road was laid out. This road used to lead to a wooden pontoon that no longer exists, which crossed the river Valdavia.

== Urban development ==
=== Location ===
The moment of the foundation of the present town centre of Villamelendro, around the 9th century, was preceded by three circumstances that determined its location: On the one hand, the northern repopulators of the late Middle Ages found the ruins of a series of buildings of Roman origin in the vicinity of the hill where the Church of Our Lady currently stands. On the other hand, crossing the arroyo de Matafrades, on the southern slope of the alto de la Horca, there was a permanent source of drinking water that guaranteed the provision of any settlement. And finally, both ruins and fountain were at the confluence of a crossroads.

From the West, coming from the Morcorio, the old road of Saldaña arrived, through Vega de Doña Olimpa. This road, crossing the river Valdavia, would project itself along the so-called road of cows in the direction of Sotobañado y Priorato and would cross with another, the royal road of Valdavia, on the northwest–southeast axis that would run through the region of Valdavia parallel to the river.

From Congosto, passing through La Puebla, Buenavista, the depopulated area of Santa María de Villaverde, Polvorosa, Renedo, Arenillas de San Pelayo, always on the left bank until it reaches Villaeles where it would cross the river and continue on its right bank along the river terraces that are not flooded, entering Villamelendro by the Villabasta road. Then it would cross the whole village until it left by the Arnillas path towards the Villanes de Villanuño and Bárcena de Campos to connect at the height of the Esperina with the camino del Besaya towards Carrión de los Condes.

It is the establishment of buildings along this road that gives an elongated shape to the town centre, articulating around the Calle Mayor, which is the name taken by the camino real de la Valdavia as it passes through Villamelendro.

=== Construction phases ===
The village has two clearly differentiated construction phases.

Depending on the position of the Church, the village fountain and the area where the Roman vicus was presumably located, we can deduce a first phase in which the oldest part of the urban centre would be the one in the far north. Specifically, the group of houses that go from the slope where the camino de Villabasta arrives to the calle Sol. This means that the intersection of the Calle Mayor with the Calle Cantarranas is the area where the original settlement of the repopulation village was structured, gradually projecting towards the river in the direction of the Calle de las Huertas which would close the complex from the east.

On the other hand, a second phase, where the rest of the houses that are to the South of the Calle Sol are being built, which although now it is in the center of the village, takes its name at a time when it was the southern end of the village, being the first street of the village to which the sun was shining at dawn. This evolution was the result of population growth and improved production conditions in the area from the sixteenth and seventeenth centuries.

=== Local road ===
The Camino Real de la Valdavia, together with the Camino Viejo de Saldaña, would be the main communication routes through which goods and travellers would arrive at the village, the Camino Real de la Valdavia being the main artery of the valley. Although there was a wooden bridge and lawns about 30 metres to the north of the current bridge, it was not until 1948 that this was built and the local road connecting to the Valdavia road was asphalted, which is the main axis of communication today.

== Illustrious sons ==
- Lucas Espinosa (1895-1975): father Augustin and eminent Palencia philologist born in Villabasta, but that spent long seasons in Villamelendro. Specializing in indigenous languages Kokama, Kokamilla and Omagua of the Amazon, Peru.
- Matías Santos, doctor in Medicine by Universidad de Alcalá in 1678, where their course records are preserved, Quodlibet, Alfonsina, bachelor's degree and doctoral degree.

== Heritage ==
- Church of Our Lady of the Assumption: A work of brick, masonry and stonework, with a modern tower of belfry at its feet, which replaced the old tower of masonry and brick, with a hipped roof and two loopholes, which in the middle of the 20th century threatened ruin. Brick doorway of semicircular arch, preceded by a cobbled portico and an arched access doorway to sardinel, on the Epistle side. The interior consists of a single nave, separated by ashlar arches in three bodies covered with groin vault and a high wooden choir at the feet. On the side of the presbytery is the main altarpiece from the first half of the 17th century with paintings on the bench of the Annunciation and Adoration of the Shepherds, flanked by four small panels representing the Fathers of the Church, from left to right: St Augustine of Hippo, St Gregory the Great, St Ambrose of Milan and St Jerome of Stridon on which four columns Corinthian Order are supported as an allegory for the pillars of the Church. The altarpiece is articulated around a central niche with the image of Asunción presiding and in the side streets four panels with paintings of the martyrdom of Julita y Quirico, and in the attic Crucifix. Tabernacle with relief of the Resurrection on the door. The current work dates mostly from the 16th century, and presented problems from early times. It was necessary to reinforce the building with period buttresses so that they would reinforce the pressures that the groin vaults projected outwards. In the area of the apse it is reinforced with very thick but low buttresses, as in this area the church tends to open up as well. In the cemetery area, the base of these buttresses are eroded by humidity and burials, leaving the building unprotected. That is why in the mid-20th century the arch of the presbytery was reinforced with a double tensor that gave it stability. The second arch of the nave, however, is increasingly giving way inwards, endangering the integrity of the second vault. This is the reason why this building is included in the Red List of Heritage of the Association for the care and promotion of Heritage Hispania Nostra since November 2019.
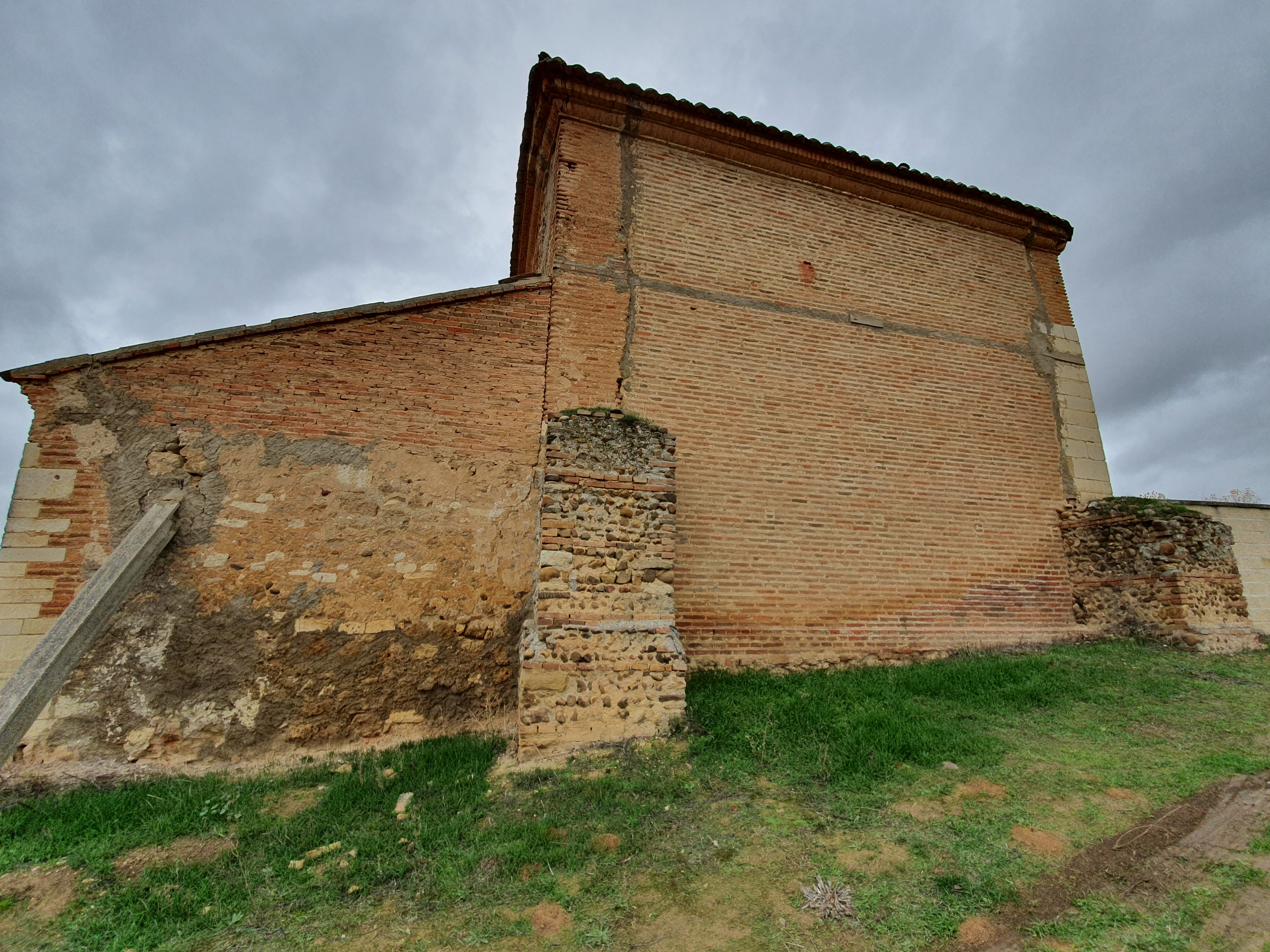
View of the apse.

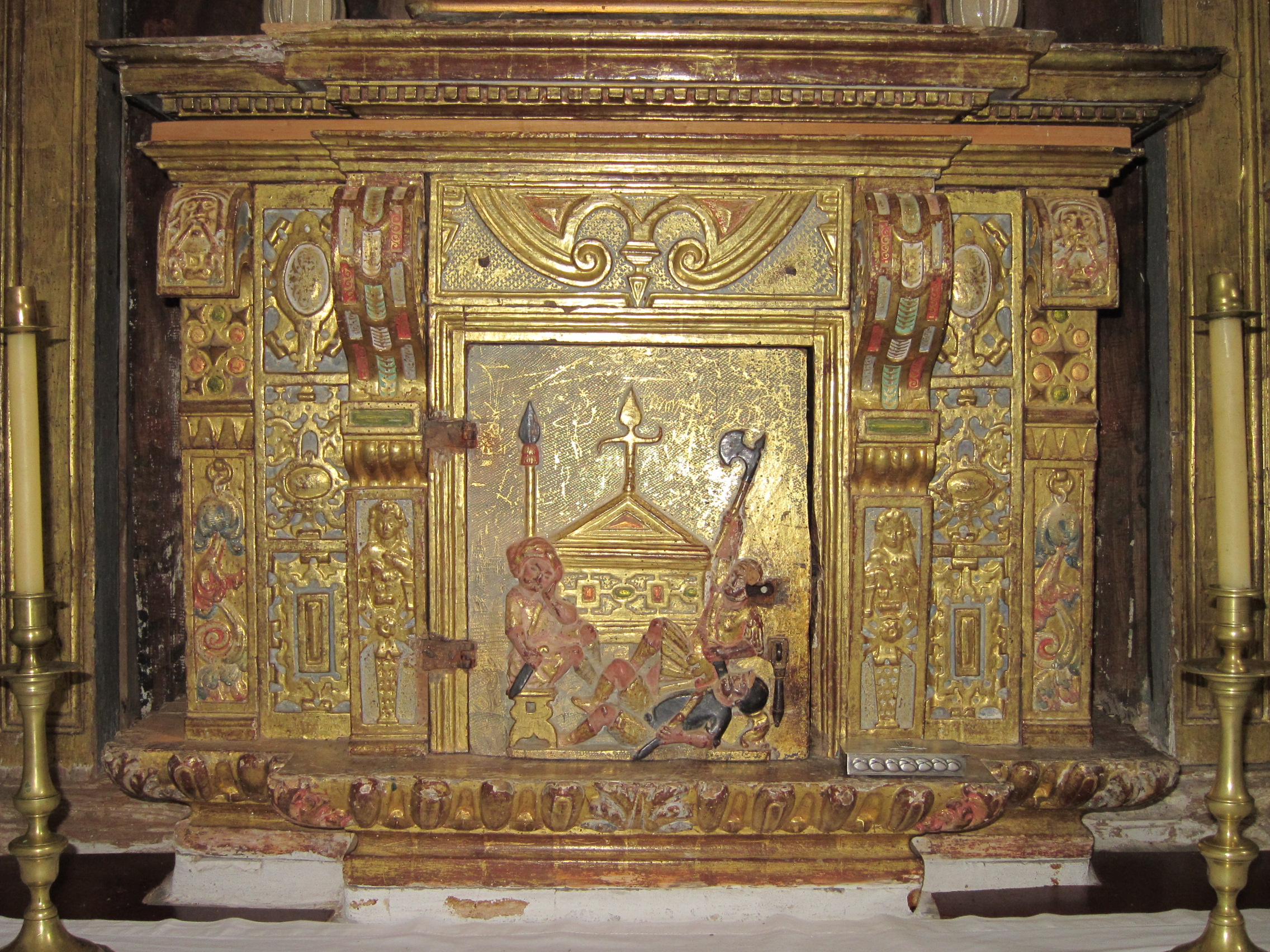
Tabernacle with relief of the Resurrection.

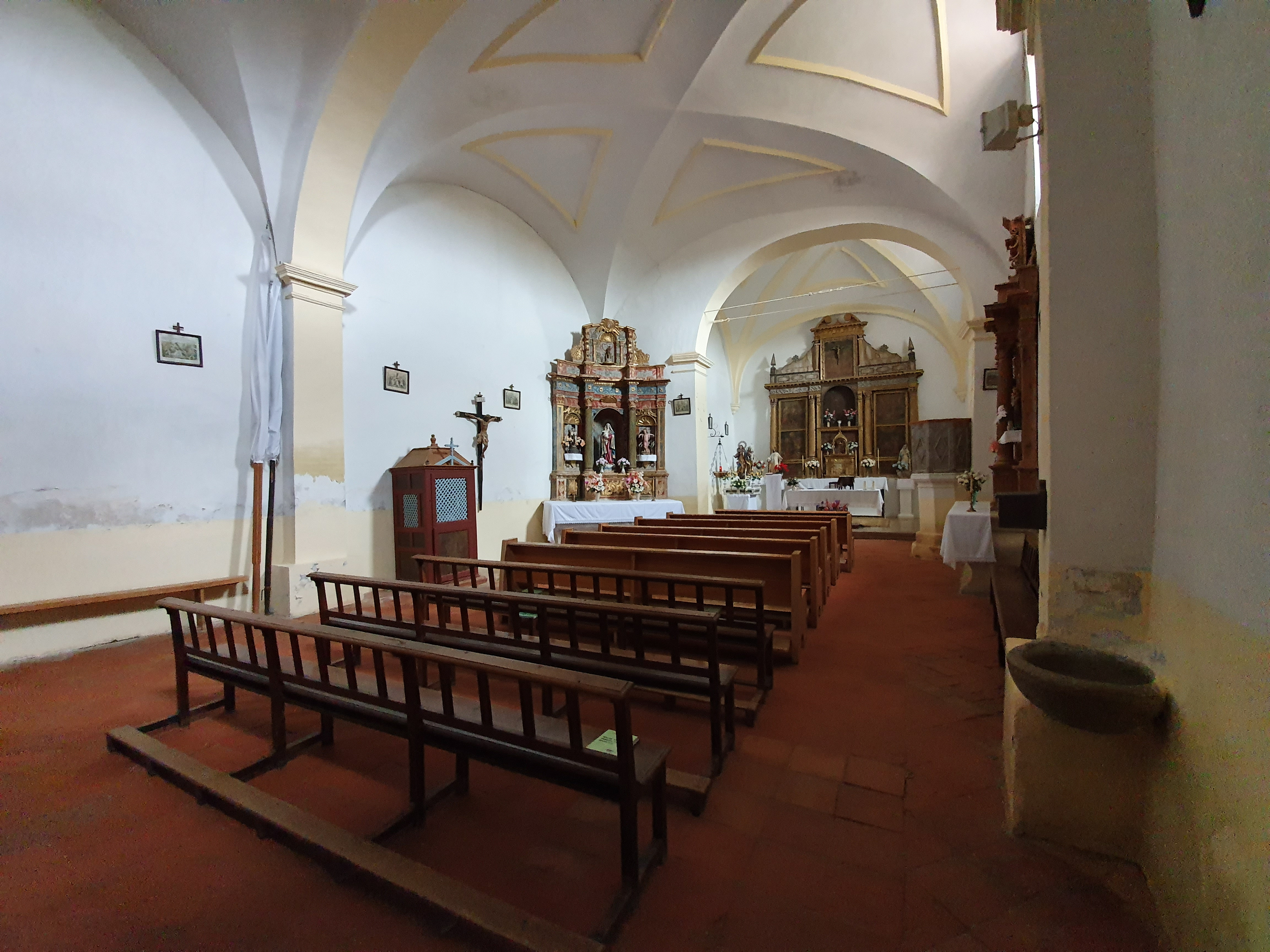
Interior of the temple.

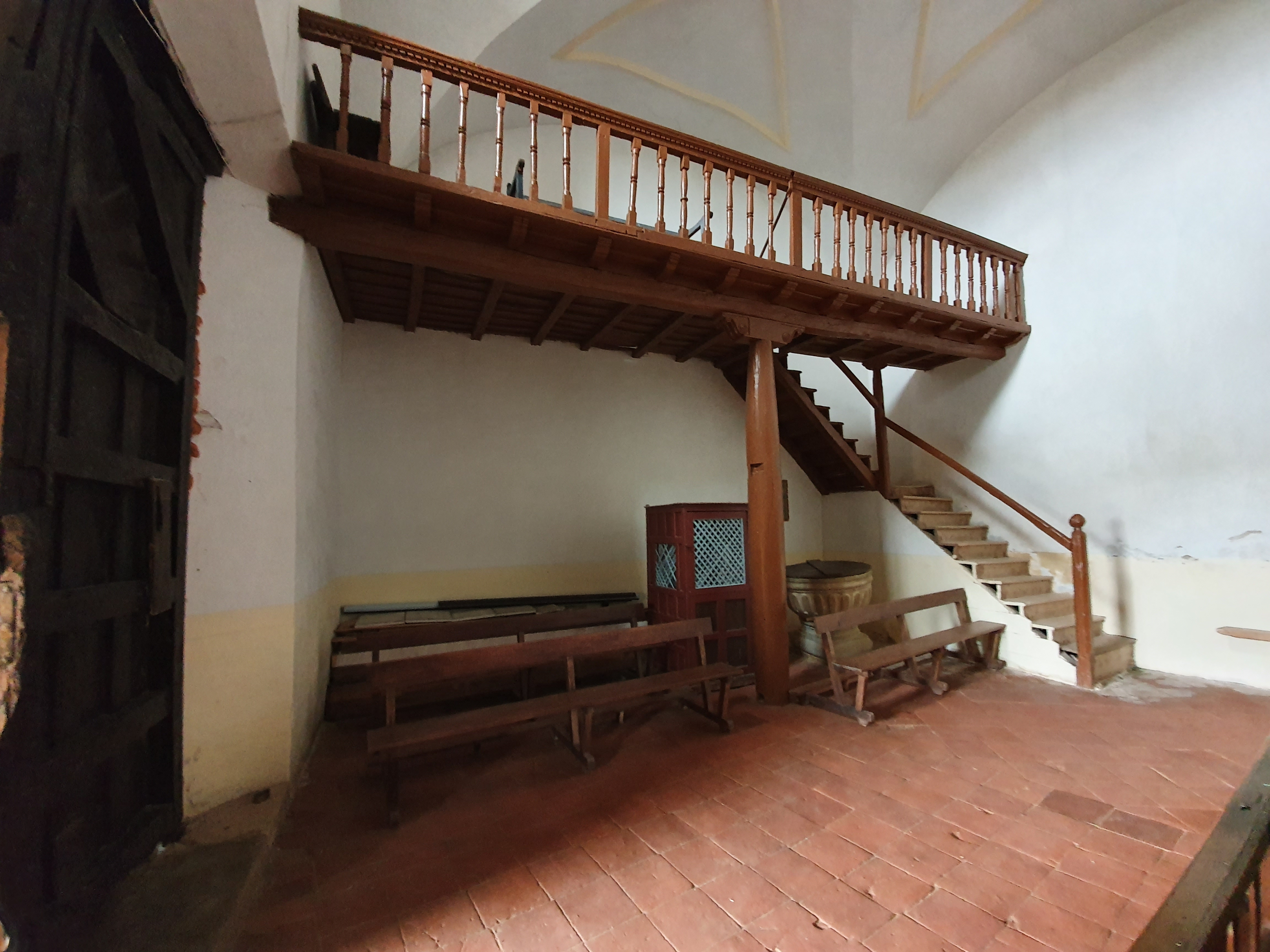
View of the choir loft.

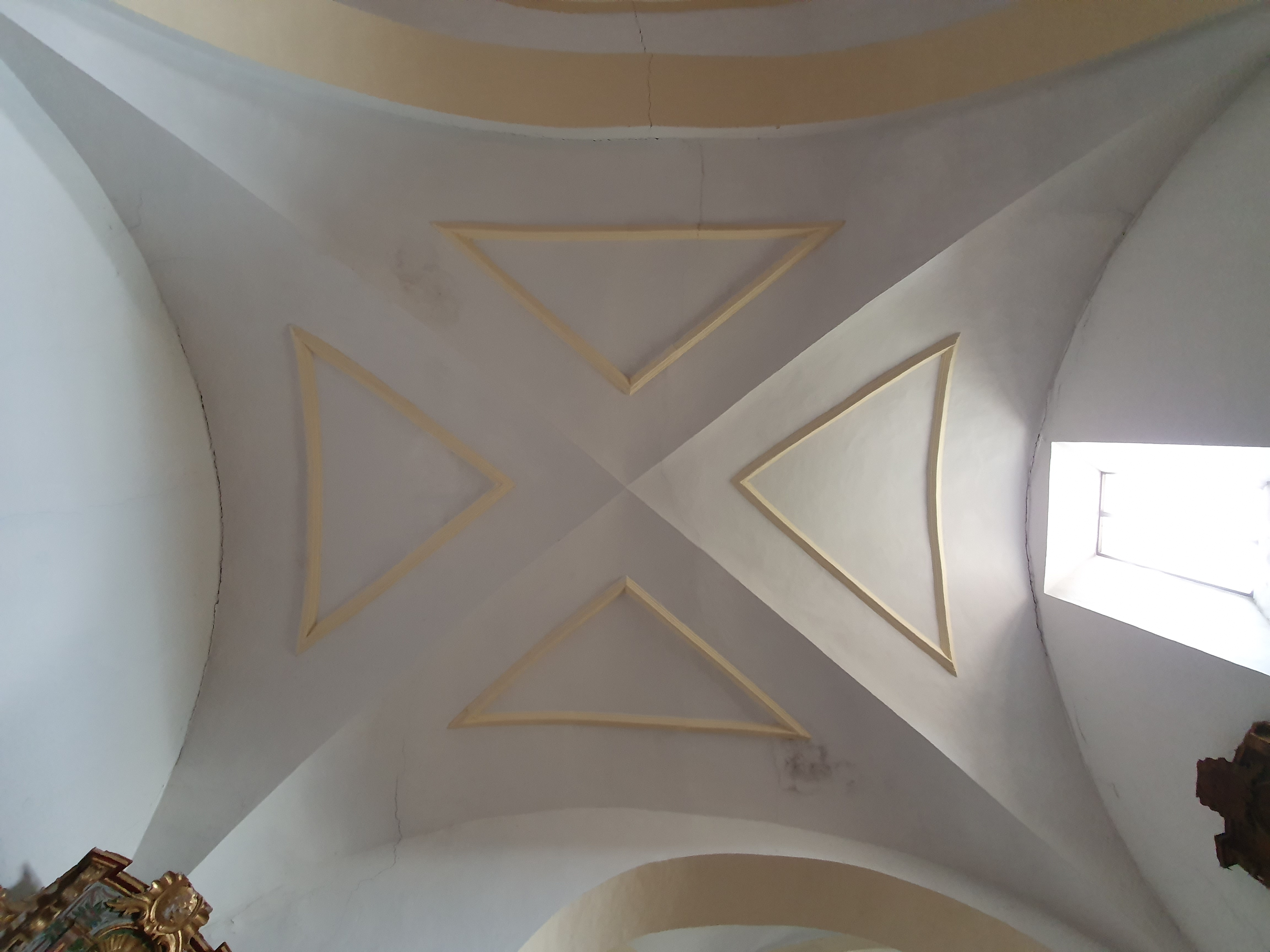
Vault of edges.

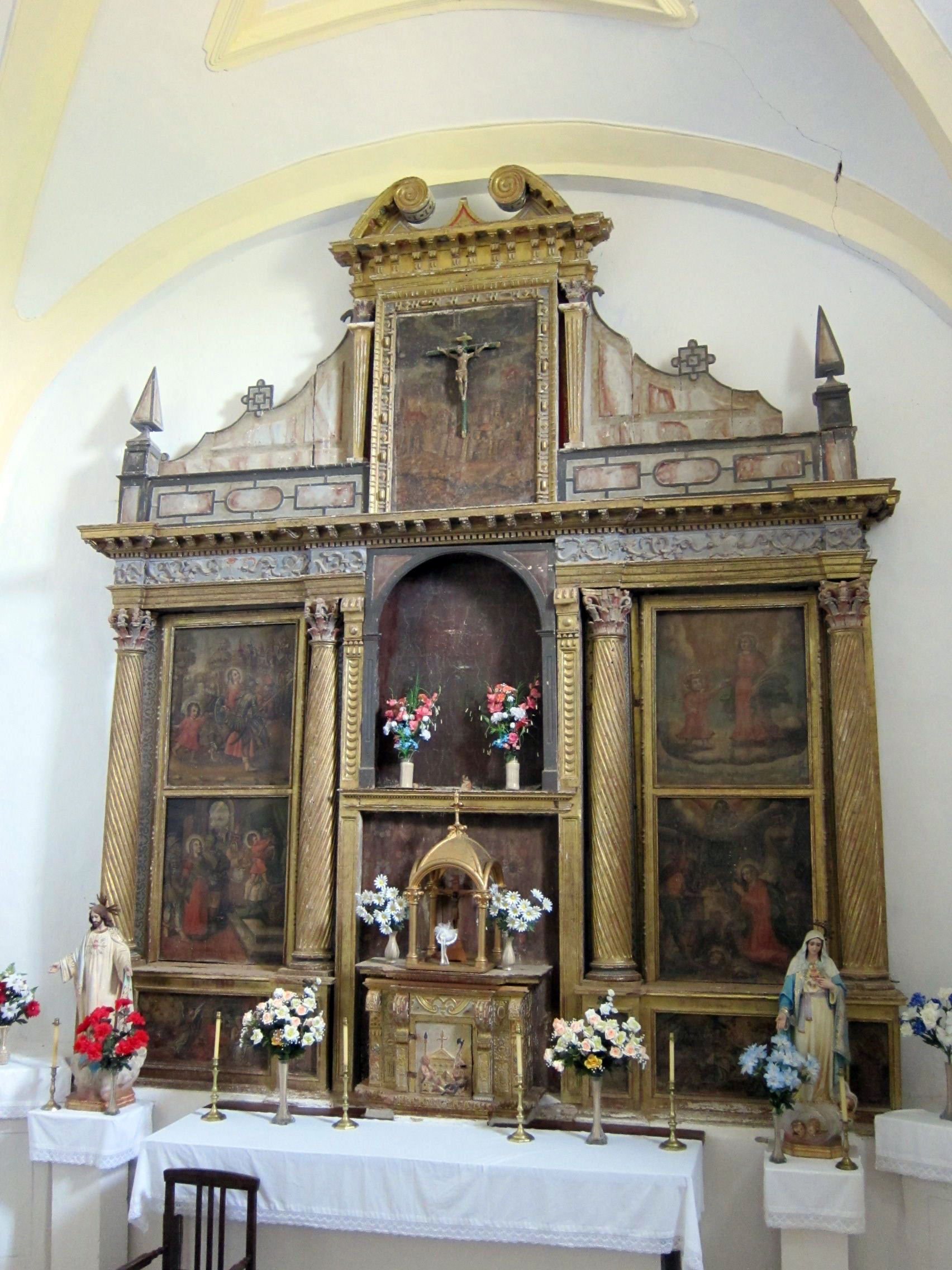
Main altarpiece.

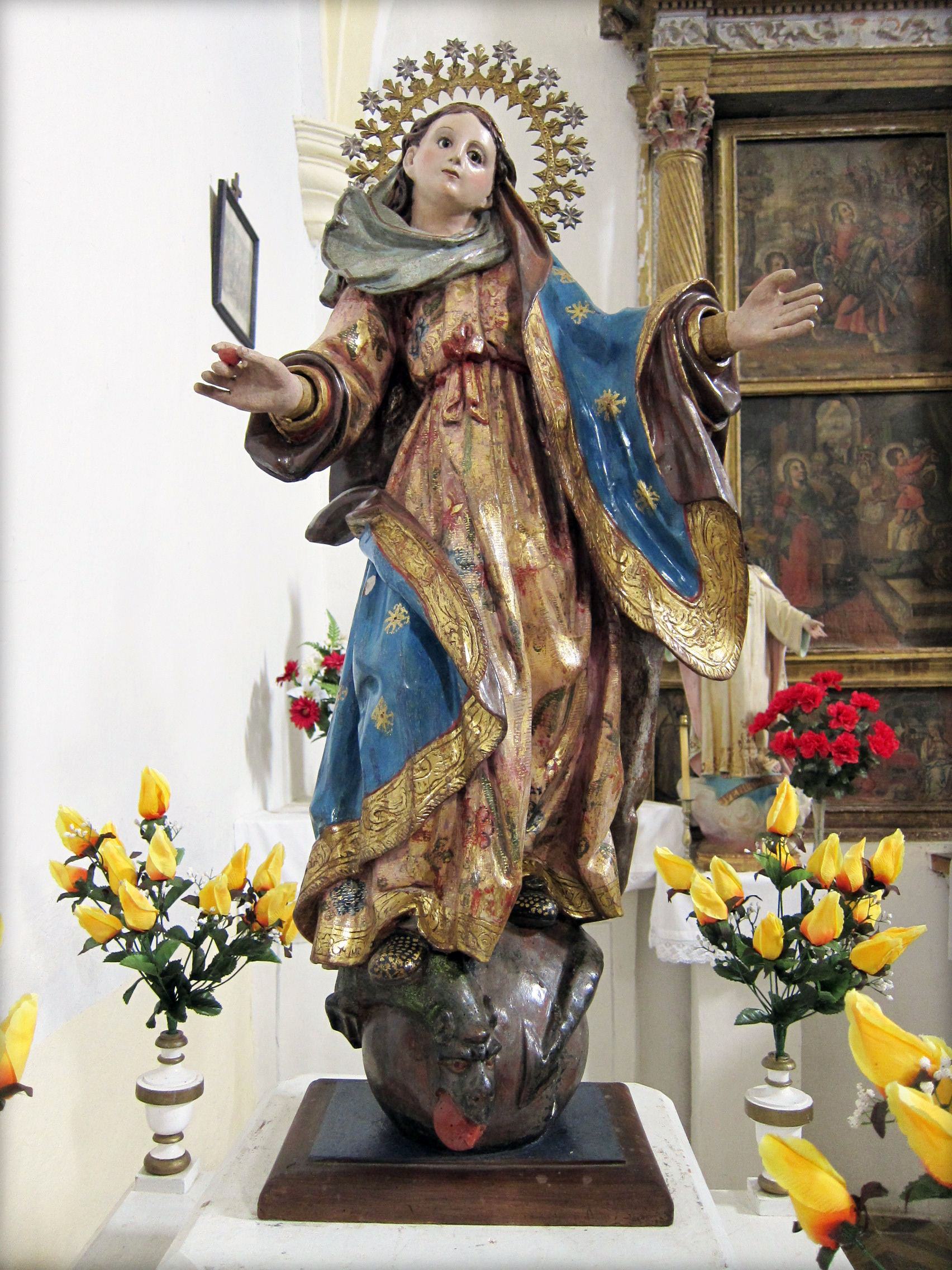
Image of Our Lady.

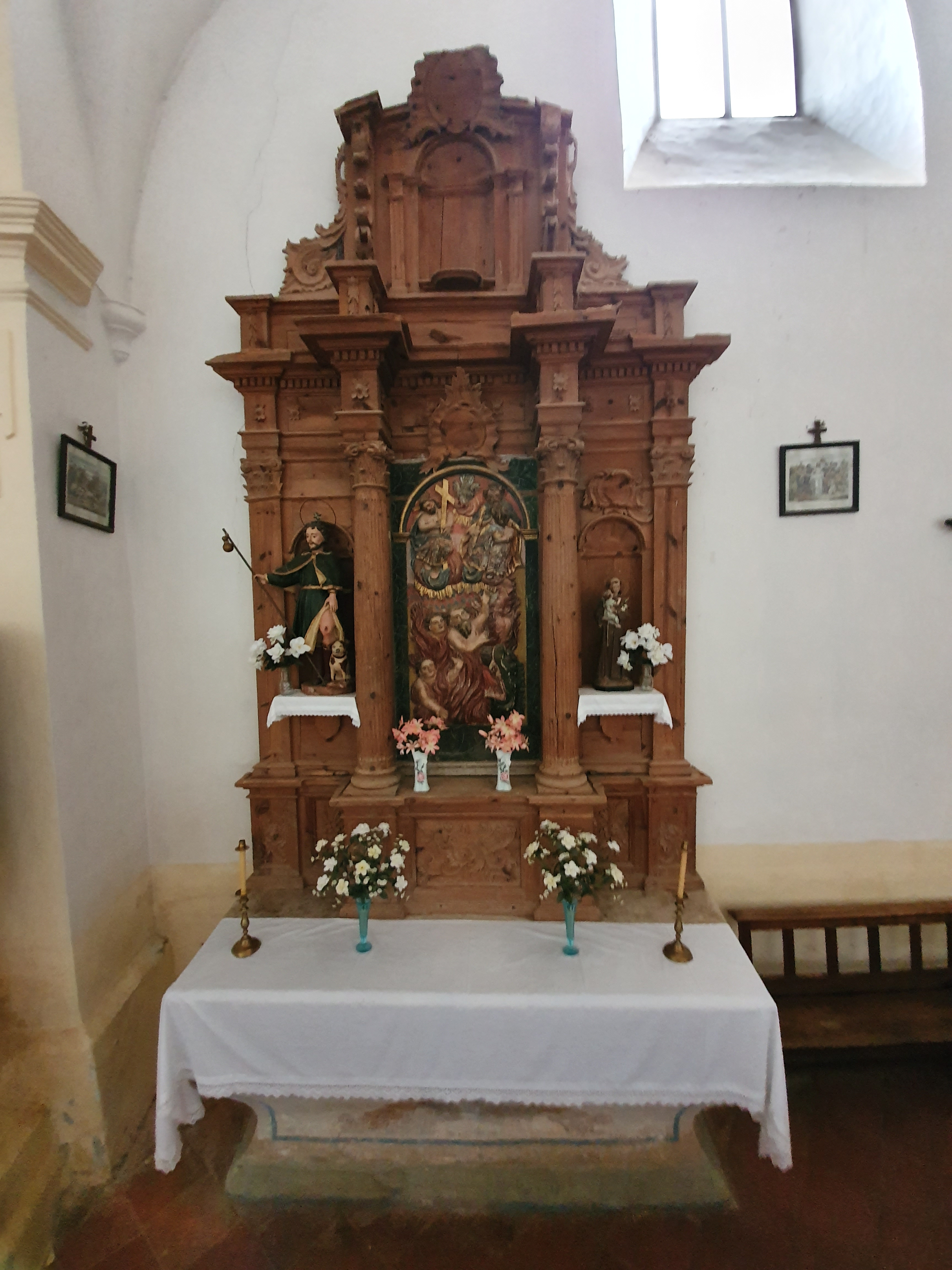
Souls altarpiece.

== History ==
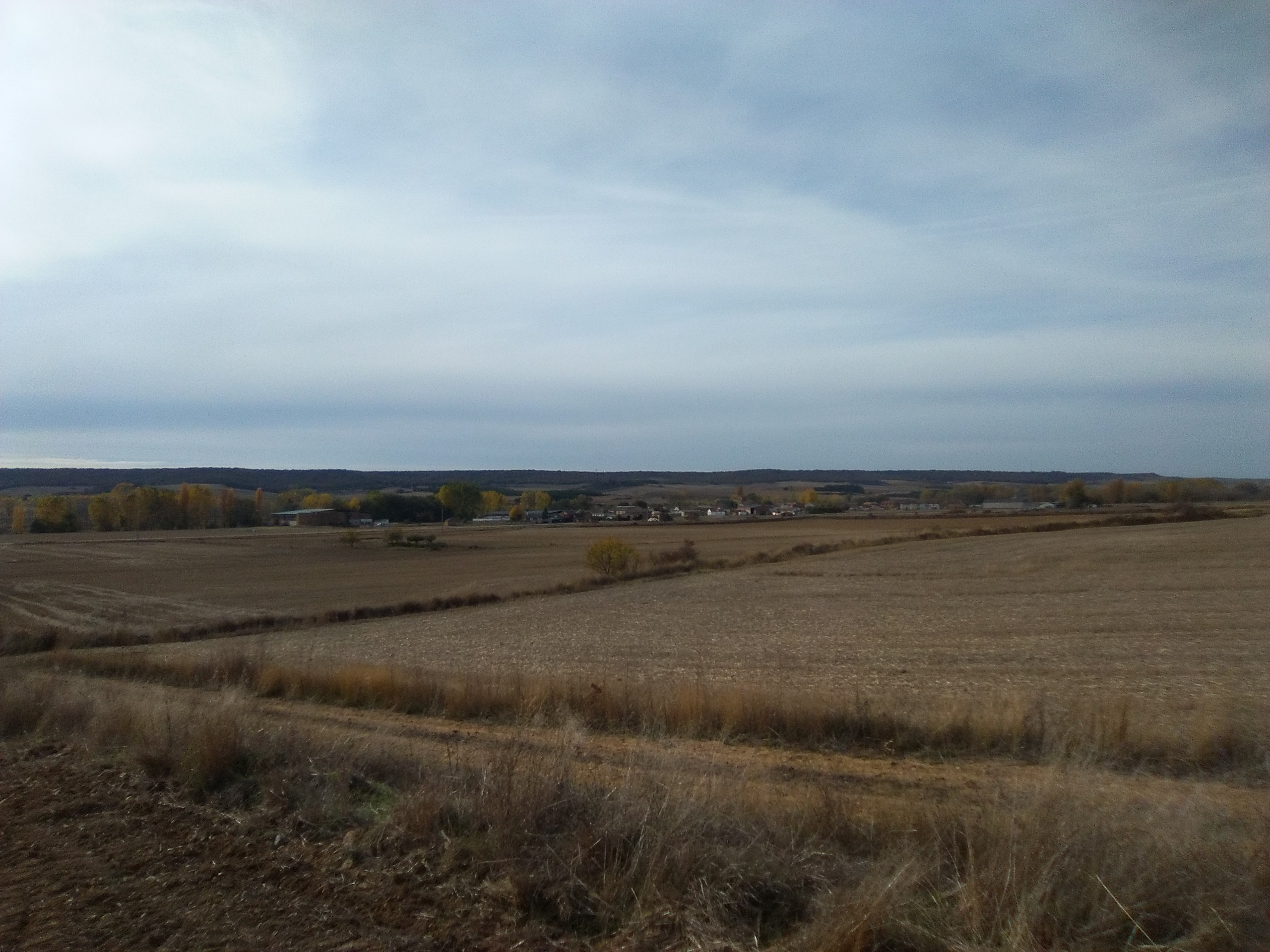
View of Villasila from the site of the uninhabited village of Cardeñosa.

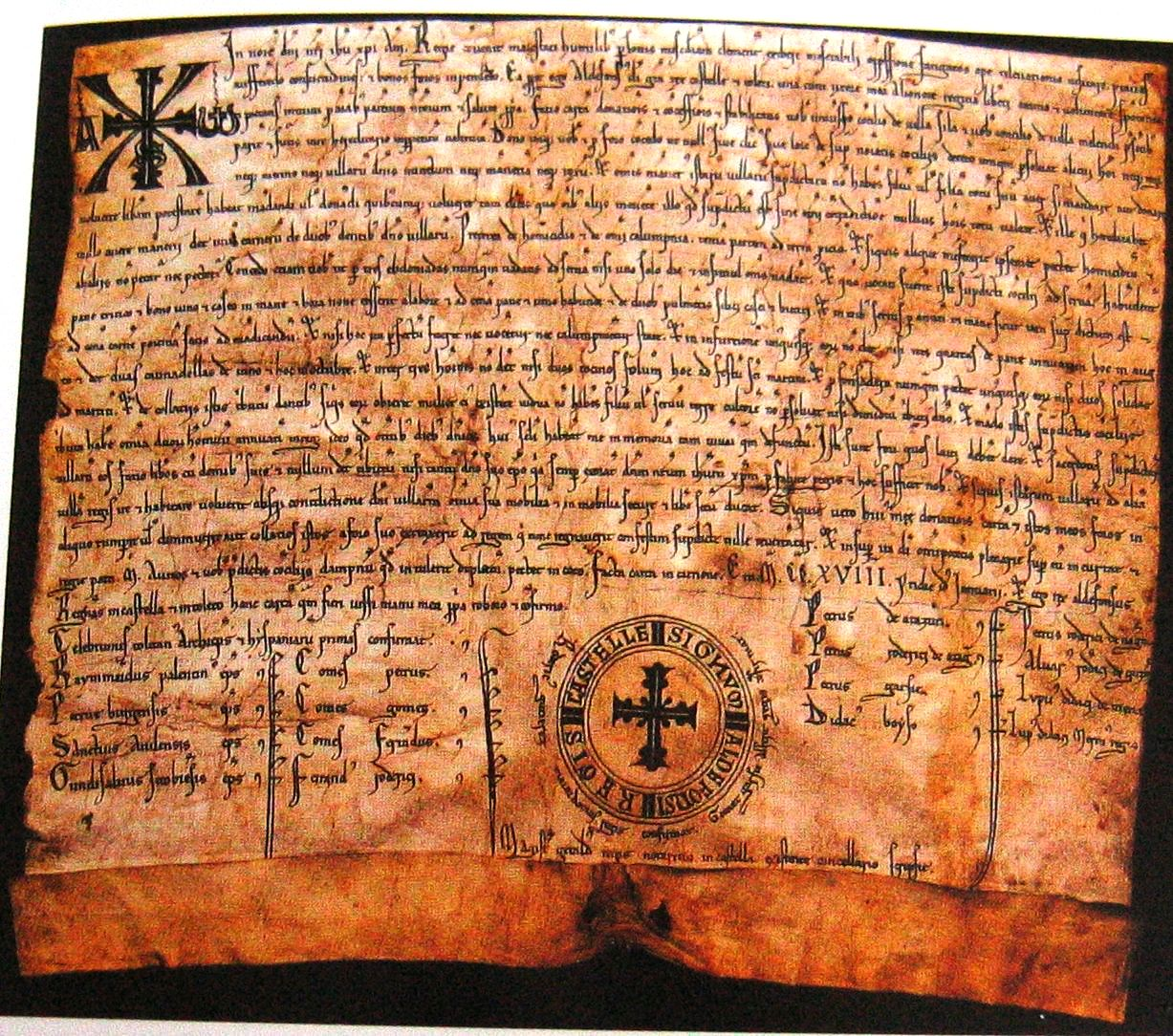
Fuero by Alfonso VIII to Villasila and Villamelendro.

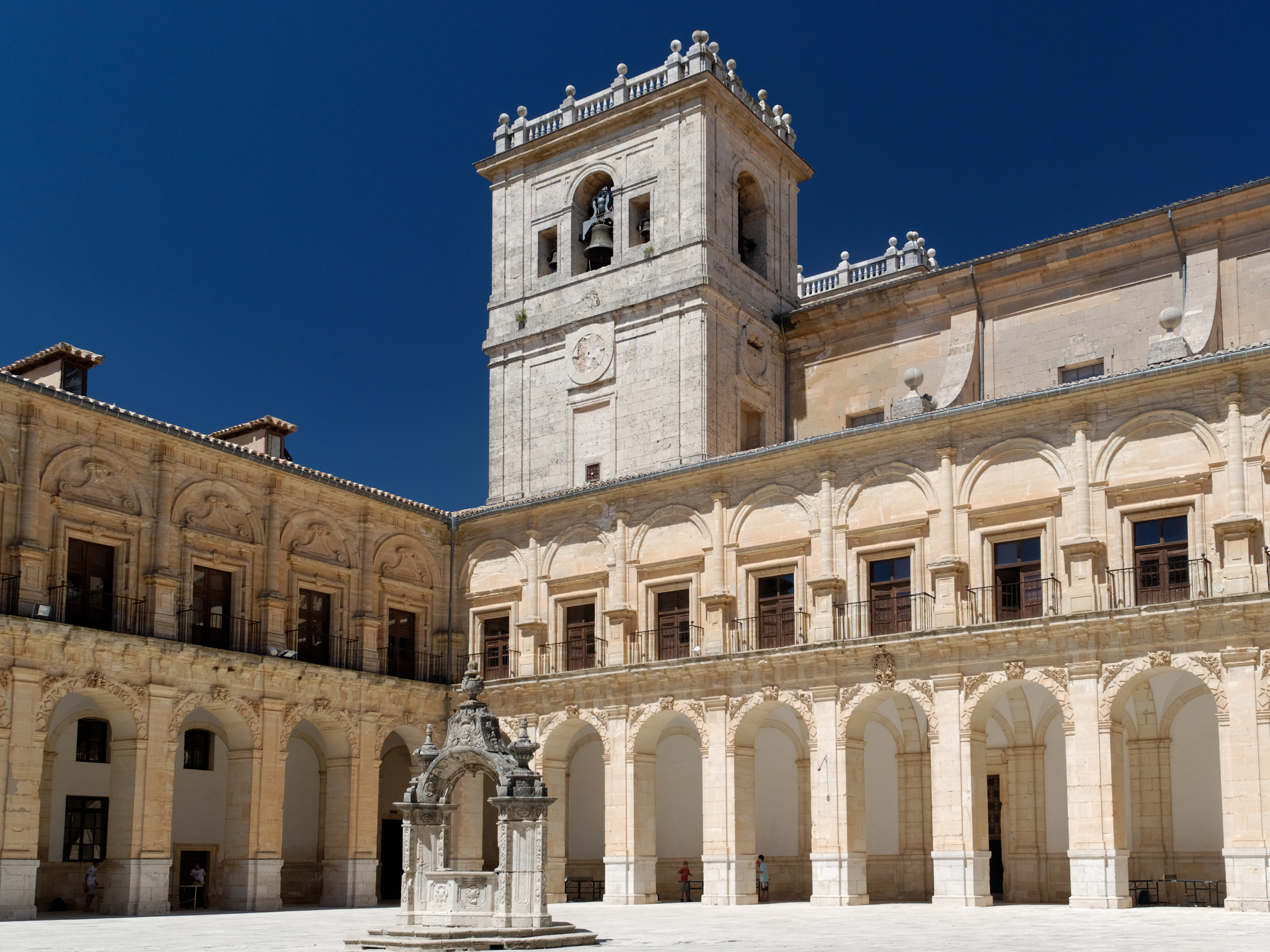
Monastery of Uclés. Seat of the Order of Santiago and the place where the original Fuero de Villasila and Villamelendro is preserved.

=== Middle Age ===
The first written mention of this town under the name of "Uilla Melendi", along with other neighbouring villages, takes place in 1175 in a manuscript volume belongs to the monastery of Santa María de Retuerta, where signs Domingo Iohannes, perhaps the parish priest of the village, as a witness to a donation of Fortun Moñoz of their inheritances in Cardeñosa, outright next to Villasila, for the benefit of the Arenillas de San Pelayo monastery, where it could have been written the same and which was subsidiary of Retuerta.

January 12, 1180, King Alfonso VIII gives jurisdiction both Villamelendro and Villasila in Carrión de los Condes, following the request made by the clergy of both villages.

On 19 December 1186, just six years after the privilege granted by Alfonso VIII, the regime of both villas is changed, happening Royal to behetria as Pedro Rodríguez de Castro is contained in a diploma of Alfonso VIII signed in Arevalo, as Lord of Villasila and Villamelendro. This Castilian ricohombre was son of Rodrigo Fernández de Castro "the bald" and was married to Urraca Rodríguez de Guzmán, with whom he had no offspring.

In 1189, Pedro Rodríguez de Castro, together with his spouse, gives for their souls to the order of Santiago Villamelendro along with Villasila village. The Commander of Uclés but Franco granted to donors in prestimonio for life with the condition that after his death remain in command of the Commander of Ucles.

==== From señorío to abadengo ====
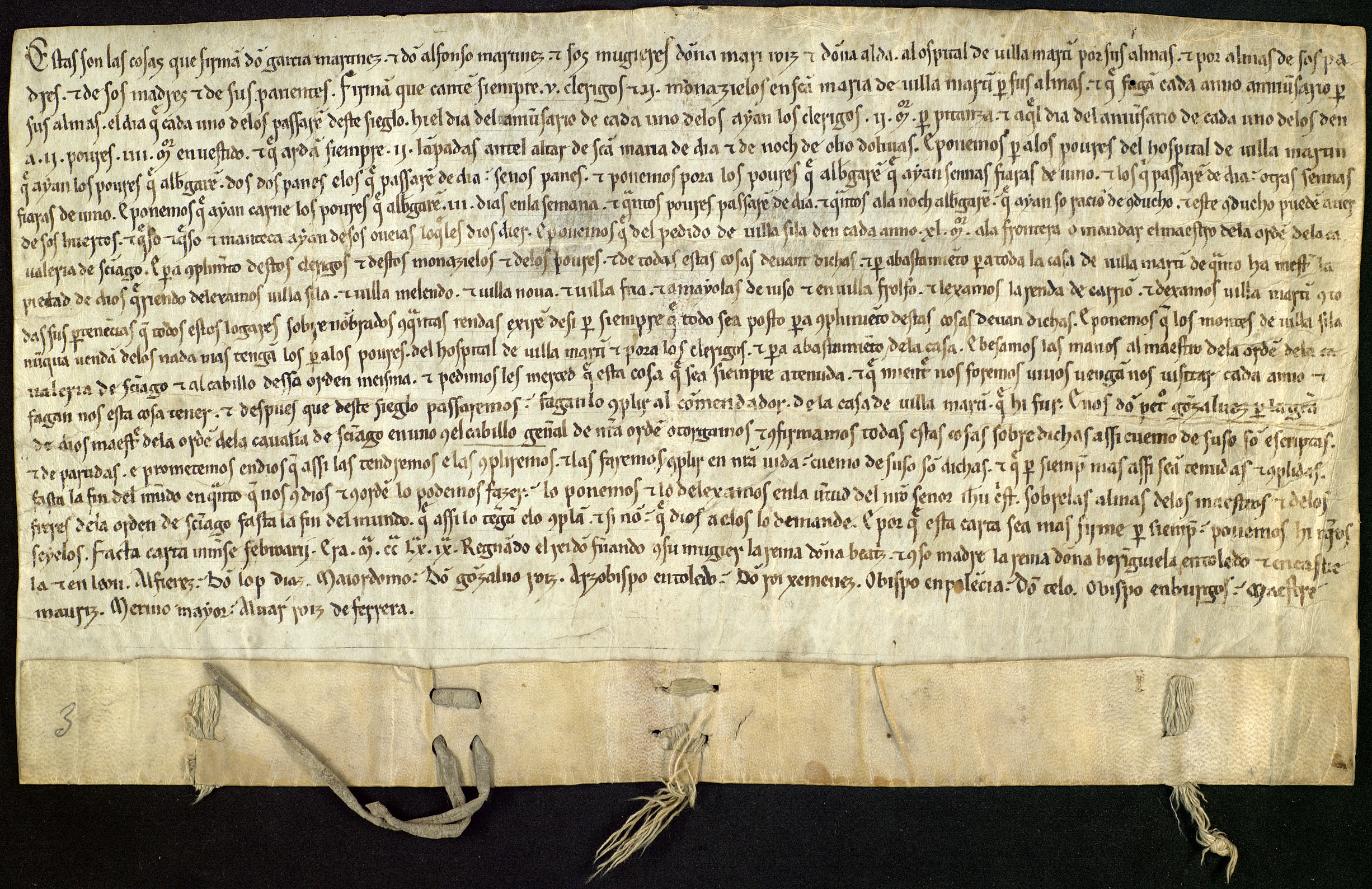
Anniversary founded by the Martínez brothers and their wives, giving as compensation their properties in Villasila, Villamelendro, Villanueva, Villafría, Amayuelas de Abajo and Villafolfo

After the death of the Lords, and as they left dictation in their agreement with the Uclés, Alfonso VIII runs the same being Alarcos of October 18, 1194, the final donation to the order of Santiago of the Alcazar de Alarcón, half of the portazgos of Alarcón and Alconchel, the village of Las Gascas, Villasila, Villamelendro and other inheritances. This donation is reiterated a month later, on November 24 in Toledo, where Alfonso VIII gives in addition to the order, half of the portazgo Alarcón and Valera of Roa, the villas of Villasila and Villamelendro but in this case, in Exchange for the castle of Alarcon the fifth part of the income of this village and the village of Las Gascas, convirtiendo ambas aldeas en villas de [[|abadengo]].

From this moment the future of both villas is marked by the activity of the hospitals of Las Tiendas and Villamartin (founded the latter for Tello Pérez de Meneses as well as of the San Nicolas del Real Camino), producing several annotations related to contributions earmarked for the maintenance of these sites, or even place names of Villamelendro as "Matafrades" or ("forest of the frates or brothers)," "Las Monjas" payment in Villasila, which may allude to the santiaguistas nuns of Santa Eufemia, or the moor of stores. Even reaching the confines with Villaeles where we find the Mount of Matalabad, or our Lady matte.

The first of these annotation's news, takes place July 8, 1212, in the documentation of the monastery santiaguista female of Santa Eufemia de Cozuelos, where the sons of don Gil de Villamorco, as sellers of land located in source John Vellidez to Diaz Roiz, Commander of fields and Villasila (and therefore of Villamelendro) to the order of Santiago.

In 1231, D. Alfonso Martínez and Don García Martínez, together with its wife Doña Mari Roiz and Doña Alda, founded in Villamartin Hospital an anniversary for his soul, his parents and relatives delivering its properties as compensation in Villasila, Villamelendro, Villanueva de Arriba, Villafría de la Peña, Amayuelas de Abajo and Villafolfo.

March 8, 1255, King Alfonso X of Castile ratified on Aguilar de Campoo, the privilege granted 75 years before, by his great-grandfather King Alfonso VIII.

October 19, 1328 Villamelendro appears again in the documentation of the said Monastery of Santa Eufemia de Cozuelos as part of a previous donation made June 15, 1327 on the part of the master of the order of Santiago Don Vasco Rodríguez de Coronado. It donates to María Gutiérrez, the Commander of Santa Eufemia, charged with Villasirga, Villamartin, Villamelendro, the place of Vega Santillan and Legones (Saldaña outright) for the maintenance of the same.

=== Modern Age ===
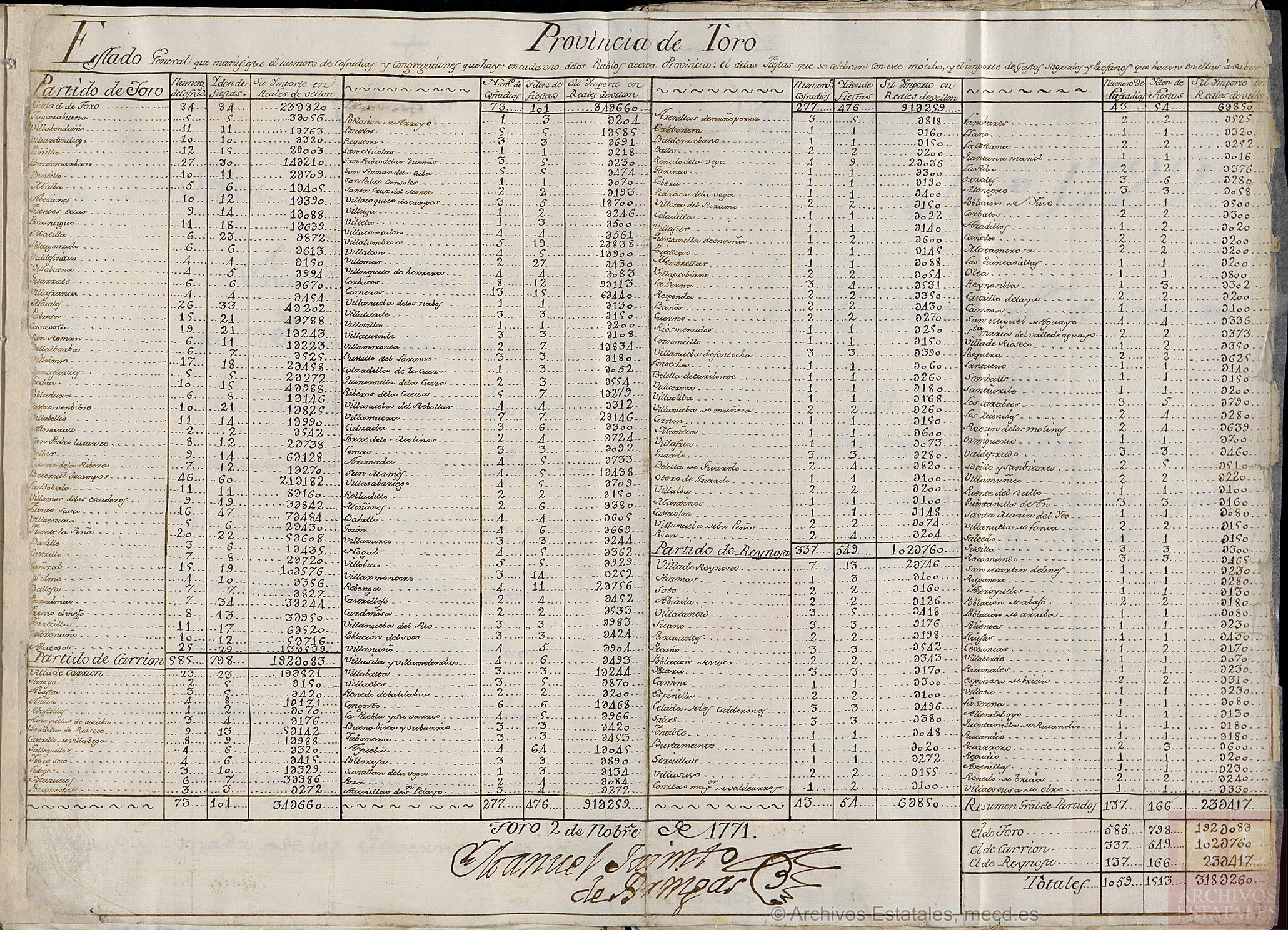
Record of referral of Manuel Jacinto de Bringas, intendant of the province of Toro to the Count of Aranda, of the state of the congregations, brotherhoods and brotherhoods that exist in the towns of the said jurisdiction. Year of issue 1770 / 1771. Villamelendro and Villasila appear in it with 4 Confraternities, 6 Festivals and a budget of 6493 reales de Vellón.

On 21 February in 1527, during the general chapter of the Order, which took place in Valladolid, and which was presided over by Charles V, began the examination of the books of visitations made in Castile by Lope Sánchez Becerra and Juan Alonso, priest of Montemolín, which detail a series of agreements regarding the possessions of the Order in this ecclesiastical province. Among them are those relating to the Hospital de las Tiendas and Villamartin, making reference to the need to pay for boxes of half a silver mark for the Blessed Sacrament, destined for Villasila and Villamelendro (one for each parish), as well as to find out if the rights that the Order may have had over an old well, lands and houses are still in force.

It is surprising to see that in 1528, Villamelendro had 29 pechero neighbours, i.e. neighbours obliged to attend to His Majesty's Services, which were taxes approved by the Cortes from which the Nobility and the Church were exempt, compared to the 22 in Villasila, as reflected in the Census of pecheros of Carlos I. This circumstance highlights the importance of the Camino Real de la Valdavia, to the detriment of the current road.

On 4 June 1537, Charles V himself, as perpetual administrator of the Order of Santiago, through his advisor Antonio de Luján resolves the petition of Antonio de Valderrábano in favour of the administrator of the hospital of Las Tiendas and Villasirga (formerly Villamartin), by which he requests a letter ratifying the privilege granted by Alfonso VIII first, which was confirmed by Alfonso X later. This letter is requested because the aforementioned administrator needs it as proof of a certain civil and criminal lawsuit that took place in Villasila and Villamelendro, the details of which we do not know.

In the 16th century, Villamelendro belonged to the Diocese of León, and was part of the Archdeaconry of Saldaña which included, among others, the Archpriesthood of Valdavia. It has 30 inhabitants and a baptismal font. The neighbour unit is comparable to that of a family with several members. In the same census, Villasila appears with 15 inhabitants, and Villaeles with 70. In the same census, the number of vassals in the Valdavia valley was 610 souls.

In 1631, in the salt census ordered by Felipe IV, Villasila and Villamelendro appear, with 80 inhabitants, divided into 227 over 10 years of age, and a surprising 88 under 10 years of age. This figure indicates an increase in the birth rate in both villages, due to the improvement in the economic and productive situation of the area.

In 1740, a judgement was issued in relation to a complaint filed by the mayor of Villaeles complaining that different subjects had built a riverbed and dam on land called El Canto abajo, located in the municipal district of Villaeles, disturbing the function of the dam in terms of irrigation and pastures, which by agreement between Villaeles, Villamelendro and Villasila, was ordered to be built in the municipal district of El Soto, and from where the current place name of El Cuérnago comes from.

In 1771, Manuel Jacinto de Bringas, intendant of the province of Toro, created a dossier of remission for the Count of Aranda detailing the state of the congregations, confraternities and brotherhoods that exist in the towns of this jurisdiction. This report includes Villasila and Villamelendro, with 4 confraternities, 6 Fiestas de guardar and 6493 reales de vellón provided for these celebrations for both sacred and profane expenses.

In 1789, Villasila and Villamelendro appear as villas realengas with an ordinary mayor in the province of Toro, judicial district of Carrión and the Valdavia Valley. Esta información es la que utiliza Antonio Vegas en 1795 para describir ambas villas en su Diccionario Geográfico Universal.

=== Contemporary Age ===
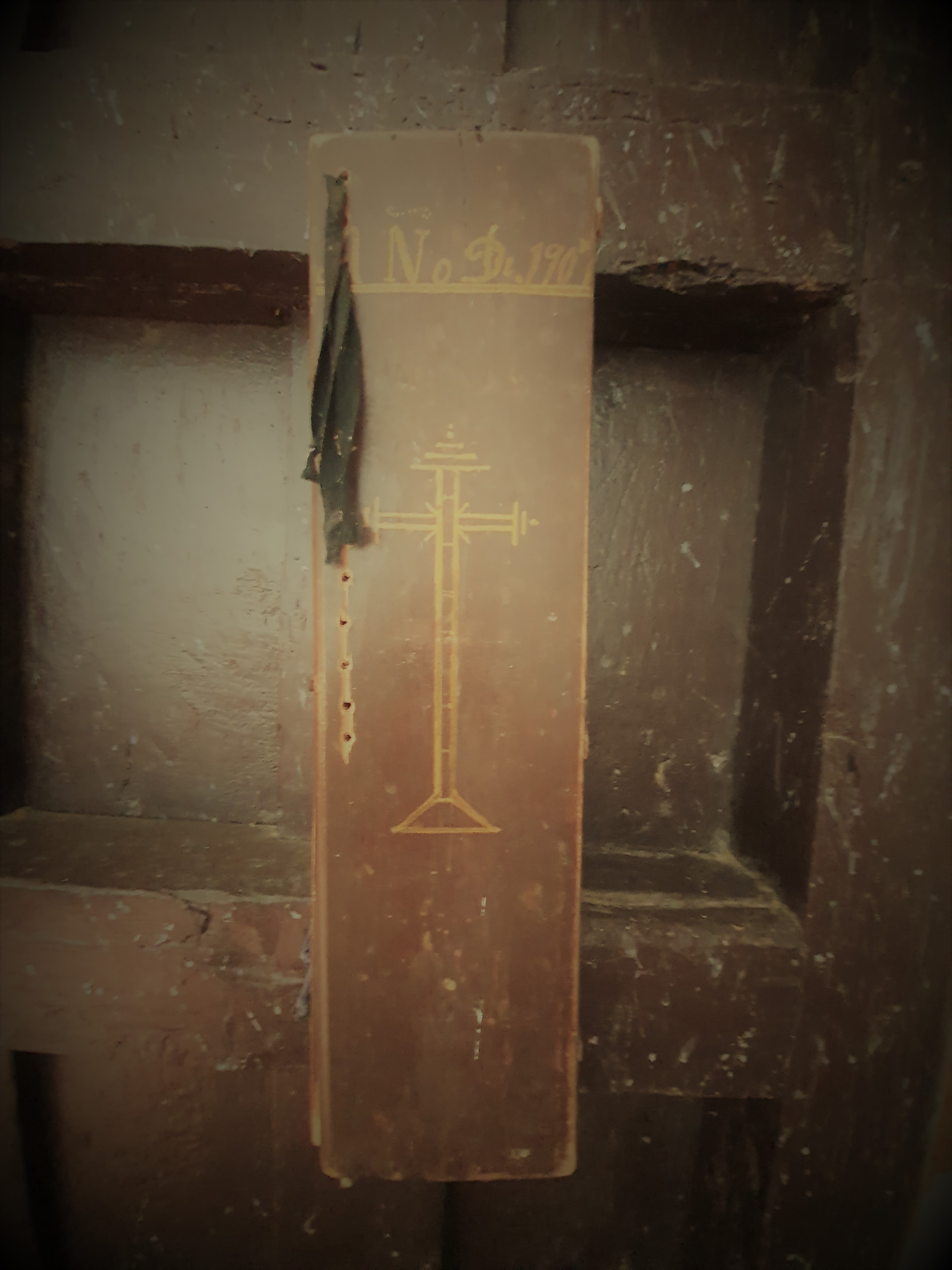
Book of members of the brotherhood of the Santísima Vera Cruz de Villamelendro. These are two tables in the form of a book with the names of the members of the brotherhood active at that time. Although the confraternity was founded in 1826, the table is from 1907 and lists members up to the middle of the 20th century.

In 1828, Doctor Sebastián Miñano, member of the Royal Academy of History and of the Geographical Society of Paris, in his Diccionario geográfico-estadístico de España y Portugal, gives the following description of both towns:

«VILLASILA and VILLAMELENDRO: Villas Realengas de España, province of Palencia, partido de Carrión. Alcalde ordinario, 97 inhabitants, 342 inhabitants, 1 parish church, 1 granary. Located on the banks of the river Valdavia. It borders to the north with Villaeles, to the east with Sotobañado and Calahorra, to the south with Arenillas de Nuño Pérez and Villanuño and to the west with Villota del Duque. It is surrounded to the west and north by a number of mountains. It produces grain, pasture, flax and livestock. It is 4 leagues from the head of the district. It contributes 2301 reales, 9 maravedíes. Rights sold 342 reales, 15 maravedíes.»

In 1829 it appears in the Nota de las cuotas de la Contribuction general, within the Partido de Carrión de los Condes, contributing 9615 reales de vellón, and its equivalent transfer of 4807 maravedís.

In 1834 with the new territorial division, it appears within the judicial district of Saldaña, which in its constitution has 108 villages, 4855 inhabitants and 20170 souls, which gives a ratio of 4.15 souls per neighbour.

In 1845, Pascual Madoz detailed in greater detail, in his Diccionario geográfico-estadístico-histórico de España y sus posesiones de Ultramar (Geographical-statistical-historical dictionary of Spain and its overseas possessions), the following:

«VILLASILA and VILLAMELENDRO two districts that form a town with a town council in the province of Palencia (11 leagues), judicial district of Saldaña (2 1/2) territorial audience and general corregimiento of Valladolid 19 diocese of León (15). Situated in the centre of a valley, the first in flat terrain and the other on a small hill, at a distance of 1/4 of an hour. Its CLIMATE is temperate, well ventilated and healthy. It consists of 90 poorly built houses; a primary school, attended by 27 boys and 11 girls and another in Villamelendro. Both have a fountain for the consumption of the neighbourhood; 2 parish churches (San Pelayo in Villasila and La Asunción in Villamelendro), both of which have an entrance and provision in patrimonial property. The hermitage of Santervás in the municipality of Villasila is highly venerated in these villages. The TERM is bordered to the north by Villaeles, to the east by San Martín and Revilla de Collazos, to the south by Arenillas de Nuño Pérez and to the west by Vega de Doña Olimpa. The LAND is of excellent quality and a good portion is irrigated. It is crossed by the Valdavia stream both to the east and west. It is covered with oak trees, rockroses and other shrubs. The ROADS are local and medium-sized. The CORRESPONDENCE is received from Saldaña. It produces wheat, rye, barley, oats, chickpeas, titos, yeros, flax, potatoes, turnips and others. It breeds sheep, cattle, horses, mules, hares, partridges and rabbits, and fishes trout, barbels, fish and crabs. AGRICULTURAL INDUSTRY and the production of linen; flour mills, one for each district, and an oil mill. TRADE: the sale of its products, the importation of oil, cod, rice and other articles. POPULATION: 45 inhabitants, 234 souls PRODUCTIVE CAPACITY: 77,040 reales, TAXES: 2508 reales, MUNICIPAL BUDGET amounts to 4,000 reales and is covered by the products of local distribution.»

== Toponymy ==
=== Hidronomy ===
Brooks
Boqueras, Aº. de las	Canalejas, Aº. de las	Cuérnago del Molino	Cuestamañana, Aº de	Franciscas, Aº. de las	Fuentemellada, Aº de
Huertas, Aº de las	Huerto Las Casas, Aº del	Lobas, Aº. de las	Majadillas, Aº. de las	Matafrades, Aº. De	Matazalce, Aº de
Orejo, Aº de	Quintanillas, Aº de las	Romilla, Aº de	Valdecabras, Aº de	Valdecirbano, Aº	Valdemadre, Aº de
Valdeodrés, Aº de

Fountains
Vega, Fuente de	Pueblo, Fuente del	Escuela, Fuente de la

Rivers
Valdavia, Río

=== Oronomy ===
Paths
Barriales, Cº de los	Campos, Cº de los	Fuentepedreña, Cº de	Itero Seco, Cº de	Landesa, Cº de	Otero Nombrado, Cº de
Palominas, Cº de las	Pepino, Cº de	Rigueras, Cº de las	S. Andrés, Cº de	Soto, Cº del	Sotobañado, Cº de
Camino de Dña. Olimpa, Cº	Villabasta, Cº. De	Villada, Cº de			

Mountains
Corrillo, 990m	Lobas, 990m	Morcorio, 986m	Picones, Los. 985m

Places
Argañales, Los	Arnillas, Las	Barciganillo	Camino de Villamelendro	Canalejas	Cañadillo, El
Corbejones, Los	Corrillo	Eras, Las	Espineras, Las	Fontecha, La	Franciscas, Las
Fuentemellada	Fuentepedreña	Hazas, Las	Hongares, Los	Huertas, Las	Huerto Las Casas
Landesa	Llanillos	Lobas, Las	Manrubial	Matafrades	Matazalce
Molino del Oleo	Olmos, Los	Orejo	Otero Nombrado	Pajariteros, Los	Palominas, Las
Payudos	Portilla, La	Quintana	Quintanas, Las	Rabas, Las	Ribero, El
Rigueras, Las	Romilla	Soto, El	Tras La Iglesia	Valdecirbano	Valdemadre
Valdeodrés

== Other references ==
- Bienvenidos a la web de Villamelendro de Valdavia.
- Website of the City-hall of Villasila de Valdavia.
