= Villasila de Valdavia =

Coordinates: 42°32′N 4°33′W

- municipality
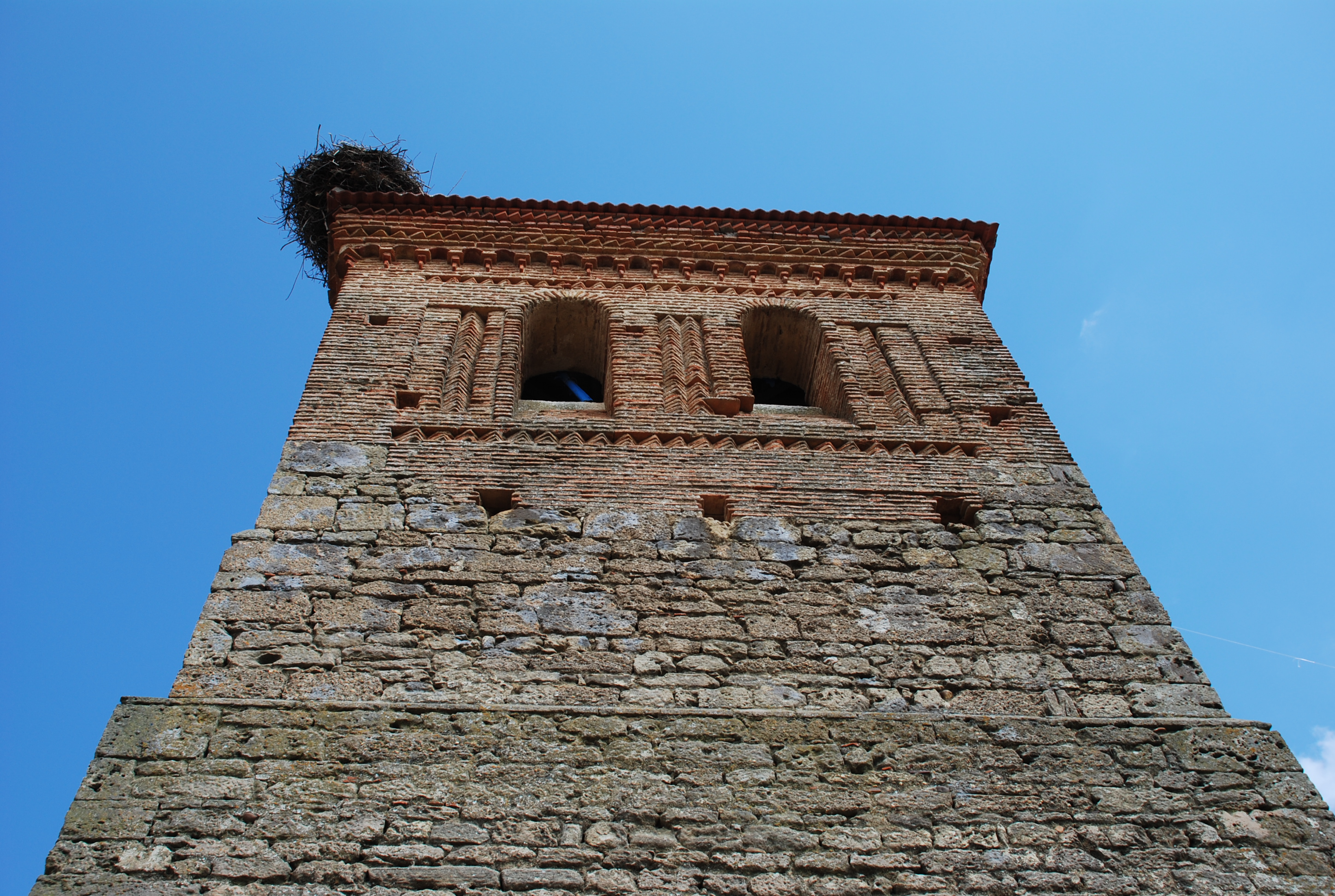

- Flag Coat of arms
- Interactive map of Villasila de Valdavia
- Country: Spain
- Autonomous community: Castile and León
- Province: Palencia
- Municipality: Villasila de Valdavia

Area
  - Total: 30 km^{2} (12 sq mi)

Population (2025-01-01)
  - Total: 64
  - Density: 2.1/km^{2} (5.5/sq mi)
- Time zone: UTC+1 (CET)
  - Summer (DST): UTC+2 (CEST)
- Website: Official website

Villasila de Valdavia is a municipality located in the province of Palencia, Castile and León, Spain. According to the 2022 census (INE), the municipality has a population of 64 inhabitants.

== Administrative division ==
Municipal area includes the neighbouring village of:

- Villamelendro de Valdavia.
