= Royal way of La Valdavia =

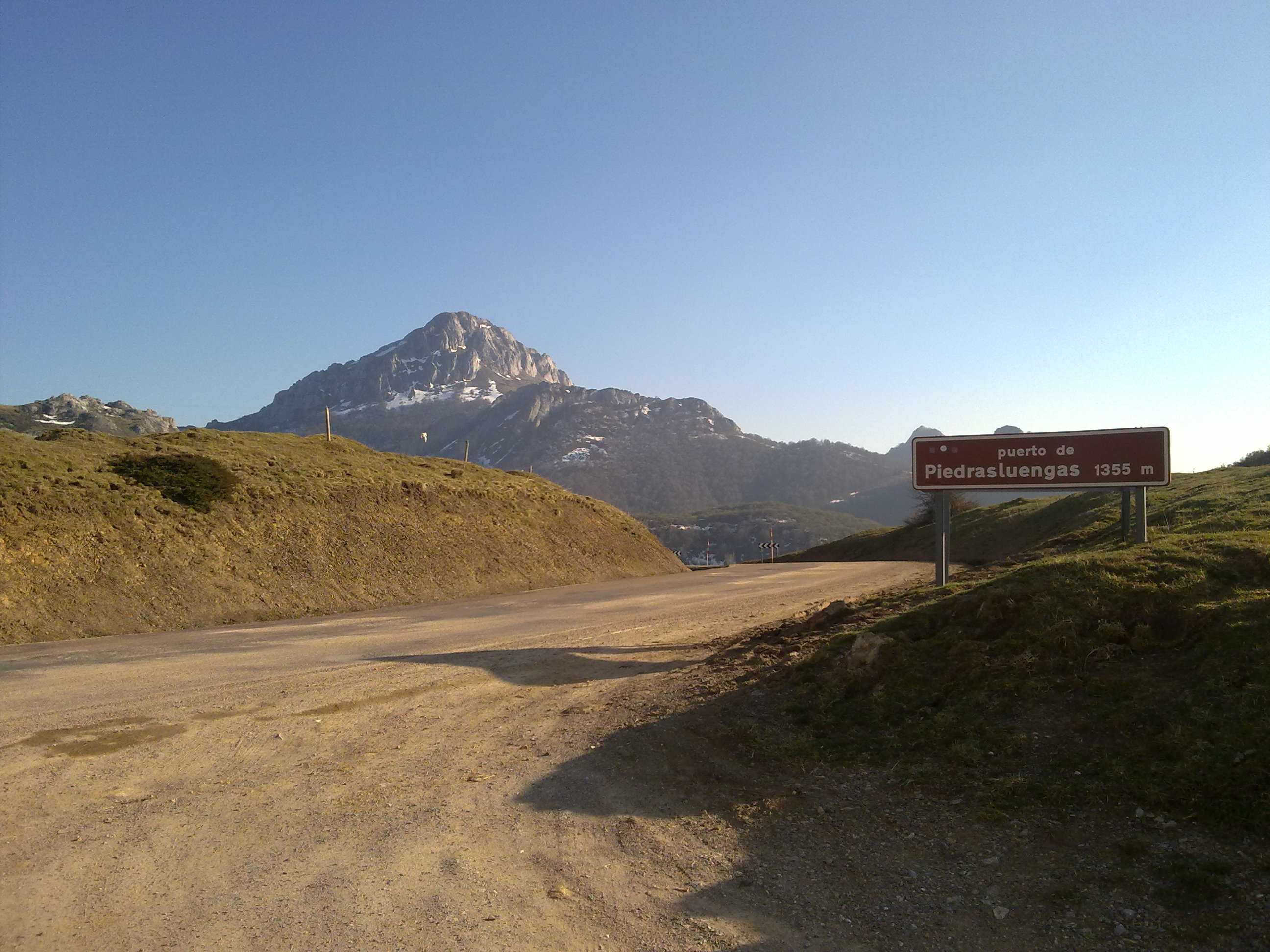
Pass of Piedrasluengas

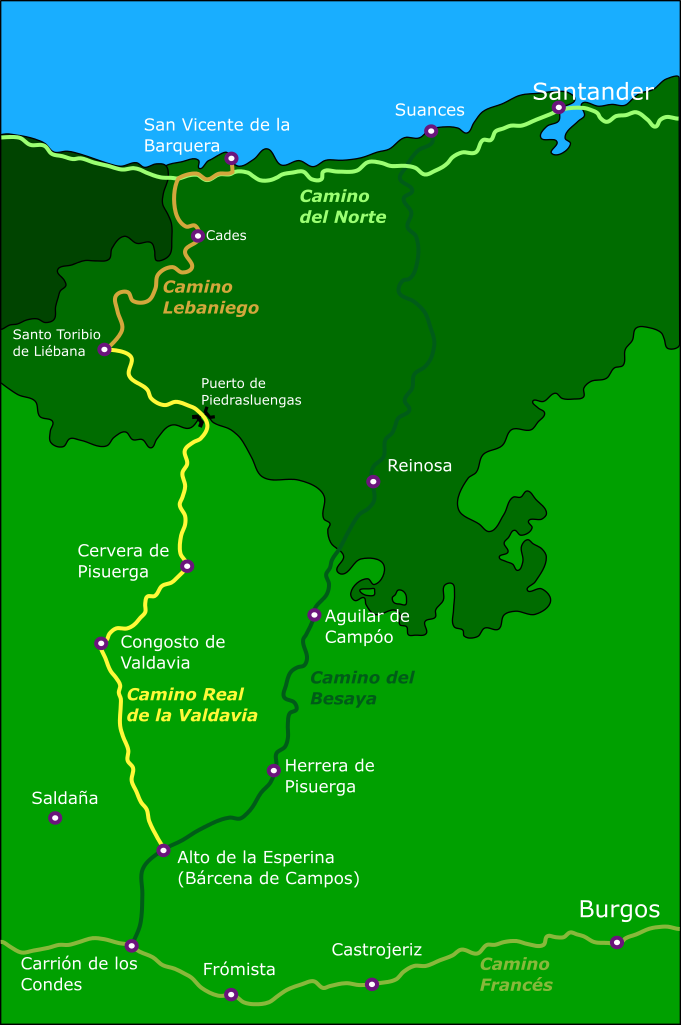
Royal Way of Valdavia and its relationship with the Lebaniego Way and the Besaya Route

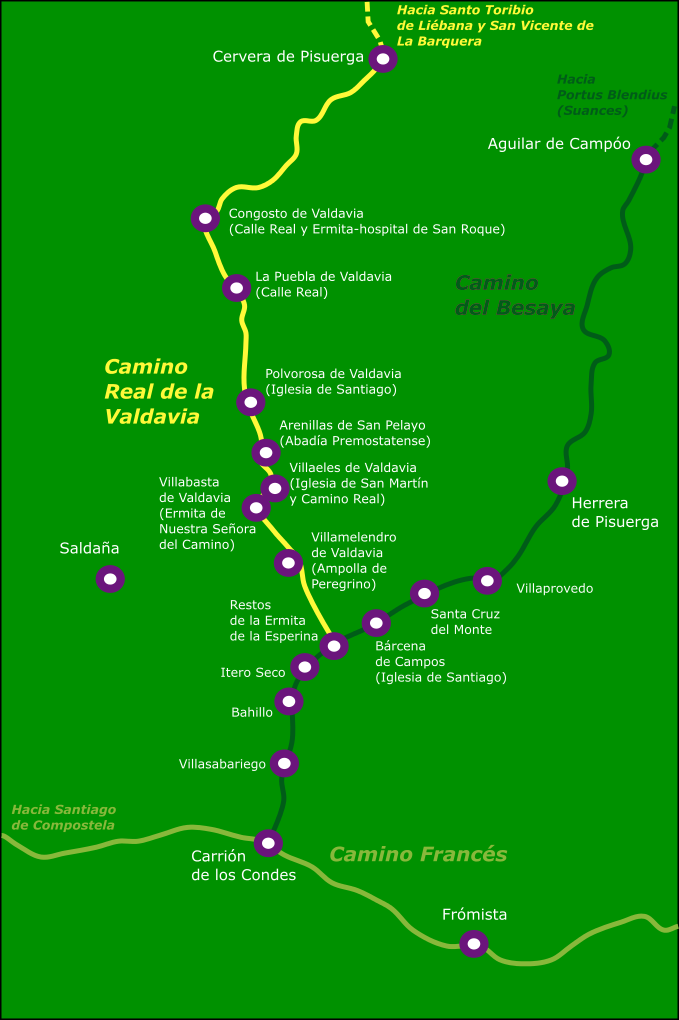
Royal Way of La Valdavia and its relation with the Camino Real de la Valdavia and the Route of El Besaya

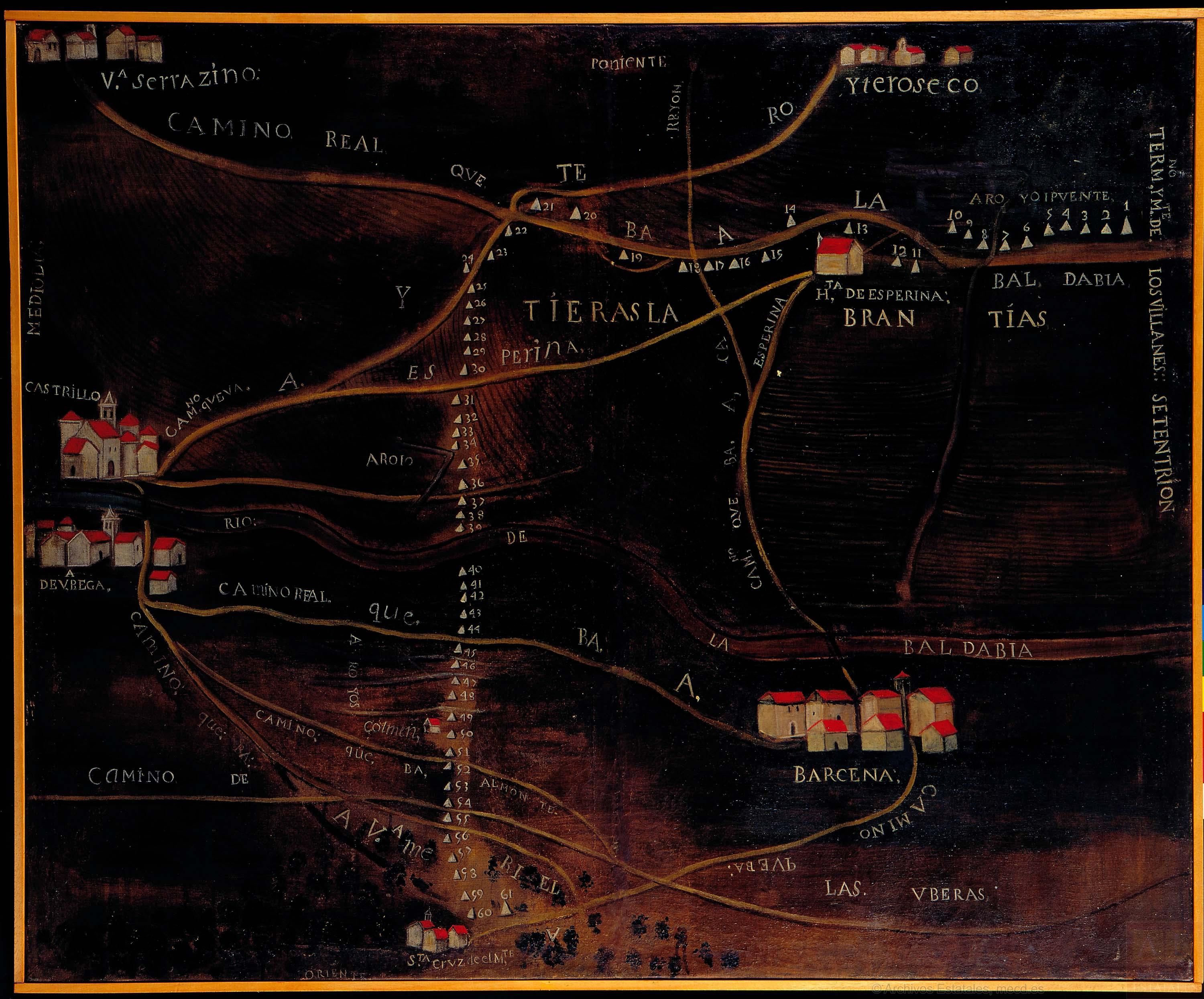
Oil map of the Camino Real de la Valdavia on its way through Bárcena and surroundings made in 1746.

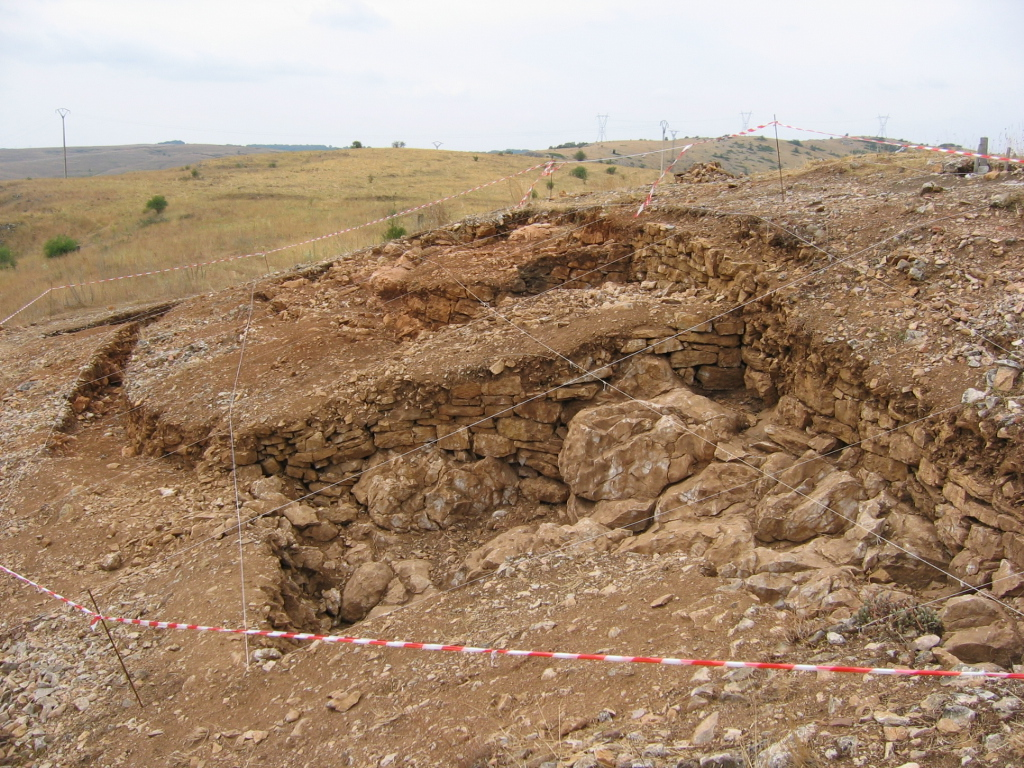
View of the bastion excavated in the 2007 campaign by Eduardo Peralta Labrador's team in the castro of La Loma, with evidence of siege by the Roman Legions

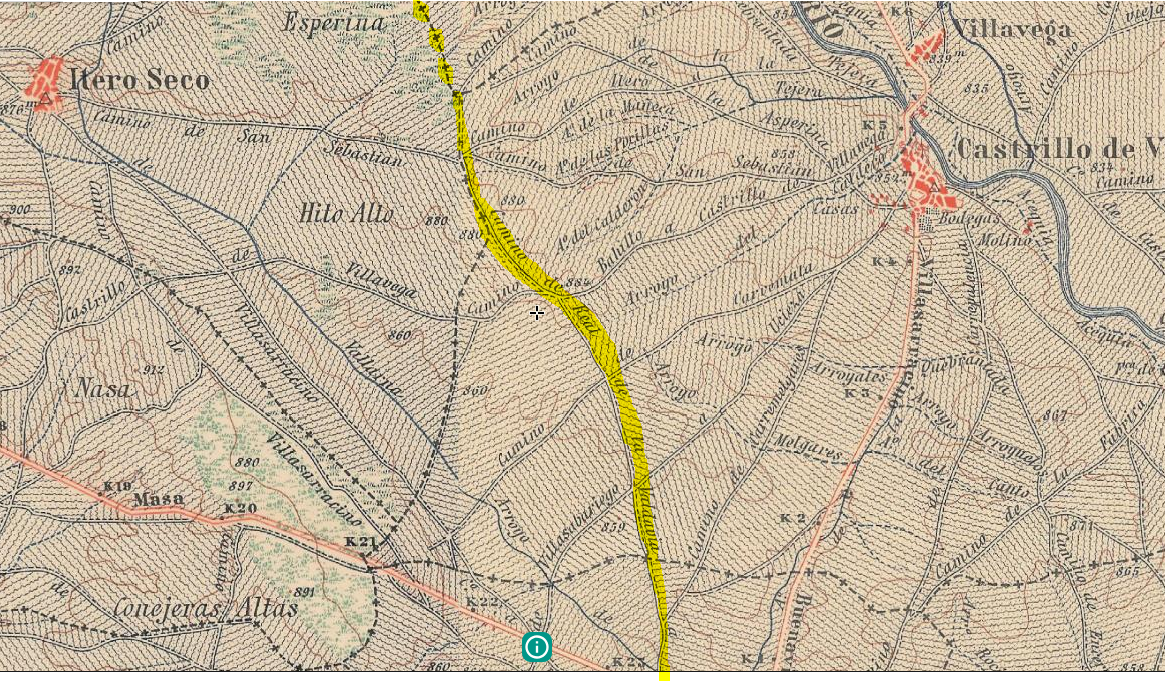
Camino Real de la Valdavia, from an army map made in 1929, where you can see how it happens to feet from the top of the Esperina projecting north.

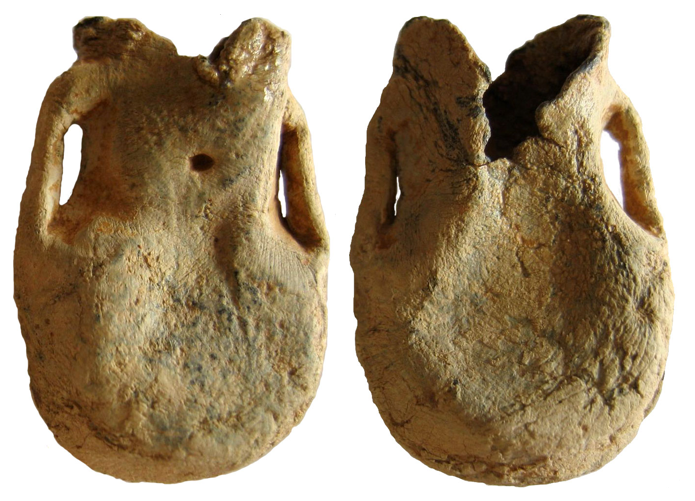
Pilgrim's ampulla found by chance on the Camino Real de la Valdavia on its way through Villamelendro de Valdavia

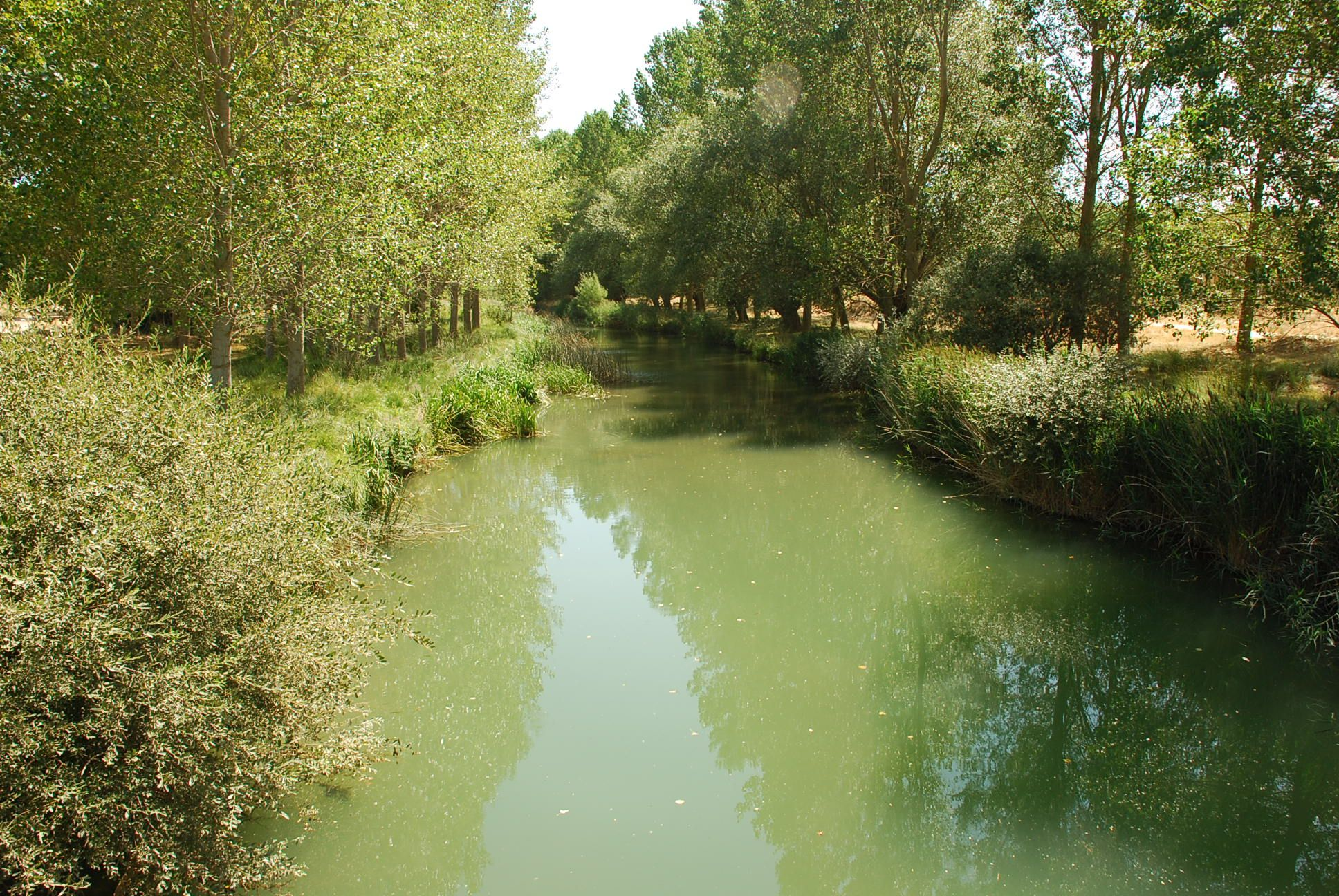
Río Valdavia a su paso por Polvorosa. A true axis on which the road is articulated.

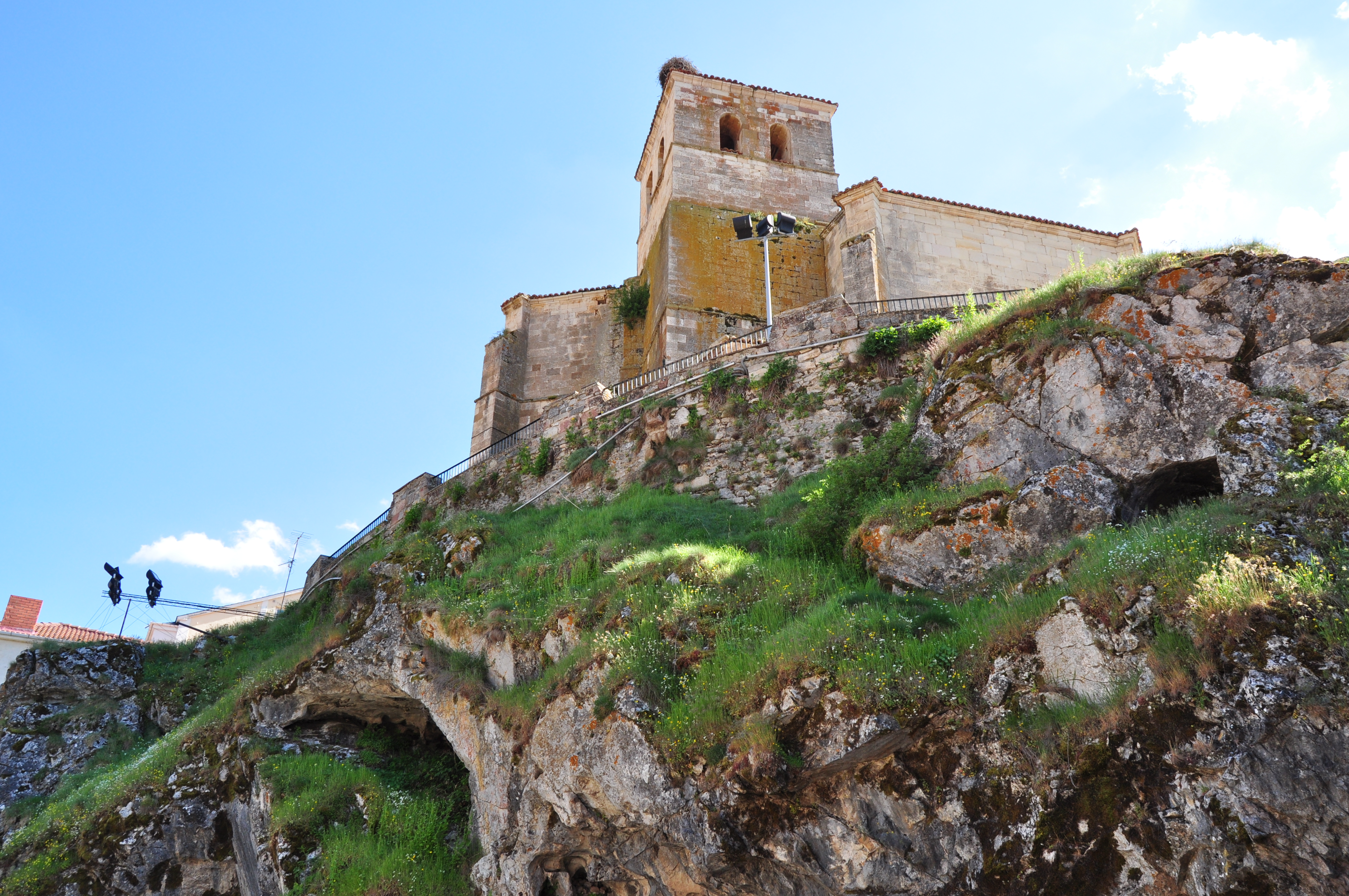
Church of the castle in Cervera de Pisuerga.

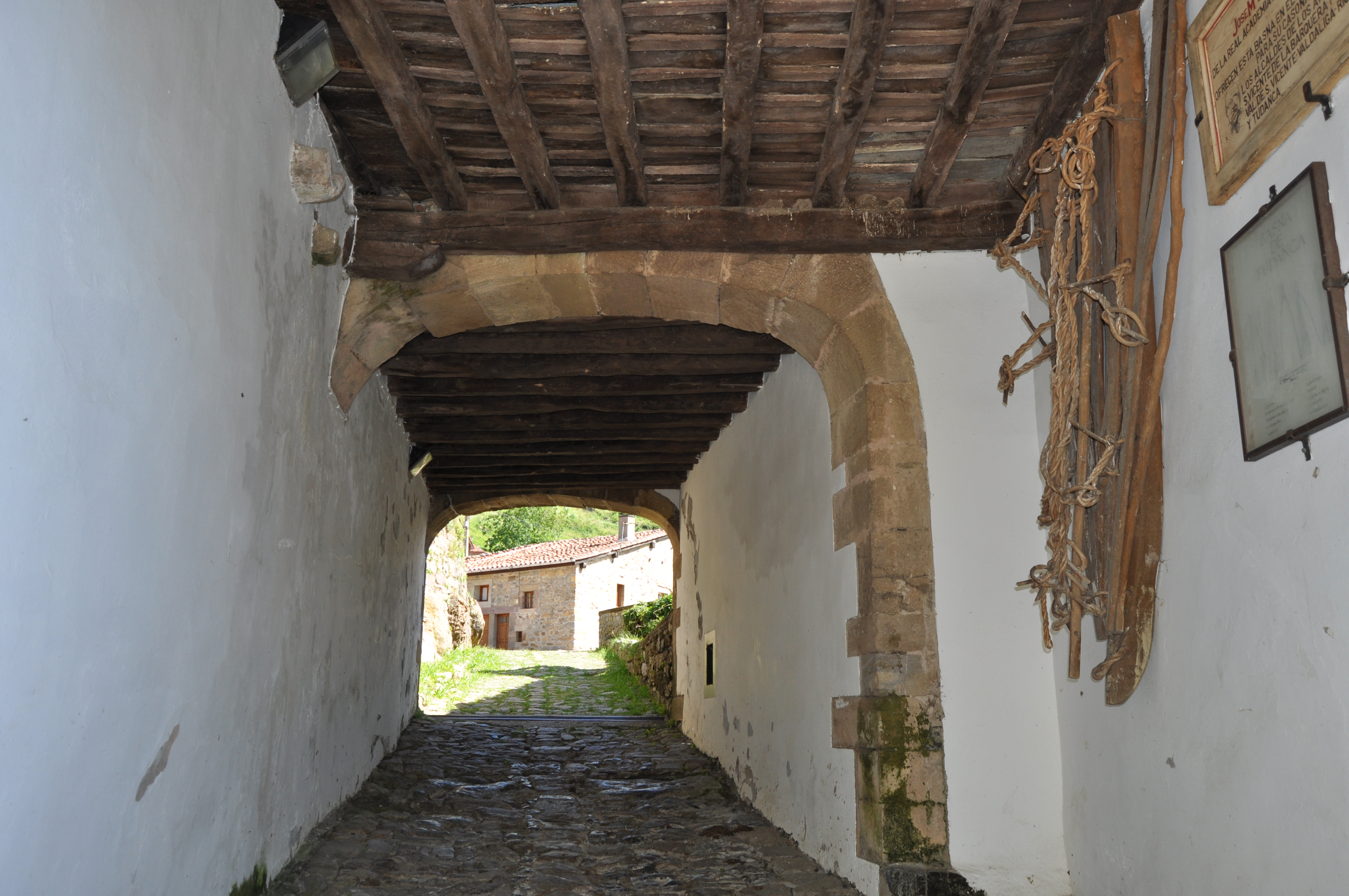
Manor house in Tudanca.

The Camino Real de la Valdavia (English translation Royal way of La Valdavia) is a historical route in Spain that joins the Way of St. James as it passes through Carrión de los Condes, with the Piedrasluengas pass through the valley of the Valdavia, and which was known and represented as such on maps until recent times.

In addition to the vía Vadiniense and the ruta del Besaya, the ancient Cantabrian people and the rest of the people who reached the northern coast by boat knew another way of communicating with the fertile Castilian Plateau. This is the Camino Real de la Valdavia. This route allows the devout traveller the opportunity to visit two of the most important Christian pilgrimage centres in Spain, the Santiago de Compostela Cathedral and the monastery of Santo Toribio de Liébana.

This route starts at the seaport of San Vicente de la Barquera and crosses the Piedrasluengas pass, entering the Valdavia valley parallel to the Valdavia River until it joins the Besaya route at the Alto de la Esperina near Carrión de los Condes.

This old road has several references that prove its antiquity and use. This is due to the fact that the aforementioned valley is the shortest and most accessible route from Carrión to the sea through the Piedrasluengas pass, which has allowed the movement of people and goods from Castile to the Cantabrian Sea since secular times.

== Historical references ==
Thus, in a 1230 landing of the monastery of Saint Zoilus in Carrión de los Condes about their possessions in Villasarracino, the race to Villaeles is already being talked about.

There is also news of this route in 1523 when Fernando Colón, son of Cristóbal Colón, published his Cosmografía with the most important routes of the time. Among these he details the one that goes from Toledo to San Vicente de la Barquera, 80 leagues long, where, after passing through the Province of Avila and the Province of Valladolid, it arrives to Palencia. It continues then through Becerril de Campos and Torre de los Molinos to Carrión and from there it goes to Bahillo, Villabasta, Polvorosa, La Puebla and Cervera. From here it reached San Vicente through Tudanca.

In 1746, this royal road is represented in detail as it passes through the town of Bárcena de Campos as a result of a lawsuit between the Council of Castrillo de Villavega and the Council of Bárcena over the jurisdiction of the territory in which the chapel of Nuestra Señora de Esperina was located. Here we can see how the Camino Real de la Valdavia passes at the foot of the aforementioned chapel, projecting towards two uninhabited areas of the current Villanuño de Valdavia called Villán de Suso and Villán de Yuso.

Still in the map of the Army of 1929, there was the reference of the Camino Real de la Valdavia leaving from Villasarracino towards North. Even today at the exit of Villaeles, towards Congosto, there is a road called Camino Real, which becomes Calle Real as it passes through both La Puebla and Congosto.

== Roadmap ==
The royal road of Valdavia itself would go from Congosto to Villasarracino. However, if we talk about the Jacobean route that makes use of it and links San Vicente de la Barquera with Carrión, we can trace the following route. From north to south the route would start from the seaport of San Vicente in the direction of either Potes by the Hermida Gorge, which is known as the Liébana route, or by the route of the old Roman road, known as Via II2, which going up by the Nansa would reach Tudanca.

Both routes would converge in the ascent on its north side to the Piedraslenguas pass, from where it would go into La Pernía Palencia, passing through San Cebrián de Mudá and arriving at Cervera de Pisuerga. There it would go towards Cantoral de la Peña, where it would cross the headwaters of the Boedo river leaving it behind, continuing until Roscales de la Peña, to get to Congosto de Valdavia to the height of the old Venta del Cuerno.

At this point it would go along the left bank of the river Valdavia for what is still known as the royal road (to the point that the main streets of Congosto and La Puebla receive the significant name of Calle Real). This route takes advantage of the route of the old Via III which went up the left bank of the Valdavia and which linked Clunia, Castrojeriz, Potes, reaching the sea. Arriving at Buenavista, it would continue through Polvorosa de Valdavia where the Church of Santiago is located, Renedo de Valdavia, Arenillas de San Pelayo with its magnificent Monastery Premostratense and Villaeles with its church of San Martín de Tours, a French saint of marked Jacobean tradition.

In Villaeles he would cross the river to Villabasta where the Chapel of the Virgin of the Way was located, now disappeared, but whose image is still venerated in its parish to continue towards Villamelendro. It is built around the Calle Mayor and gives it its characteristic elongated shape around the road. From Villamelendro it would leave by the camino de las arnillas towards the Villanuño's Villanes. On the banks of this path a medieval lead pilgrim's ampoule was found by chance in 2006.

Once past Los Villanes, he would reach the foothills of the Esperina, where there was a hermitage erected at the end of silo XII by the Countess Doña Mayor de Lara widow of the Count Fernando Núñez de Lara. There it would join the route of the Besaya, which would explain the said foundation being a strategic communications knot, in the direction of Itero Seco, Bahillo and finally Carrión de los Condes where it would connect in turn with the French route.

== Heritage of the route ==
Like the two other routes mentioned, this route offers a remarkable variety of landscapes and culture as it is the link between the ports of the Cantabrian Sea and the Castilian Plateau. This route is the shortest way for those pilgrims who will pass to worship the Lignum Crucis to continue towards Santiago de Compostela by the French Way. The orography of the Valdavia valley itself is a natural and accessible way of penetrating the valley.

The present route of this historic road coincides in part with the ancient Roman road known as Via III. Thus, in Castro de la Loma we can see the encirclement and destruction of a large Cantabrian civitas, which is why we speculate that the Valdavia was one of the incursion routes from the barracks established by Octavio Augusto in Sasamón. But this is not the only Roman vestige, remains of vici appear along the Valdavia, testifying to the human presence from remote times in this area.

Outstanding are the Romanesque monuments of the first order that mark the way, such as the Lebanza Abbey and its famous capitals conserved in the Fogg Art Museum in Boston, the collegiate church of San Salvador, the Romanesque church of the caserío de Tablares or the monasterio premostatense de San Pelayo.

== See also ==
- Camino de Santiago (route descriptions)
- Confraternity of Saint James
- Cross of Saint James
- Order of Santiago
- Palatine Ways of St. James
- Via Jacobi
- Pass of Piedrasluengas
