= Arenillas de San Pelayo =

Coordinates: 42°34′54″N 4°35′40″W

Arenillas de San Pelayo is a district of the municipality of Buenavista de Valdavia in the Province of Palencia, autonomous community Castile and León, Spain.

== Location ==
Arenillas de San Pelayo is 79,9 km N from the province's capital, Palencia. It is located in the Valdavia valley, in the center-north of the province. The population nucleus is located at an altitude of 895 meters. It is 20 km to the east of the regional capital, Saldaña, Palencia and 6 km to the north from the capital of the municipality, Buenavista de Valdavia.

The nucleus of Arenillas de San Pelayo occupies the south of the municipality of Buenavista. It limits to the South with Villaeles de Valdavia and Villabasta de Valdavia. It limits to the West with Valles de Valdavia and to the East with Revilla de Collazos. To the North it limits with the neighboring town of Renedo de Valdavia, also part of the Buenavista municipality.

== Communications and transportation ==
On the west side of the town, the P-237 provincial highway connects the towns of Villasarracino and Buenavista de Valdavia. It's a road completely renovated and paved in late 2006.
