= Valdavia River =

River in Spain

Valdavia river
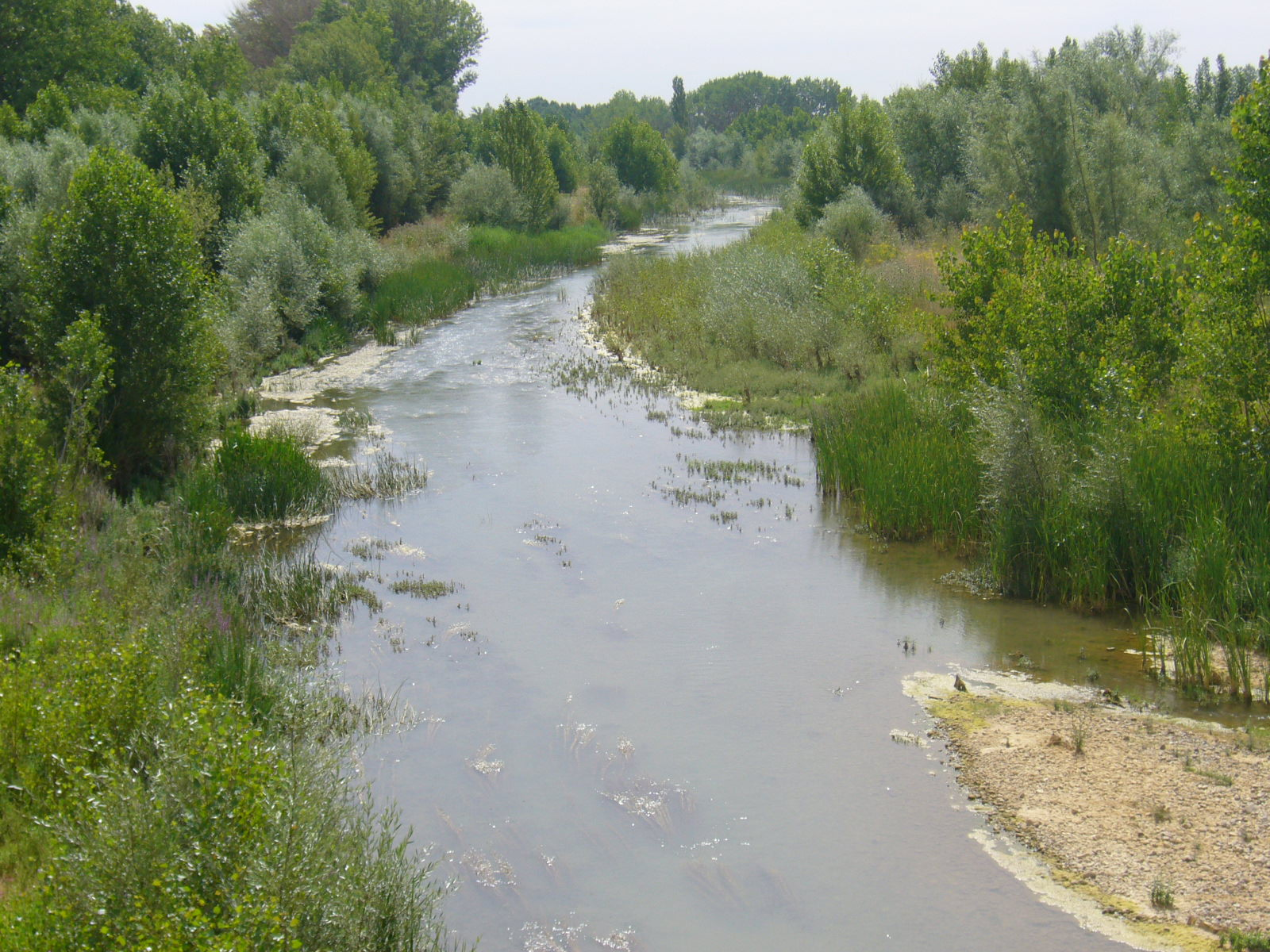
- Valdavia river in Osorno La Mayor (Province of Palencia).
- Native name: Río Valdavia (Spanish)

Location
- Country: Spain
- Region: Castile and León Province of Palencia, Province of Burgos

Physical characteristics
- Source
  - elevation: 1,242 m (4,075 ft)
- Mouth
  - coordinates: 42°23′29″N 4°16′30″W
- Length: 71 km (44 mi)
- Discharge
  - average: 76 m^{3}/s (2,700 cu ft/s)

The Valdavia River is a Spanish river that rises in the foothills of the Sierra del Brezo (Monastery of San Roman) in Santibáñez de la Peña; it passes through the valle de la Valdavia, to which it gives its name, through villages such as Congosto de Valdavia, Buenavista de Valdavia, Villaeles de Valdavia and Castrillo de Villavega; receives the waters of the Río Boedo in Osorno; and enters the province of Burgos to flow into the Pisuerga next to Melgar de Fernamental. This last section that goes from the mouth of the Boedo to its junction with the Pisuerga, is called Abánades River.

== Etymology ==
Its name is made up of the words "valle" and "avia" or "abia" which appears in the province of Palencia under the name of Abia de las Torres. The term "abia" or "avia" is also found in other rivers such as the Avión, a tributary of the Valdavia.

"Abia" or "avia" seems to be a pre-Roman toponym.

== See also ==
- County of La Valdavia
