= Bárcena de Campos =

Coordinates: 42°29′N 4°30′W

- municipality
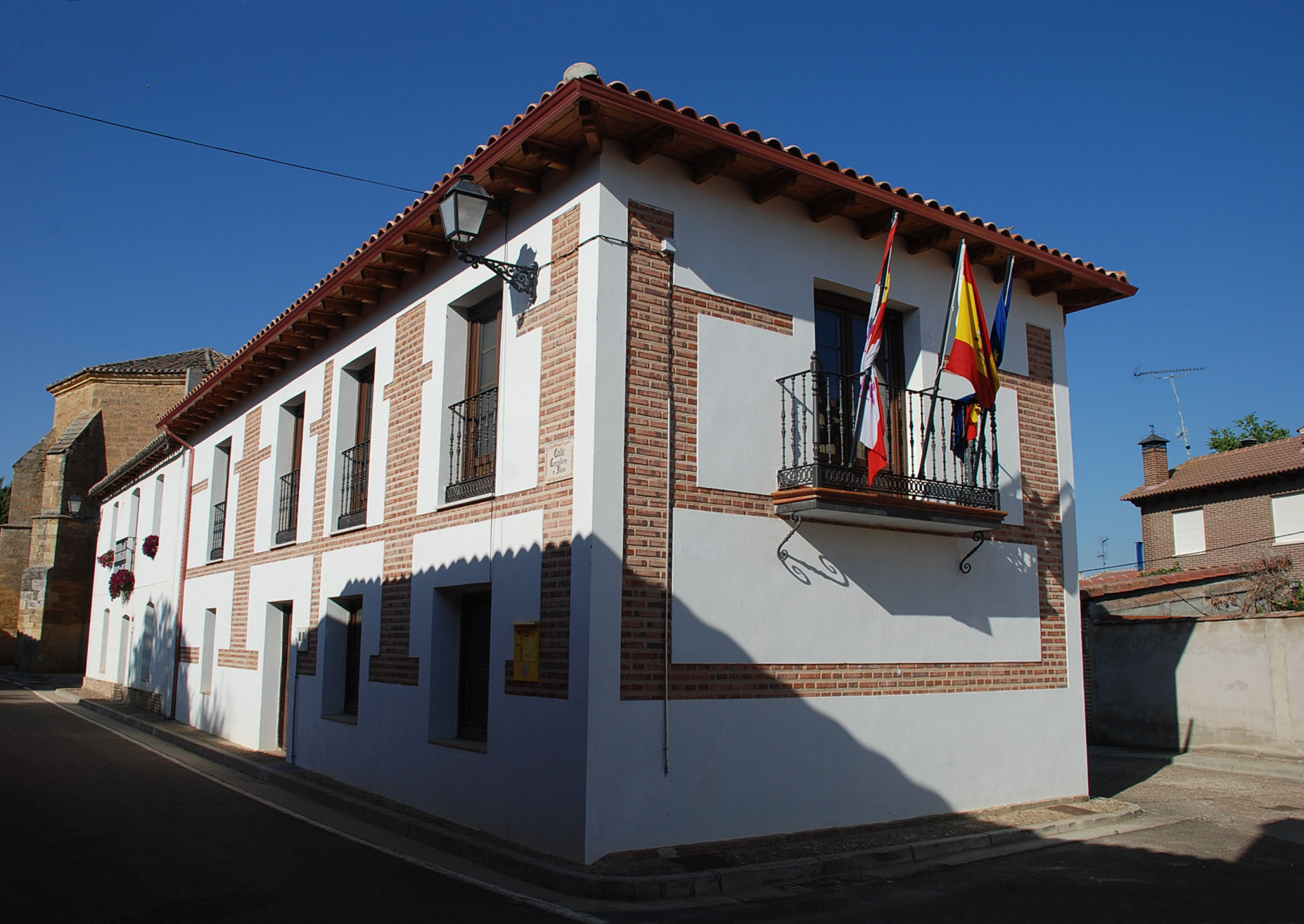
- Interactive map of Bárcena de Campos
- Country: Spain
- Autonomous community: Castile and León
- Province: Palencia
- Municipality: Bárcena de Campos

Area
  - Total: 14 km^{2} (5.4 sq mi)

Population (2025-01-01)
  - Total: 53
  - Density: 3.8/km^{2} (9.8/sq mi)
- Time zone: UTC+1 (CET)
  - Summer (DST): UTC+2 (CEST)
- Website: Official website

Bárcena de Campos is a municipality located in the province of Palencia, Castile and León, Spain. According to the 2004 census (INE), the municipality had a population of 59 inhabitants.

Bárcena is about 22 km north of the Camino de Santiago. It is located on the right bank of the Valdavia River. It limits to the north with Villanuño de Valdavia, to the east with Santa Cruz del Monte, to the south with Villavega, and to the west with Itero Seco. A town with a marked Jacobean character since at the foot of the Alto de la Esperina the Besaya route, coming from Suances, meets the Camino Real de la Valdavia route that linked San Vicente de la Barquera with Carrión de los Condes.
