= Pass of Piedrasluengas =

Mountain pass between Palencia and Cantabria, Spain

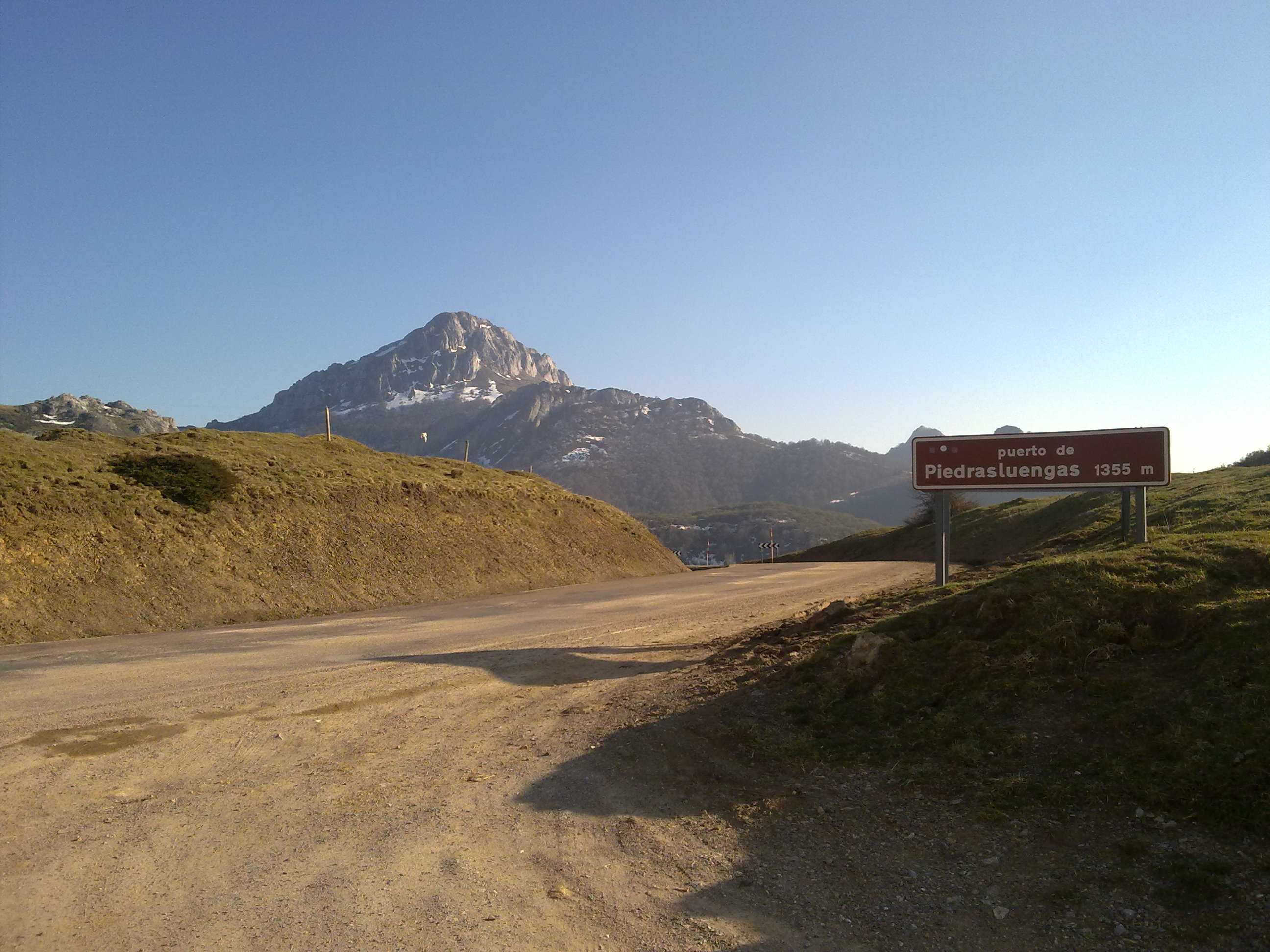
- Top of the pass, in the direction of Potes-Cervera de Pisuerga. Location between Cantabria and Palencia
- Interactive map of Pass of Piedrasluengas
- Elevation: Cantabrian Mountains

Third Approach
- Location: Spain; Piedrasluengas, Cantabria; Castile and León
- Coordinates: 43.0412°N 4.4582°W
- Road CA-184 - CL-627, Cabezón de Liébana - Piedrasluengas

The pass of Piedrasluengas, at 1.355 m, is a mountain pass between the province of Palencia and Cantabria (Spain), which crosses the Cantabrian mountain range, linking the Palencian town of Cervera de Pisuerga with the Cantabrian town of Potes, in the Liébana region. From the high part of the pass there is also a road that heads towards the Cantabrian valley of Polaciones. The pass reaches a maximum altitude of 1,390 m above sea level, via the road known as CL-627 for Castile and León and CA-184 for Cantabria.

== Etymology ==
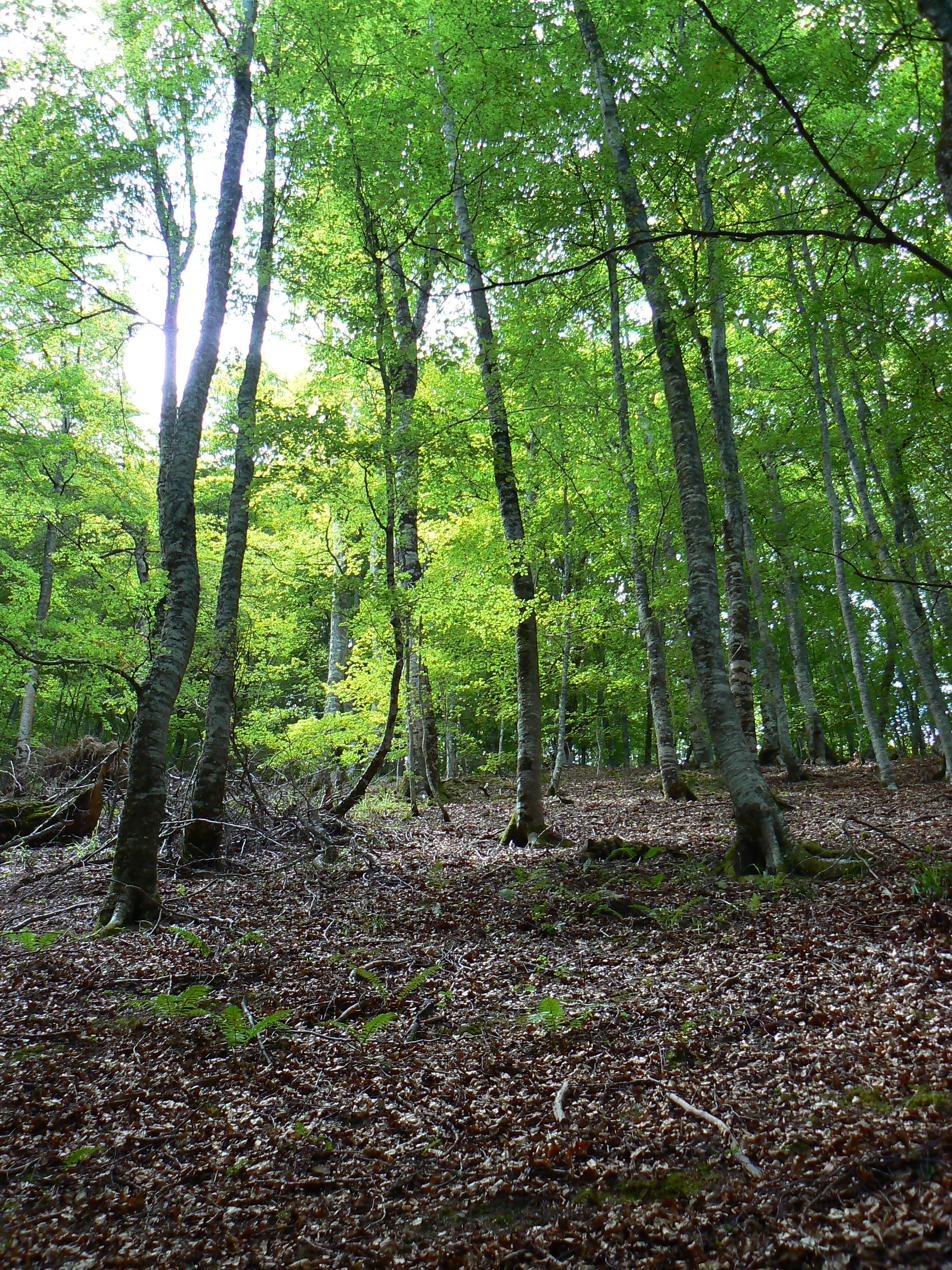
Beech forest in the foothills of the pass of Piedrasluengas.

The unusual adjective ‘luengo’ comes from the Latin longus, which means ‘vast’ or ‘large’, so the meaning of the toponym is ‘pass of large stones’. In any case, the toponym comes from the nearby Palencia hamlet of the same name (Piedrasluengas); and indeed, next to it, some large stones that form curious shapes are very striking.

== History ==
Its route gives rise to two ancient routes such as the old Roman road that evolved into the Royal Way of La Valdavia and the Roman road of Burejo, which also left from Pisoraca and crossed the Cantabrian mountain range through this pass. The valley formed by the river Bullón serves as a natural pass through the mountains, and a large part of the route runs parallel to it. Some studies maintain that this pass was used by one of the three columns of the Roman Empire that carried out the definitive campaign against the Cantabri, proof of which is the siege at the head of La Valdavia of Castro de la Loma.

== Location ==
From south to north, although the ascent itself does not begin until a few km. further on, it is usually considered to begin in Cervera de Pisuerga (Palencia), at 1005 m a.s.l. along the CL-627 road, reaching its maximum altitude at 1390 m a.s.l., exactly at point 43°02′45″N 4°27′05″W, and ends a few km. before the Cantabrian village of Potes, at 291 m a.s.l., after covering 56.2 km.

== Description of the route ==
Of the 40.8 km of the pass itself, 15.3 km are on the Palencia side and 25.5 km on the Cantabrian side. It starts, from S to N, in San Salvador de Cantamuda, at 1100 m above sea level, crossing the Palencia towns of Areños, Camasobres and Piedrasluengas, and the Cantabrian towns of Valdeprado, Pesaguero, Puente Asnil, Cabezón de Liébana and Frama, to reach Ojedo, at 300 m above sea level. The Palencia part of the route has a difference in altitude of 290 m and the Cantabrian part a difference in altitude of 1090 m. The top of the pass is in the province of Palencia, a few kilometres from the provincial border.

== Characteristics ==
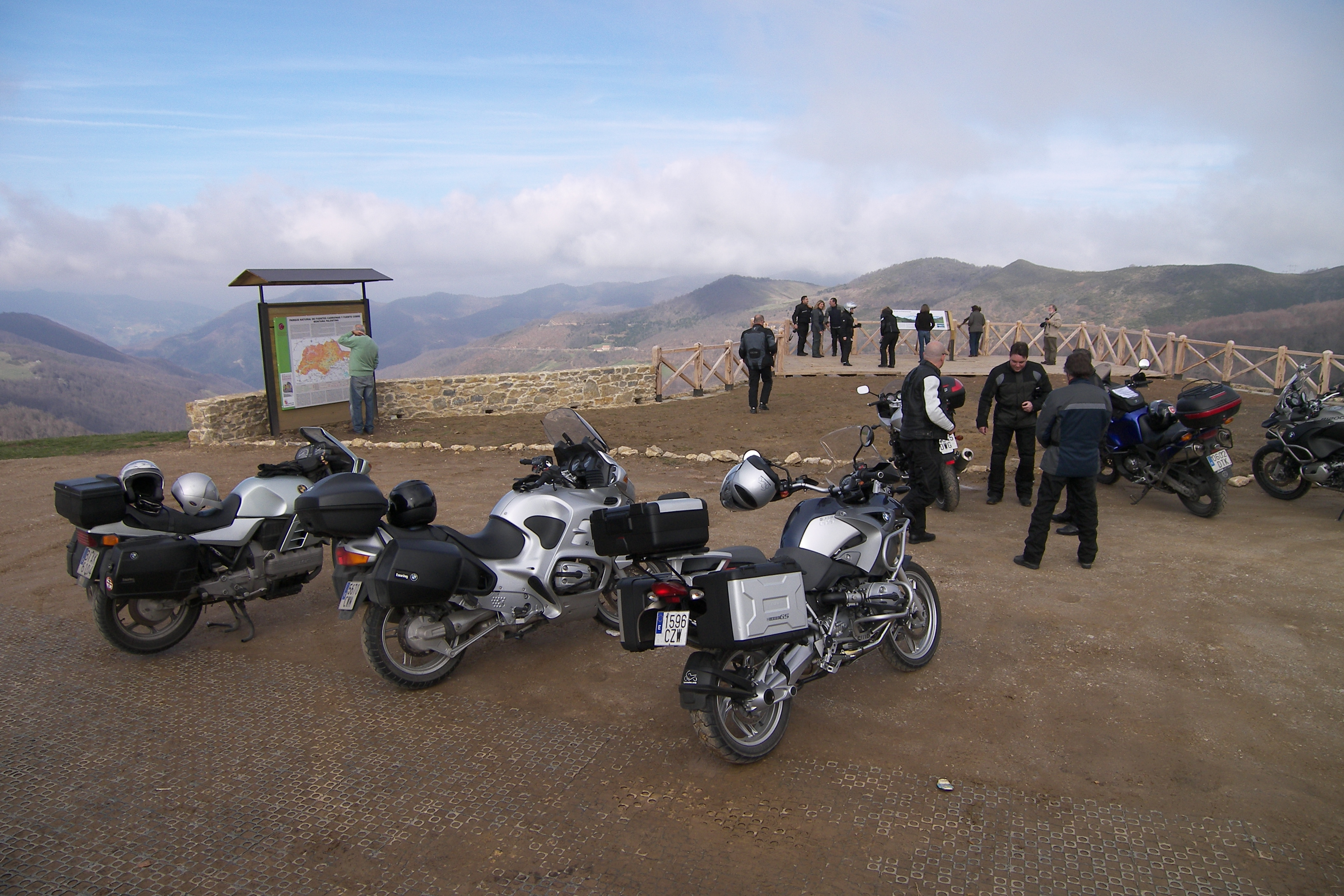
Viewpoint, located at the top of the pass, and panoramic view of the Liébana Valley.

- The Piedrasluengas pass is, together with the Cantabria-Meseta motorway, the most important road crossing between Cantabria and Palencia, which, despite being two neighbouring provinces, are divided by the Cantabrian mountain range.
- The fact that it crosses the Cantabrian mountain range (it is located within the Montaña Palentina Natural Park) means that this pass has significant views; next to the village of the same name (the village of Piedrasluengas is the most northerly in the province of Palencia) there is a wooden viewpoint from which to appreciate the nearby peaks: Peña Labra, Cuchillón and Pico Tres Mares, and the whole of the Liébana Valley.
- The pastures next to the pass are home to the Piedrasluengas blue viburnum, a plant included in the Catalogue of Threatened Flora, and which is endemic to the area.
- Preserved beech forests in Cantabria.

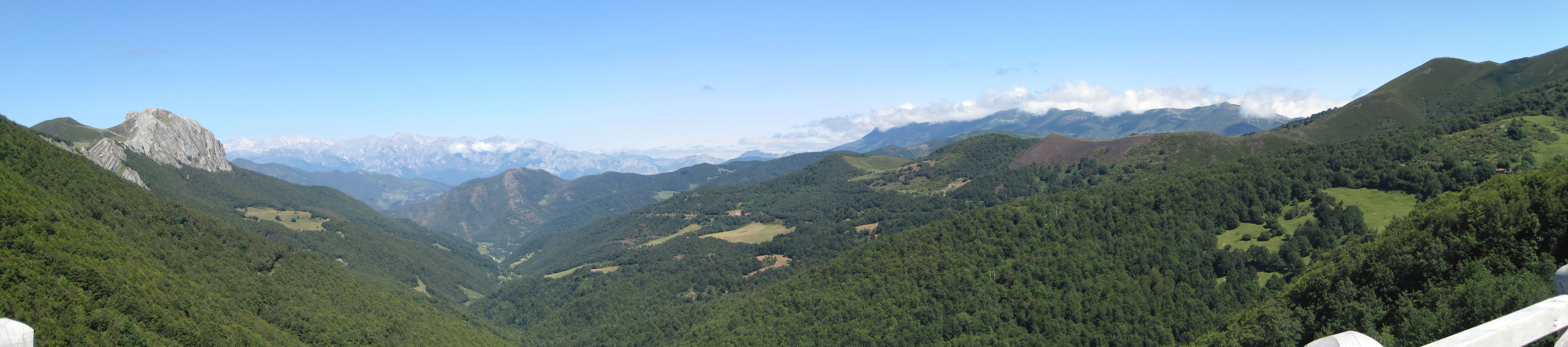
Panoramic view of Liébana, with Picos de Europa and Peña Sagra in the background, from the top of the pass.

== See also ==
- Highest roads in the world
