= Mariano de la Mata =

Spanish Roman Catholic priest

Blessed Mariano de la Mata Aparício O.S.A.
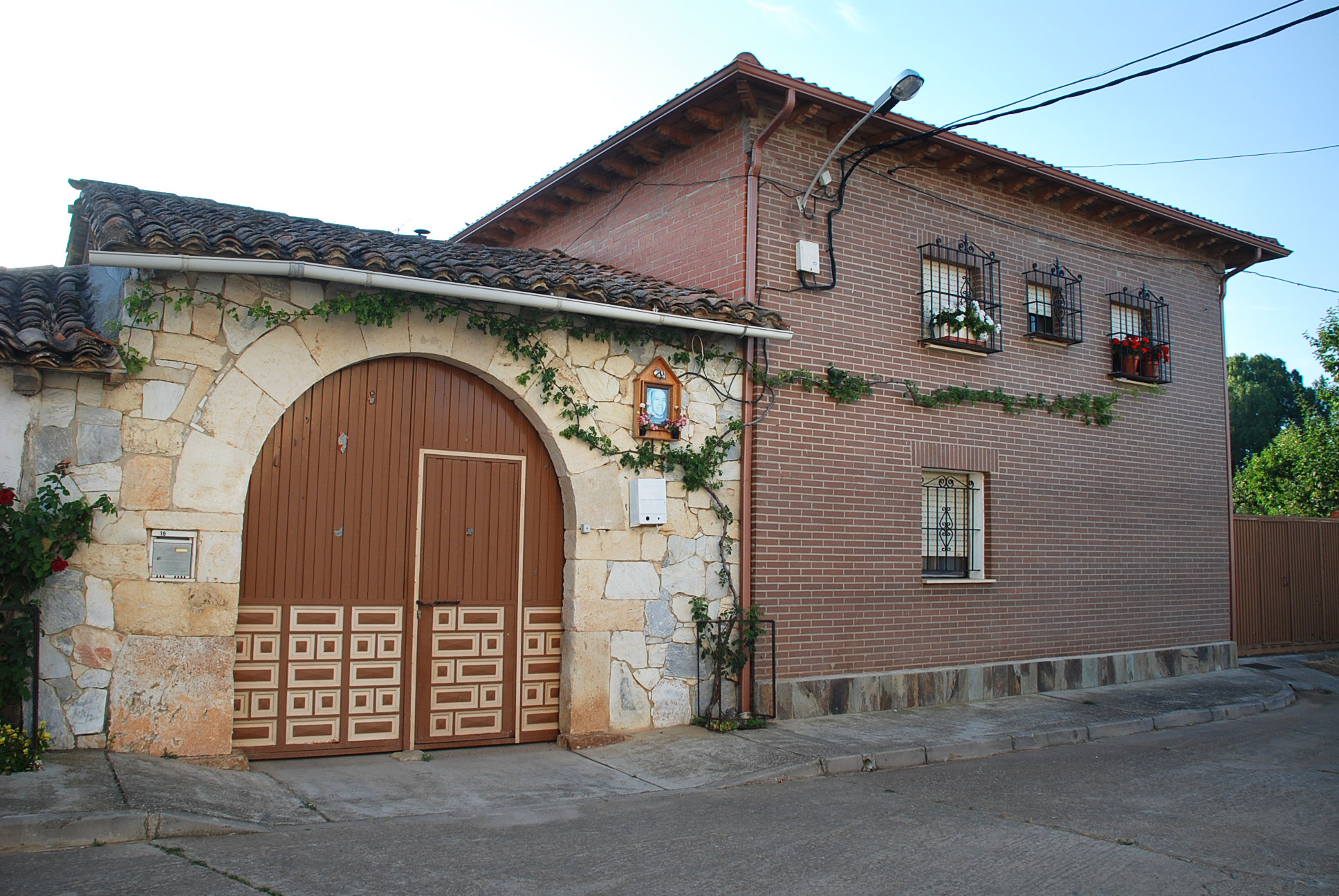

Priest
- Born: 31 December 1905; La Puebla de Valdavia, Palencia, Kingdom of Spain
- Died: 5 April 1983 (aged 77); São Paulo, Brazil
- Beatified: 5 November 2006, São Paulo Cathedral, Brazil by Cardinal José Saraiva Martins
- Feast: 5 April
- Attributes: Priest's attire
- Patronage: Missionaries; Against cancer

Mariano de la Mata Aparício, OSA (31 December 1905 - 5 April 1983) was a Spanish Catholic priest and a professed member of the Order of Saint Augustine. He joined the missions in Brazil where he served until his death and was known for his educational work with the poor. His age and diminishing health was no obstacle for him throughout his time in Brazil and it did not hinder his efforts to visit the sick or go out to be with the people he looked after.

His beatification cause opened on 14 December 1996 and he became titled as a Servant of God while Pope John Paul II confirmed his heroic virtue on 20 December 2004 and titled him as Venerable; Pope Benedict XVI beatified him on 5 November 2006 though Cardinal José Saraiva Martins presided over the celebration in Brazil.

== Life ==
Mariano de la Mata Aparício was born in Palencia on 31 December 1905 as one of eight children to Manuel and Martina. Three brothers before him had become members of the Order of Saint Augustine while he was the uncle of six who joined that order. He entered the Order of Saint Augustine in 1921 and then began his studies for the priesthood in Valladolid before continuing his studies at Santa María de la Vid in Burgos. He was vested in the habit on 9 September 1921 and in 1922 made his initial profession; he had received the habit from the Blessed Anselm Polanco. In 1926 he was transferred back to Santa María de la Vid where he completed his theological courses. He made his solemn profession on 23 January 1927 and he was later ordained to the priesthood on 25 July 1930. He was appointed to teach at one of the order's school (College la Encarnación) at Llanes for a brief period of time and then in July 1931 was sent to the order's vice-province of Brazil to work there. He first worked in a local parish from 1931 to 1933 at Taquaritinga in the São Paulo state. In 1933 he was transferred to the Saint Augustine college where he taught natural sciences until 1949 and from 1942 to 1945 he was also the college's administrator. From 1945 to 1948 he led the Brazil branch of the order as the Prior Vice-Provincial. He continued his apostolate in São Paulo as a professor and superior in Engenheiro Schmitt.

In 1961 he returned to teach at the Saint Augustine college and also took on the duties of a spiritual director at the Saint Rita of Cascia Workshop as well as the parochial vicar of the Saint Augustine church. He tended to the needs of those who surrounded him and went to visit the sick on a regular basis as was the case with Sergio Teixera. He visited this student of his for twelve months on a regular basis and gave him private lessons during his illness. Another student - Horacio Gentile - was visited on a regular basis during his two month time in the hospital notwithstanding the great distance and steep climb the prelate had to endure to get to him. In character he was remembered as an active and enterprising prelate who was open and communicative to all; a person of affection and kindness. He organized more than 200 of the Saint Rita Workshops which attracted poor people to make clothing that the poor could afford. He was often seen walking down the streets of São Paulo to pastoral visits though even as he aged and his strength waned and his vision grew dim he still made this a practice.

He had his sight diminishing due to cataracts which he removed but had his eyes covered for a little while despite his evident frustration at being unable to do things. He was diagnosed with cancer in January 1983 and underwent an operation to remove a malignant tumor in the pancreas but the cancer continued to spread at a rapid pace. He died from cancer on 5 April 1983. His remains rest beside the altar of the Virgin of Consolation in the church of Saint Augustine in São Paulo. The Brazilian consulate - from Spain - awarded him the posthumous honor of having the Order of Isabella the Catholic.

== Beatification ==
The beatification process opened on 14 December 1996 after the Congregation for the Causes of Saints titled the late priest as a Servant of God and issued the official "nihil obstat" to the cause while Cardinal Paulo Evaristo Arns oversaw the diocesan process from 31 May 1997 until 16 December 1997. The C.C.S. validated this process in Rome on 12 February 1999 and received the Positio dossier from the postulation later in 2002. The six theologians assigned to review it approved it on 27 April 2004 as did the C.C.S. on 5 October 2004. The confirmation of the late priest's heroic virtue allowed for Pope John Paul II to title him as Venerable on 20 December 2004.

The miracle for beatification was investigated in the Brazilian diocese that it originated in and concerned the healing of the child João Paulo Polotto who let go of his mother's hand and crossed the street and suffered a fractured skull after a truck hit him. The child was hospitalized with a severe cerebral hemorrhage but was healed. The process received C.C.S. validation on 23 November 2001 and a medical panel of experts approved that the child's healing was a miracle on 21 October 2004; theologians likewise agreed on 2 February 2005 as did the C.C.S. on 7 June 2005. Pope Benedict XVI confirmed this miracle on 28 April 2006 and thus approved the beatification. Cardinal José Saraiva Martins presided over the celebration on the pope's behalf before 8000 people in the São Paulo Cathedral on 5 November 2006.

The current postulator for this cause is the Augustinian priest Josef Sciberras.
