= Cornoncillo =

Hamlet in Castile and León, Spain

Coordinates: 42.706°N 4.670°W

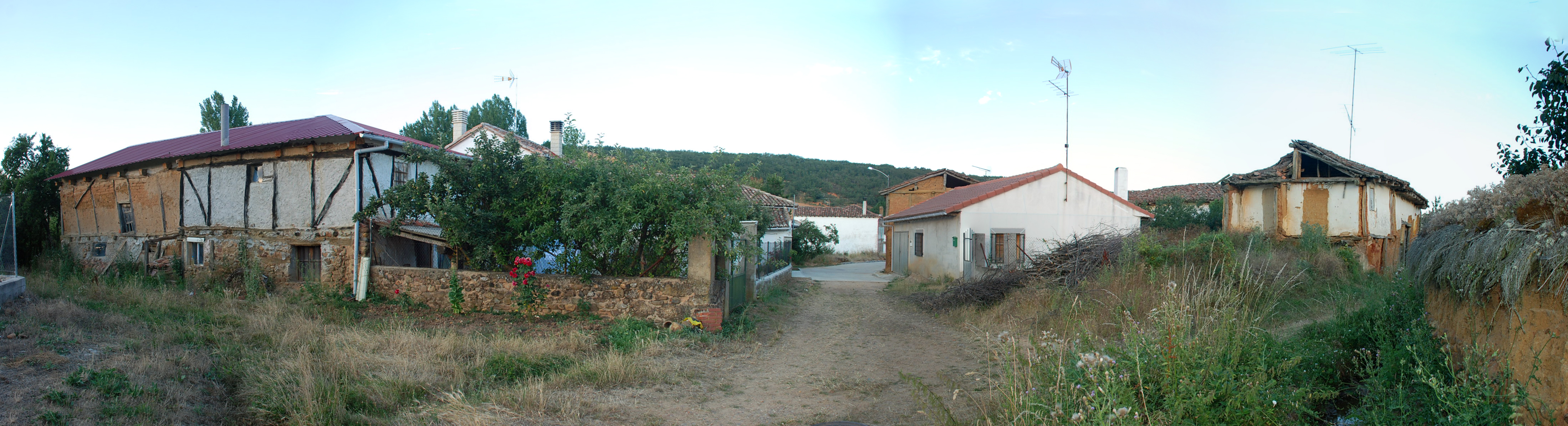
Cornoncillo (Palencia, Castile and León)

Cornoncillo is a hamlet in the municipality of Congosto de Valdavia. This municipality belongs to the province of Palencia and the autonomous community (first level division of Spain) of Castile and León. Its population consisted in 9 inhabitants in the year 2017.

== History ==
This hamlet has been related to a military campaign of Augustus against the Cantabri by several people.

In the late 19th century, Cornoncillo was inhabited by 115 people.
