= Cabezón de Liébana =

- Municipality
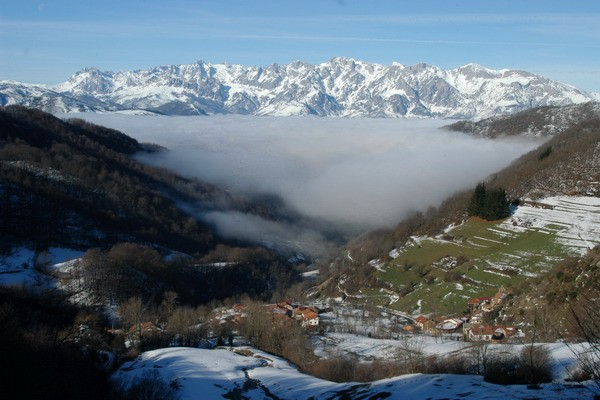

- Flag Coat of arms

- Location of Cabezón de Liébana

- Location within Cantabria Cabezón de Liébana (Spain)
- Coordinates: 43°8′8″N 4°34′30″W
- Country: Spain
- Autonomous community: Cantabria
- Province: Cantabria
- Comarca: Liébana
- Judicial district: San Vicente de la Barquera
- Capital: Cabezón de Liébana

Government
  - Alcalde: Manuel Heras Gómez (2007) (PP)

Area
  - Total: 81.43 km^{2} (31.44 sq mi)
- Elevation: 363 m (1,191 ft)

Population (2025-01-01)
  - Total: 530
  - Density: 6.5/km^{2} (17/sq mi)
- Time zone: UTC+1 (CET)
  - Summer (DST): UTC+2 (CEST)
- Postal code: 39571
- Website: Official website

Cabezón de Liébana is a municipality located in the autonomous community of Cantabria, Spain. According to the 2007 census, the city has a population of 708 inhabitants.

== Villages ==
- Aniezo
- Buyezo
- Cabezón de Liébana (Capital)
- Cahecho
- Cambarco
- Frama
- Lamedo
- Luriezo
- Perrozo
- Piasca
- San Andrés
- Torices
- Yebas

== Gallery ==
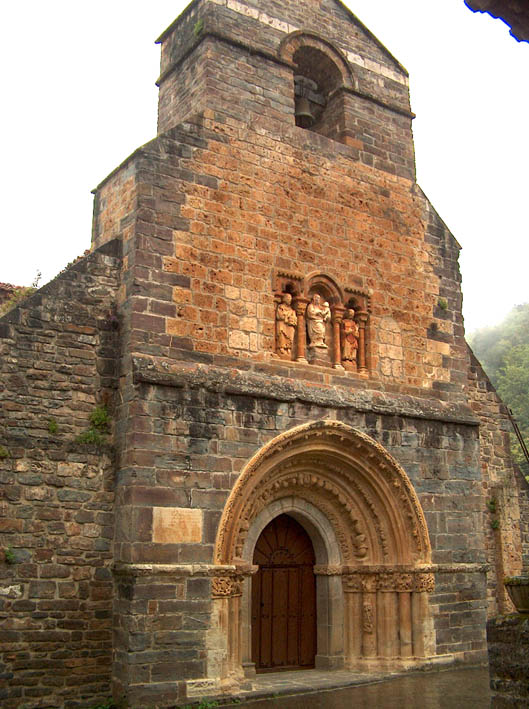
Romanesque church of Santa María de Piasca, Principal facade (12th century).

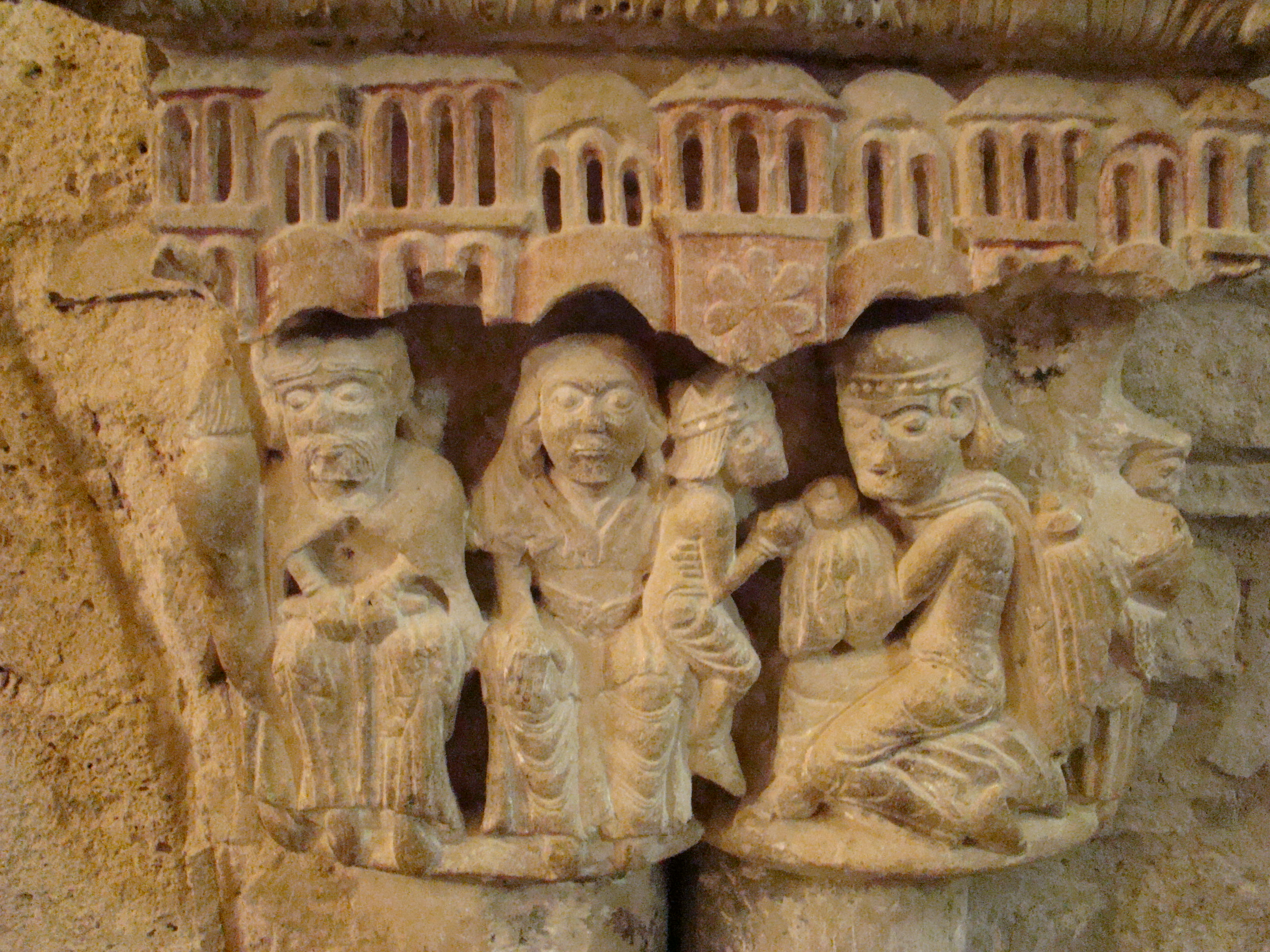
Romanesque church of Santa María de Piasca, detail.
