= Aniezo =

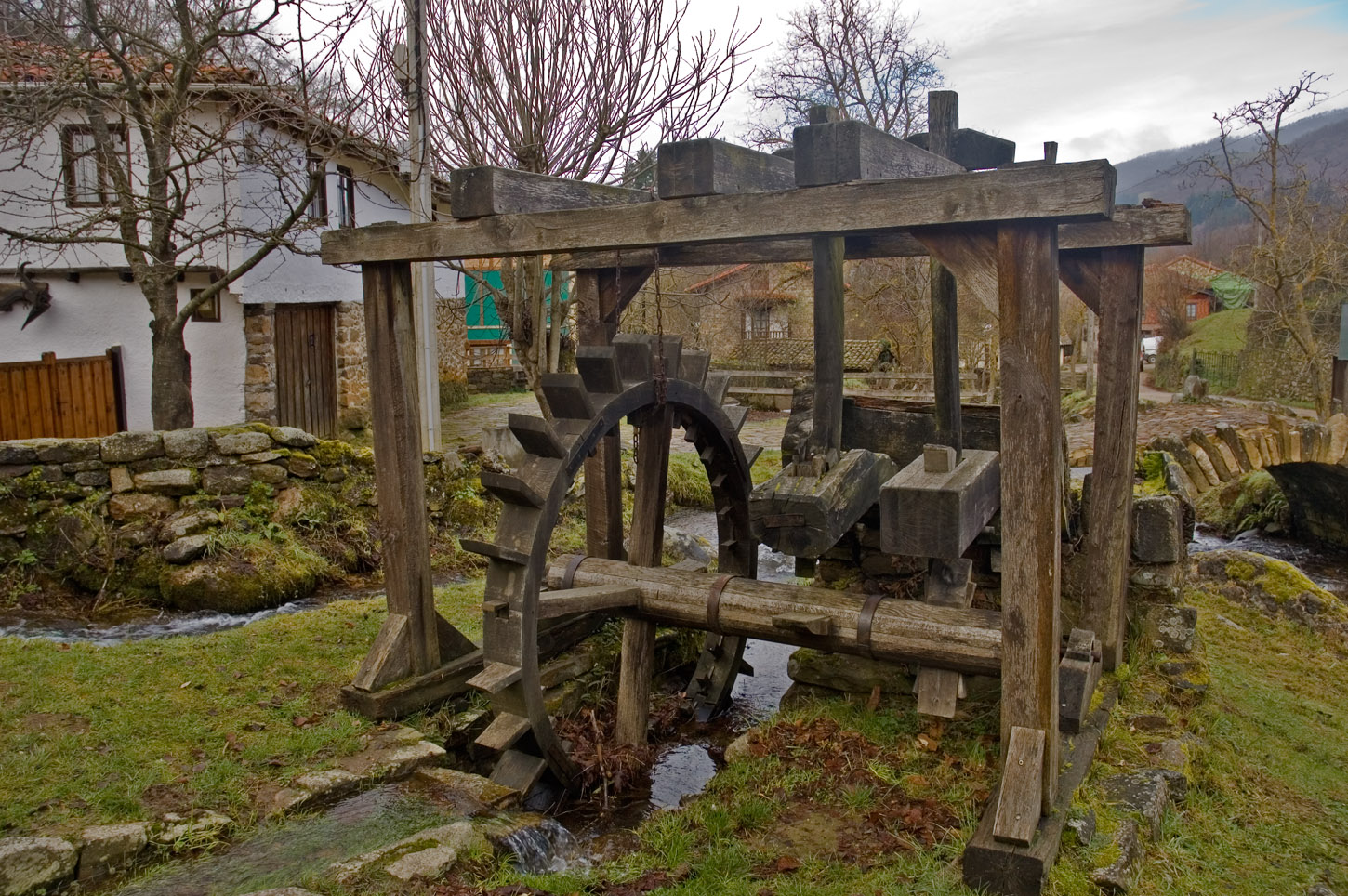
- Interactive map of Aniezo
- Coordinates: 43°8′45″N 4°31′24″W
- Country: Spain
- Autonomous community: Cantabria
- Province: Cantabria
- Comarca: Liébana
- Municipality: Cabezón de Liébana
- Elevation: 683 m (2,241 ft)

Population (2009)
  - Total: 33
- Postal code: 39571
- Distance from Santander: 128.6 km (79.9 mi)
- Distance from Cabezón de Liébana: 6.6 km (4.1 mi)

Aniezo is a hamlet in the municipality of Cabezón de Liébana, (Cantabria, Spain). The 2009 census showed Aniezo to have a population of 33 inhabitants (INE). It is located at an altitude of 683 metres above sea level, and 6.6 km from the municipal capital, Cabezón de Liébana.

According to tradition, Saint Beatus of Liebana was born here. The fiesta of 'La Santuca' is celebrated on 2 May every year. It is a celebration that has taken place since the 15th century. A wooden carving of the Virgin Mary is carried in a procession down the mountain to the Monastery Santo Toribio de Liébana which is 15 km away. It is known as the longest procession in Spain.

== Demographics ==
Demographic evolution
2000	2001	2002	2003	2004	2005	2006	2007	2008	2009
31	38	39	34	37	37	33	32	32	33

Source: INE
