= Buyezo =

Coordinates: 43°7′13″N 4°30′35″W

Buyezo is a small town located near Potes and Picos de Europa in Cantabria, Spain.
