= Villabasta de Valdavia =

- municipality
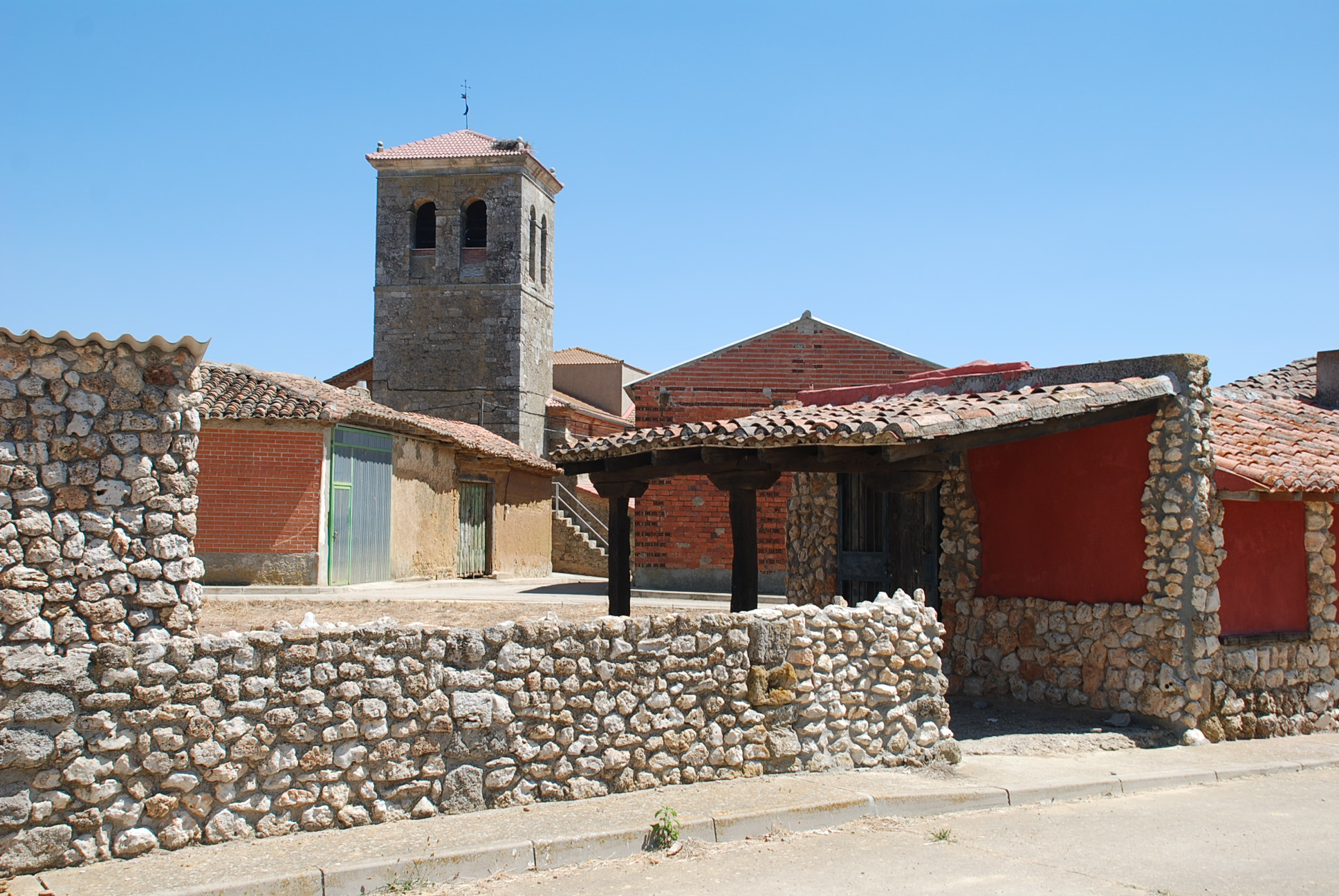

- Flag Coat of arms

- Location in Spain
- Coordinates: 42.5614°N 4.6019°W
- Country: Spain
- Autonomous community: Castile and León
- Province: Palencia
- Municipality: Villabasta de Valdavia

Area
  - Total: 11 km^{2} (4.2 sq mi)

Population (2025-01-01)
  - Total: 33
  - Density: 3.0/km^{2} (7.8/sq mi)
- Time zone: UTC+1 (CET)
  - Summer (DST): UTC+2 (CEST)
- Website: Official website

Villabasta de Valdavia is a municipality located in the province of Palencia, Castile and León, Spain. According to the 2004 census (INE), the municipality has a population of 38 inhabitants.
