= Villasarracino =

Coordinates: 42°25′N 4°30′W

- municipality
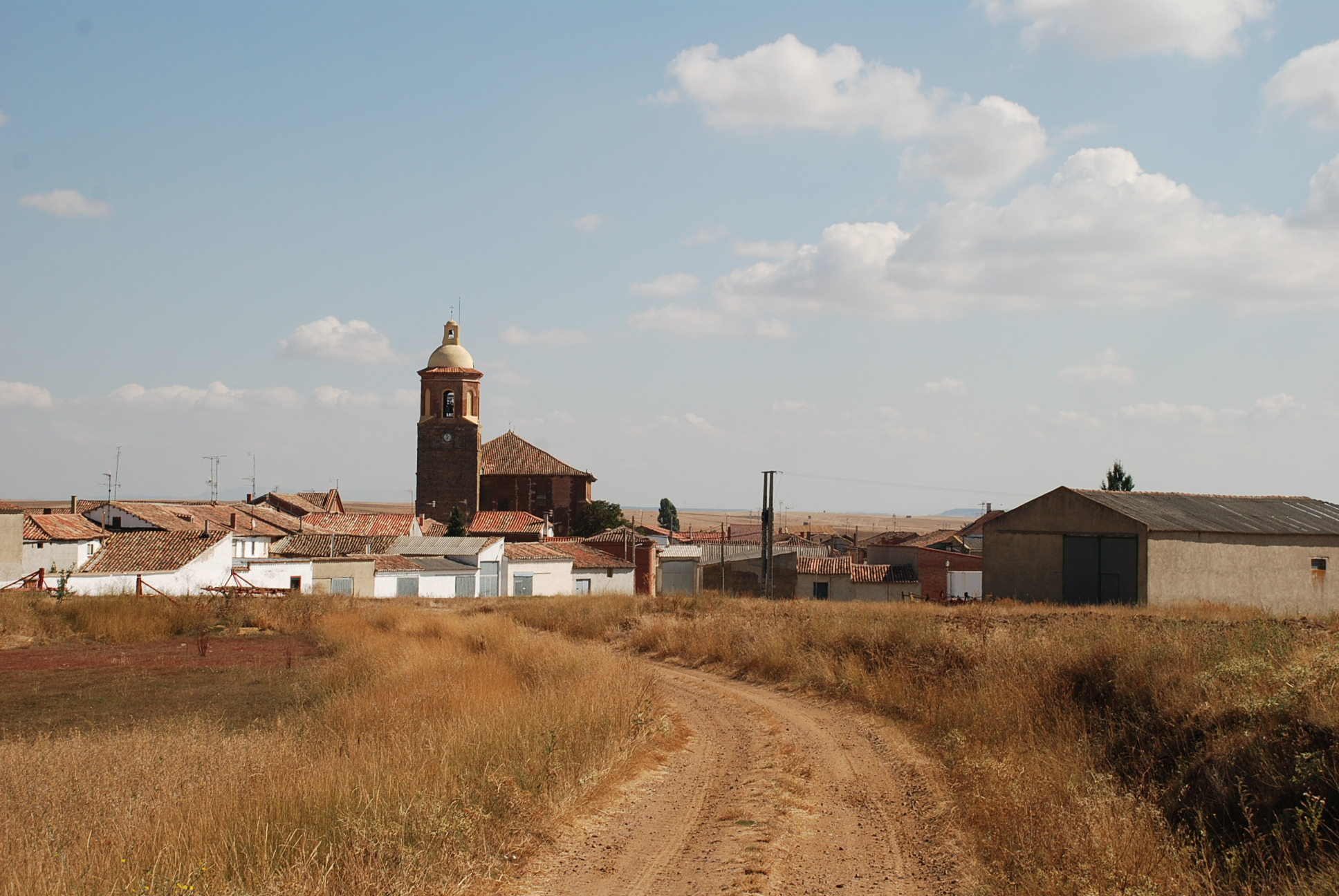

- Coat of arms
- Interactive map of Villasarracino
- Country: Spain
- Autonomous community: Castile and León
- Province: Palencia
- Municipality: Villasarracino

Area
  - Total: 20 km^{2} (7.7 sq mi)

Population (2025-01-01)
  - Total: 125
  - Density: 6.2/km^{2} (16/sq mi)
- Time zone: UTC+1 (CET)
  - Summer (DST): UTC+2 (CEST)
- Website: Official website

Villasarracino (In Spanish, Villasarracinno) is a municipality located in the province of Palencia, Castile and Leon, Spain. According to the 2022 census (INE), the municipality has a population of 127 inhabitants.
