= Villanuño de Valdavia =

Coordinates: 42°30′N 4°31′W

- municipality
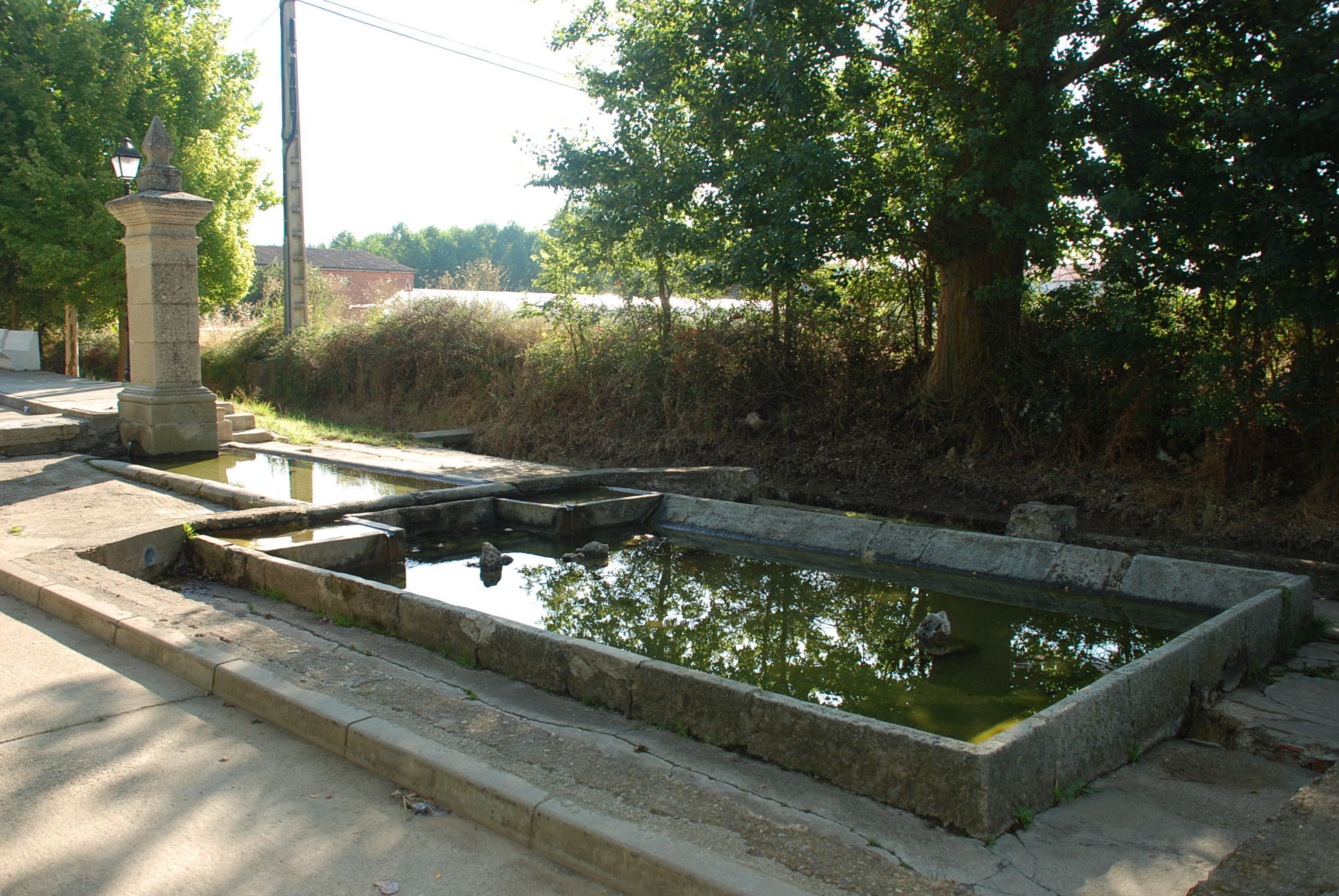

- Flag Coat of arms
- Interactive map of Villanuño de Valdavia
- Country: Spain
- Autonomous community: Castile and León
- Province: Palencia
- Municipality: Villanuño de Valdavia

Area
  - Total: 30 km^{2} (12 sq mi)

Population (2025-01-01)
  - Total: 91
  - Density: 3.0/km^{2} (7.9/sq mi)
- Time zone: UTC+1 (CET)
  - Summer (DST): UTC+2 (CEST)
- Website: Official website

Villanuño de Valdavia is a municipality located in the province of Palencia, Castile and León, Spain. According to the 2022 census (INE), the municipality has a population of 94 inhabitants.
