= Congosto de Valdavia =

Coordinates: 42°43′N 4°38′W

- municipality
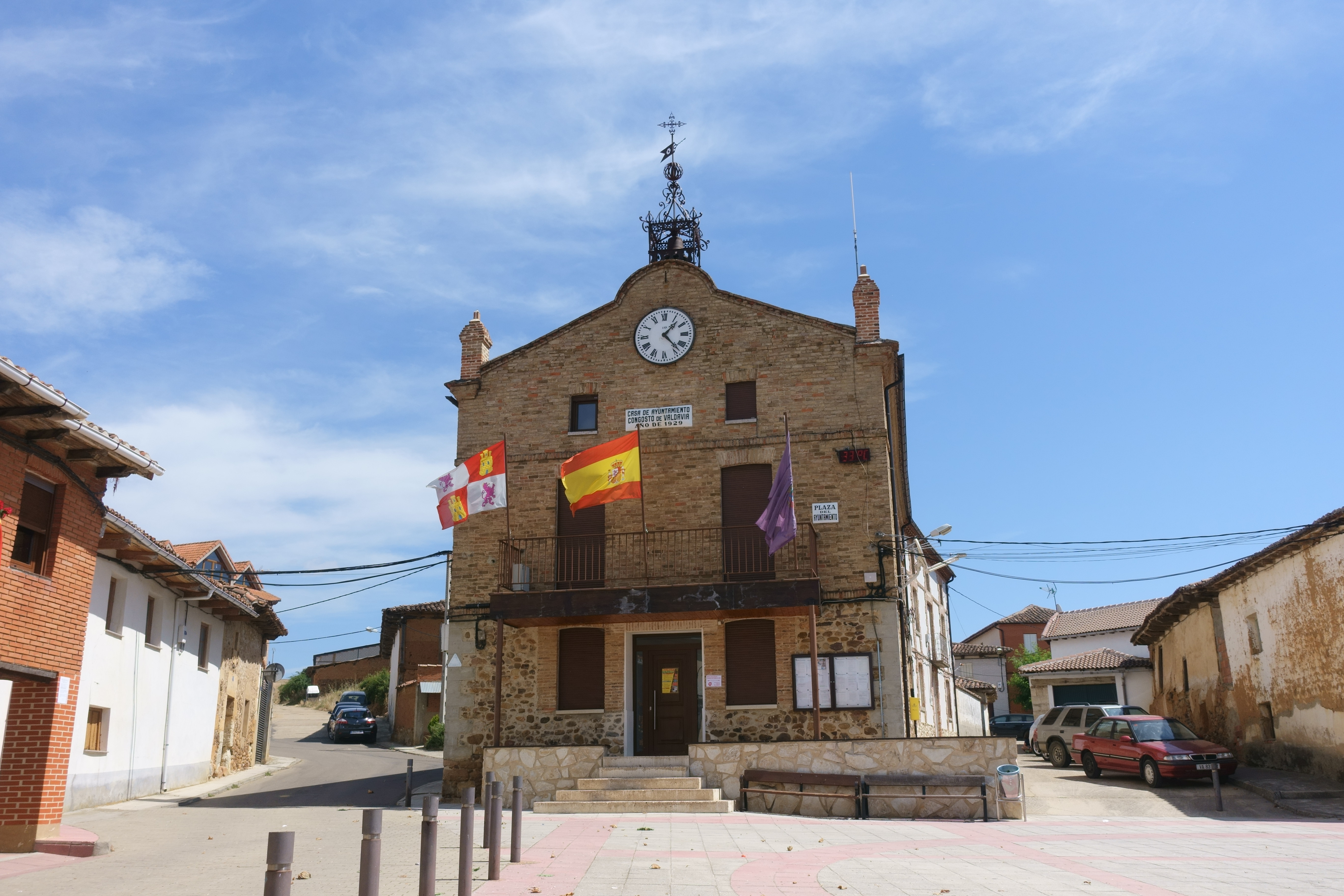
- Interactive map of Congosto de Valdavia
- Country: Spain
- Autonomous community: Castile and León
- Province: Palencia
- Municipality: Congosto de Valdavia

Area
  - Total: 68 km^{2} (26 sq mi)

Population (2025-01-01)
  - Total: 132
  - Density: 1.9/km^{2} (5.0/sq mi)
- Demonym: Congosteño (in Spanish)
- Time zone: UTC+1 (CET)
  - Summer (DST): UTC+2 (CEST)
- Website: Official website

Congosto de Valdavia is a municipality located in the province of Palencia, Castile and León, Spain. According to the 2004 census (INE), the municipality has a population of 239 inhabitants.

== History ==
One hamlet of this municipality whose name is Cornoncillo, has been related by several people with the military campaign of Augustus against the Cantabri.

Another hamlet of the municipality, Villanueva de Abajo, had its origin in a repopulation of the 10th century. A cemetery of the Low Middle Ages, a necropolis has been discovered in the locality.

== Main sights ==
These are most notable buildings following historic and architectural criteria:

- Congosto de Valdavia Parish Church
- San Roque Shrine
- Small Sanctuary Nuestra Señora del Otero

== Festivities ==
These are the main festivities of the municipality:

- Romeria Virgen del Otero Church: a festivity which is held beside that church.
- Nuestra Señora: This festivity is held on 15 August.
- San Roque: It is held of 16 August.
