= Castrillo de Villavega =

Coordinates: 42°27′N 4°29′W

- municipality
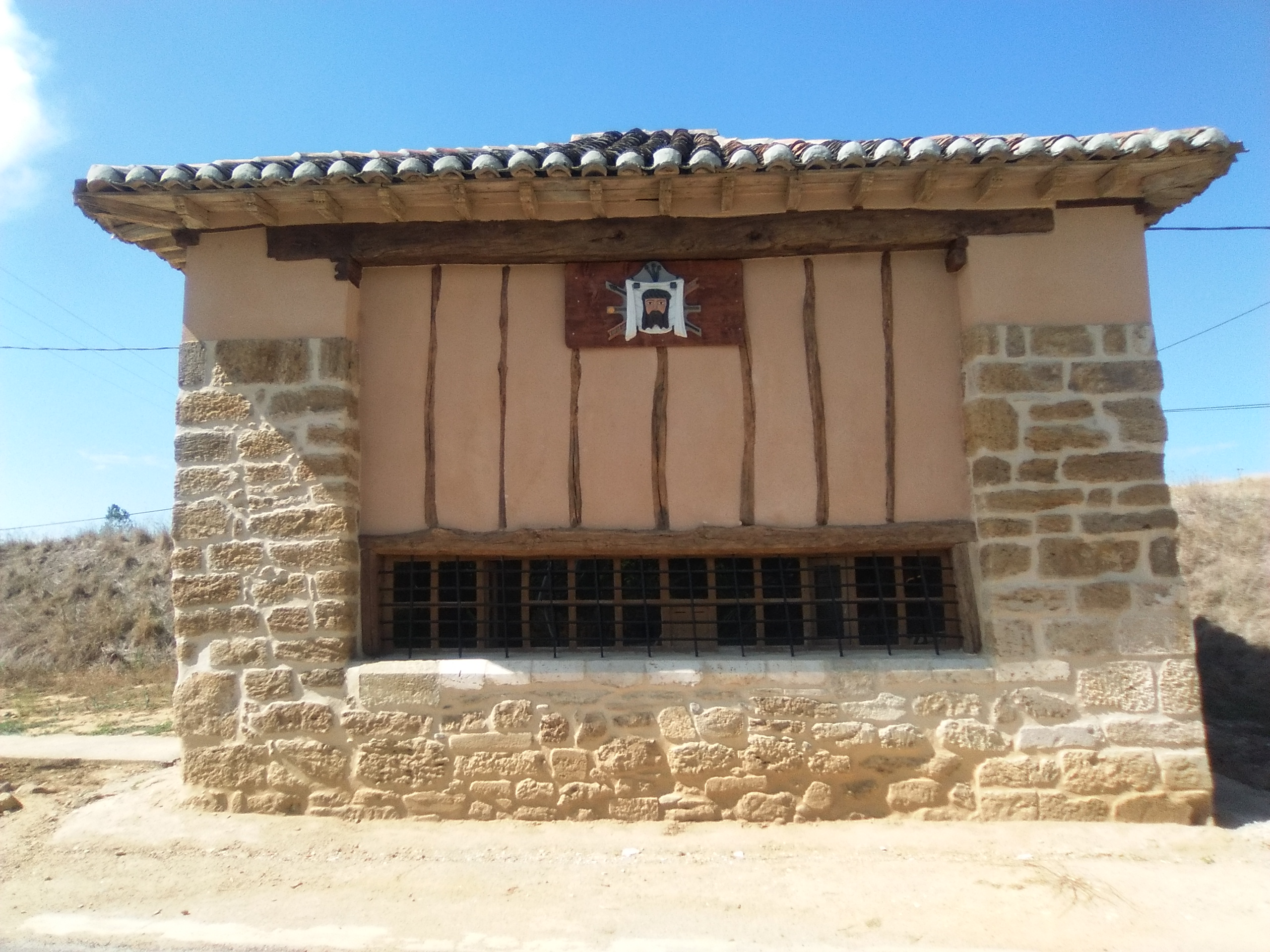

- Flag Coat of arms
- Interactive map of Castrillo de Villavega
- Country: Spain
- Autonomous community: Castile and León
- Province: Palencia
- Municipality: Castrillo de Villavega

Area
  - Total: 33 km^{2} (13 sq mi)

Population (2025-01-01)
  - Total: 167
  - Density: 5.1/km^{2} (13/sq mi)
- Time zone: UTC+1 (CET)
  - Summer (DST): UTC+2 (CEST)
- Website: Official website

Castrillo de Villavega is a municipality located in the province of Palencia, Castile and León, Spain. According to the 2004 census (INE), the municipality has a population of 255 inhabitants.

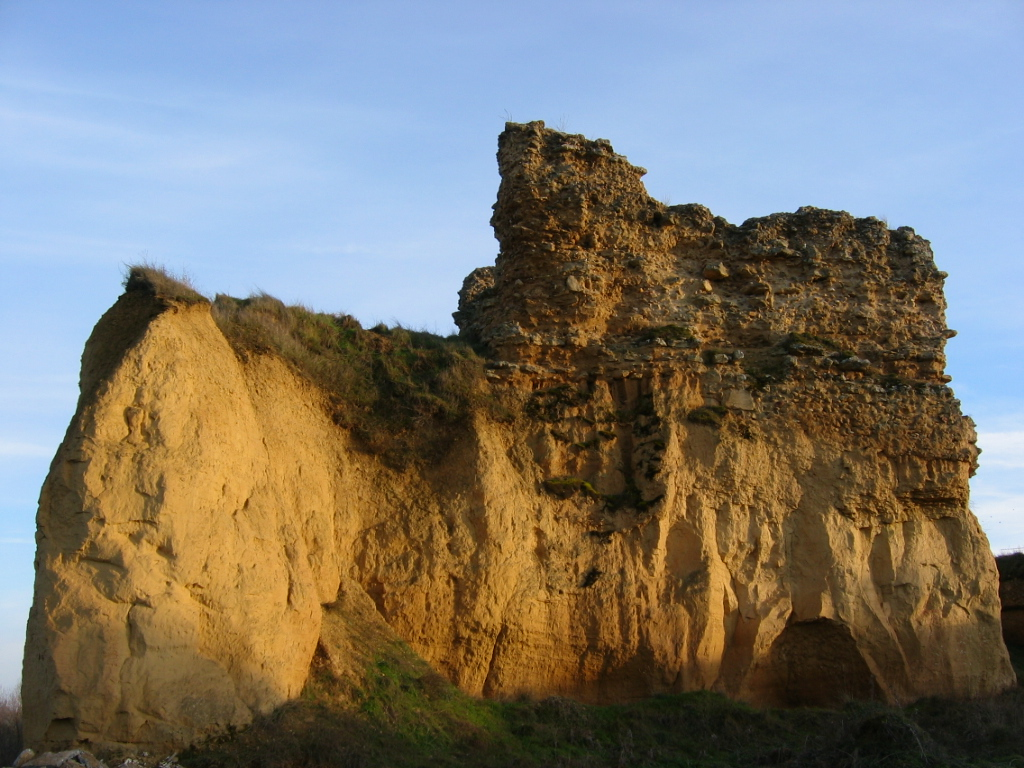
Ruins of the Castle of de Castrillo de Villavega, built in the 9th and 10th centuries.
