= Buenavista de Valdavia =

Coordinates: 42°38′15″N 4°36′51″W

- Municipality
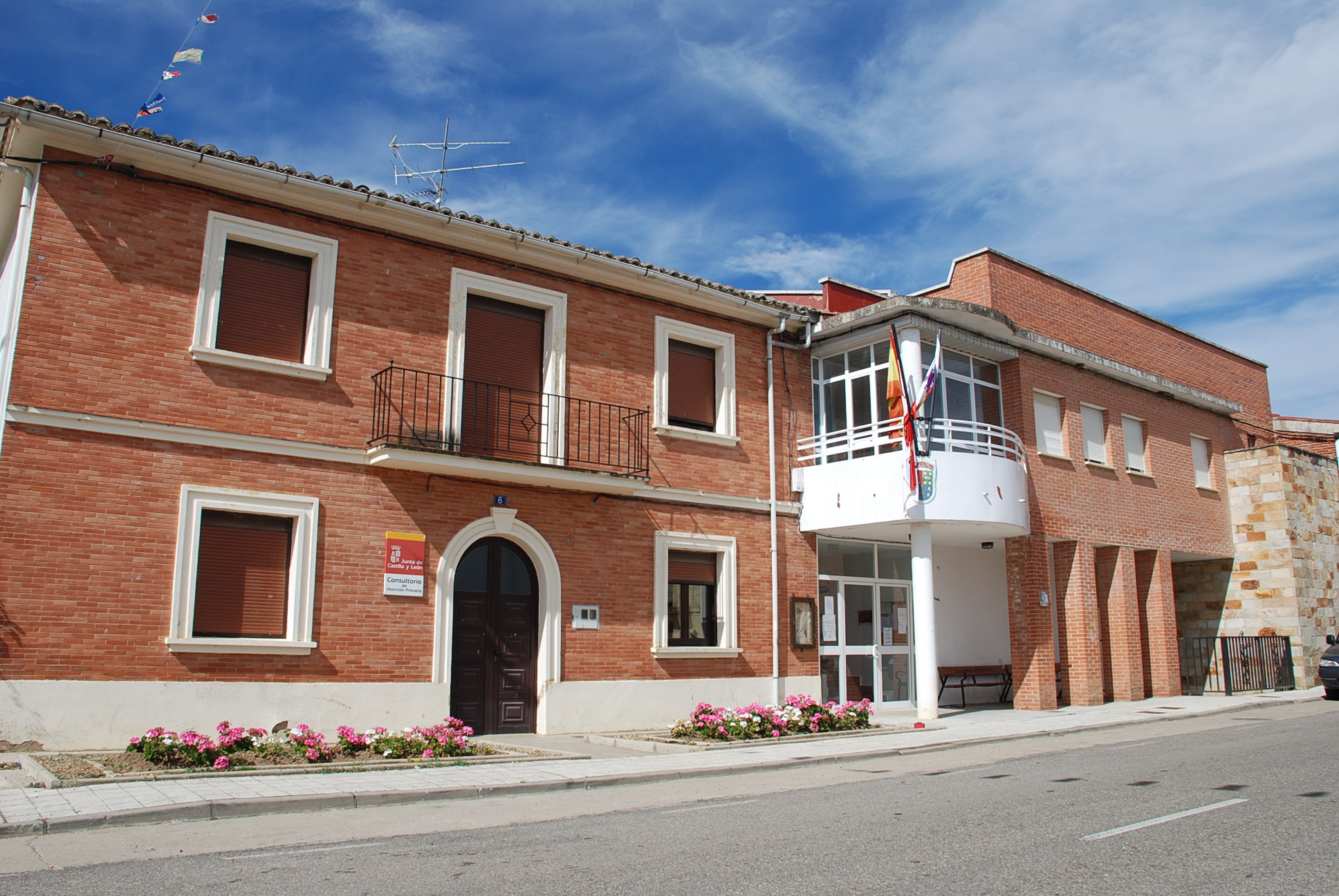

- Flag Coat of arms
- Interactive map of Buenavista de Valdavia
- Country: Spain
- Autonomous community: Castile and León
- Province: Palencia
- Municipality: Buenavista de Valdavia

Government
  - Mayor: Abundio Marcos Rodriguez

Area
  - Total: 81 km^{2} (31 sq mi)

Population (2025-01-01)
  - Total: 290
  - Density: 3.6/km^{2} (9.3/sq mi)
- Time zone: UTC+1 (CET)
  - Summer (DST): UTC+2 (CEST)
- Website: Official website

Buenavista de Valdavia is a municipality located in the province of Palencia, Castile and León, Spain. As of January 2015, the municipality has a population of 354 inhabitants.

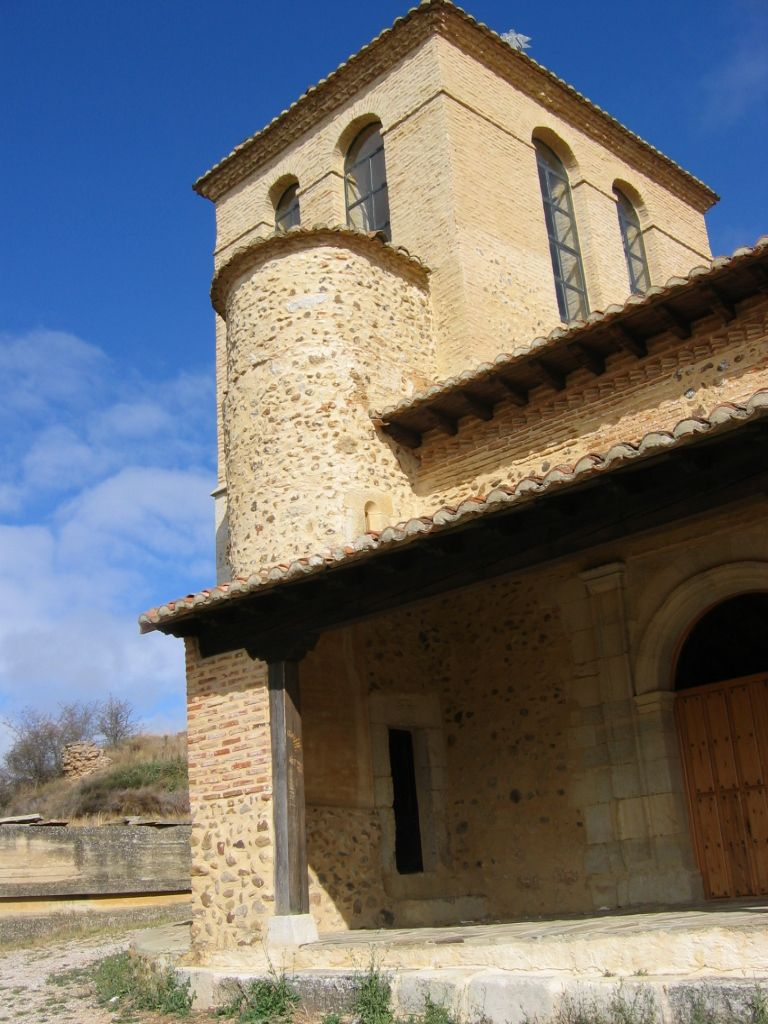
Church of los Santos Justo y Pastor.

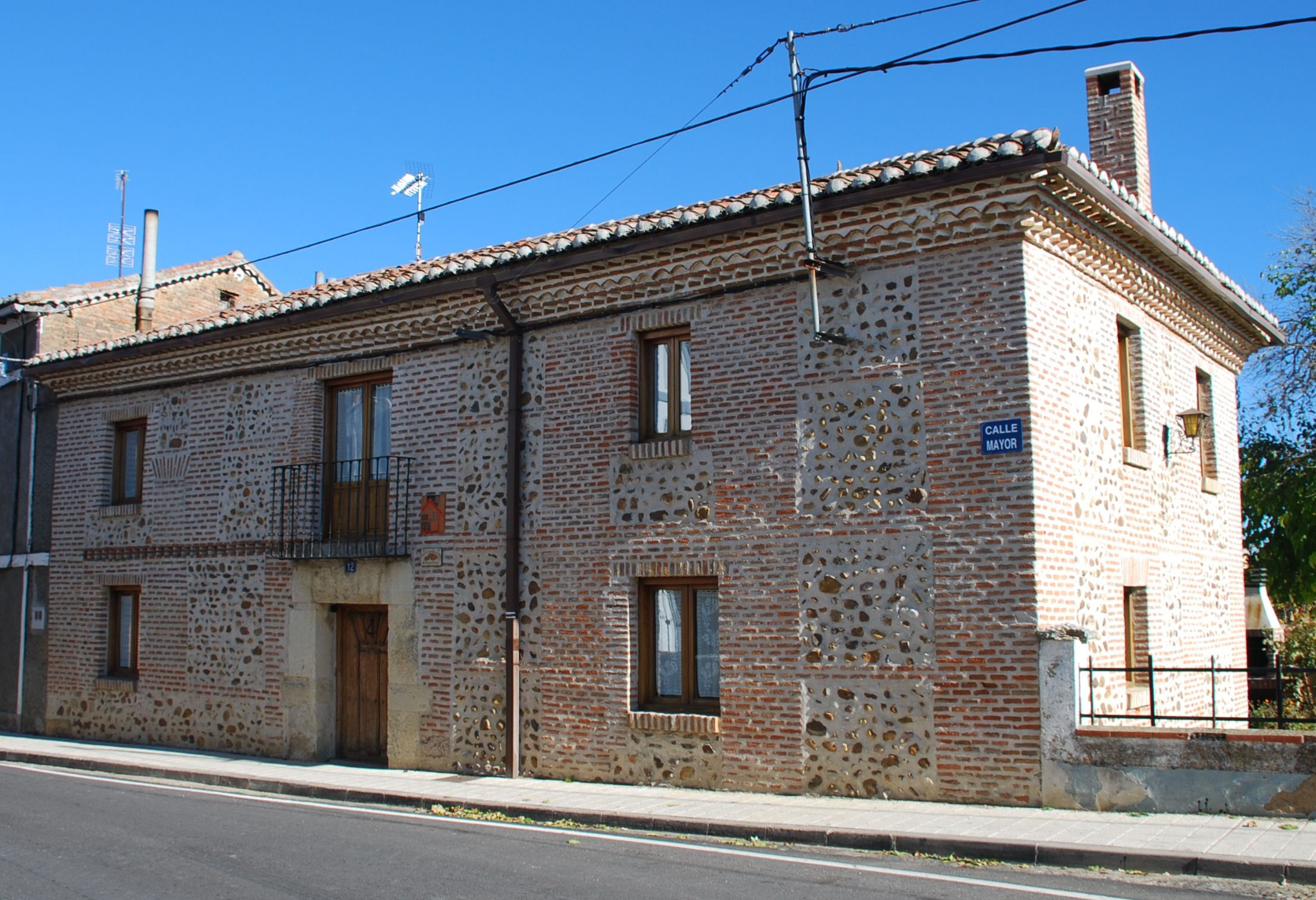
Rural house of Buenavista de Valdavia.
