= Villaeles de Valdavia =

Coordinates: 42°34′N 4°35′W

- municipality
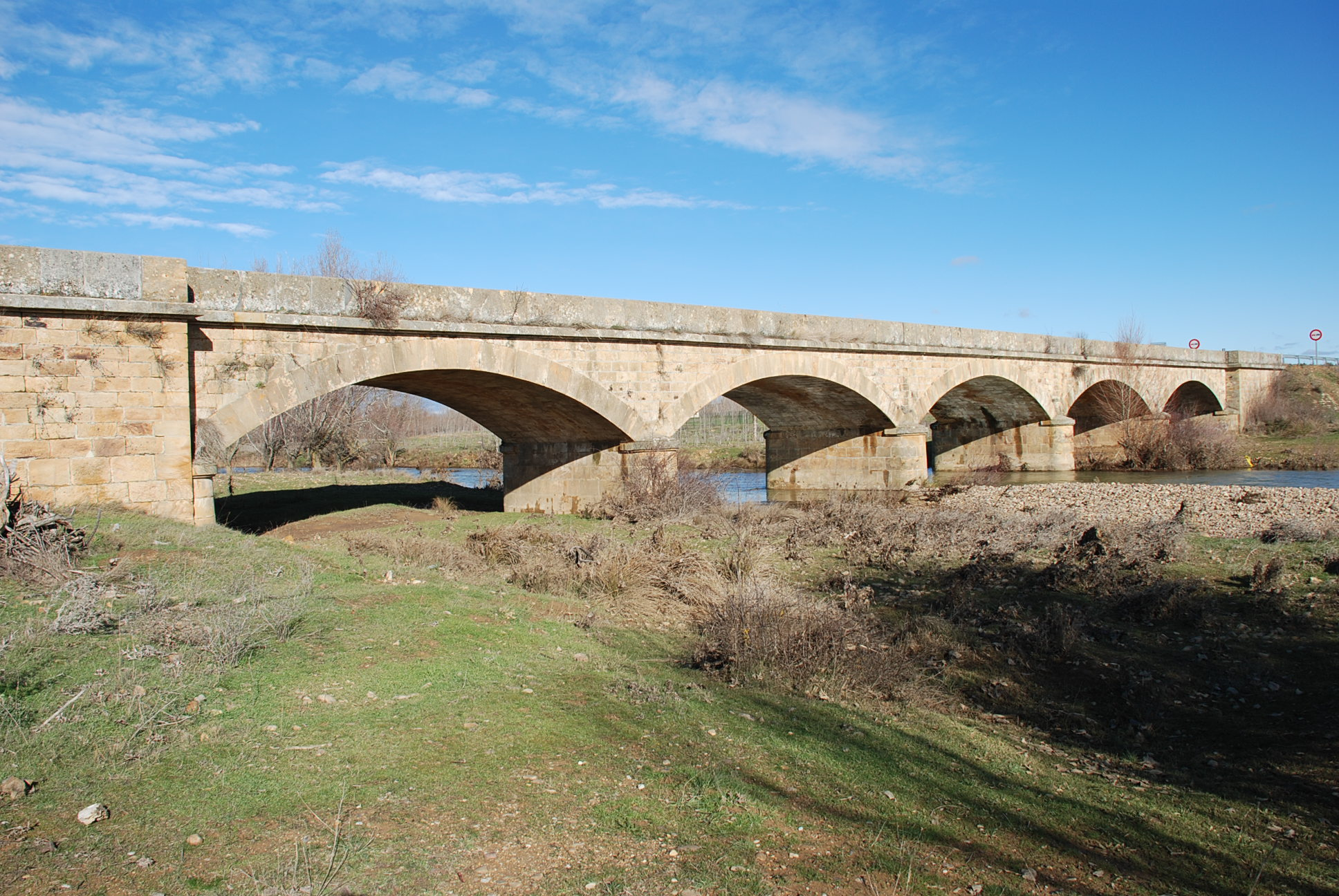

- Flag Coat of arms
- Interactive map of Villaeles de Valdavia
- Country: Spain
- Autonomous community: Castile and León
- Province: Palencia
- Municipality: Villaeles de Valdavia

Area
  - Total: 20 km^{2} (7.7 sq mi)

Population (2025-01-01)
  - Total: 47
  - Density: 2.4/km^{2} (6.1/sq mi)
- Time zone: UTC+1 (CET)
  - Summer (DST): UTC+2 (CEST)
- Website: Official website

Villaeles de Valdavia is a municipality located in the province of Palencia, Castile and León, Spain. According to the 2004 census (INE), the municipality has a population of 74 inhabitants.
