= Ojeda =

Ojeda may refer to:

== Places ==
- Ciudad Ojeda, city in Venezuela

=== Municipalities in Spain ===
- Báscones de Ojeda
- La Vid de Ojeda
- Micieces de Ojeda
- Olmos de Ojeda
- Payo de Ojeda
- Prádanos de Ojeda

== Surname ==
- Ojeda (surname)
