= Oteros de Boedo =

- Hamlet
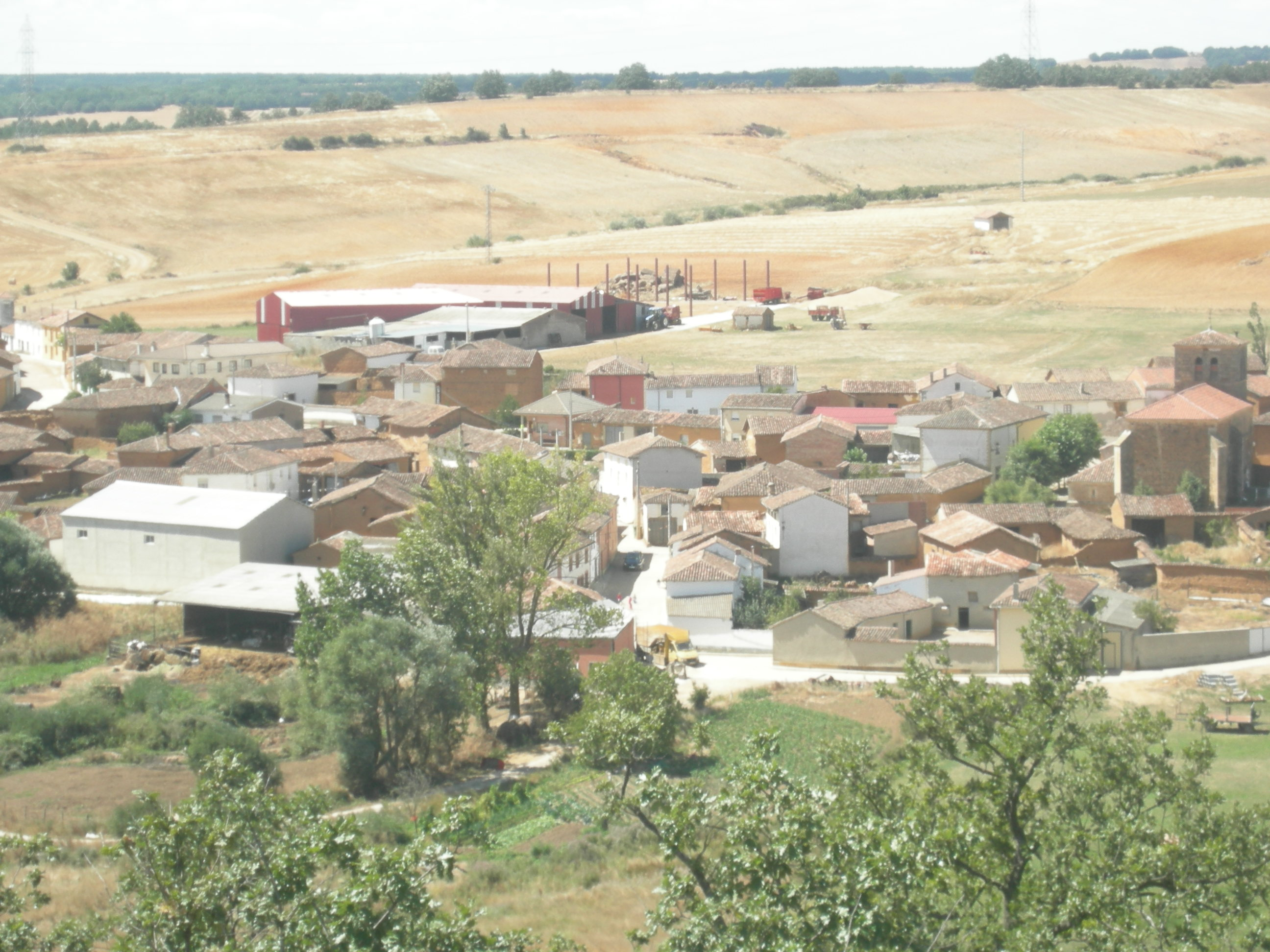
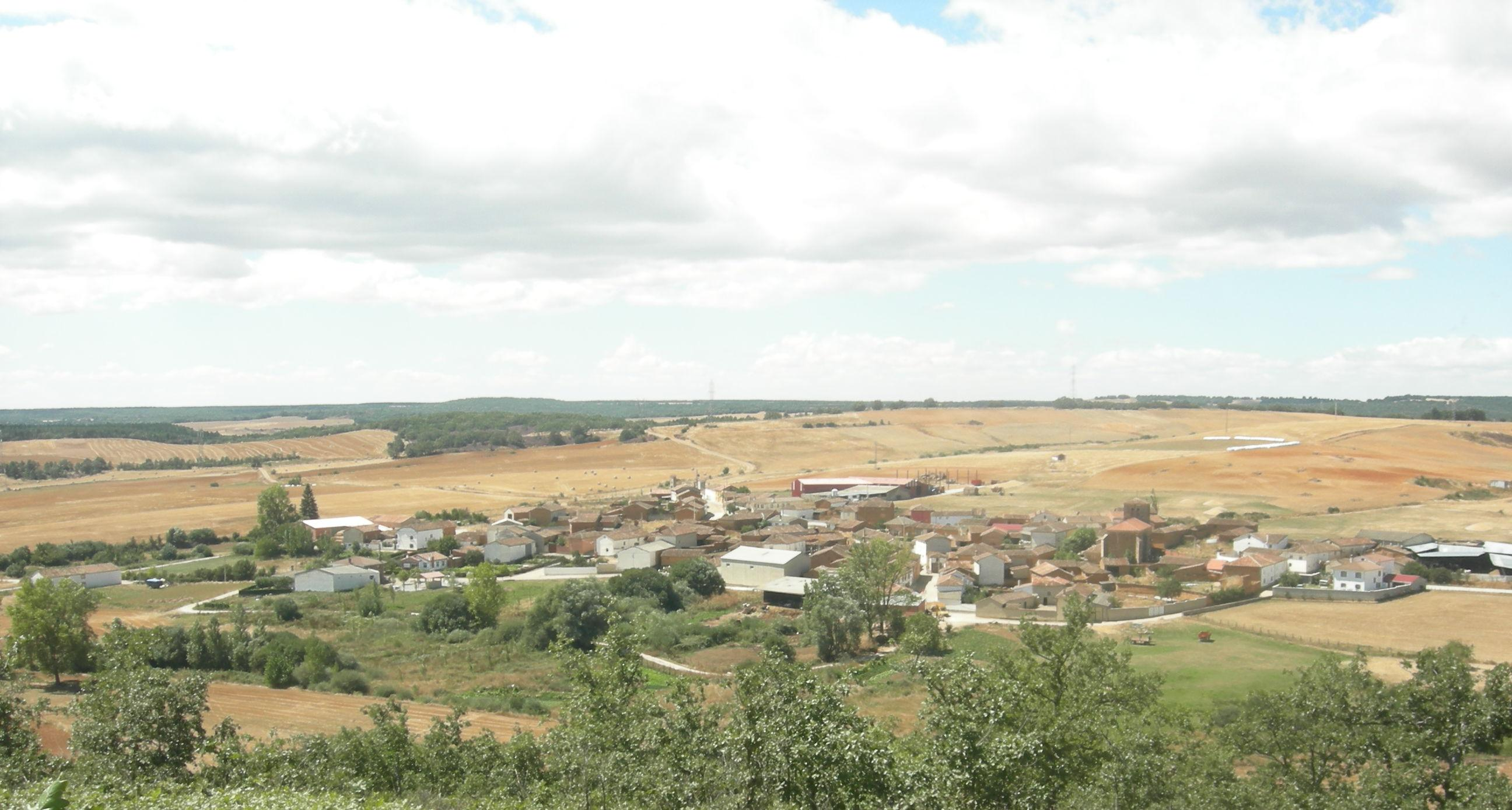

- Location in Spain
- Coordinates: 42°39′18.9″N 4°29′25.2″W
- Country: Spain
- Autonomous community: Castile and León
- Province: Palencia
- Comarca: Páramos-Valles

Government
  - Alcalde: Gerardo Blanco García (P.P.)
- Elevation: 975 m (3,199 ft)

Population
  - Total: 43 (2,014)
- Demonym(s): Oterino, na.
- Time zone: UTC+1 (CET)
  - Summer (DST): UTC+2 (CEST)
- Postal code: 34406
- Dialing code: 979
- Official language(s): Spanish

Oteros de Boedo is a hamlet of the natural region of Boedo-Ojeda (within the administrative region of Páramos-Valles) in the Province of Palencia, autonomous community of Castile and Leon, Spain, it belongs to the municipality of Collazos de Boedo.

== Geography ==
It is located near a little hill close to the Boedo river. It is situated north of the province of Palencia and is halfway between the subregions of La Ojeda and La Valdavia, in the region of Boedo-Ojeda. His road situation regarding other localities is 4.1 km east from Báscones de Ojeda, 8.4 km north from Revilla de Collazos, 8.3 km west from Dehesa de Romanos, 9.4 km west from La Vid de Ojeda and 11 km north from Collazos de Boedo, capital and center of the municipality. Access to the village can be done either by the regional road P-223 that goes from La Puebla de Valdavia to Alar del Rey or by dirt roads that connect with most nearby towns.

=== Nearby towns ===
The following are the locations which municipal districts border the municipality of the hamlet of Oteros de Boedo:

Northwest: Báscones de Ojeda	North: Micieces de Ojeda	Northeast: Micieces de Ojeda
West: Revilla de Collazos		East: La Vid de Ojeda, Micieces de Ojeda
Southwest Revilla de Collazos	South: Revilla de Collazos, Dehesa de Romanos	Southeast: Dehesa de Romanos

== Demography ==
- According to the Instituto Nacional de Estadística (National Institute of Statistics) on January 1, 2014, the population of the town was of 43 inhabitants.

Despite this, the Oteros de Boedo population increases during the months of July, August and half of September. In the last fifty years the population figures of the town have suffered a huge decline due to the depopulation which took and still takes place in the Spanish countryside, being Castile and Leon the Spanish region where this fact caused more havoc.

The population of the Province of Palencia was drastically reduced due to an exodus by the generations between the 1950s, 1960s and 1970s. The few employment opportunities, lack of services and low professional valuation granted to workers led thousands of palentinos to migrate to other parts of the Spanish territory where they would have a greater chance of success, leading the province to lose in only thirty years 20% of its workforce population.

== Economy ==
Agriculture and livestock are the two main economic activities in which people of working age are based. These activities represent more than 90% of the occupation of these people together with freight with own specialized vehicles. Some other occupations, although few, also performed in the village.

== History ==
During the Middle Ages it belonged to the largest Merindad of Monzón, Meryndat de Monçon. When the Antiguo Régimen fell the village became a constitutional municipality that in the census of 1842 counted on 20 homes and 104 neighbors, later integrated into the municipal council of Collazos de Boedo.

== Local festivities ==
The festivities of Oteros de Boedo, on the occasion of the days of Our Lady and Saint Roch, are on 14th, 15th and 16 August of each year. The program of the celebrations usually includes new innovations every year, but there are several activities that are always repeated as the great pancetada and chorizada occurring in the Fountain Square barbecues, the local championships of palentino bowling and nita, a rural nightclub session until the morning in the town square.
