= Dehesa (disambiguation) =

Dehesa is a type of agricultural landscape of Spain and Portugal.

Dehesa may also refer to:

== Places ==
- Dehesa, California, in the Granite Hills and Alpine areas of San Diego County, California
  - Dehesa School District
- Dehesa, Veracruz, municipality in the state of Veracruz, Mexico
- Dehesa de Campoamor, a village in the municipality of Orihuela, Spain
- Dehesa de Cuéllar, a hamlet in Cuéllar municipality, Spain
- Dehesa de Montejo, a municipality located in the province of Palencia, Spain
- Dehesa de Romanos, a municipality the province of Palencia, Spain
- Dehesas Viejas, a municipality in the province of Granada, Spain
- Dehesas de Guadix, a municipality located in the province of Granada, Spain
- La Dehesa, suburban neighborhood of Santiago, Chile

== People ==
- Daniel Dehesa Mora (born 1950), Mexican politician
- Francisco de la Dehesa, Spanish 17th-century sculptor
- Germán Dehesa (1944–2010), Mexican journalist, academic and writer
- Guillermo de la Dehesa (born 1941), Spanish lawyer, economist, and politician
- Karl Dehesa, Filipino-American professional basketball player
- Teodoro A. Dehesa Méndez, governor of the Mexican state of Veracruz (1892–1911)
