= Collazos de Boedo =

Coordinates: 42°37′N 4°29′W

- municipality
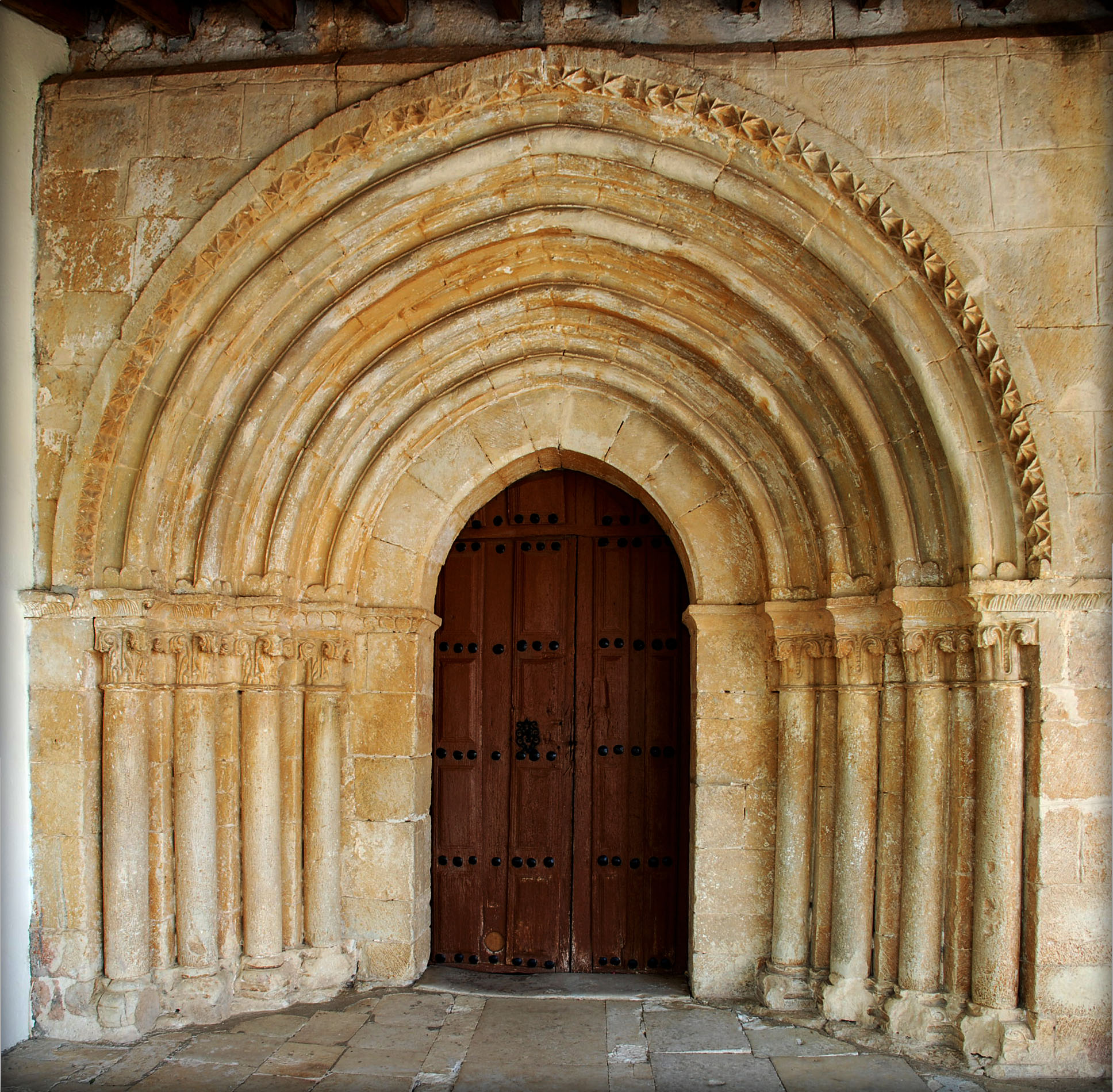
- Interactive map of Collazos de Boedo
- Country: Spain
- Autonomous community: Castile and León
- Province: Palencia
- Municipality: Collazos de Boedo

Area
  - Total: 20 km^{2} (7.7 sq mi)

Population (2025-01-01)
  - Total: 89
  - Density: 4.4/km^{2} (12/sq mi)
- Time zone: UTC+1 (CET)
  - Summer (DST): UTC+2 (CEST)
- Website: Official website

Collazos de Boedo is a municipality located in the province of Palencia, Castile and León, Spain. According to the 2011 census (INE), the municipality has a population of 128 inhabitants. The municipality includes the hamlet of Oteros de Boedo.
