= Moarves de Ojeda =

Spanish town

Moarves de Ojeda is a town belonging to the municipality of Olmos de Ojeda in the province of Palencia (Castile & León, Spain). The population of Moarves of Ojeda is 31 according to the Spanish Statistics National Institute (INE) in 2012. Altitude: 939 metres. Latitude: 42° 42′ N Longitude: 004° 24′ O

== History ==
The toponym Moarves comes from the word mozarabs (the name of the town in the Middle Ages was Moharabes) referring to the first settlers of the town that were the Mozarabs.

The town belonged to the Merindad menor de Monzon (a type of former county subdivision dating from the 12th century). When the Former Regime disappeared, the town became an independent municipality. In the 1842 census, there were 18 households and 63 neighbours. Finally, the town merged into the larger municipality of Olmos de Ojeda.

== Artistic heritage ==
The most important monument in Moarves de Ojeda is the Church of St John the Baptist, also known as St John of Moarves. It is a superb Romanesque style church.

There is another church: the Church of St Peter that keeps Romanesque corbels.

== Gallery of images ==
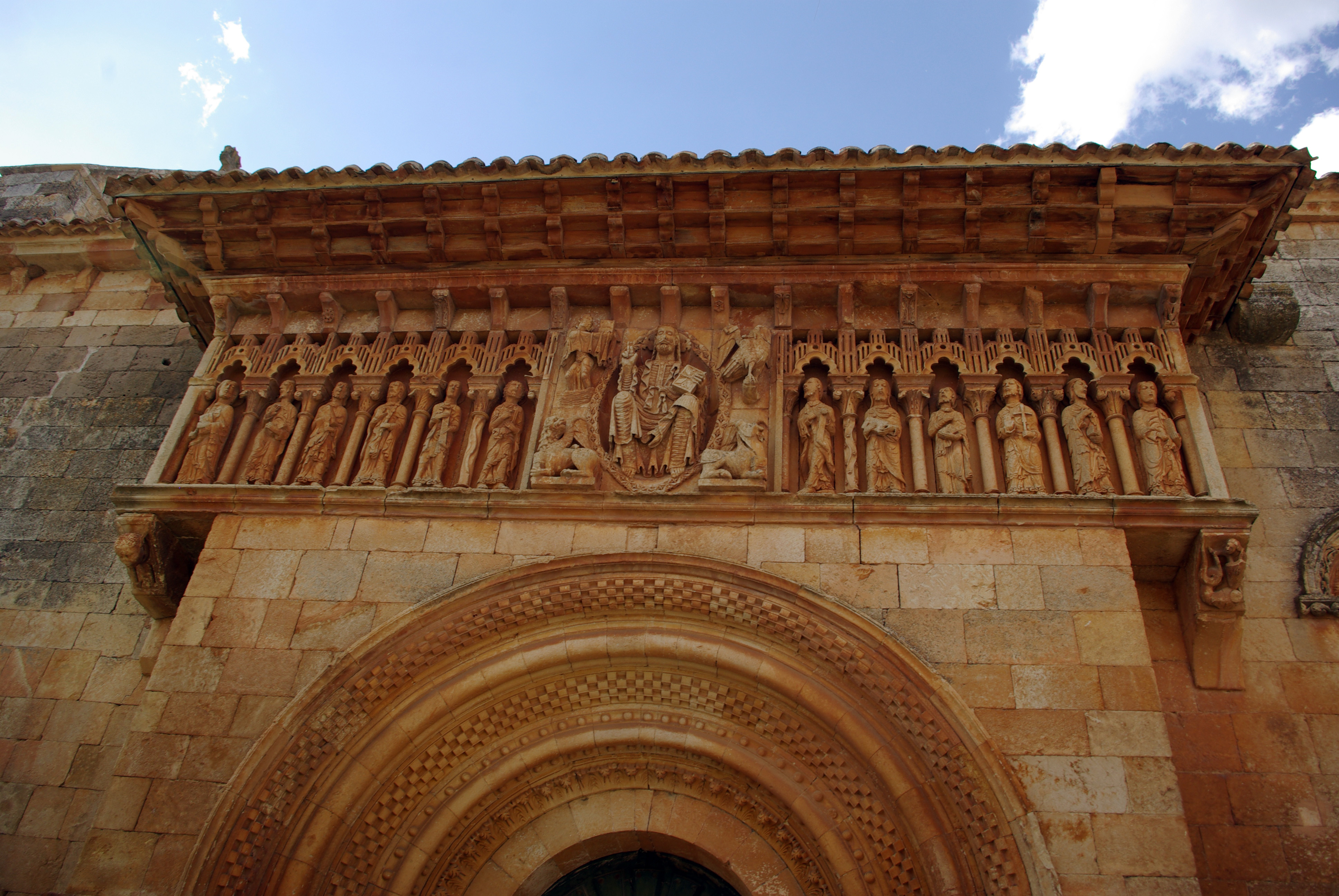
St John the Baptist Church's Romanesque Portico

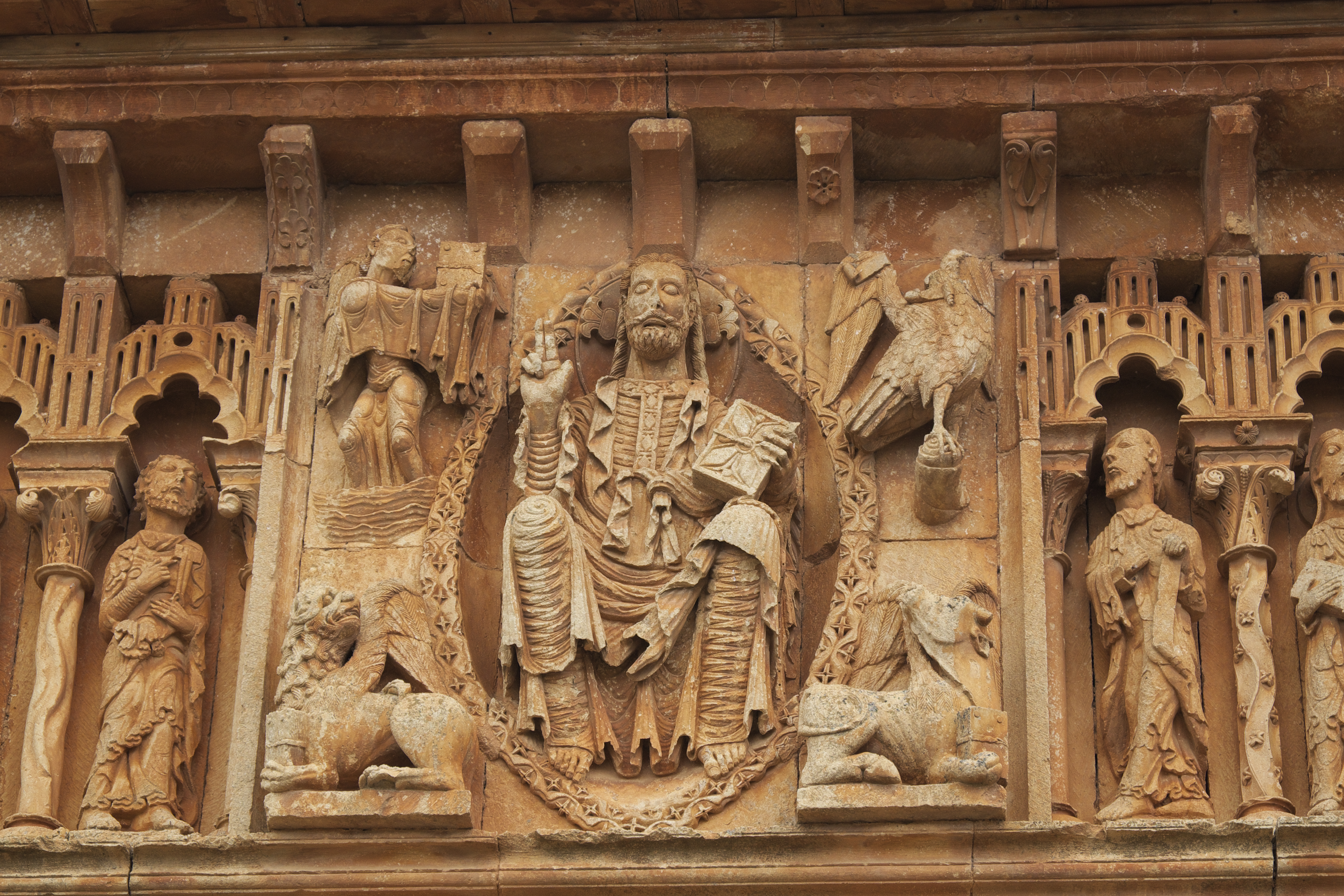
Christ Pantochrator (detail)

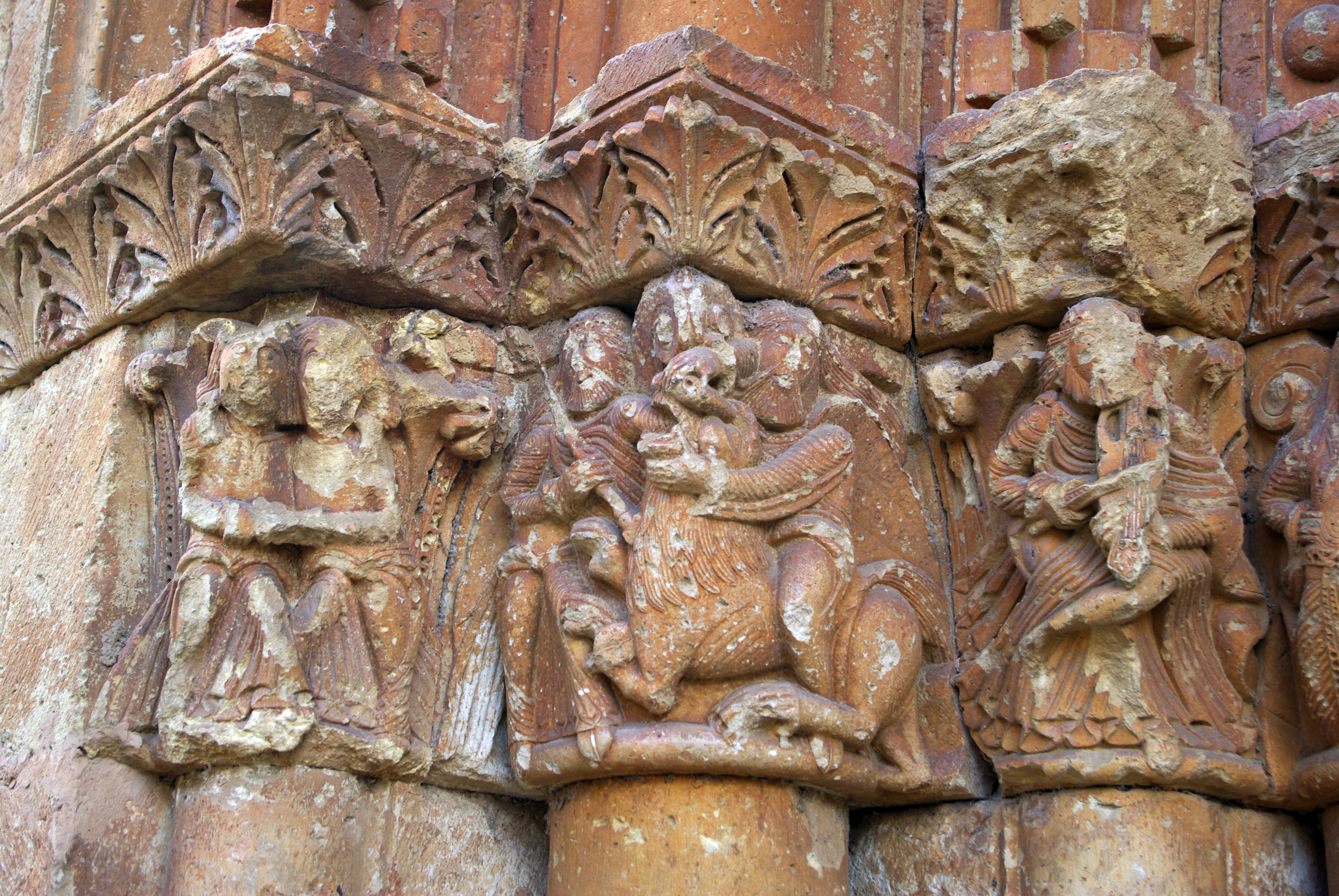
St John the Baptist capital: The Warriors

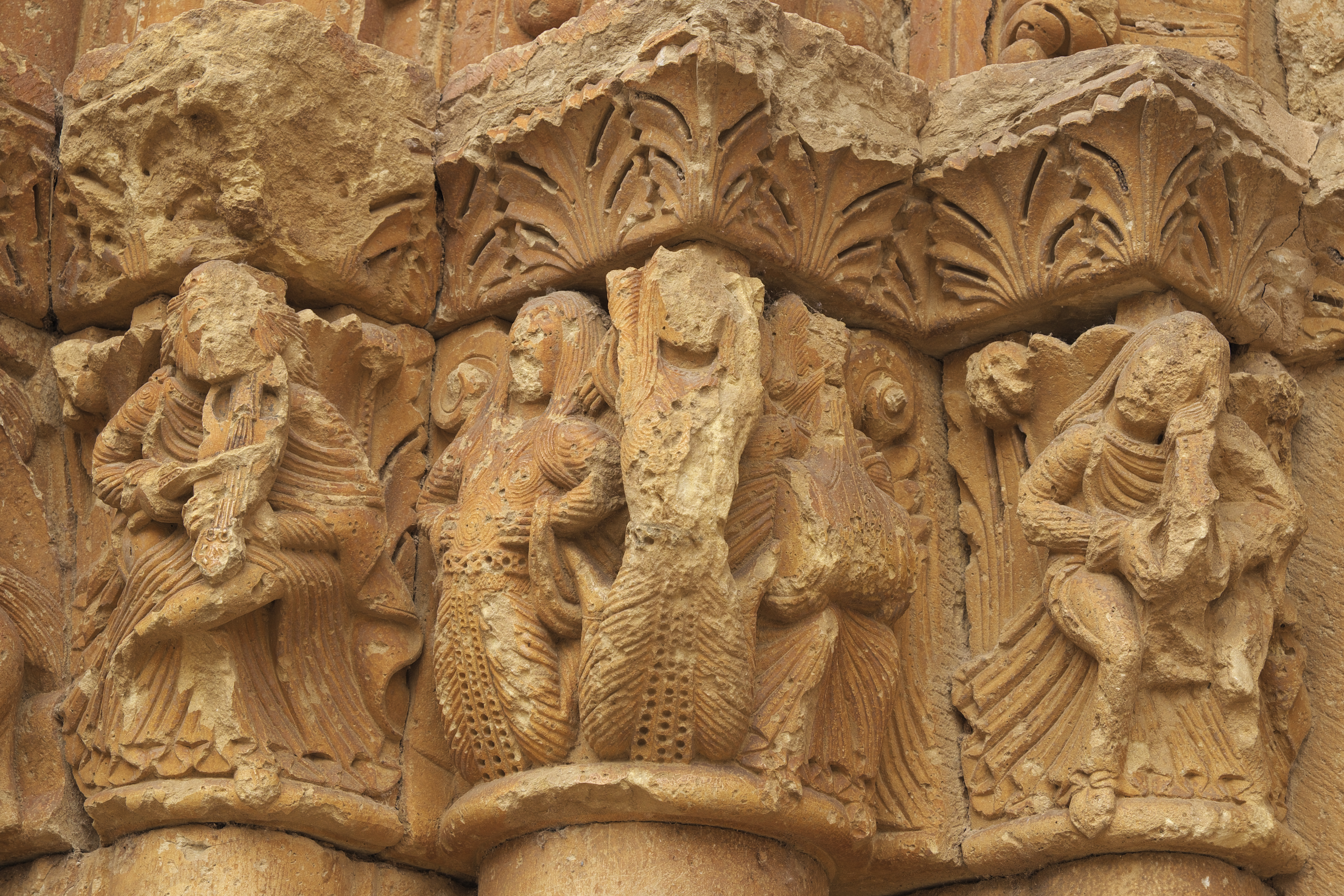
St John the Baptist church capital: Dancers and Musicians

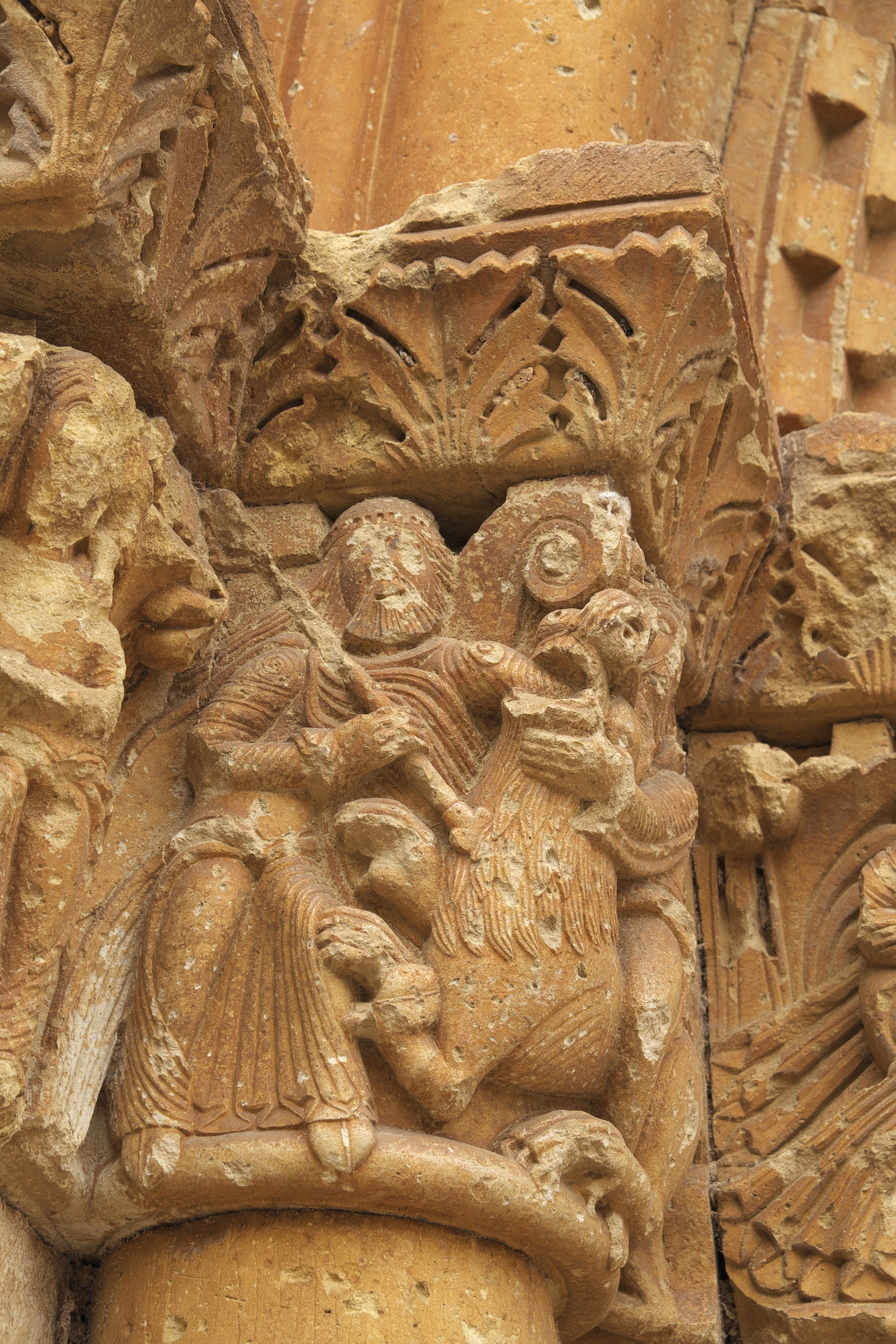
St John the Baptist Church capital: Daniel and the Lion

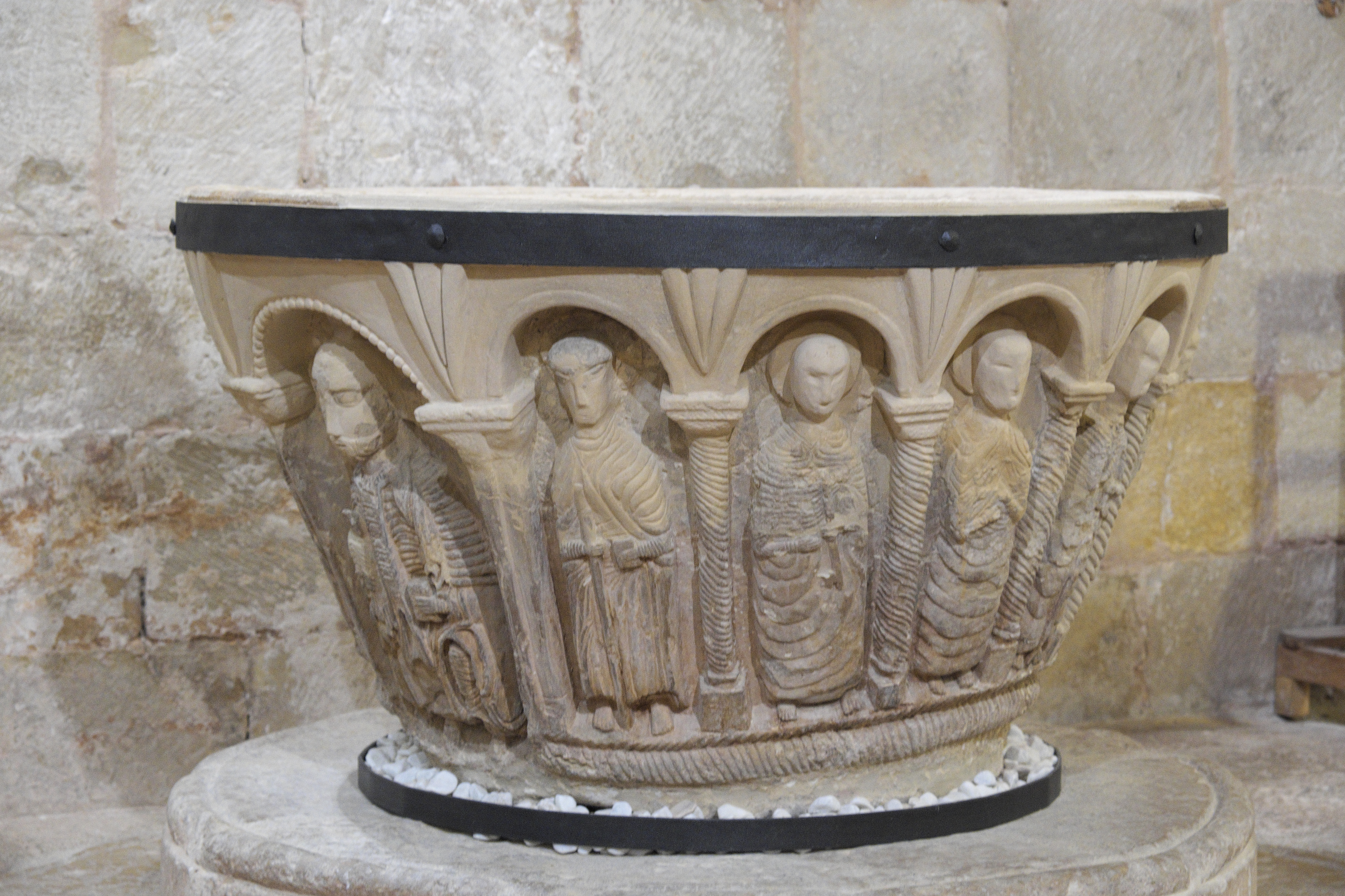
Baptismal font, St John the Baptist Church

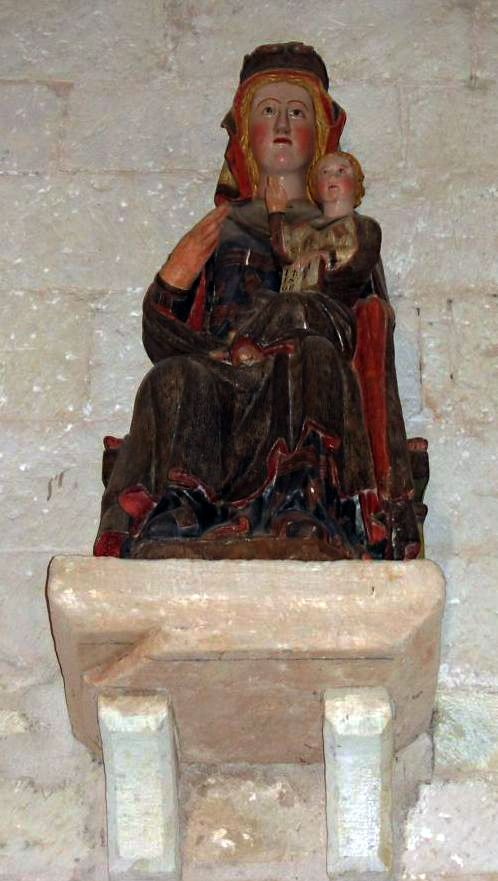
The Virgin and the Holy Child, Romanesque sculpture, St John the Baptist Church

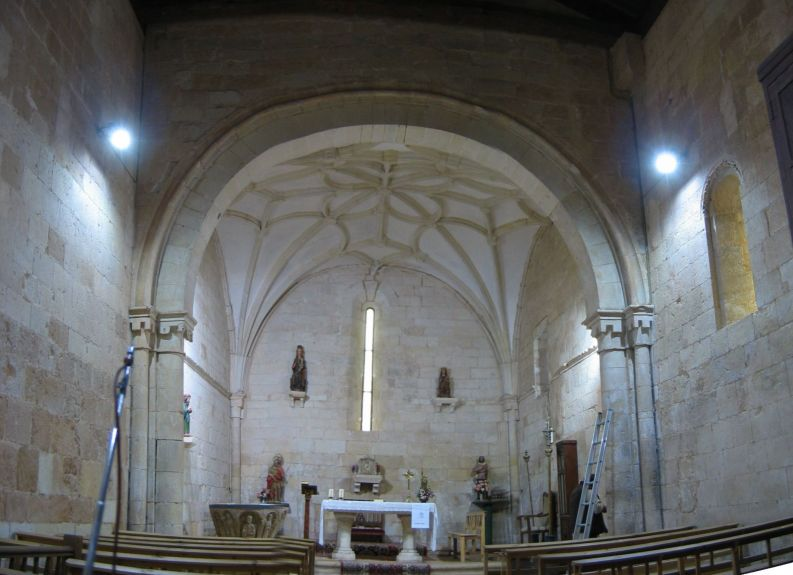
The inside of the St John the Baptist Church

== See also ==
- Province of Palencia
- Castile and León
- Romanesque art
