= San Jorde de Ojeda =

Coordinates: 42.62139°N 4.39483°W

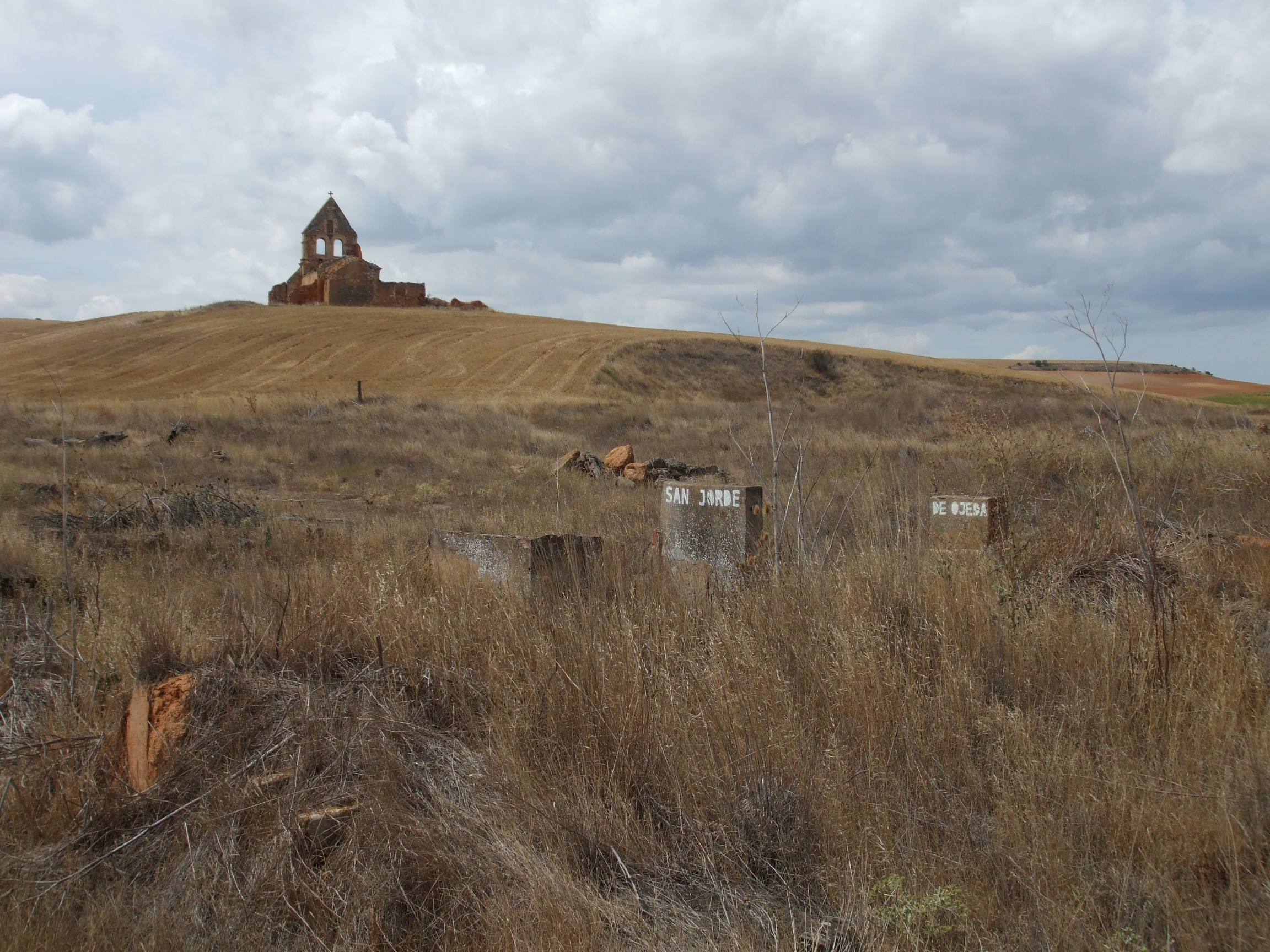
View of San Jorde de Ojeda with the Church in the background

San Jorde de Ojeda, also known as San Jorde, is an ancient, currently unoccupied, Spanish settlement in the province of Palencia (Castile and León autonomous community) in North-Western Spain. It belongs to the municipality of Prádanos de Ojeda.

== Etymology ==
The name San Jorde is a variation of the spelling of San Jorge (Saint George in English)

== History ==
The village of San Jorde de Ojeda once consisted of around five houses, a fountain and a small church. The church was constructed in the 13th century and remained in a good state of repair until 1975 when it was targeted by vandals and thieves who removed the Roman windows, the roof and large amounts of stone. The spire atop the building remains intact. Parts of the fountain still remain, but the ruins of the houses have largely disappeared.

== Current status ==
Following the abandonment of the settlement, only the ruins of the church remain. The ruins are listed in the Spanish "Lista Roja" of elements of Spanish heritage to be protected.
