= Prádanos de Ojeda =

Coordinates: 42°41′N 4°21′W

- municipality
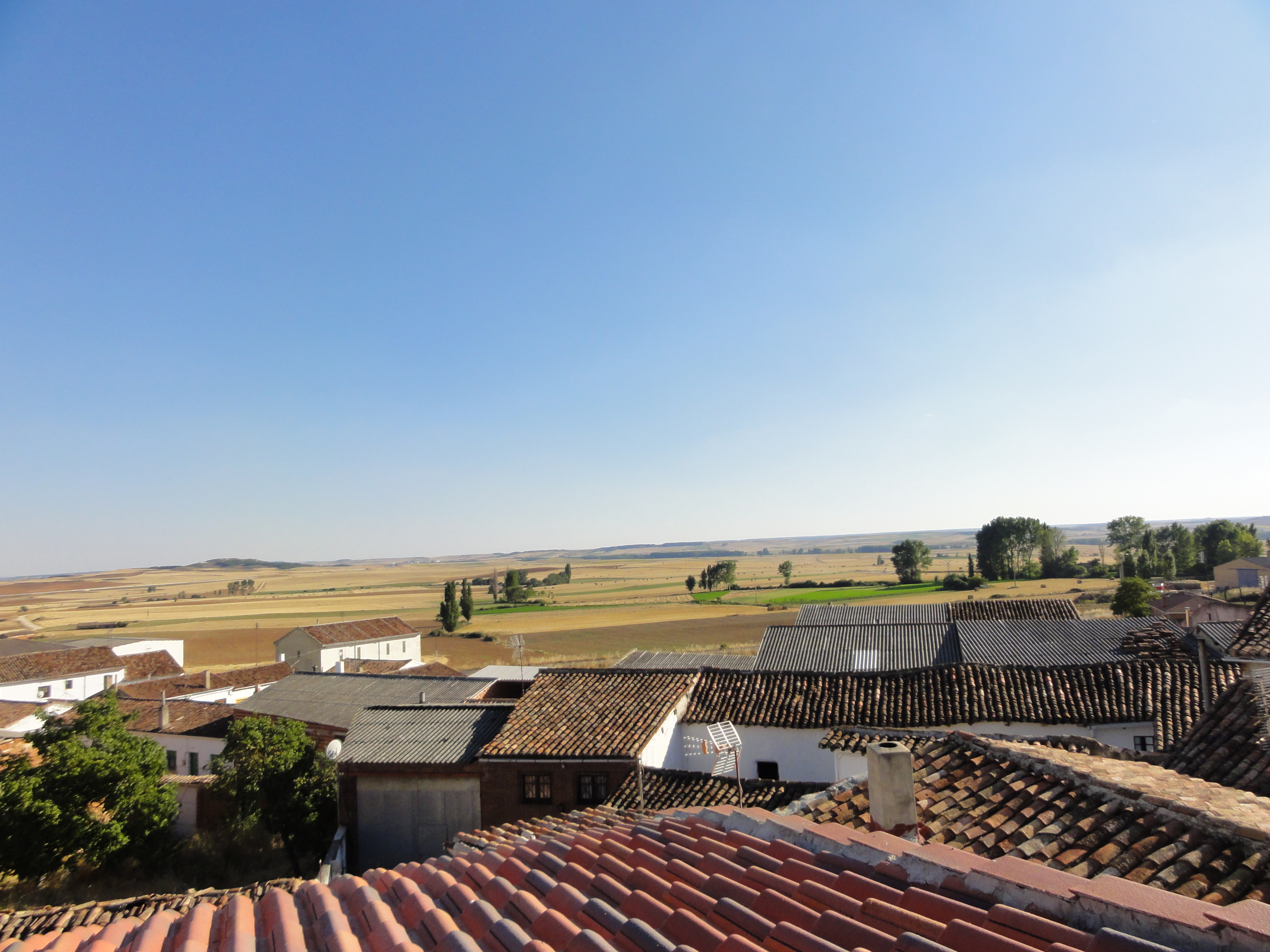
- Interactive map of Prádanos de Ojeda
- Country: Spain
- Autonomous community: Castile and León
- Province: Palencia

Area
  - Total: 21 km^{2} (8.1 sq mi)

Population (2025-01-01)
  - Total: 181
  - Density: 8.6/km^{2} (22/sq mi)
- Time zone: UTC+1 (CET)
  - Summer (DST): UTC+2 (CEST)
- Website: Official website

Prádanos de Ojeda is a municipality located in the province of Palencia, Castile and León, Spain. According to the 2004 census (INE), the municipality has a population of 218 inhabitants.

An ancient site, San Jorde, is located in the municipality.
