= Revilla de Collazos =

Coordinates: 42°38′N 4°30′W

- municipality
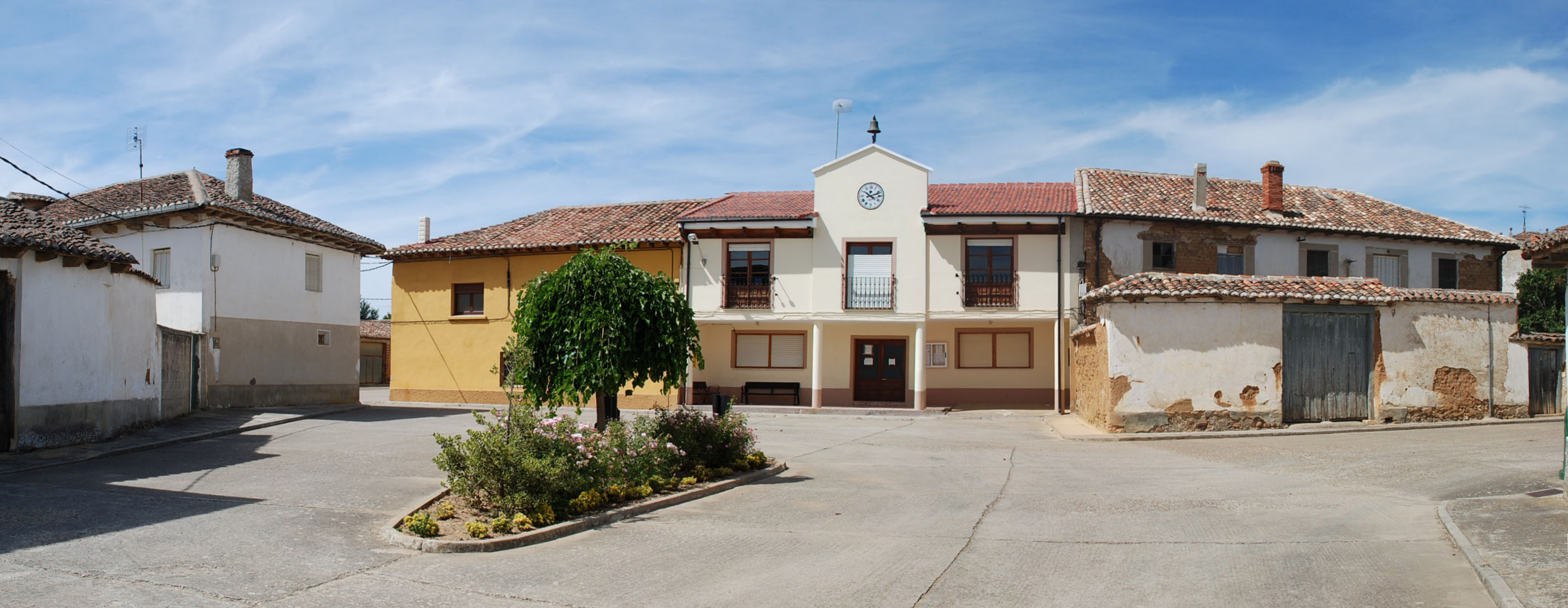
- Interactive map of Revilla de Collazos
- Country: Spain
- Autonomous community: Castile and León
- Province: Palencia

Area
  - Total: 20 km^{2} (7.7 sq mi)

Population (2025-01-01)
  - Total: 75
  - Density: 3.8/km^{2} (9.7/sq mi)
- Time zone: UTC+1 (CET)
  - Summer (DST): UTC+2 (CEST)
- Website: Official website

Revilla de Collazos is a municipality located in the province of Palencia, Castile and León, Spain. According to the 2004 census (INE), the municipality has a population of 79 inhabitants.
