= Dehesa de Cuéllar =

- Village
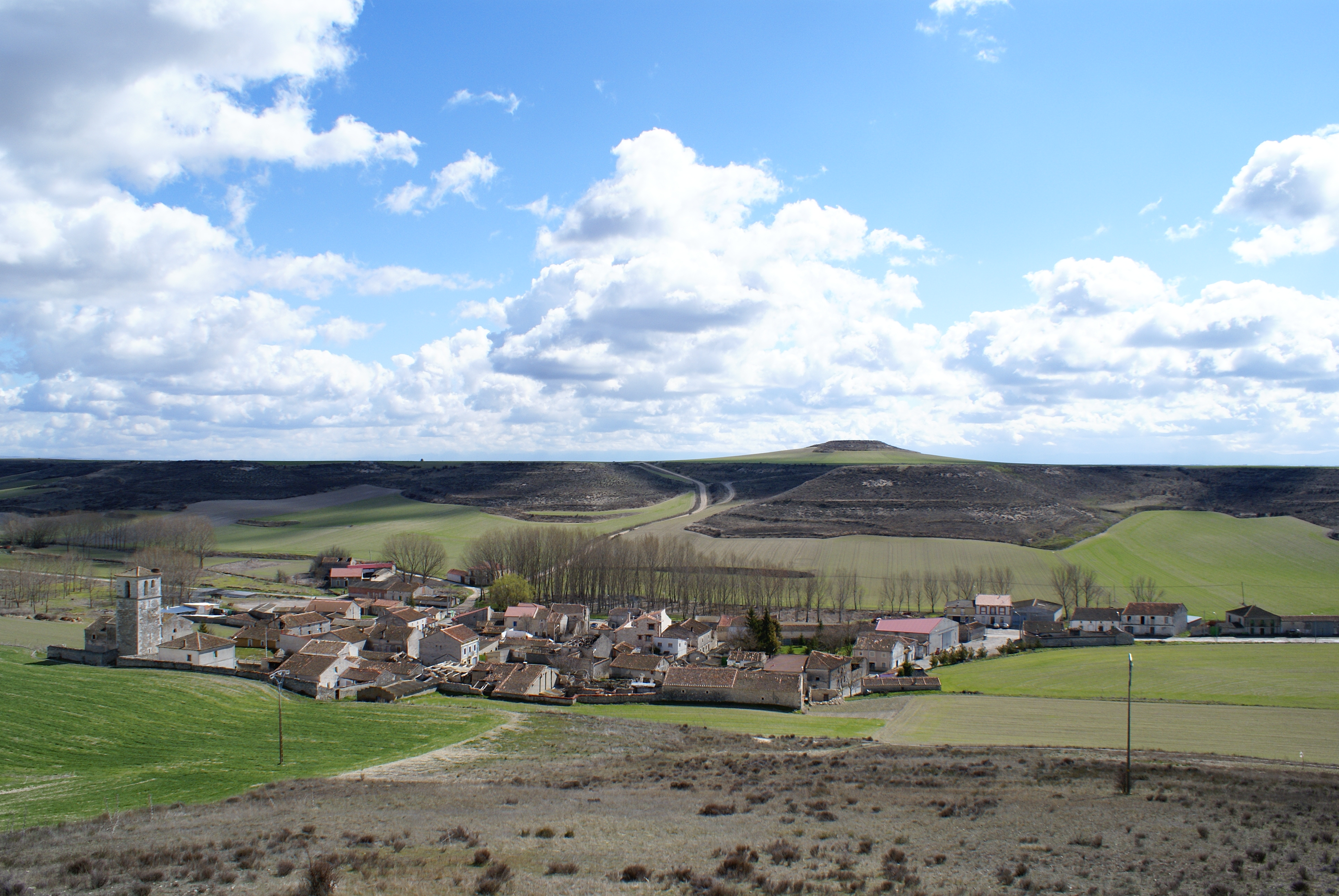
- View of Dehesa de Cuéllar

- Location within Castile and León Location within Spain
- Coordinates: 41°23′42″N 4°14′11″W
- Country: Spain
- Autonomous community: Castile and León
- Province: Segovia
- Municipality: Cuéllar

Population (2019)
  - Total: 33

Dehesa de Cuéllar is a hamlet in Cuéllar municipality, Segovia Province, Castile and León, Spain. As of 2019, its population was of 33 people.
