= Olmos de Ojeda =

Coordinates: 42°43′N 4°25′W

- municipality
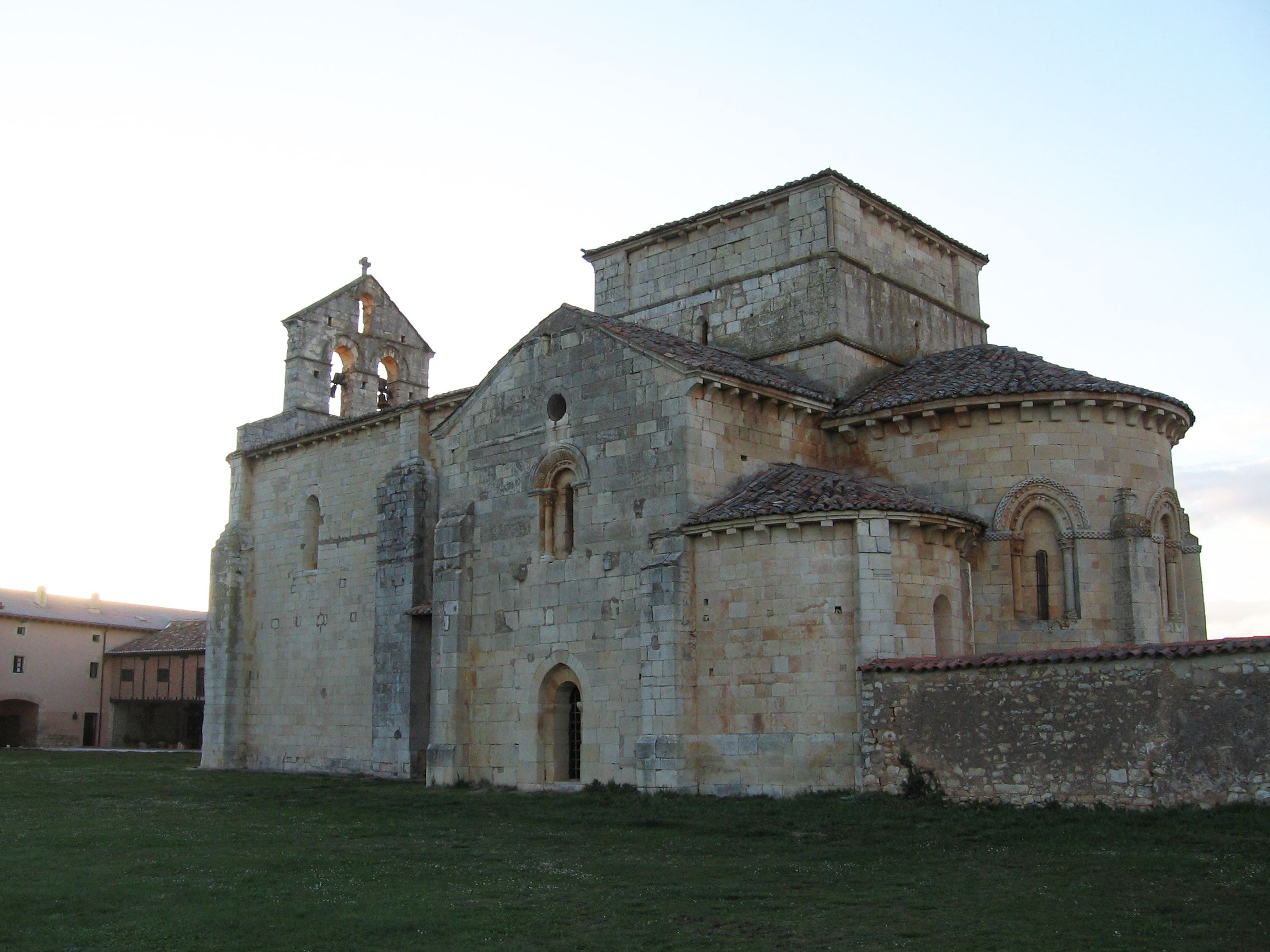
- Interactive map of Olmos de Ojeda
- Country: Spain
- Autonomous community: Castile and León
- Province: Palencia
- Municipality: Olmos de Ojeda

Area
  - Total: 103 km^{2} (40 sq mi)

Population (2025-01-01)
  - Total: 166
  - Density: 1.61/km^{2} (4.17/sq mi)
- Time zone: UTC+1 (CET)
  - Summer (DST): UTC+2 (CEST)
- Website: Official website

Olmos de Ojeda is a municipality located in the province of Palencia, Castile and León, Spain. According to the 2004 census (INE), the municipality has a population of 296 inhabitants.

== Localities ==
- Moarves de Ojeda
