= Payo de Ojeda =

Coordinates: 42°43′N 4°29′W

- municipality
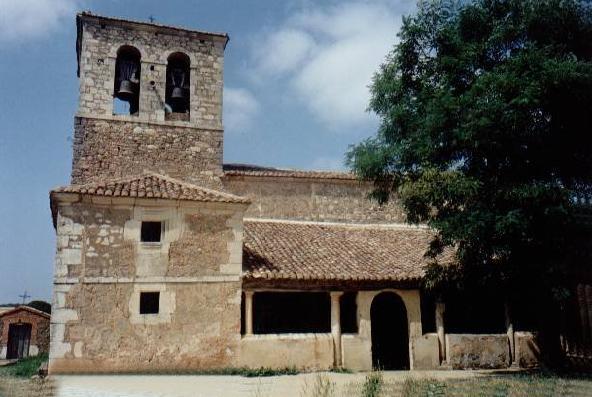
- Interactive map of Payo de Ojeda
- Country: Spain
- Autonomous community: Castile and León
- Province: Palencia
- Municipality: Payo de Ojeda

Area
  - Total: 19 km^{2} (7.3 sq mi)

Population (2025-01-01)
  - Total: 59
  - Density: 3.1/km^{2} (8.0/sq mi)
- Time zone: UTC+1 (CET)
  - Summer (DST): UTC+2 (CEST)
- Website: Official website

Payo de Ojeda is a municipality located in the province of Palencia, Castile and León, Spain. According to the 2004 census (INE), the municipality has a population of 86 inhabitants.
