= Francisco de la Dehesa =

Spanish sculptor

Francisco de la Dehesa was a Spanish sculptor in the 17th century.
