= Micieces de Ojeda =

Coordinates: 42°42′N 4°28′W

- municipality
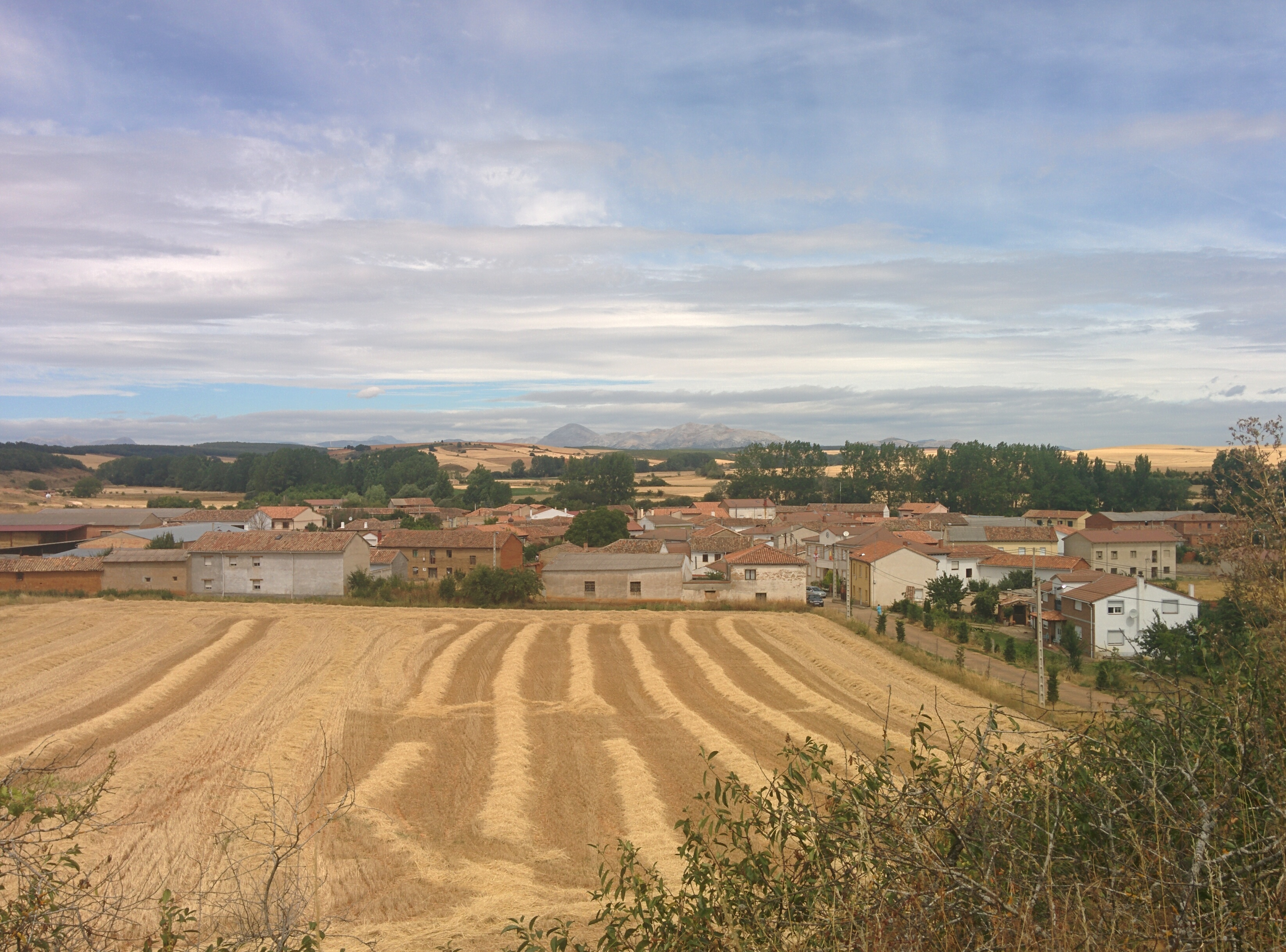
- Interactive map of Micieces de Ojeda
- Country: Spain
- Autonomous community: Castile and León
- Province: Palencia
- Municipality: Micieces de Ojeda

Area
  - Total: 20.73 km^{2} (8.00 sq mi)
- Elevation: 940 m (3,080 ft)

Population (2025-01-01)
  - Total: 67
  - Density: 3.2/km^{2} (8.4/sq mi)
- Time zone: UTC+1 (CET)
  - Summer (DST): UTC+2 (CEST)
- Website: Official website

Micieces de Ojeda (Spanish pronunciation: [miˈθjeθes ðe oˈxeða]) is a municipality located in the province of Palencia, Castile and León, Spain. According to the 2004 census (INE), the municipality had a population of 104 inhabitants.
