= La Vid de Ojeda =

- municipality
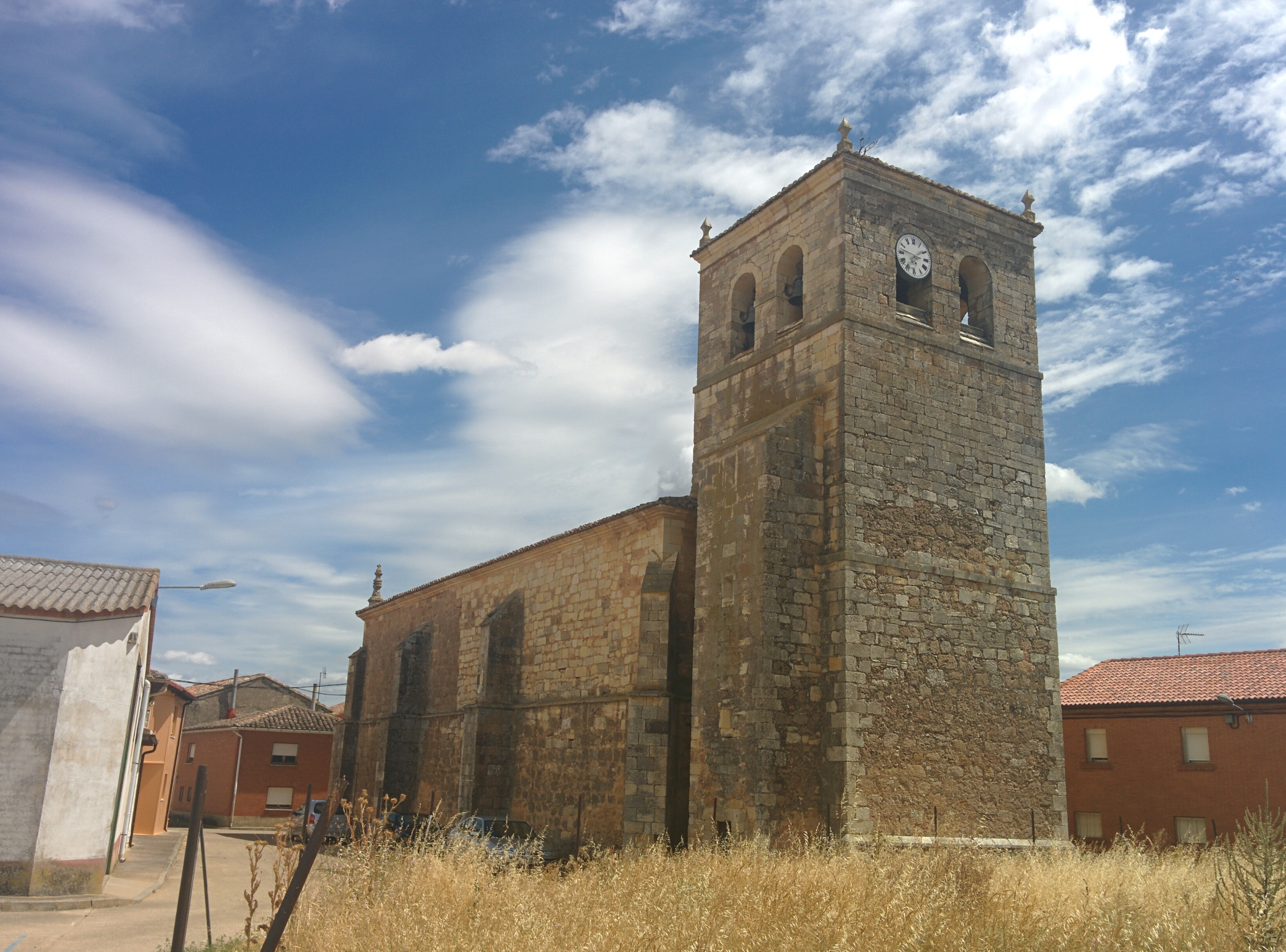
- Interactive map of La Vid de Ojeda
- Coordinates: 42.6667°N 4.3833°W
- Country: Spain
- Autonomous community: Castile and León
- Province: Palencia
- Municipality: La Vid de Ojeda

Area
  - Total: 20.08 km^{2} (7.75 sq mi)
- Elevation: 870 m (2,850 ft)

Population (2025-01-01)
  - Total: 82
  - Density: 4.1/km^{2} (11/sq mi)
- Time zone: UTC+1 (CET)
  - Summer (DST): UTC+2 (CEST)
- Website: Official website

La Vid de Ojeda is a municipality located in the province of Palencia, Castile and León, Spain. According to the 2004 census (INE), the municipality had a population of 130 inhabitants.
