= Dehesa de Romanos =

Coordinates: 42°38′N 4°26′W

- municipality
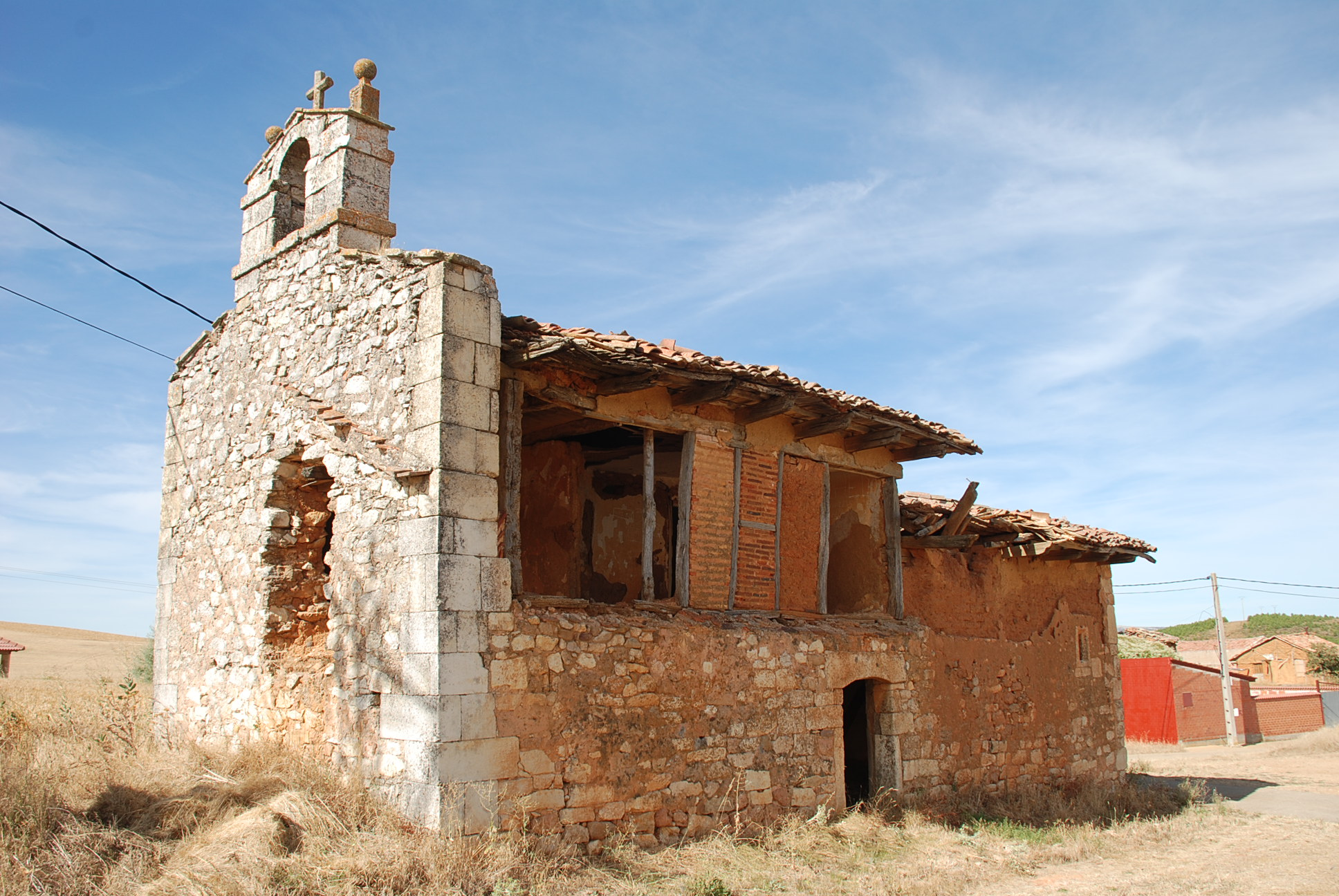
- Interactive map of Dehesa de Romanos
- Country: Spain
- Autonomous community: Castile and León
- Province: Palencia
- Municipality: Dehesa de Romanos

Area
  - Total: 20 km^{2} (7.7 sq mi)

Population (2025-01-01)
  - Total: 39
  - Density: 2.0/km^{2} (5.1/sq mi)
- Time zone: UTC+1 (CET)
  - Summer (DST): UTC+2 (CEST)
- Website: Official website

Dehesa de Romanos is a municipality located in the province of Palencia, Castile and León, Spain. According to the 2004 census (INE), the municipality has a population of 47 inhabitants.
