= Báscones de Ojeda =

Coordinates: 42°40′N 4°31′W

- municipality
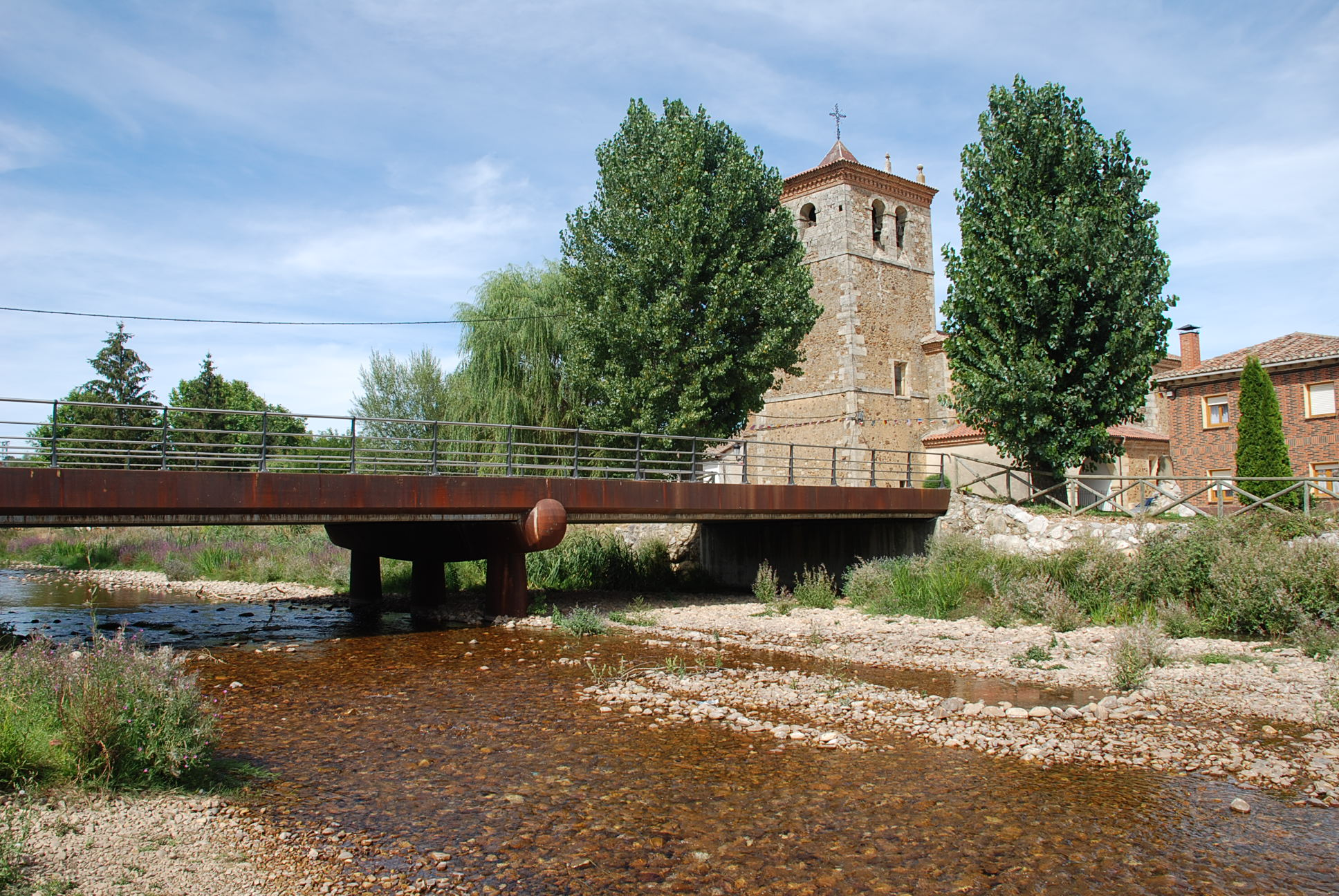

- Coat of arms
- Interactive map of Báscones de Ojeda
- Country: Spain
- Autonomous community: Castile and León
- Province: Palencia
- Municipality: Báscones de Ojeda

Area
  - Total: 18 km^{2} (6.9 sq mi)

Population (2025-01-01)
  - Total: 136
  - Density: 7.6/km^{2} (20/sq mi)
- Time zone: UTC+1 (CET)
  - Summer (DST): UTC+2 (CEST)
- Website: Official website

Báscones de Ojeda is a municipality located in the province of Palencia, Castile and León, Spain. According to the 2018 census (INE), the municipality has a population of 144 inhabitants.
