= La Vijanera =

Annual fiesta in Molledo, Cantabria, Spain

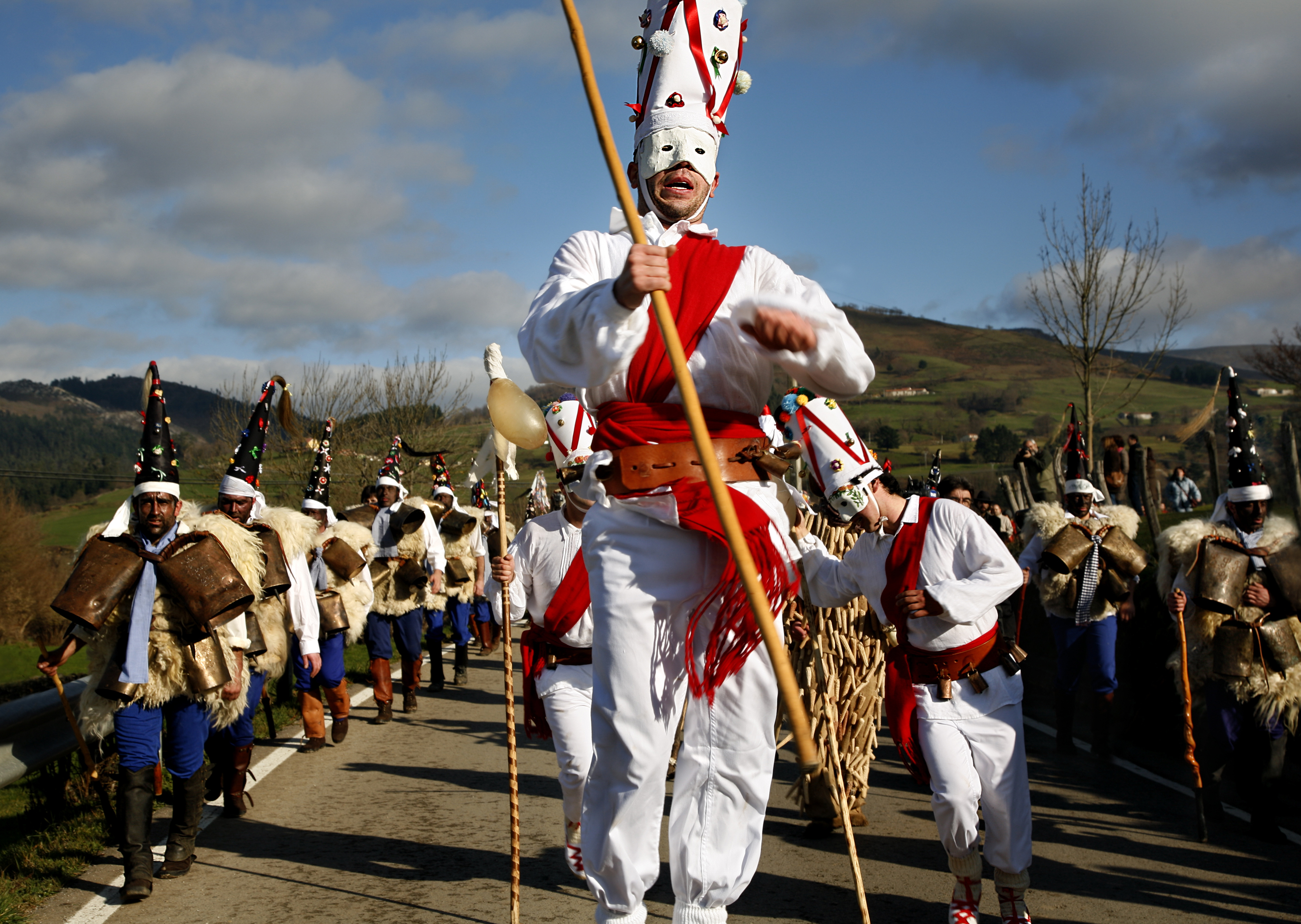
The Vijanera masquerade, of pre-Roman origin, is the living example of the survival of archaic cults to nature in Cantabria.

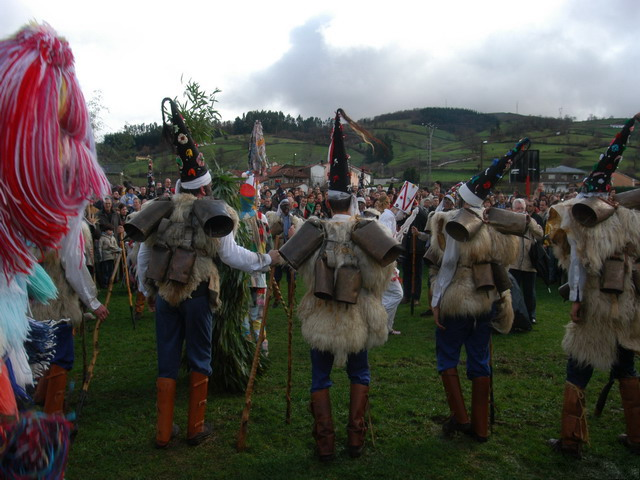
Los Zarramacos, warriors of the good, singing the songs.

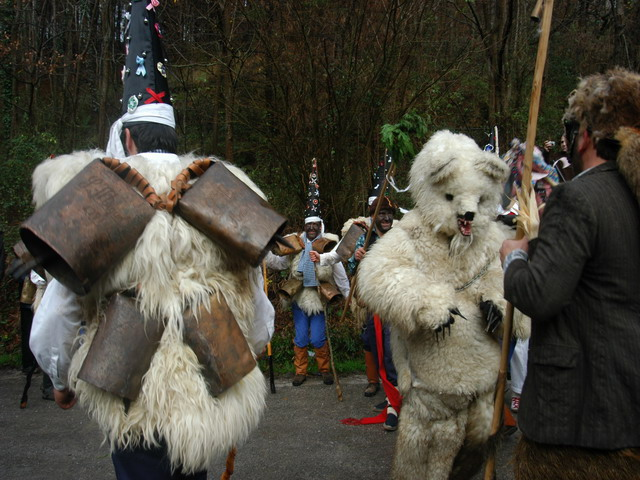
The Oso of La Vijanera, embodiment of the evil.

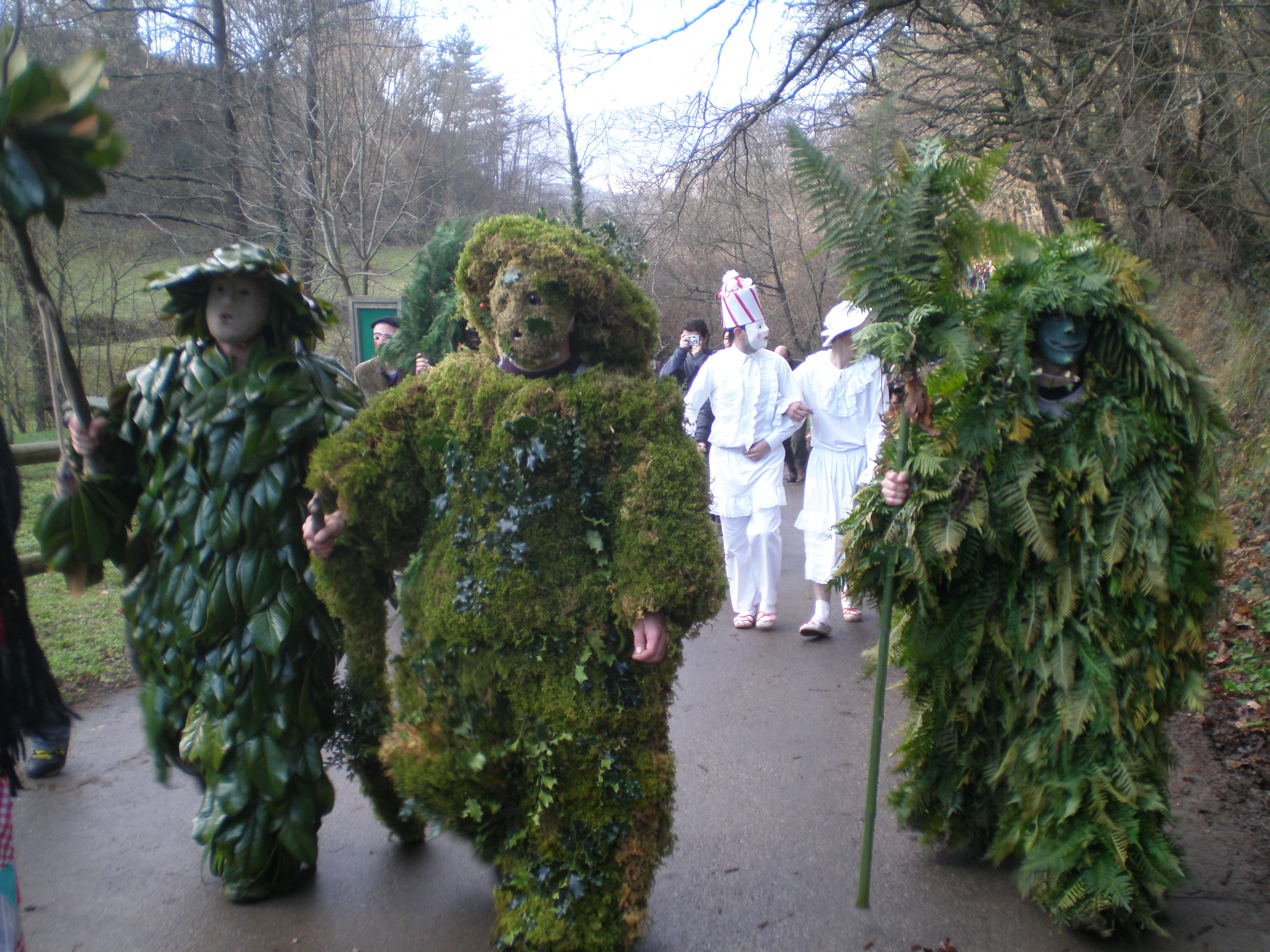
The Trapajones, entities of the nature.

La Vijanera is a fiesta of festive nature that takes place in the town of Silió (Molledo), Cantabria (Spain) on the first Sunday of each year. Due to its popularity and tradition, it has been declared a Fiesta of National Tourist Interest.

== The fiesta ==
Originally, La Vijanera was celebrated in the valleys of Iguña, Toranzo, Trasmiera, Campoo and Polaciones but now the only place in the region where it is just Silió. The first carnival of the year in Europe is a colorful masquerade involving approximately 60 characters (all male), la madama, el mancebo, los trapajones, el oso and su dueño, el pasiego, el caballero, la Pepa or Pepona, el médico, el domador, el húngaro, el viejo and la vieja, all dressed in a colorful and own function and symbolism.

But the real stars of the festival are los zarramacos because of the importance of their role. These are people dressed in sheepskins and weevils hats in addition to carrying the face painted black that will ward off the evil spirits during the year that jingling bells that are tied to the body. Its mission is to expel these spirits of the town coming up to the limits, tradition that points to much more ancient probably from the Roman times.

The second part of the celebration is to review the year end. The Vijaneros waiters gather at the town square and read some verses that, in popular language and tones ranging from jocularity to the cruelty, analyze what happened in the past year from local to international.

The fiesta ends with two acts, first produced "la Preñá", ie the calve or birth of the new year. After that, La Vijanera concludes with the death of the Bear, which symbolizes the victory of good over evil and the desire of good intentions for the new year.

As can be seen in this fiesta represents the desire to banish the last year and pave the way to the next year to begin with enthusiasm and good wishes. Perhaps because of this that the Roman god Janus is responsible for chairing La Vijanera. In fact, Janus in Latin derives from Jauna, ie gate, so it may want to mean "gate between two years" if it consider the prefix vi-(bi-, two).

As an incentive to the celebration itself, in recent editions has established a photography prize. On the other hand, are plans to build a Museum about the holiday in Silió, among other things contain images of the party. Both initiatives have been promoted by the Asociación de Amigos de la Vijanera, head of the organization and retrieval of this event for more than 25 years after its disappearance in Francoist Spain.

== See also ==
- Fiestas of National Tourist Interest of Spain
- Pre-Christian Alpine traditions
