= Francisco González Gómez =

Spanish caricaturist, painter and sculptor (1918–1990)

- Born: 1918; Santander, Cantabria, Spain
- Died: 7 March 1990 (aged 71–72); Santander, Cantabria, Spain
- Children: 1

Francisco González Gómez (Santander, 1918 – 7 March 1990) was a Spanish caricaturist, painter and sculptor, considered in his time as having re-invented caricature in Spain.
