= European University of the Atlantic =

Private university in Santander, Spain

Coordinates: 43.4518°N 3.8759°W

- Universidad Europea del Atlántico
- Motto: Ex veritate lux, ex labore virtus
- Motto in English: "From truth, light; from work, virtue"
- Type: Private
- Established: 2013
- Affiliations: Fundación Universitaria Iberoamericana
- Rector: Rubén Calderón Iglesias
- Students: 1,300 (2017)
- Location: Santander, Cantabria, Spain
- Website: www.uneatlantico.es

The European University of the Atlantic (Spanish: Universidad Europea del Atlántico), or UNEATLANTICO, is a private Spanish university located in the Scientific and Technological Park of Cantabria (PCTCAN), in the city of Santander, Cantabria.

This academic institution opened on September 29, 2014, with 8 university degrees and 350 registered students. The different courses will be implemented gradually, year by year, until completing the first class of graduates from Universidad Europea del Atlántico (European University of the Atlantic) in the academic year 2017–2018.

All degrees from this university are adapted to the European Higher Education Area (Bologna Process). The Research and Industrial Technology Centre of Cantabria (CITICAN) is a part of this institution.

== History ==
The university was promoted by Fundación Universitaria Iberoamericana (FUNIBER). It was officially recognised by the Government of Spain on 5 July 2013. This project entailed an estimated private investment of €16.5 million, of which 14.5 million were destined for construction and the other 2 million for the establishment of the Research and Industrial Technology Centre of Cantabria (CITICAN), a foundation that was born to channel the academic institution’s R&D&I projects.

== Campus ==
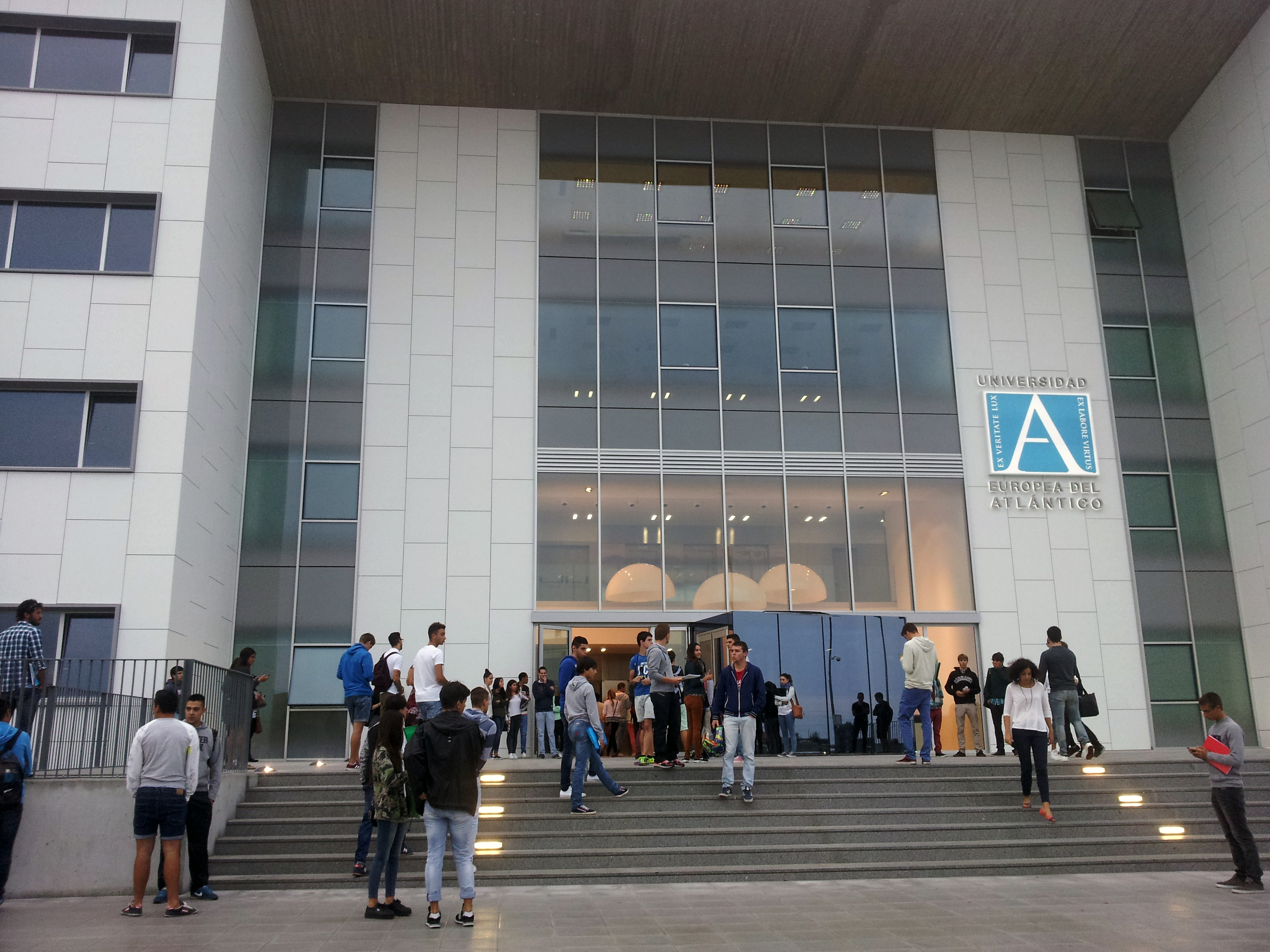
Main entrance to the European University of the Atlantic.

The Universidad Europea del Atlántico (European University of the Atlantic) campus is 16,500 m2 large and is located in the Scientific and Technological Park of Cantabria (PCTCAN), in the city of Santander.

The campus has an underground parking garage, an auditorium with capacity for 400 people, a library, a cafeteria, labs, computer rooms, study rooms, a gymnasium, and different multipurpose areas.

== Faculties and schools ==
The university's official programmes are organised into three faculties:

- Faculty of Health Sciences
- Higher Polytechnic School
- Faculty of Social Sciences and Humanities
