= Himno a la Montaña =

Anthem of Cantabria, Spain

English: Hymn to the Mountain
- Regional anthem of Cantabria, Spain
- Lyrics: Juan Guerrero Urresti
- Music: Juan Guerrero Urresti
- Adopted: 1987

Audio sample
- Official orchestral instrumental recording: file; help

"Himno a la Montaña" (Spanish pronunciation: [ˈimno a la monˈtaɲa], "Hymn to the Mountain"), or "Himno de Cantabria" ("Anthem of Cantabria"), is the official anthem of the Spanish autonomous community of Cantabria. It was composed in 1926 by Juan Guerrero Urresti at the behest of the then Provincial Council of Santander (Diputación Provincial de Santander), and subsequent arrangements were made by José del Río Sainz, establishing it as the region's official anthem.

== Lyrics ==
Spanish original

Cantabria querida
te voy a cantar
la canción que mi pecho
te va a dedicar
que es muy grande mi amor
a la tierra en que nací.

Quiero que sus sones
puedan traspasar
las montañas más altas
y el inmenso mar,
como ofrenda leal
al terruño en que viví.

Y es mi cántico amoroso
cual arrullo maternal
en que todos veneramos
la Cantabria fraternal.

Y un recuerdo cariñoso
de pureza regional,
a La Montaña dedico
con vigor tradicional,
𝄆 vigor tradicional. 𝄇

𝄆 Mi tierruca siempre ha de ser
bella aurora del corazón
y a ella un beso puro de amor
y lleno de emoción
siempre he de ofrecer. 𝄇

Hijos de mi Cantabria
nobles de mi querer,
hermanos montañeses
por siempre hemos de ser.

Juntos nos agrupemos
muy fuerte y muy leal
que la madre Cantabria
un abrazo nos da.

English translation

Dear Cantabria
I'll sing you
the song that my chest
will dedicate to you
since my love is so great
for the land where I was born.

I want its sounds
to cross over
the highest mountains
and the great sea,
as loyal offering
to the homeland where I lived.

And it is my loving song
like mother's lullaby
that we honor
brotherly Cantabria.

And a fond remembrance
of this unspoiled land
to The Mountain I dedicate
with the strength of tradition
𝄆 strength of tradition. 𝄇

𝄆 My homeland will always be
a beautiful glow in my heart
and a pure kiss of love
full of devotion
I have always to offer her. 𝄇

Sons of my Cantabria
my dear gentlemen
Brothers of The Mountain
we will be forever.

We stand together
strong and loyal
as mother Cantabria
embraces us.

== See also ==
- Anthems of the autonomous communities of Spain
