= Herrerías =

- Municipality
- Flag Coat of arms

- Location of Herrerías

- Location in Spain Herrerías (Spain)
- Coordinates: 43°18′56″N 4°27′53″W
- Country: Spain
- Autonomous community: Cantabria
- Province: Cantabria
- Comarca: Western coast of Cantabria
- Judicial district: San Vicente de la Barquera
- Capital: Bielva

Government
  - Alcalde: Juan Francisco Linares Buenaga (2007) (PRC)

Area
  - Total: 40.34 km^{2} (15.58 sq mi)
- Elevation: 188 m (617 ft)

Population (2025-01-01)
  - Total: 570
  - Density: 14/km^{2} (37/sq mi)
- Time zone: UTC+1 (CET)
  - Summer (DST): UTC+2 (CEST)
- Website: Official website

Herrerías (Spanish pronunciation: [e.re.ˈɾi.as]) is a municipality located in the autonomous community of Cantabria, Spain. According to the 2007 census, the city has a population of 715 inhabitants.

== Towns ==
- Bielva (capital)
- Cabanzón
- Cades
- Camijanes
- Casamaría
- Puente el Arrudo
- Rábago
