= Valdáliga =

Coordinates: 43°19′45″N 4°20′57″W

- Coat of arms

- Location in Spain.
- Country: Spain
- Autonomous community: Cantabria

Area
  - Total: 97.76 km^{2} (37.75 sq mi)
- Elevation: 50 m (160 ft)

Population (2025-01-01)
  - Total: 2,135
  - Density: 21.84/km^{2} (56.56/sq mi)
- Time zone: UTC+1 (CET)
  - Summer (DST): UTC+2 (CEST)
- Website: www.aytovaldaliga.org

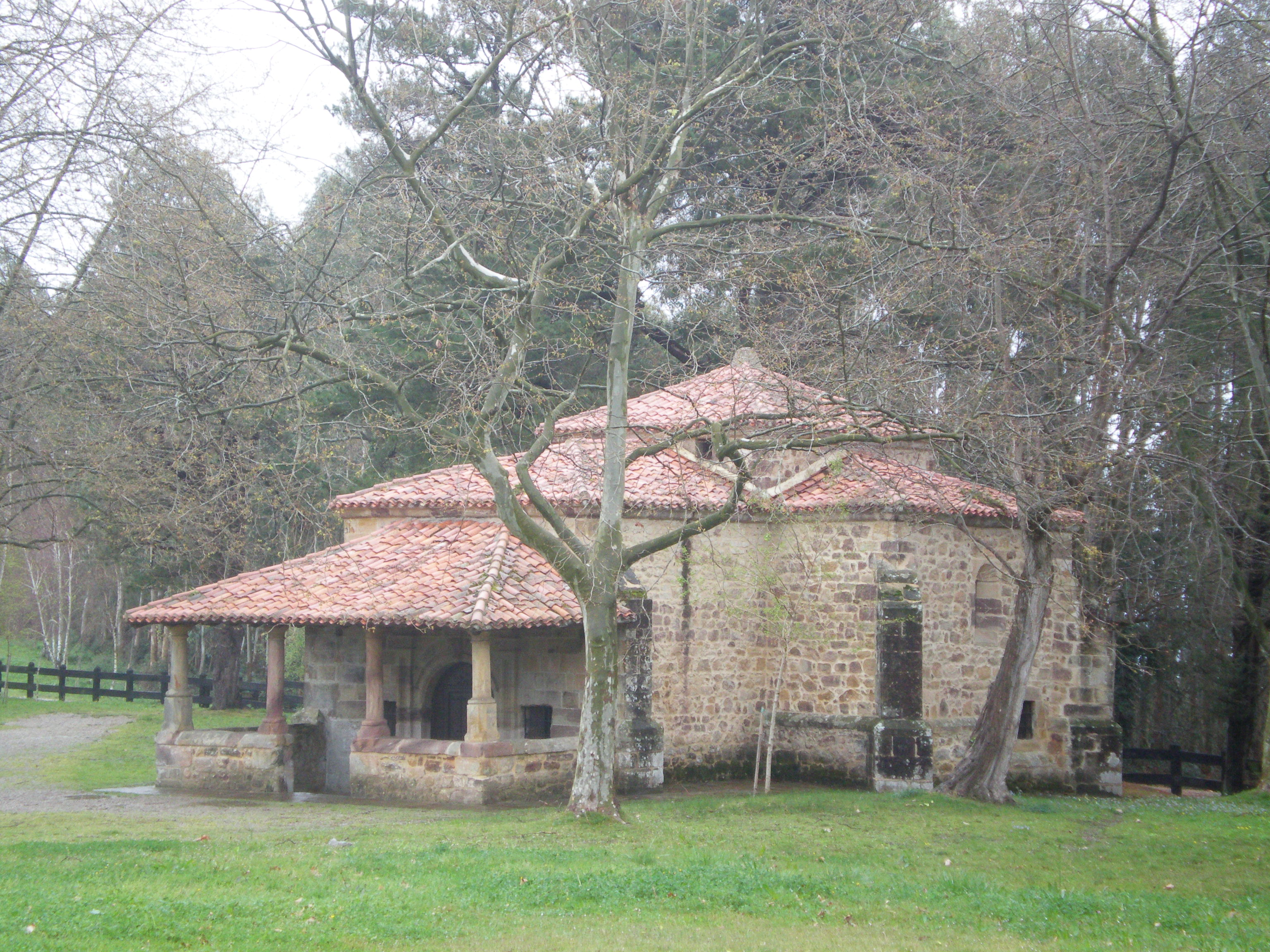
Hermitage of San Antonio in Valdáliga, Spain.

Valdáliga is a municipality in Cantabria, Spain.
