= Ruente =

Coordinates: 43.2594°N 4.2661°W

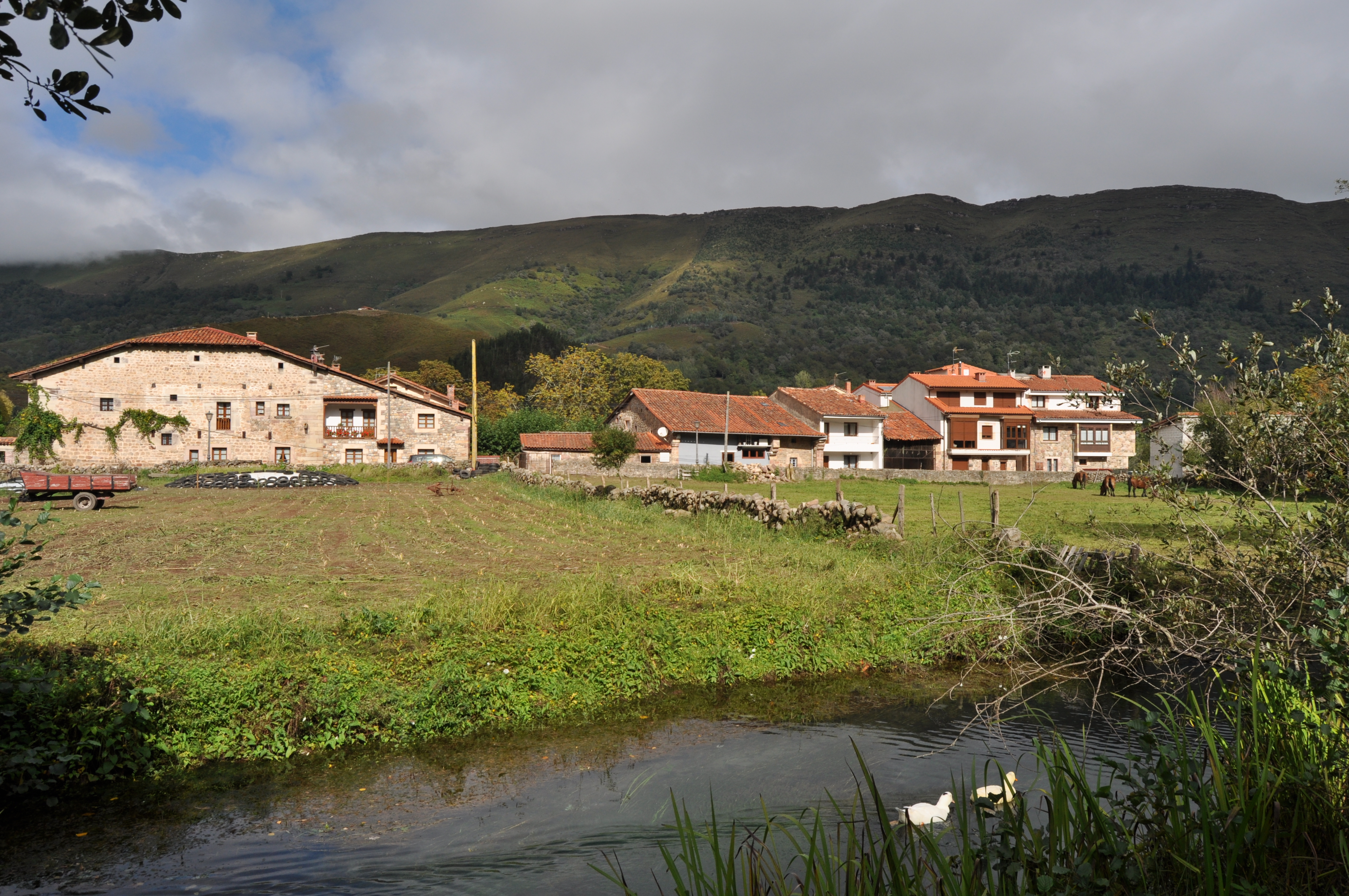
- View of Ruente

- Coat of arms

- Location in Spain.
- Country: Spain
- Autonomous community: Cantabria

Area
  - Total: 65.86 km^{2} (25.43 sq mi)
- Elevation: 190 m (620 ft)

Population (2025-01-01)
  - Total: 1,083
  - Density: 16.44/km^{2} (42.59/sq mi)
- Time zone: UTC+1 (CET)
  - Summer (DST): UTC+2 (CEST)
- Website: www.ruente.es

Ruente is a municipality in Cantabria, Spain. It is situated in the lowest part of the Cabuerniga valley and it is the biggest village in the zone.

== La Fuentona ==
Ruente is well known for its natural water source, La Fuentona, and the medieval bridge and modern park which are situated next to it.
