= Bolo palma =

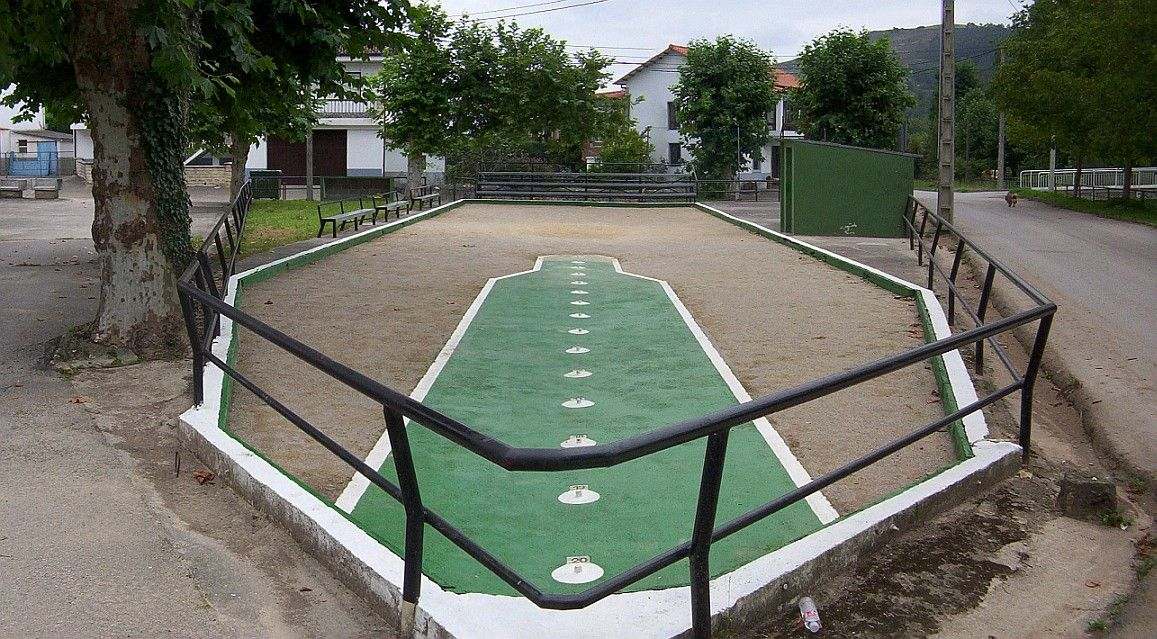
The tiro for bolo palma

Bolo palma is a variant of bowls that originated in and is played throughout the region of Cantabria, north of Spain. The basic aim of the game is to knock over as many pins as possible with a wooden ball. Records of the game go back as far as the 16th century. The game was also spread to neighbouring areas of eastern Asturias and northern Palencia. Cantabrian emigration also took the practice of the sport elsewhere in Spain, to places such as the Basque Country, Madrid, Catalonia and Andalusia and even to other countries like Mexico, Argentina, Chile and Venezuela.

== The set-up ==
The playing field or bolera is between 30–34 m long and 8 m wide and roughly split into three areas, the zona de tiro (launch zone), the middle area or caja or zona de bolos (pin zone) and the zona de birle (snatching zone) . The ball itself is spherical, about 12–18 cm in diameter and made of oak, sometimes with a lead centre to make the ball heavier. It usually weighs between 1.5-2.3 kg.

The first section is the zona de tiro, the rectangular launching zone 8 m wide and 20 m long from where the players launch the ball. There are circles on the ground called tiros, which mark different foot positions for the players.

The caja straddles the zona de tiro and the zona de birle at the far end. It also has a borderline to its front called fleje. Here, there are 9 wooden bolos (pins), made out of birch or hazel, with a metal base (argolla or anilla), about 45 cm tall and 5 cm diameter, weighing between 550-630 g. These are placed on pegs in a 3x3 square exactly straddling both zonas. There is also a tenth pin called emboque or cachi which is smaller and off to one side.

The third section is the zona de birle, a 12m long area where the second phase of the game is played.

== The game ==
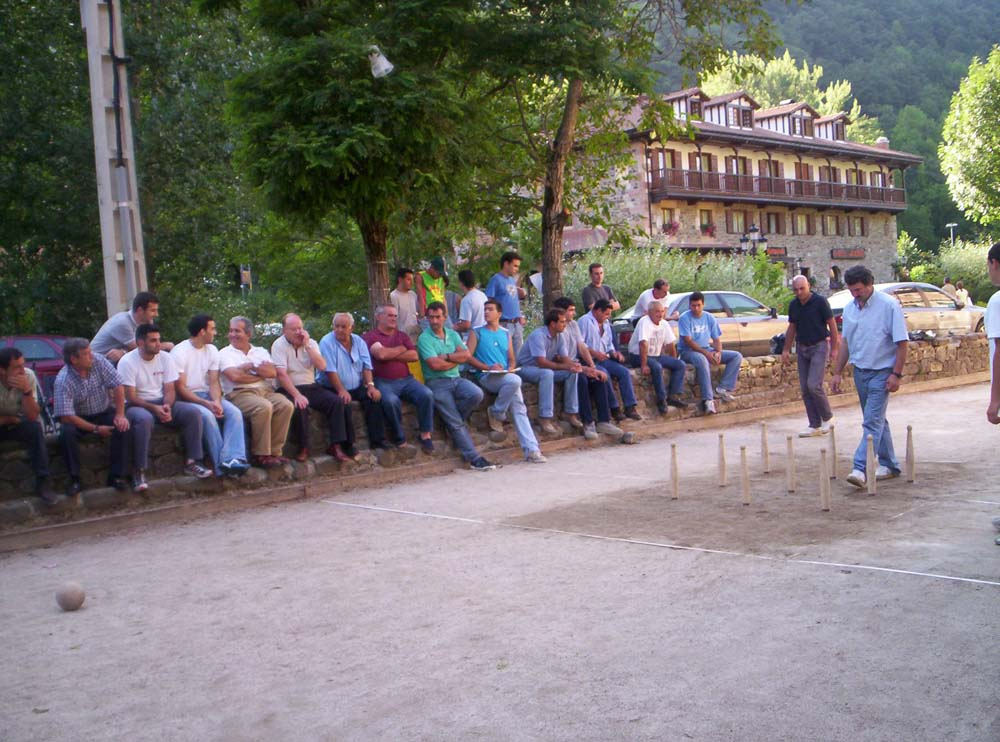
Playing bolo palma

Every game consists of two phases:

- Tiro: the shot, where the player launches the ball from the launching area.
- Birle: the second shot where the player is allowed to launch the ball again from the position it landed in the tiro.

In the first phase, the player stands on the tiro, at least 12m and at most 20m away from the nearest pin depending on the distance selected. The player then launches the ball upwards into the air, employing a number of different techniques depending on whether the emboque is to the left or the right of the caja.

Any pin knocked over is worth one point but if only the central pin is knocked over, two points are won. After having thrown three balls, the player passes over to the zona de birle. They are then allowed to bowl the three balls again from where they fell in the first throw, a move called birlar. If a ball comes to rest very close to two pins, a special move called segar is made in which the player knocks over the close pins while aiming for others.

A bola queda is a bad ball that cannot be rethrown. The most common causes of a bad ball is a ball that touches the ground before crossing the fleje, a ball that lands on the fleje, when the ball does not cross the line of the emboque and when the ball first touches the ground to the right or left of the caja

There are a number of ways in which this game can be won, either by reaching an agreed number of knocked over pins (usually between 20 and 40), by throwing eight balls and meeting a variety of challenges and so on.
