= Cantabria =

Autonomous community and province of Spain

- Autonomous community and province
- Flag Coat of arms
- Anthem: Himno a la Montaña (in English: Anthem to the Mountain)
- Location of Cantabria within Spain
- Interactive map of Cantabria
- Coordinates: 43°20′N 4°00′W
- Country: Spain
- Formation: 574 (Duchy of Cantabria); 739 (Union with Asturias); 1778 (Province of Cantabria); 1833 (Province of Santander); 1982 (Autonomous Community)
- Statute of Autonomy: 1 February 1982
- Capital: Santander
- Municipalities: 102

Government
  - Type: Devolved government in a constitutional monarchy
  - Body: Gobierno de Cantabria
  - President: María José Sáenz de Buruaga (PP)
  - Legislature: Parliament of Cantabria

Area
  - Total: 5,330.20 km^{2} (2,058.00 sq mi)
  - Rank: 15th in Spain
- 1.1% of Spain

Population (2025)
  - Total: 593,623
  - Rank: 16th in Spain
  - Density: 111.370/km^{2} (288.446/sq mi)
- 1.2% of Spain
- Demonym(s): Cantabrian cántabro/a, montañés/a (es)

GDP
  - Total: €17.700 billion (2024)
  - Per capita: €29,848 (2024)
- Time zone: UTC+1 (CET)
  - Summer (DST): UTC+2 (CEST)
- ISO 3166 code: ES-CB
- Area code: +34 942 a
- Official languages: Spanish
- Statute of Autonomy: 11 January 1982
- Congress: 5 deputies (out of 350)
- Senate: 5 senators (out of 265)
- HDI (2022): 0.910 very high · 6th
- Website: Gobierno de Cantabria

Cantabria (/kænˈteɪbriə/, also UK: /-ˈtæb-/; Spanish: [kanˈtaβɾja]) is an autonomous community and province in northern Spain with Santander as its capital city. It is called a comunidad histórica, a historic community, in its current statute of autonomy.

Cantabria is bordered on the east by the Basque Country (the province of Biscay), on the south by Castile and León (provinces of León, Palencia, and Burgos), on the west by Asturias, and on the north by the Cantabrian Sea, which forms part of the Bay of Biscay. With a population of 593,623, it is the 4th least populous autonomous community of Spain.

Cantabria belongs to Green Spain, the name given to the strip of land between the Bay of Biscay and the Cantabrian Mountains, so named for its particularly lush vegetation, which results from its wet, temperate oceanic climate. The climate is strongly influenced by Atlantic Ocean winds trapped by the mountains; the average annual precipitation is about 1,200 mm (47 inches).

Cantabria has archaeological sites from the Upper Paleolithic period, although the first signs of human occupation date from the Lower Paleolithic. The most significant site for cave paintings is in the cave of Altamira, dating from about 37,000 BC and declared, along with nine other Cantabrian caves, as World Heritage Sites by UNESCO. It corresponds geographically to the territory of the Cantabri, hence 'Cantabria' in Latin, in the second half of the 1st millennium BCE, but from the late Middle Ages to the early 19th century, the term 'Cantabria' also referred to the territory of the Basques, especially the lordship of Biscay.

The modern province of Cantabria was constituted on 28 July 1778 at Puente San Miguel, Reocín. This event is celebrated yearly on July 28, known as the Day of the Institutions. The Organic Law of the Statute of Autonomy of Cantabria, approved on 30 December 1981, gave the region its own institutions of self-government.

== Etymology and usage ==
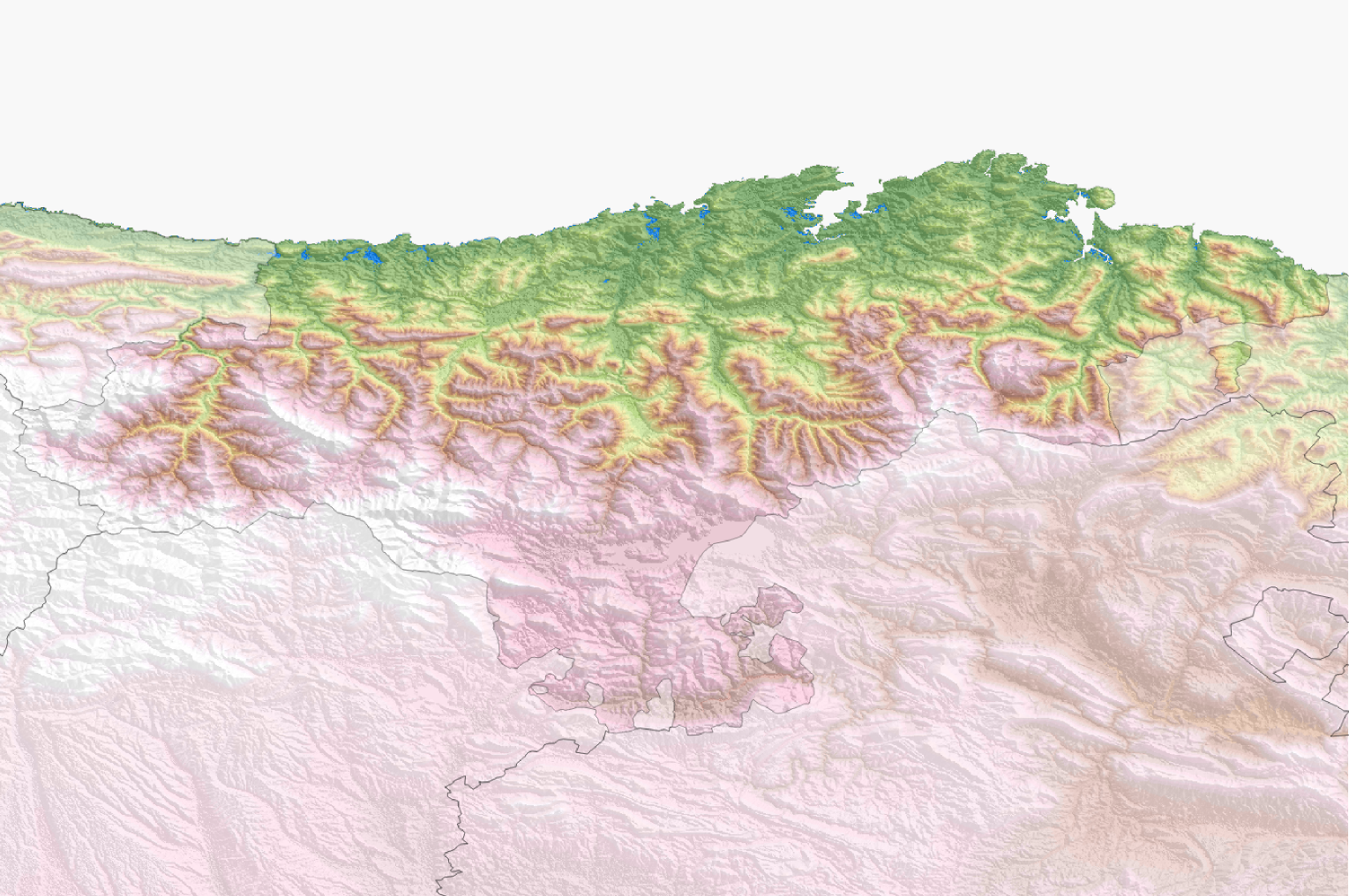
Topographical map of Cantabria.

Numerous authors, including Isidore of Seville, Julio Caro Baroja, Aureliano Fernández-Guerra and Adolf Schulten, have explored the etymology of the name Cantabria, yet its origins remain uncertain. The Online Etymology Dictionary states the root cant- is said to come from the Celtic for 'rock' or 'rocky', while -abr was a common suffix used in Celtic regions. Thus, Cantabrian could mean 'people who live in the rocks' or 'highlanders', a reference to the steep and mountainous territory of Cantabria.

The name Cantabria could also be related to the Celtic root kant or cant meaning 'edge' or 'rim' and thus 'coastal district' or 'corner-land', 'land on the edge', thus having the same probable derivation as the name of the English county of Kent and Canterbury, one of its major cities.

During the Spanish liberal regimes of the 19th century, the term came to be increasingly associated to the province of Santander. However, in late medieval and modern literature, Cantabria and Cantabrians refer to the Basque Country, especially the lordship of Biscay, and the Basques.

== History ==
=== Roman Empire ===
Language groups of Pre-Roman Iberia

Cantabria during the Cantabrian Wars – this map shows the borders of the Cantabrian territory relative to modern Cantabria as well as the different tribes who inhabited it, the neighboring towns, and geographic features with their Latin names

The first written reference to the name Cantabria emerges around 195 BC, in which the historian Cato the Elder speaks in his book Origines about the source of the Ebro River in the country of the Cantabri:

...The Ebro River starts in the land of the Cantabri, large and beautiful, with abundant fish...

— Cato the Elder, Origines: VII (Note: Latin: ...fluvium Hiberum; is oritur ex Cantabris; magnus atque pulcher, pisculentus...)

There are about 150 references to Cantabria or the Cantabri in surviving Greek and Latin texts. The Cantabri were used as mercenaries in various conflicts, both within the Iberian Peninsula and elsewhere. It is certain that they participated in the Second Punic War, from references by Silius Italicus and Horace. When C. Hostilius Mancinus was besieging Numantia, he withdrew upon learning that Cantabri and Vaccaei were present among his auxiliaries. The Cantabrian Wars began in 29 BC. They were defeated by Agrippa with great slaughter in 19 BC, but they revolted again under Tiberius and were never entirely subdued.

In older geographers, the term Cantabria referred to an expansive country bounded by the Cantabrian Sea (the Bay of Biscay), the western side of the Sella valley in Asturias, the hillfort of Peña Amaya in Burgos, and along the Aguera River almost as far as Castro Urdiales. It thus included areas of Asturias, Santander, Biscay, and Guipuzcoa. Following the Roman conquest of Spain, however, it was restricted to the area of Santander and eastern Asturias, forming a part of Hispania Tarraconensis ("Tarragonan Spain"). The principal tribes of the area were the Pleutauri, the Varduli, the Autrigones, the Tuisi, and the Conisci or Concaui, who were known for feeding on their horses' blood. (Note: Latin: ...laetum equino sanguine Concanum...) The area was well settled, with the largest city being Juliobriga, and the local mountains exploited for lead mines.

=== Middle Ages ===
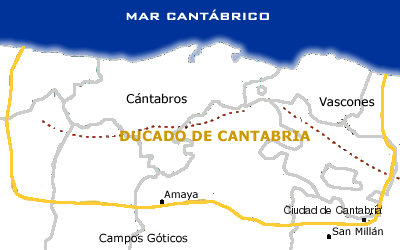
Borders of the Duchy of Cantabria

Following the collapse of the Roman Empire, Cantabria regained its independence from the rule of the Visigoths. In 574, King Liuvigild attacked Cantabria and managed to capture the south of the country, including the city of Amaya, where he established a Visigothic province called the Duchy of Cantabria (see picture), which would serve as a limes or frontier zone to contain the Cantabri as well as their neighbors the Vascones. To the north of this cordon, however, the Cantabri continued to live independently until the Arab invasion. In 714, a mixed Arab/Berber army of Muslim Moors invaded the upper valleys of the Ebro and succeeded in capturing Amaya, the Cantabrian capital, forcing the Cantabrians back to their traditional frontiers, where they joined forces with the Kingdom of Asturias. In the first chronicles of the Reconquista, Cantabria still appears to be acknowledged as a region. In the Albendense Chronicle, when speaking of Alfonso I, it says, "This was the son of Peter, the duke of Cantabria". (Note: Latin: ...iste Petri Cantabriae ducis filius fuit...)

During the 9th century, on mentioning the monastery of Saint Zacharias, in a letter sent to Wiliesind, bishop of Pamplona, Eulogius of Córdoba pinpoints it in Seburim (maybe Zubiri) on the river Arga, "waters all of Cantabria", suggesting a region stretching out far into the east. From this period on, source documents barely reference Cantabria by name, with Asturias featuring in names of the comarcas called Asturias de Santillana, Asturias de Trasmiera and Asturias de Laredo.

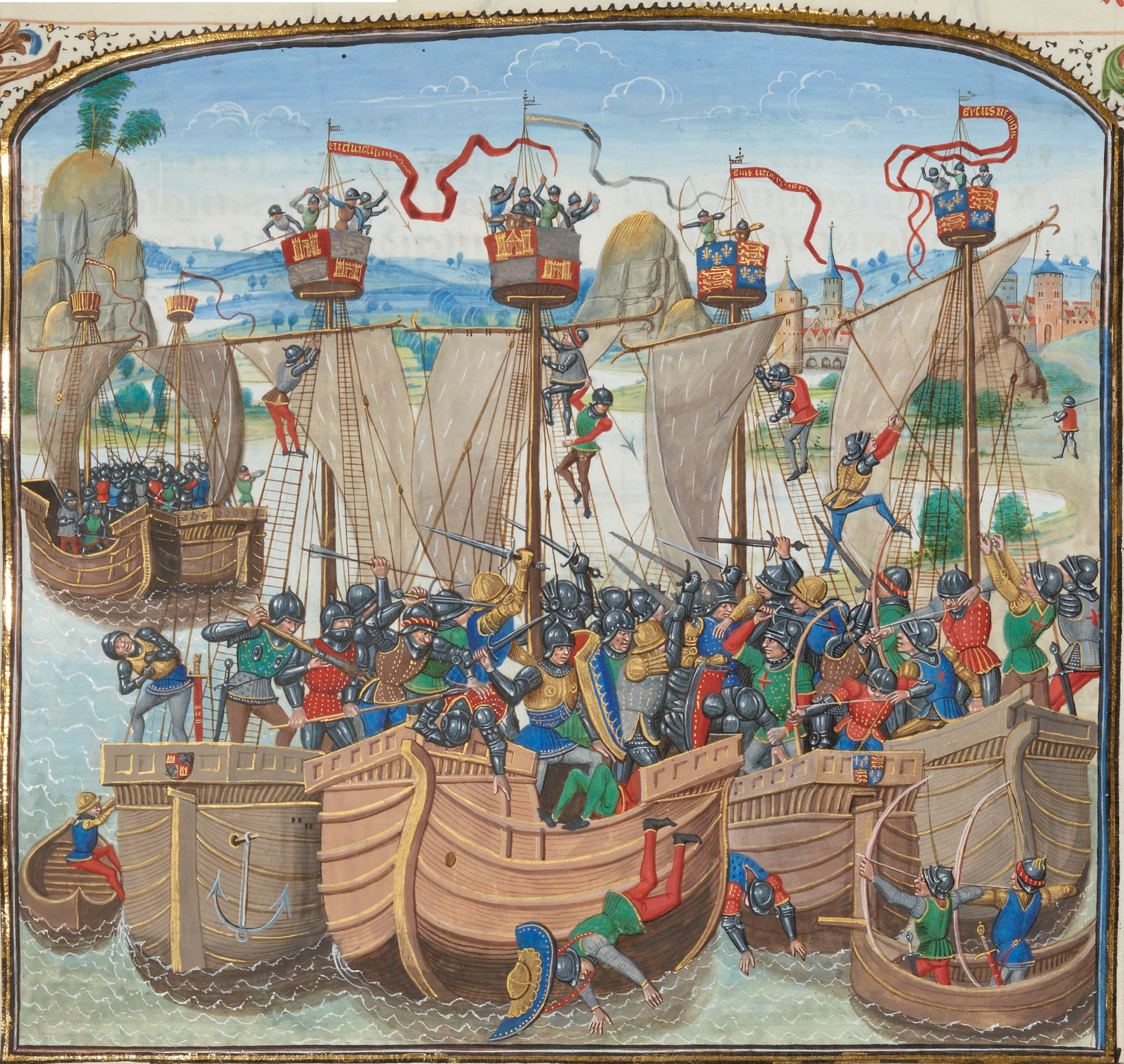
Battle of La Rochelle. Castilian army, formed by Cantabrians from the Brotherhood of the Four Cities, defeated the English army, getting the control of the English Channel for the Crown of Castile.

From a central core formed by the Hermandad de las Cuatro Villas (Brotherhood of the Four Cities) (Santander, Laredo, Castro Urdiales and San Vicente de la Barquera), the Hermandad de las Marismas (Brotherhood of the Marshes) was created, thereby uniting all the important seaports to the East of Asturias. During the period of the Reconquista, the Four Cities actively participated in the re-settling of Andalusia, dispatching men and ships. The coastal port cities of Cádiz and El Puerto de Santa María were settled by families from the Cantabrian Sea ports. Ships from the Four Cities took part in the taking of Seville, destroying the ship bridge linking Triana and Sevilla, a victory that is represented by the Carrack and the Torre del Oro of Sevilla in the coat of arms of Santander, Coat of arms of Cantabria and Avilés (Asturias).

=== 16th to 18th centuries ===
In the 16th century, the name La Montaña (The Mountain) was widespread in popular usage and in literature, as a designation of the Ancient Cantabria, as opposed to Castile, which referred solely to the Central Plateau. This distinction has survived into modern times.

Brotherhood of the Four Cities, antecedent to the Cantabrian region and the main Castilian port at the time.

With the rise of the Catholic Monarchs, the Brethren of the Marshes disappeared, leaving the Coregiment of the Four Villas, which included the whole area of influence of the old Brethren of the Four Villas (almost all of Cantabria). During the ancien régime, the greatest jurisdictional lordships of Cantabria were mainly under the control of three of the Grandee families of Spain: that of Mendoza (Dukes of Infantado, Marquises of Santillana), of Manrique de Lara (Marquises of Aguilar de Campoo, Counts of Castañeda), and to a lesser extent that of Velasco (Dukes of Frías, Constables of Castile).

From the 16th century on, there was renewed interest in studying Cantabria and the Cantabri, particularly concerning the precise location of the territory that this people had occupied. It was not until the 18th century that the debate about the location and size of Ancient Cantabria was settled in a series of works which described the history of the region such as La Cantabria by the Augustinian father and historian Enrique Flórez de Setién. Concurrent with the resurgence of this interest in the Cantabrians and the clarification of the aforementioned polemic, many institutions, organizations and jurisdictions in the mountainous territory received the name of "Cantabrian" or "of Cantabria".

In 1727, the first attempt to unify what would later become the province of Cantabria occurred. Despite this, the high level of autonomy that the small entities of the fractured estate of Cantabria enjoyed, combined with a lack of resources, continued to be the main reason for Cantabria's weakness, aggravated by the progressive advance of the Bourbonic centralism and its administrative efficiency. The latter continually emphasised the impossibility of the smaller territories facing a multitude of problems on their own: from communications to the exercise of justice, from putting aside adequate reserves for hard times to the indiscriminate levees for soldiers, and above all the progression of fiscal impositions. All of this led to an acceleration of contact between villas, valleys and jurisdictions, which tended to focus on the Assemblies of the provinces of the Nine Valleys, led by the deputies elected by the traditional entities of self-government.

There were two events that triggered the culmination of the integration process in this second attempt:

- On the one hand, the collective interest in avoiding making contributions to the reconstruction of the bridge of Miranda de Ebro, imposed by order of the Intendant of Burgos on 11 July 1775, the same year that Cantabria suffered two tremendous floods, on 20 June and on 3 November. There was a need to face as the banditry that operated with impunity in Cantabria as a result of a lack of local juridical resources. After the General Deputy of Nine Valleys gathered the affected jurisdictions to the assembly that was to take place in Puente San Miguel on 21 March 1777, they sent their respective deputies with sufficient authority to join with the Nine Valleys.

In this General Assembly a framework was established and formal steps began to be taken, leading to administrative and legal unity in 1778. This all culminated in the success of the Assembly held in the Assembly House of Puente San Miguel on 28 July 1778, where the province of Cantabria was constituted. It was achieved by passing the common ordinances which had been developed to that end, and which had been discussed and approved previously in councils of all the villas, valleys and subscribed jurisdictions. They were, in addition to the Nine Valleys: Rivadedeva, Peñamellera, the province of Liébana, Peñarrubia, Lamasón, Rionansa, the Villa of San Vicente de la Barquera, Coto de Estrada, Valdáliga, the Villa of Santillana del Mar, Lugar de Viérnoles, the Villa of Cartes and environs, the Valley of Buelna, the Valley of Cieza, the Valley of Iguña with the Villas of San Vicente and Los Llares, the Villa of Pujayo, the Villa of Pie de Concha y Bárcena, the Valley of Anievas, and the Valley of Toranzo.

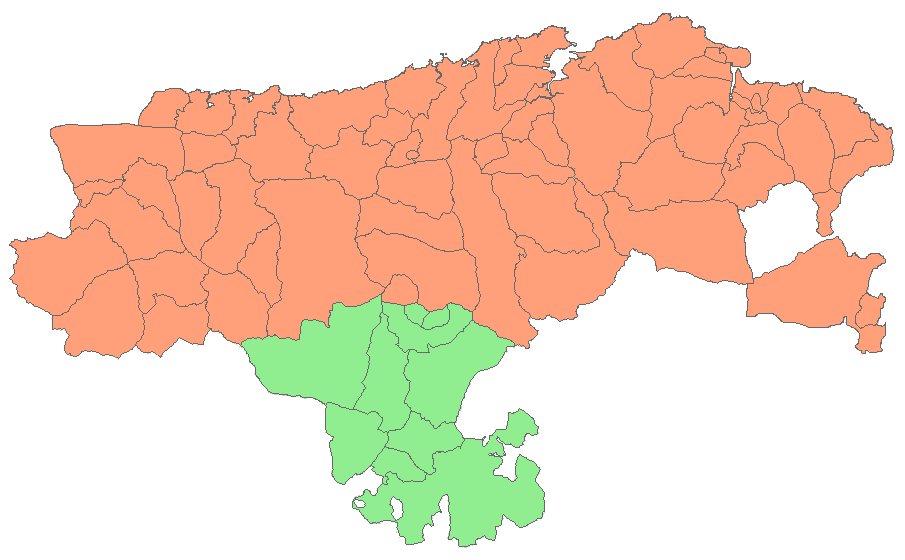
Party and Baton of Laredo (Province of Cantabria) Merindad of Campoo (Province of Toro).

Having learned lessons from the failed attempt of 1727, the first objective of the new entity was to obtain approval from King Charles III for the union of all the Cantabrian jurisdictions into one province. The royal ratification was granted on 22 November 1779.

The 28 jurisdictions that initially comprised the province of Cantabria were clear in their intention that all the other jurisdictions that formed the Party and Baton of the Four Villas of the Coast should be included in the new province. To this end they set out the steps needed for this to happen as soon as those jurisdictions should request it. They would have to abide by the ordinances, having the same rights and duties as the founders, all on an equal footing. Thus, the following joined in quick succession: the Abbey of Santillana, the Valleys of Tudanca, Polaciones, Herrerías, Castañeda, the Villa of Torrelavega and environs, Val de San Vicente, Valle de Carriedo, Tresviso, and the Pasiegan Villas of La Vega, San Roque and San Pedro, as well as the city of Santander with its abbey.

Competition between the townships of Laredo and Santander led to the latter, having initially allowed the name of Cantabria for the province created at the beginning of the 19th century, later retracting its consent and demanding that it bear the name of Santander, so there would be no doubt as to which was the capital. When in 1821 the Provincial Council presented before the constitutional Courts its definitive plan for the provincial borders and legal entities, it proposed the name of province of Cantabria, to which the Township of Santander replied that "this province must retain the name of Santander". However, many newspapers still showed in their headings the name of Cantabria, or Cantabrian.

=== 19th century ===
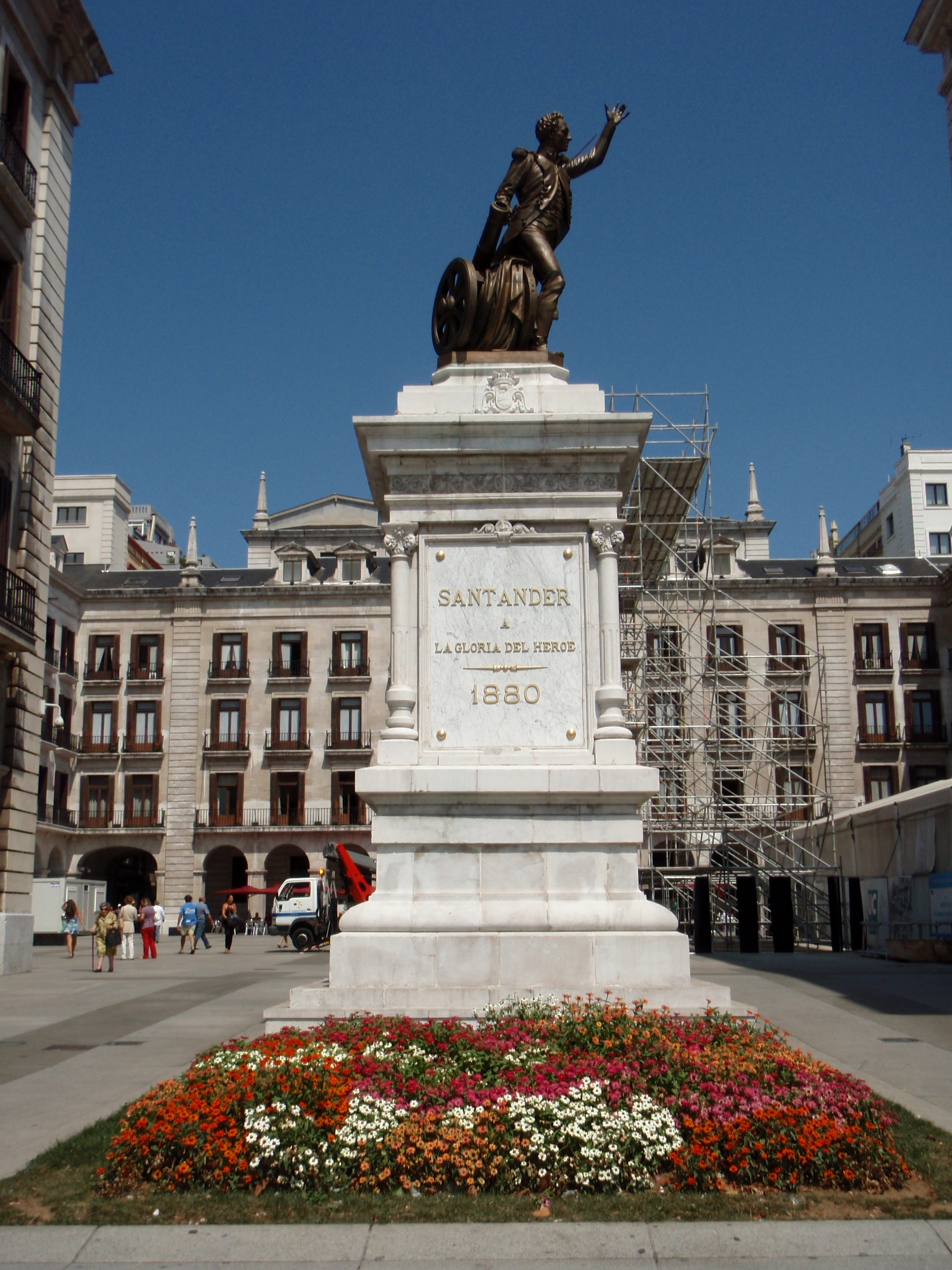
A statue in Santander erected in honor of Cantabrian artillery captain Pedro Velarde y Santillán, hero of the Spanish war of independence, who died 2 May 1808, during the uprising against the French occupation of Madrid.

During the War of Independence (1808–1814), Bishop Rafael Tomás Menéndez de Luarca, a strong defender of absolutism, promoted himself as the "Regent of Cantabria" and established the Cantabrian Armaments in Santander, a section of the army whose purpose was to travel to all the mountain passes from the Central Plateau to detain any French troop.

Although defeated, he managed later to regroup in Liébana under the command of General Juan Díaz Porlier, calling his forces the Cantabrian Division, in which there were various regiments and battalions, such as the Hussars of Cantabria (cavalry) or the Shooters of Cantabria (infantry). During the Carlist wars they formed a unit called the Cantabrian Brigade.

=== 20th century ===
The use of terms with ancestral resonance through the 18th and 19th centuries continued during the 20th century, taking on a political tone that was distinctly regionalist, until 1936. In fact, the Republican Federal Party produced an autonomy statute for a Cantabrian-Castilian Federal State that year, which would include present-day Cantabria and any neighbouring areas from Castile and Asturias willing to join it. It could not be passed because of the Civil War. Following the war and the subsequent marginalization of such efforts under the Francoists regime, the use of the name of Cantabria decreased, to the point that for official purposes it was relegated to sports associations, the only arena in which Cantabria was noted as a region.

In 1963, the president of the Provincial Council, Pedro Escalante y Huidobro, proposed reapplying the name of Cantabria to the Province of Santander, as suggested in an academic report written by the historian Tomás Maza Solano. Although further steps were taken and many of the townships were in favour of the move, the petition did not succeed, mostly due to the opposition of Santander City Council. On 30 December 1981, a process that had been started in April 1979 by the Council of Cabezón de la Sal, under the presidency of Ambrosio Calzada Hernández, culminated in the granting of self-rule to Cantabria, outlined in Article 143 of the Spanish Constitution. Cantabria based its claim to autonomy on the constitutional precept that made provision for self-government for "provinces with a historic regional character".

A Mixed Assembly formed out of provincial deputies and national members of parliament began the task of drawing up an Autonomy Statute on 10 September 1979. Following the approval of the General Courts on 15 December 1981, the King of Spain signed the corresponding Organic Law of Autonomy Statute for Cantabria on 30 December of the same year. Thus, the province of Santander broke its link to Castile, and left the former region of Castile and León to which it had belonged up to that time, together with the provinces of Ávila, Burgos, León, Logroño, Palencia, Salamanca, Segovia, Soria, Valladolid and Zamora.

On 20 February 1982, the first Regional Assembly (now Parliament) was formed, with provisional status. From this time, the former province of Santander has been known as Cantabria and has thereby regained its historic name. The first home-rule elections were held in May 1983. The 4th Legislature (1995–1999) brought into effect the first great reform of the Autonomy Statute of Cantabria, approved by all the parliamentary groups.

== Geography ==
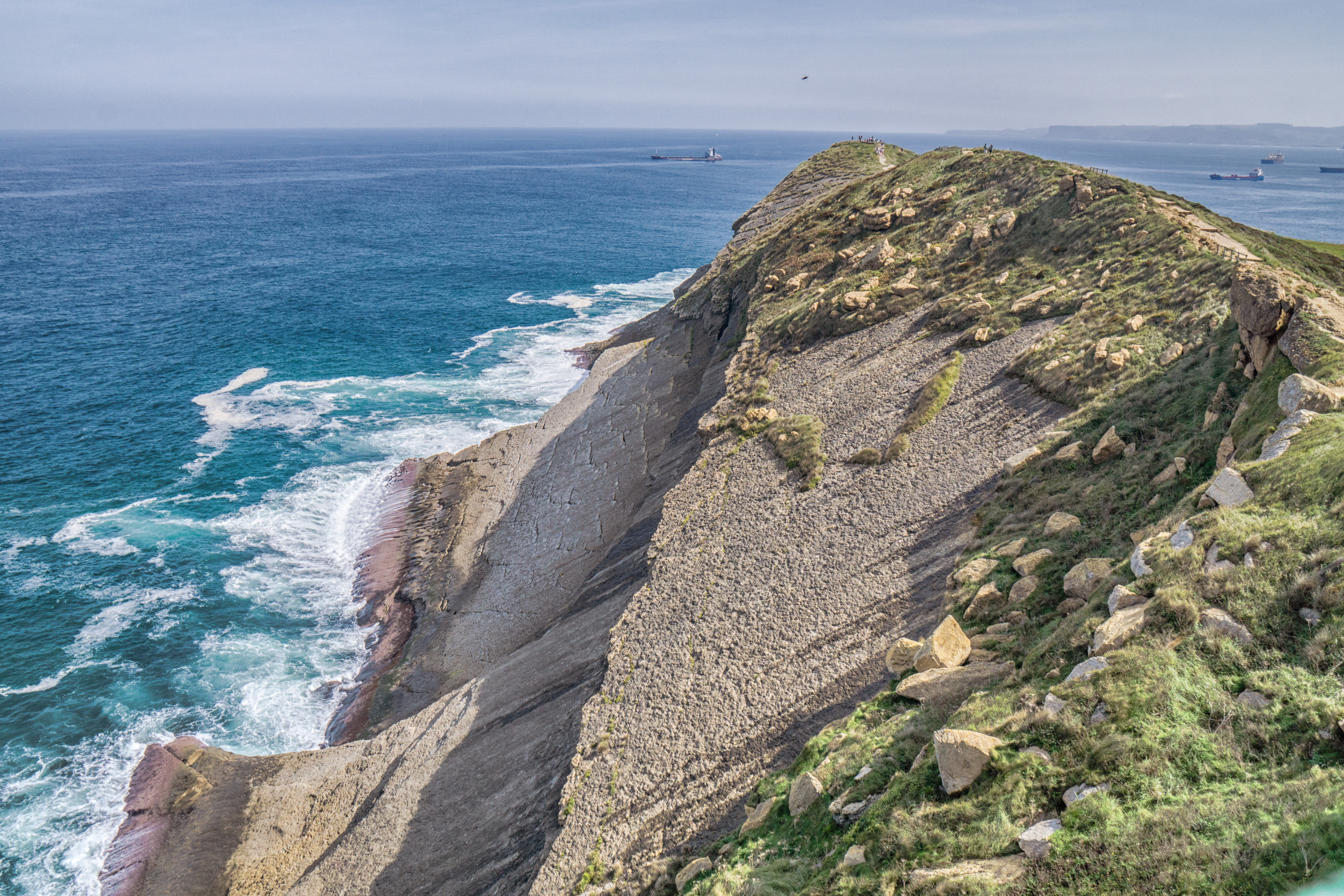
Cabo Mayor and entrance to the harbor, Santander

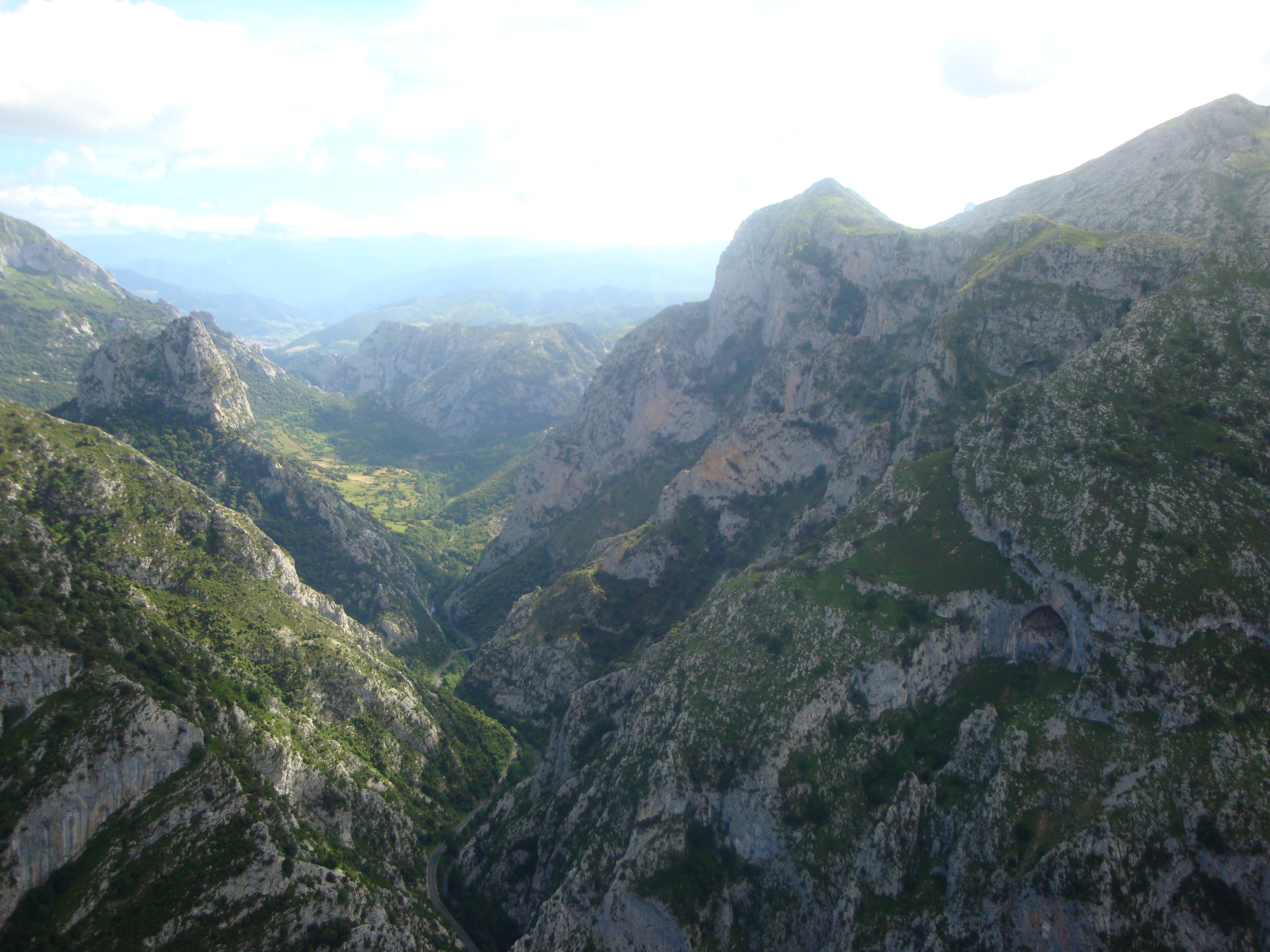
La Hermida

Cantabria is a mountainous and coastal region, with important natural resources. It has two distinct areas which are well differentiated morphologically:

- Coast. A coastal strip of low, wide and gently rolling valleys some 10 kilometres (6.2 mi) in width, the altitude of which does not rise above 500 metres (1,640 ft), and which meets the ocean in a line of abrupt cliffs broken by river estuaries, forming rias and beaches. Santander Bay is the most prominent indentation in the coastline. To the south, the coastal strip rises to meet the mountains.
- Mountains. This is a long barrier made up of abruptly rising mountains parallel to the sea, which are part of the Cantabrian Mountains. The mountains are mostly made of limestone with karst topography, and occupy most of Cantabria's area. They form deep valleys running north–south. The torrential rivers are short, fast flowing and of great eroding power, so the slopes are steep. The valleys define different natural regions, delimited physically by the intervening mountain ranges: Liébana, Saja-Nansa, Besaya, Pas-Pisueña, Miera, Asón-Agüera, Campoo. To the 'mountain' region belongs the Escudo Range, a mountain range of 600 to 1,000 metres (2,000 to 3,300 ft) high that covers 15 or 20 km (9 1/2 or 12 1/2 mi) in a parallel line to the coast in the West part of Cantabria.

Towards the south are higher mountains, the tops of which form the watershed between the drainage basins of the Rivers Ebro, Duero and the rivers that flow into the Bay of Biscay. These peaks generally exceed 1,500 metres (4,900 ft) from the Pass of San Glorio in the west to the Pass of Los Tornos in the eastern part: Peña Labra, Castro Valnera and the mountain passes of Sejos, El Escudo and La Sía. The great limestone masses of Picos de Europa also stand out in the southwest of the region: most of their summits exceed 2,500 metres (8,200 ft), and their topography is shaped by the former presence of glaciers.

=== Climate ===
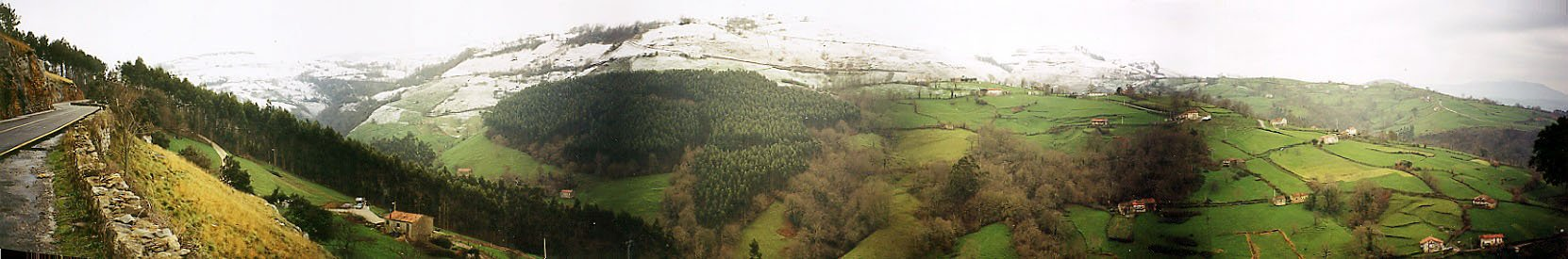
Panorama of the gateway to Alisas, in the municipio of Riotuerto, Cantabria

Due to the Gulf Stream, Cantabria, as well as the rest of "Green Spain", has a much more temperate climate than might be expected for its latitude. The region has a humid oceanic climate, with warm summers and mild winters. Annual precipitation is around 1,200 millimetres (47 in) at the coasts and higher in the mountains. The mean temperature is about 14 °C (57.2 °F). Snow is frequent in the higher zones of Cantabria between the months of October and March. Some zones of Picos de Europa, over 2,500 metres (8,200 ft) high, have an alpine climate with snow persisting year-round. The driest months are July and August. The mountainous relief of Cantabria has a dominant effect on local microclimate in Cantabria. It is the main cause of the peculiar meteorologic situations like the so-called "suradas" (Ábrego wind), due to the foehn effect: the southerly wind coming down from the mountains blows strongly and dry, increasing the temperature closer to the coast. This causes a decrease in air humidity and rainfall. These conditions are more frequent in autumn and winter, and the temperatures are commonly higher than 20 °C (68 °F). Fires are often helped by this type of wind: one example is the fire that destroyed part of the city of Santander in the winter of 1941. In these specific cases in the southern part of the mountain range the dry adiabatic gradient produces different conditions to the rest of the region: the wind there is fresher and more humid, and there is more rain.

=== Hydrology ===
The rivers of Cantabria are short and rapid, descending steeply because the sea is so close to their source in the Cantabrian Mountains. They flow perpendicular to the coastline, except for the Ebro. They also generally flow year round due to constant rainfall. Nevertheless, the rate of flow is modest (20 m^{3}/s annual average) compared to the other rivers of the Iberian Peninsula. The rapidness of their waters, caused by their steep descents, gives them great erosive power, creating the narrow V-shaped valleys characteristic of Green Spain. The environmental condition of the rivers is generally good, although increasing human activity due to rising population in the valleys continues to pose a challenge.

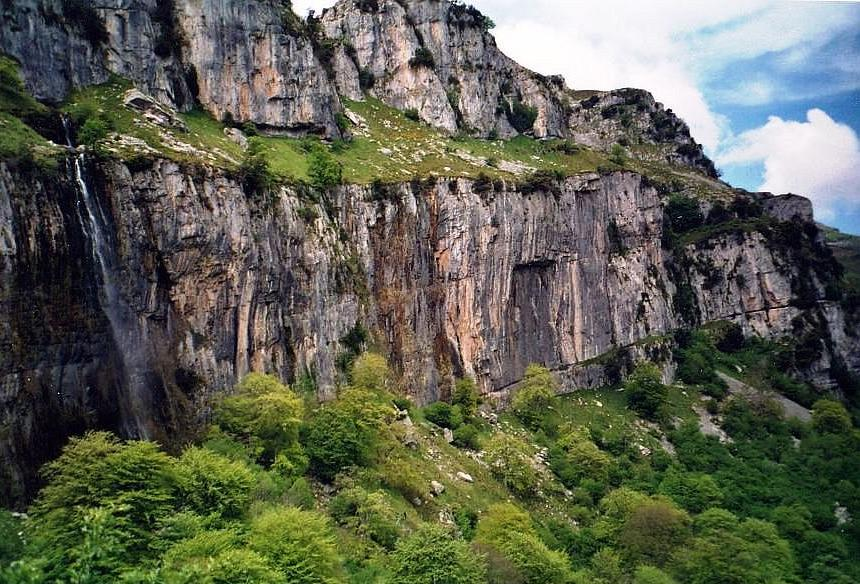
The source of the Asón River

The main rivers of the region, sorted by drainage basin, are:

- North Basin (flows into the Cantabrian Sea)
  - Agüera
  - Asón
  - Besaya
  - Deva
  - Miera
  - Nansa
  - Pas
  - Saja
- Ebro Basin (flows into the Mediterranean Sea)
  - Híjar
  - Ebro
- Duero Basin (flows into the Atlantic Ocean)

Cantabria is the only autonomous community whose rivers flow into every one of the seas which surround the Iberian Peninsula: the Cantabrian Sea, the Atlantic Ocean and the Mediterranean Sea.

=== Vegetation ===
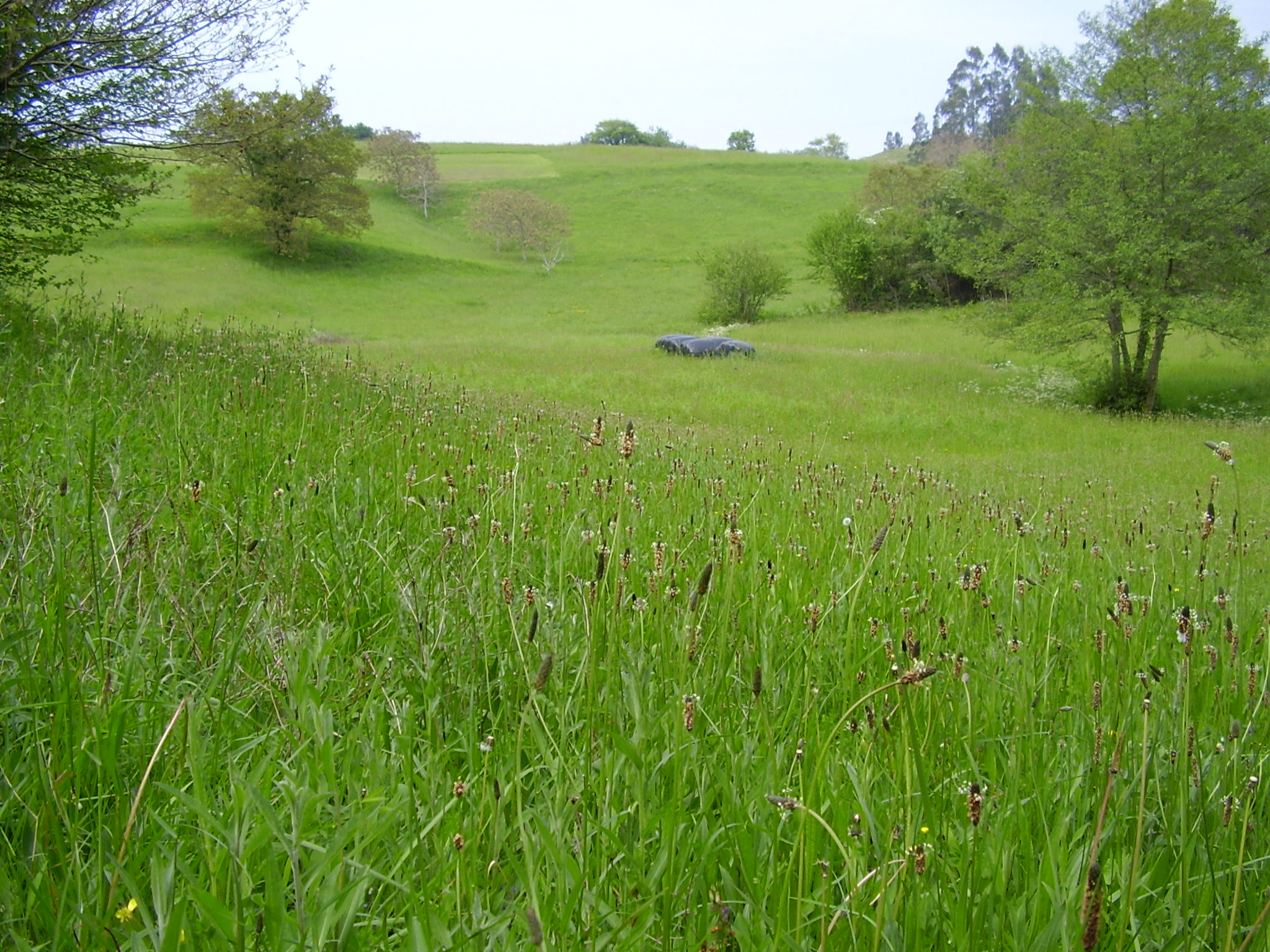
Grassland in Valdáliga

The variation in the altitude of the region, which in a short distance ranges from sea level to 2,600 meters in the mountains, leads to a great deal of diversity in vegetation and a large number of biomes. Cantabria has vegetation typical of the Atlantic side of the Iberian Peninsula. It is characterized by forests of leafy deciduous trees such as oak and European beech. Nevertheless, human intervention dating back to ancient times has favored the creation of pastures, allowing the existence of large areas of grassland and prairies suitable for grazing cattle. These grasslands are mingled with plantations of eucalyptus and native oak. The southern part of Cantabria, including the comarca of Campoo the fringes of the Castilian plateau, is characterized by the transition to drier vegetation. Another diversifying factor which contributes to local variation within the region is the Mediterranean ecotone, giving rise to species unique to the region, such as the holm oak and arbutus trees, which are found in poor limestone soils with little moisture.

In Cantabria there are several zones of plant life:

- The coastal strip, including sandy dunes with minimal vegetation. Adjacent to these are steep cliffs with plants unique to that type of terrain.

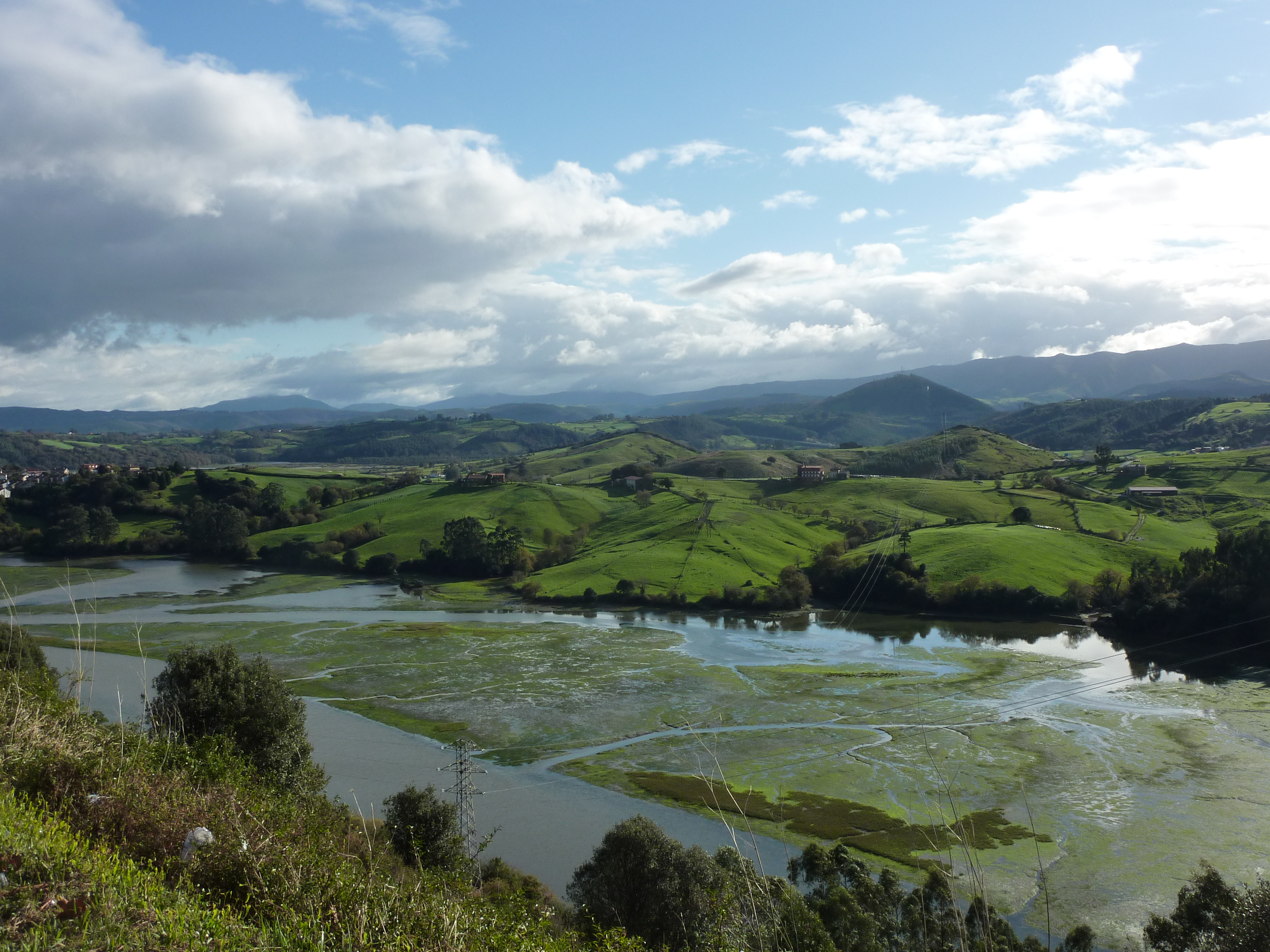
Hills and ria typical of a landscape from the maritime region

- The maritime region, near the coast and including altitudes up to 500 metres. Originally it had mixed deciduous forests containing ash, linden, bay laurel, hazel, maple, oak, poplar, birch, holm oak, and others. The riparian parts were filled with forests of alder and willow. Today these native forests have almost completely disappeared, leaving only reserves in area of poor arability. In their place there are grasslands which are quite productive in the temperate climate and which sustain the economy of rural Cantabria. Next to these are very large monoculture plantations of eucalyptus for paper production, of disastrous ecological consequences to the biodiversity and climate of the region.

During the last two decades of the 20th century, and due mainly to European agricultural policies (CAP), many farmers substituted forestry for livestock farming, so as to avoid unemployment and poverty. (Note: These events constitute the background of La vida que te espera, a film by Cantabrian-born director Manuel Gutiérrez Aragón.) This provoked a surge of eucalyptus – see eucalyptus article on Spanish Wikipedia – plantations (and to a less extent of pines) which often hid the illegal destruction of native forests, just as the spread of livestock farming had done in the past by the endemic conversion of forest into prairie. These acts have been laxly controlled by the local councils or the central governments, in a process that clearly follows the saying: "Pan para hoy, hambre para mañana" (which translates as 'Bread for today, hunger for tomorrow'; i.e., "short-term gain, long-term pain").

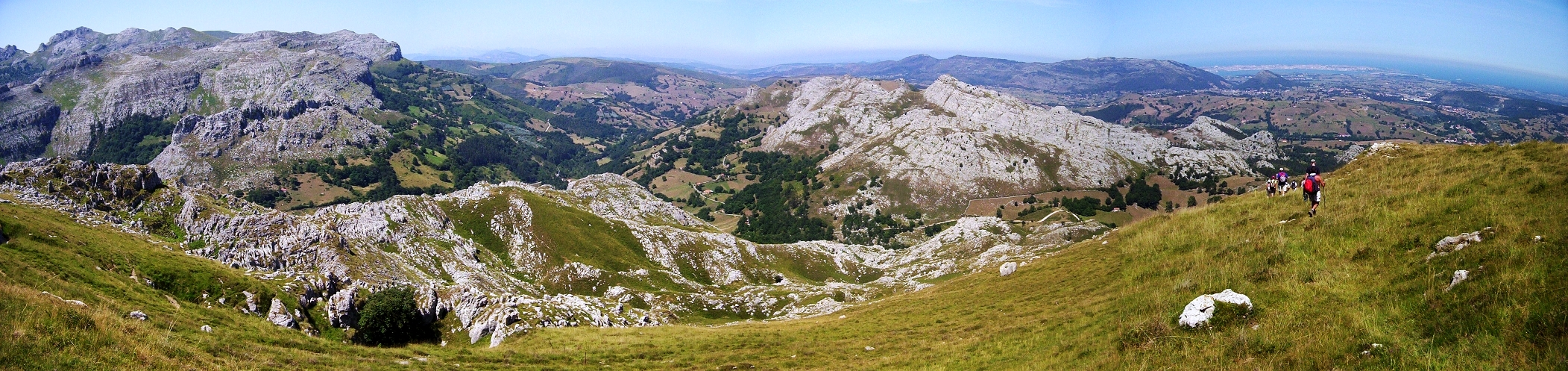
Panorama of the Cantabrian Mountains to the left and the port city of Santander in the distant right. The peak Alto de Brenas in Riotuerto has a height of 579 metres.

The plantation of pines has given way in the last decades to that of eucalyptus because this non-indigenous species has no natural attacker within the European ecosystem (while pines are highly vulnerable to the pine processionary). Both in relative and absolute terms the use of woods for forestry has increased in Cantabria, and is now almost 70% of all woods in the region.

- The foothills, from 500 to 1,100 metres altitude are colonized by monoculture forests of oak (Quercus robur and Quercus petraea) on the sunnier slopes. In more shaded areas and especially from about 800 metres there are forests of European beech which are the main food source in winter for many animal species.

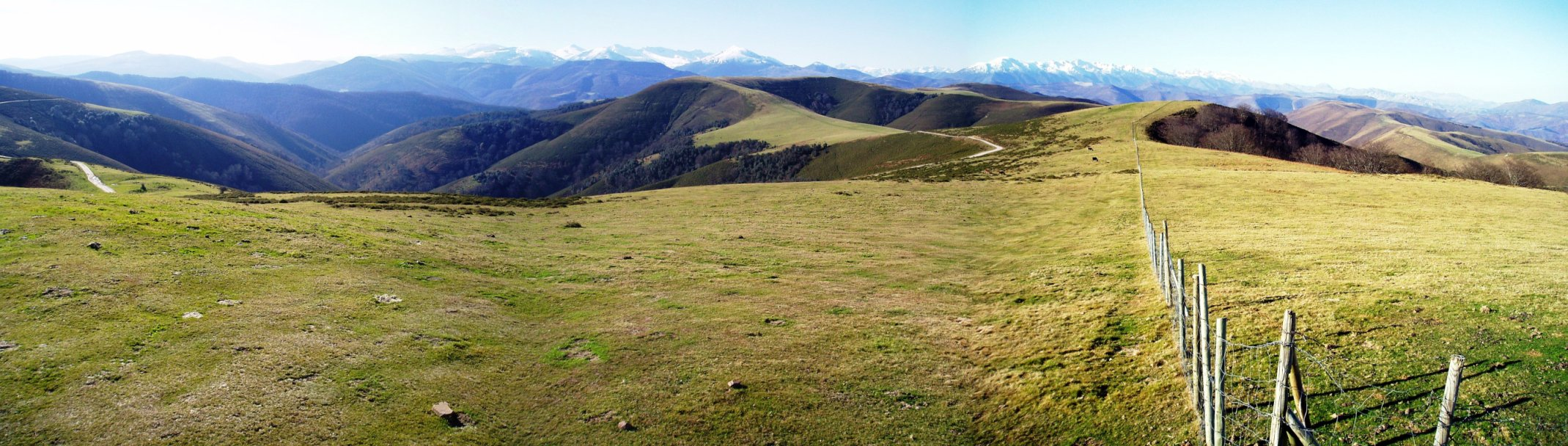
Brañas, or mountain prairies in the municipality of Arenas de Iguña. Tordías Peak is 968 metres high.

- The subalpine plane, in this high country, the plant life is composed of birch, scrub, and grasses which are especially important for the economy because during the summer they serve as pasture for grazing cattle and horses.

Along with these characteristics it would also be necessary to mention peculiarities of the comarca of Liébana, which has a microclimate very similar to the Mediterranean, allowing to grow cork oaks, vines and olives, and which is still very well conserved from human activity. The other remarkable comarca is Campoo, in southern Cantabria, with its Pyrenean oak.

=== Natural parks ===
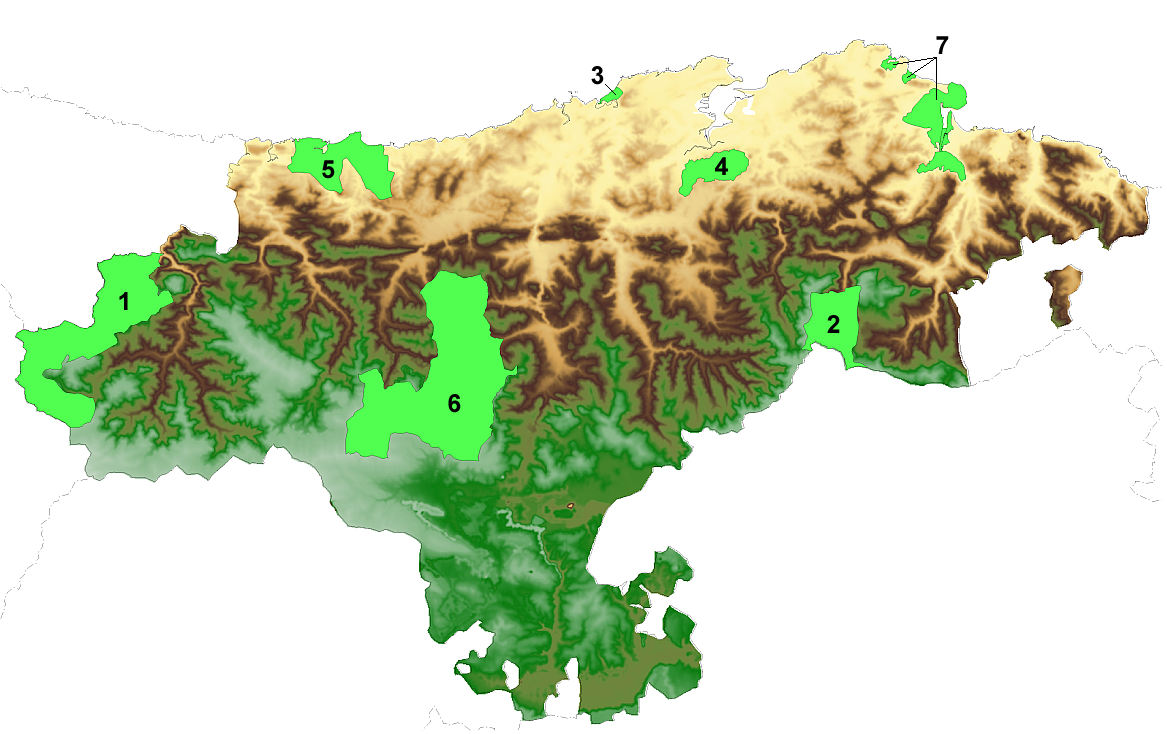
Natural and national parks in Cantabria: 1. Picos de Europa National Park 2. Collados del Asón Natural Park 3. Dunas de Liencres Natural Park 4. Macizo de Peña Cabarga Natural Park 5. Oyambre Natural Park 6. Saja-Besaya Natural Park 7. Santoña, Victoria and Joyel Marshes Natural Park

There are seven natural areas in this autonomous community designated as Natural or national parks:

- Picos de Europa National Park
- Collados del Asón Natural Park
- Santoña, Victoria and Joyel Marshes Natural Park
- Macizo de Peña Cabarga Natural Park
- Oyambre Natural Park
- Saja-Besaya Natural Park
- Dunes of Liencres Natural Park

The most important of these is the Picos de Europa National Park, which affects Castile and León and Asturias in addition to Cantabria, the three autonomous communities sharing its management. Santoña, Victoria and Joyel marshes are also Special Protection Areas for the birds (ZEPA).

Furthermore, nine Sites of Community Importance (LIC) have been declared: Western Mountain, Eastern Mountain, Western Rias and Oyambre Dunes, Dunes of Liencres and Estuary of the Pas, El Puntal Dunes and Estuary of the Miera, Ria de Ajo, Marshes of Noja-Santoña, Escudo de Cabuérniga Range and several caves with important bat colonies.

== Demographics ==
Historical population
Year	Pop.	±%
1842	166,730	—
1857	214,441	+28.6%
1877	241,555	+12.6%
1887	249,116	+3.1%
1900	279,091	+12.0%
1910	307,638	+10.2%
1920	342,954	+11.5%
1930	369,901	+7.9%
1940	402,810	+8.9%
1950	405,420	+0.6%
1960	432,146	+6.6%
1970	469,077	+8.5%
1981	513,115	+9.4%
1991	527,326	+2.8%
2001	535,131	+1.5%
2011	592,542	+10.7%
2021	584,708	−1.3%
Source: INE

As of 2025, the population is 593,623, of which 48.4% are males, and 51.6% are females. Minors make up 14.5% of the population, and seniors make up 24.5%.

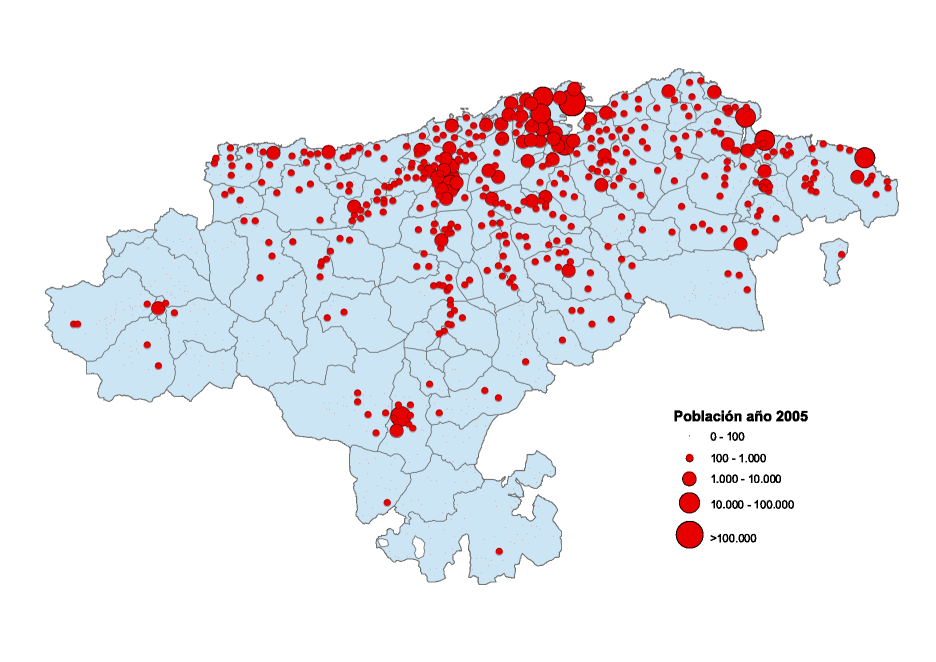
Demographic map showing centres of population in 2005

The majority of the population resides in the coastal area, particularly in two cities: Santander, with 183,000 people, and Torrelavega, the second largest urban and industrial centre in Cantabria, having a population of around 60,000. These two cities form a conurbation known as the Santander-Torrelavega metropolitan area. Castro Urdiales has an official population of 28,542, making it the fourth largest in the region because of its proximity to the Bilbao metropolitan area, there are a large number of people not registered in Castro Urdiales, and the true count may be double the official figure.

The most populated municipalities of Cantabria as of 2018 were the following:

Santander	172,044
Torrelavega	51,687
Castro-Urdiales	31,977
Camargo	30,263
Piélagos	25,223
El Astillero	18,108
Santa Cruz de Bezana	12,964
Laredo	11,148
Santoña	11,050
Los Corrales de Buelna	10,910
Reinosa	9,095

=== Immigration ===
In relative contrast to other regions of Spain, Cantabria has not experienced as much immigration. As of 2025, only 12.6% of the population are immigrants, compared to 19.3% nationwide. The largest foreign countries of birth are Colombia, Peru, Venezuela, Romania, and Moldova.

Foreign-born population (2025)
Country of birth	Population
Colombia	12,175
Peru	8,600
Venezuela	4,806
Romania	3,956
Moldova	3,258
Morocco	3,090
Argentina	2,813
Dominican Republic	2,717
Ecuador	2,606
Cuba	2,567
Brazil	2,417
France	2,110
Ukraine	1,954
Mexico	1,914
Paraguay	1,861

== Government ==
The Autonomy Statute of Cantabria of 30 December 1981, established that Cantabria has in its institutions the desire to respect fundamental rights and public freedom, at the same time as consolidating and stimulating regional development through democratic channels. This document gathers all competences of the Autonomous Community that were transferred from the Government of Spain. As in other Autonomous Communities, some competences were not transferred, for example, Justice. The Statute also defines the symbols that should represent the region: The flag, the coat of arms and the anthem of Cantabria.

The Parliament of Cantabria is the principal self-government institution of the Autonomous Community, being the representative body of the Cantabrians. Presently it is constituted by thirty-nine deputies elected by universal, equal, free, direct and secret suffrage. The primary functions of the Parliament are: to exercise the legislative power, to approve the budgets of the Autonomous Community, to motivate and control the actions of the government, and to develop the rest of the competences that the Spanish Constitution, the Autonomy Statute and the rest of the legal order bestow on it. The President of the Autonomous Community holds the highest representation of the Community and ordinary representation of the Country in Cantabria, and presides over the Government, coordinating its activities.

The Government of Cantabria is the body in charge of directing the political activities and exercising the executive and regulatory powers according to the Constitution, the Statute and the laws. The Government is made up of the President, the Vicepresident (in which the President can delegate his executive functions and representations) and the Councillors, who are appointed and ceased by the President.

After several legislatures presided by the Partido Popular or by Juan Hormaechea's UPCA, the Regional Government of Cantabria was directed by a coalition of the Regionalist Party of Cantabria and Spanish Socialist Workers' Party (PSOE) from year 2003 until 2011. The President was Miguel Ángel Revilla of Partido Regionalista de Cantabria (PRC), and the Vice President was Dolores Gorostiaga of the PSOE. As a result of the absolute majority of the Partido Popular in the regional elections of 2011, the president from 2011 to 2015 was Ignacio Diego Palacios, and the Vice President was also the healthcare Councillor, Maria José Sáenz de Buruaga. After the 2015 regional elections, Miguel Ángel Revilla of Partido Regionalista de Cantabria (PRC) was invested president for a third tenure with the support of PSOE.

=== Administrative divisions ===
Map of the municipalities and comarcas of Cantabria Asón and Agüera valleys. Besaya Valley. Campoo. Western coast of Cantabria. Eastern coast of Cantabria. Liébana. Saja and Nansa valleys. Bay of Santander. Trasmiera. Valles Pasiegos.

The autonomous community of Cantabria is structured in municipalities and comarcas (regions).

==== Comarcas (regions) ====
The Cantabrian legislation divides the autonomous community in administrative regions called comarcas, but traditionally, other subdivisions of the territory have been used.

- Administrative regions

Law 8/1999 of Comarcas of the Autonomous Community of Cantabria of 28 April 1999 establishes that the comarca is a necessary entity, integral in the territorial organization of the region. This law opens the development of the comarcalization in Cantabria promoting the creation of comarcal entities, which have barely begun to appear. The law establishes that the creation of comarcas will not become mandatory for the whole territory until at least the 70% of it had not been comarcalized by its own will. It also adds that Santander will not ruled by comarcalization and should establish its own metropolitan area instead.

Comarcas in Cantabria have not reached administrative nature and barely have definite borders. Only Liébana for its geographic position in Picos de Europa, Trasmiera and Campoo, in the Ebro basin are established are clearly defined comarcas in the region. Nevertheless, functional differences in the territory can be distinguished, dividing it in the following areas: Santander Bay, of industrial and urban nature; Besaya, also industrial; Saja-Nansa, eminently rural; Western Coast, which has urban character; Eastern Coast, vacational; the traditionally renowned Trasmiera; rural Pas-Miera; Asón-Agüera, also mainly rural; the very well defined Liébana, and Campoo-Los Valles, rural and industrial by regions.

- Natural regions (regarding geographical features)
  - Coastal strip
  - Central strip (Cantabrian valleys perpendicular to the coast): Liébana, Saja and Nansa, Besaya, Pas and Miera (or Valles Pasiegos), and Asón-Gándara valleys.
  - Southern strip (Rivers Ebro and Duero's basins): Campoo and Southern valleys
- Historic regions

Until the 13th century, Cantabria was organized in valleys, as was typical in all of northern Spain. From then on, it was substituted by the organization in cities, towns or historic comarcas that grouped several valleys.

==== Municipalities ====
There are 102 municipalities in Cantabria generally comprising several townships, and from these, several districts. A number of municipalities bear the name of one of their townships (be it its capital or not), but not all them do. Each municipality is governed by its own city or municipal council, and two of them, Tresviso and Pesquera, did it by concejo abierto (open council) until 2011, having fewer than 250 inhabitants.

The Mancomunidad Campoo-Cabuérniga is not a municipality, but a communal property, singular for its size and characteristics, of shared management between the municipalities of Hermandad de Campoo de Suso, Cabuérniga, Los Tojos and Ruente. This mountain estate is used as a grazing ground for Tudanca cattle and also for horses in less amount, in its brañas or grass prairies, and even nowadays transhumant cattle farming traditions survive in this region.

- Alfoz de Lloredo
- Ampuero
- Anievas
- Arenas de Iguña
- Argoños
- Arnuero
- Arredondo
- Bárcena de Cicero
- Bárcena de Pie de Concha
- Bareyo
- Cabezón de la Sal
- Cabezón de Liébana
- Cabuérniga
- Camaleño
- Camargo
- Campoo de Enmedio
- Campoo de Yuso
- Cartes
- Castañeda
- Castro-Urdiales
- Cieza
- Cillorigo de Liébana
- Colindres
- Comillas
- Corvera de Toranzo
- El Astillero
- Entrambasaguas
- Escalante
- Guriezo
- Hazas de Cesto
- Hermandad de Campoo de Suso
- Herrerías
- Lamasón
- Laredo
- Las Rozas de Valdearroyo
- Liendo
- Liérganes
- Limpias
- Los Corrales de Buelna
- Los Tojos
- Luena
- Marina de Cudeyo
- Mazcuerras
- Medio Cudeyo
- Meruelo
- Miengo
- Miera
- Molledo
- Noja
- Penagos
- Peñarrubia
- Pesaguero
- Pesquera
- Piélagos
- Polaciones
- Polanco
- Potes
- Puente Viesgo
- Ramales de la Victoria
- Rasines
- Reinosa
- Reocín
- Ribamontán al Mar
- Ribamontán al Monte
- Rionansa
- Riotuerto
- Ruente
- Ruesga
- Ruiloba
- San Felices de Buelna
- San Miguel de Aguayo
- San Pedro del Romeral
- San Roque de Riomiera
- San Vicente de la Barquera
- Santa Cruz de Bezana
- Santa María de Cayón
- Santander
- Santillana del Mar
- Santiurde de Reinosa
- Santiurde de Toranzo
- Santoña
- Saro
- Selaya
- Soba
- Solórzano
- Suances
- Torrelavega
- Tresviso
- Tudanca
- Udías
- Val de San Vicente
- Valdáliga
- Valdeolea
- Valdeprado del Río
- Valderredible
- Valle de Villaverde
- Vega de Liébana
- Vega de Pas
- Villacarriedo
- Villaescusa
- Villafufre
- Voto

== Culture ==
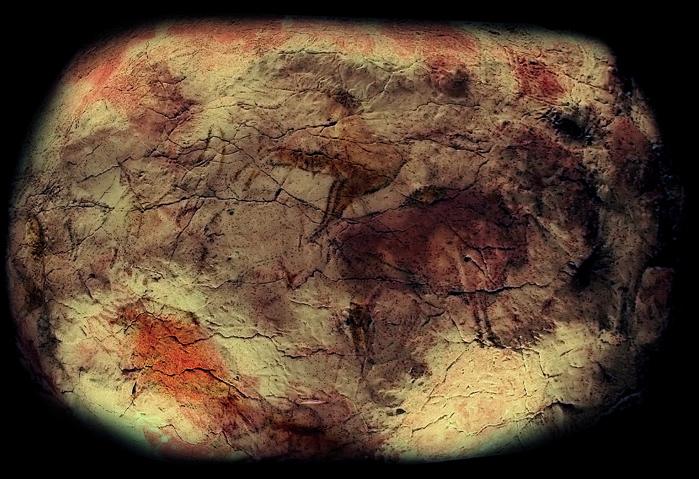
Altamira Cave paintings, made by Cro-Magnons.

=== Language ===
Spanish is the official language of Cantabria. The eastern part of Cantabria contributed to the origins of Medieval Spanish in a significant way. In western areas, there are remnants of the Cantabrian language, also called "montañés", and it is also somewhat preserved in parts of the Pas and Soba valleys in its eastern zone. Cantabrian can be viewed as a dialect of the wider Astur-Leonese language continuum, and is mutually intelligible with varieties in neighbouring Asturias.

=== Monuments and museums ===
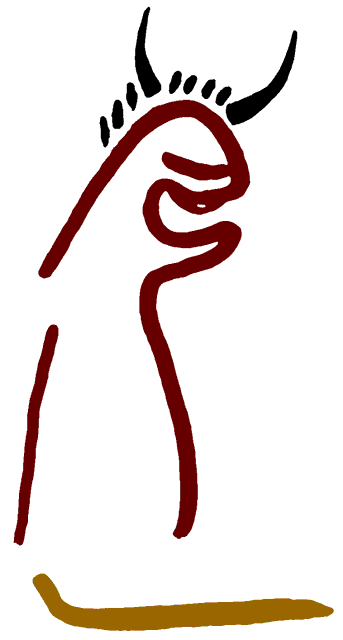
One of the many paleolithic paintings in the Cave of La Pasiega

- Caves: Altamira Cave, El Soplao, Del Valle, El Pendo, La Pasiega Cave, Las Monedas, El Castillo, Morín, and others.
- Civil architecture: Magdalena palace in Santander; Capricho de Gaudí, Pontifical University of Comillas and Palacio de Sobrellano in Comillas; Bárcena palace in Ampuero; Castle of Argüeso in Campoo; Hornillos palace in Las Fraguas del Besaya; etc.
- Religious architecture: Collegiate of Santillana del Mar, Collegiate of Santa Cruz de Castañeda, Santo Toribio de Liébana Monastery, Santa María de Lebeña, Santa María de Piasca, Santa María del Puerto, San Román del Moroso, Santa Catalina del Cintul, Santuario de Virgen de la Peña, ermita de San Cipriano, ermita de Monte Corona, etc.
- Museums: Cantabrian Sea Maritime Museum, Ethnographic Museum of Cantabria, Santander Museum of Fine Arts, Regional Museum of Prehistory and Arqueology of Cantabria, Cantabrian Museum of Nature, Altamira National Museum and Investigation Centre, and others.

=== Universities ===
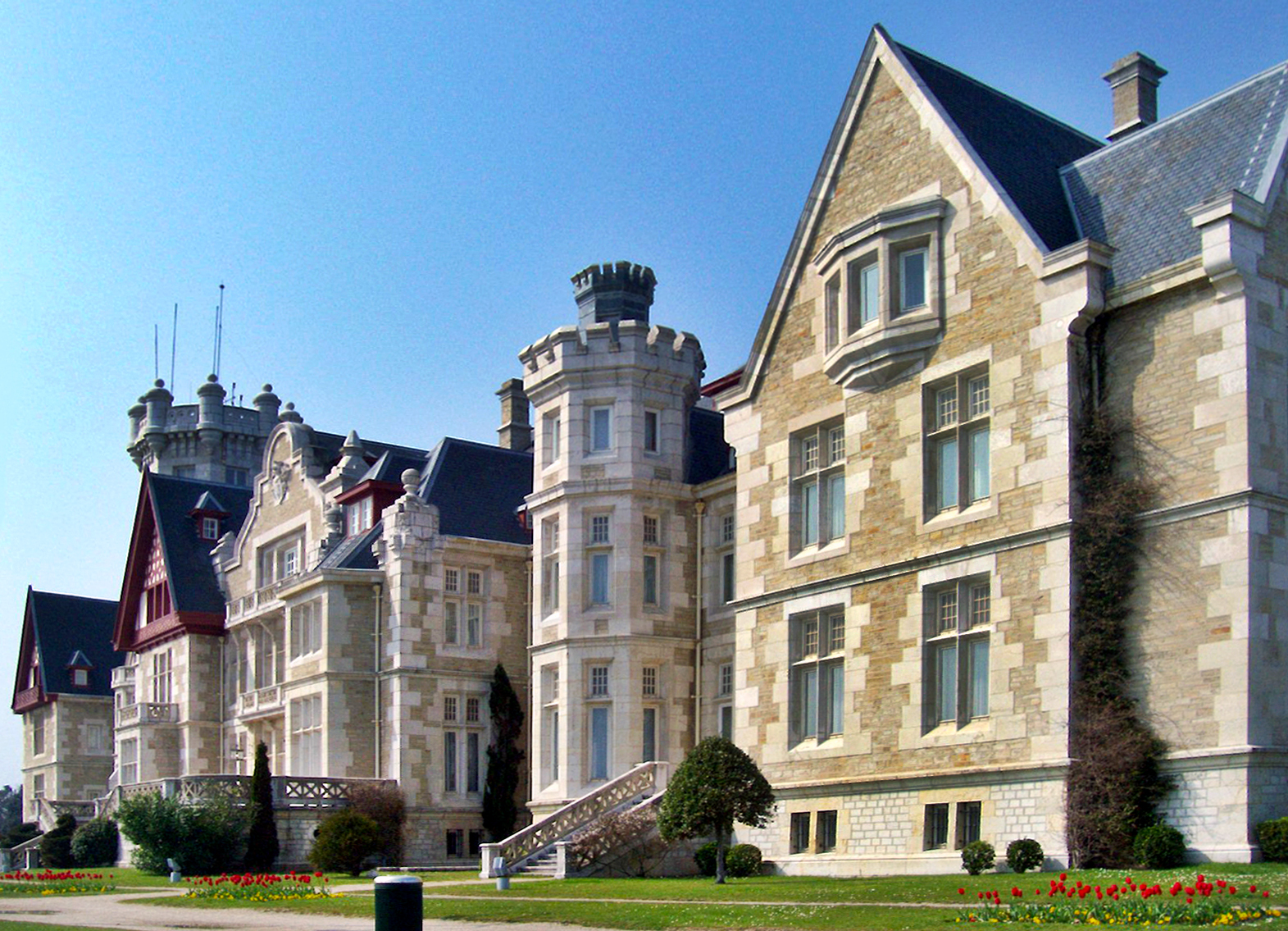
International University Menéndez Pelayo. Palacio de la Magdalena. Venue for the summer courses of the UIMP (Santander). It also was a seasonal residence for kings of Spain.

- University of Cantabria
- International University Menéndez Pelayo
- Universidad Nacional de Educación a Distancia
- Campus Comillas
- CESINE
- Universidad Europea del Atlántico

=== Fairs and festivals ===
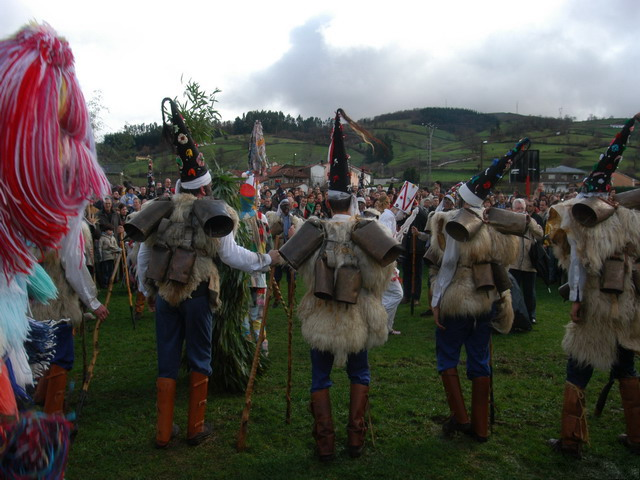
La Vijanera in Silió

Regarding the fairs, understood as big markets of products periodically celebrated, it is remarkable the Livestock Fair of Torrelavega taking place in the National Livestock Market "Jesús Collado Soto", the third biggest of Spain, that groups the buy and sell of all kinds of cattle in the region itself and the adjacent ones, being the bovine the main product. All over the region cattle and typical products fairs are celebrated weekly, monthly, or annually to gather the neighbours of the land. There are many different festivities in Cantabria, some of them limited just to small villages, but there are also festivals that attract tourism from all over the country. The most important are the following:

- La Vijanera (Winter Carnival), celebrated during the first Sunday of the year in Silió. It celebrates the end of the short winter days and the arrival of the sun. The representation of a white bear hunt takes place all over this little village. The traditional dressing of the characters in the play, the trapajones and the zarramacos, is one of its main features.
- Carnaval marinero (Sailor Carnival), in February in Santoña. Commonly known as "the carnivals of the North", in this carnival, started in 1934, many people of the town participate dressing themselves up as fish. The main event is the "Trial at the bottom of the ocean", where the "besugo" is judged before the last act, "The burning of the besugo". (A besugo is a foolish person besides a type of fish).
- La Folía, April in San Vicente de la Barquera, a parade of local fishing boats following one with a statue of the Virgin.
- Coso Blanco, first Friday in July in Castro Urdiales. Colorful parade with carts.
- Cantabria Day, second Sunday of August in Cabezón de la Sal. Traditional Cantabrian music, ceramics fair, local foods, bolo palma championships, ox dragging contests and public speeches.
- SAUGA folk music festival, celebrated the third weekend of August in Colindres.
- Floral Gala, August en Torrelavega. A festival of international touristic importance with carts decorated with flowers.
- Battle of Flowers, August, in Laredo. Carts decorated with flowers and fruit. Fireworks in the evening.
- Campoo Day, September in Reinosa. Tourist fair of regional importance since 1977 and celebrated since the 19th century, it shows customs and traditions of the Campurrians in their capital. Cattle shows, local products market and regional costumes are the items in this festival.

The following festivals are also remarkable in modern Cantabrian culture: Santander International Festival (Arts festival), Santander Summer Festival (Music festival), Sotocine (Film festival)

=== Mythology ===
The north of the Spanish state is a rich area for mythology. From Galicia to the Basque Country, passing by Asturias and Cantabria, there are rites and stories regarding and imaginary or impossible beings.

Cantabrian lore turns its forests and mountains into magical places where the myths, beliefs and legends have been present as an essential part of the Cantabrian culture, either because they have been living in the popular heritage through the oral tradition transmitted from father to son, or because they have been recovered by scholars (Manuel Llano and others) who have worried about preserving the cultural heritage. Its mythology and superstitions present a great Celtic influence that has diluted with the pass of time, being romanized or Christianized in many cases.

Cantabrian mythology features beings of giant proportions and Cyclopean features (the ojáncanos), fantastical animals (culebres, caballucos del diablu (lit. horses of the devil, damselflies), ramidrejus, etc.), færies (anjanas, ijanas of Aras), duendes (nuberos, ventolines, trentis, trasgus, trastolillos, musgosu, tentiruju), and anthropomorphic characters (the sirenuca (little mermaid), the fish-man, the cuegle, the wife-bear of Andara, the guajona).

=== Cuisine ===
- Typical dishes: Cocido montañés (Highlander stew) made with beans and collard greens; cocido lebaniego (Liébanan stew) made from chickpeas and marmita).
- Meat dishes: Beef, ox, deer, roe deer or boar. Cooked on the grill, stewed or with vegetables.

The livestock farming reputation of the region and its climatological conditions favouring cattle breeding allowed the European Union to pass the "Meats of Cantabria" denomination as a Protected Geographic Denomination for the beef of certain kinds of native races (Tudanca, Monchina) and others adapted to the environment or integrated by assimilation (Brown Alpine).

- Fish and seafood: Anchovies, angler, hake, sea bass, sole, mackerel, sardine, European anchovies, bonito of the North (of Spain), gilt-head bream, sea bream, red mullet, and scorpionfish, as well as some river fish such as trout and salmon. Rabas (fried calamari) and cachón en su tinta (cuttlefish cooked in its own ink) are local specialties. Clam, mussel, muergos (jackknife), cockle, velvet crab, spider crab, goose barnacle, periwinkle, Norway lobster and European lobster are available.
- Desserts: Quesadas and sobaos of the Pas valley; Unquera's Corbatas and Torrelavega's polkas (both basically puff pastry); Palucos de Cabezón de la Sal; and Pantortillas of Reinosa.
- Cheeses: Quesucos de Liébana.
- Drinks: Chacolí; apple cider and orujo (liquor made from pomace) from Liébana; and tostadillo from Potes.

== Economy ==
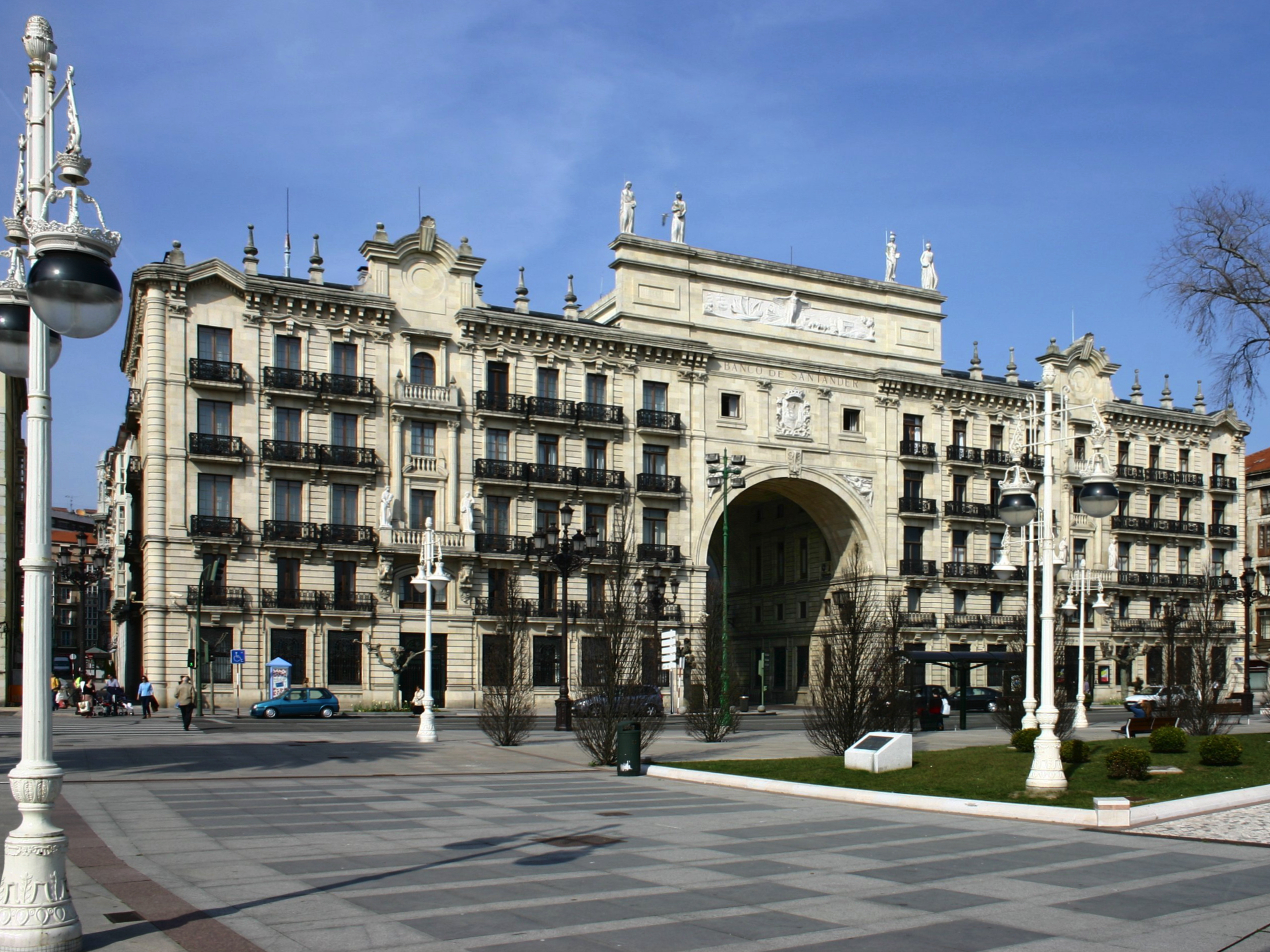
Banco Santander headquarters, in Paseo de Pereda, Santander

The economy of Cantabria has a primary sector, now in decline, employing 5.8% of the active population in the industries of cattle farming, traditional dairy farming, and meat production; agriculture, especially corn, potatoes, vegetables, and roughage; maritime fishing; and the mining of zinc and quarries.

The secondary sector which employs 30.3% of the active population is the sector with the most productivity in recent years due to construction; that of ironworking (Reinosa being the most important city), food service (milk, meat, vegetables and seafood), chemistry (Solvay, Sniace), paper production (Sinace, Papelera del Besaya), textile fabrication (Textil Santanderina in Cabezón de la Sal), pharmacy (Moehs in Requejada), industrial groups and transport, etc. The service sector employs 63.8% of the active population and is increasing, given that large concentrations of the population live in the urban centers and the importance that tourism has acquired in the recent years. As of July 2014, the unemployment rate in Cantabria is 19.3%, compared to 24.47% in Spain; while as of April 2010 its purchasing power parity was €25,326, compared to €26,100 in Spain and €25,100 in the EU25. In 2007, Cantabria's growth of real GDP was 4.1%, compared to a 3.9% average for Spain. The Gross domestic product (GDP) of the region was 13.8 billion € in 2018. GDP per capita adjusted for purchasing power was €25,500 or 84% of the EU27 average in the same year.

== Transport ==
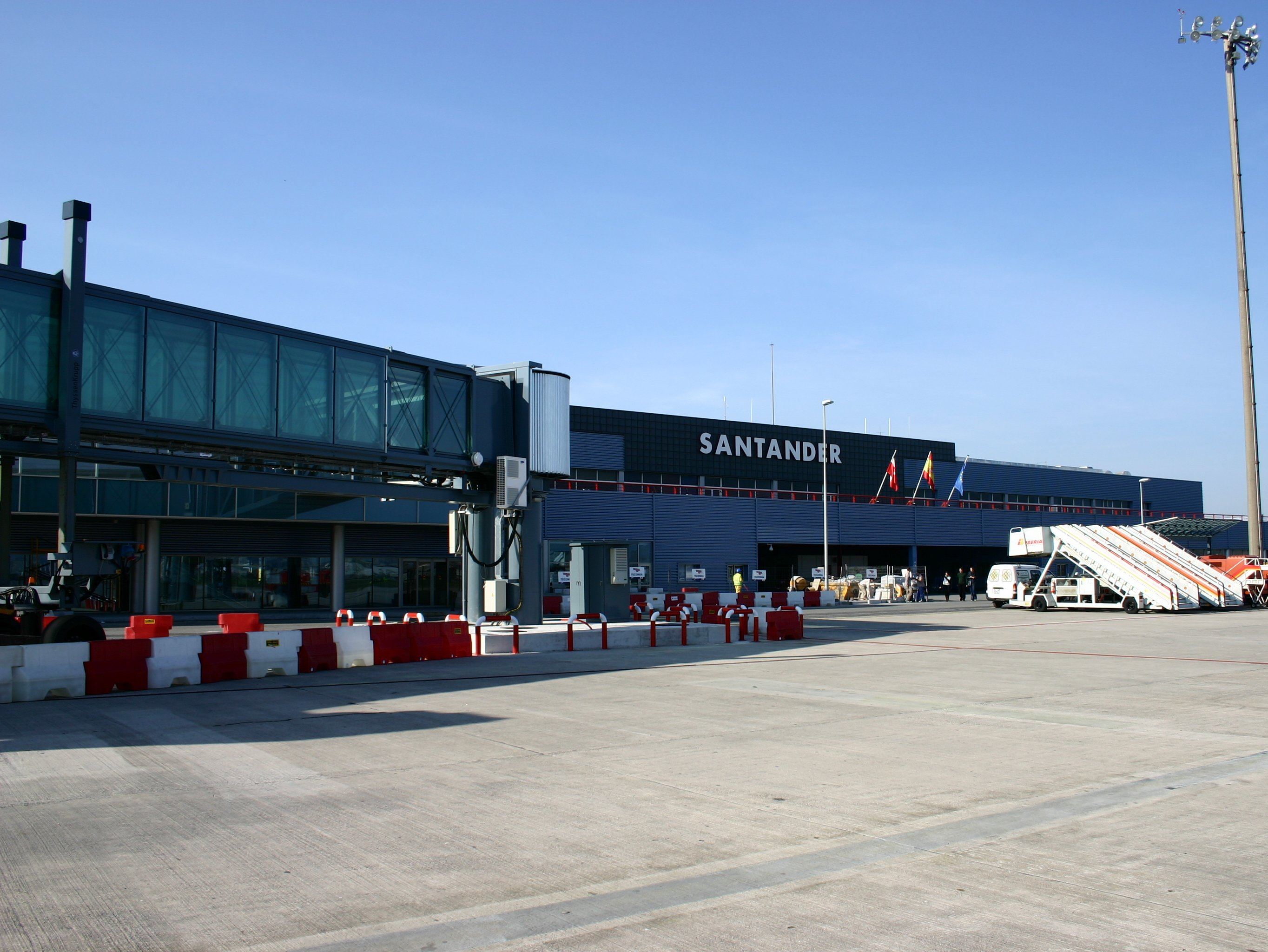
Parayas airport, located in the municipality of Camargo, 5 km from Santander

The most significant consequence of the strong relief of the Cantabrian territory is the existence of topographic barriers that condition decisively the courses of the linking infrastructures, as much in the north–south orientation in the accesses to the Castilian Mesa, as in the east–west in the communication between valleys. Moreover, the cost of their construction and maintenance is much higher than average.

The main transport infrastructures of the region are:

- Santander Airport
- Cantabrian Motorway (Autovía A-8, European route E-70)
- Cantabria-Meseta Motorway (Autovía A-67)
- Santander-Oviedo railway (Renfe)
- Santander-Bilbao railway (Renfe)
- Santander-Palencia-Valladolid-Ávila-Madrid railway (Renfe)
- Santander-Torrelavega-Valladolid-Segovia-Madrid high-speed railway (Renfe)
- Ferry line Santander-Plymouth

== Media ==
In Cantabria, there are two daily regional newspapers in addition to the national ones: El Diario Montañés and Alerta, as well as many weekly, fortnightly and monthly publications. The main national radio stations have transmitter stations in places like Santander, Torrelavega, Castro-Urdiales, or Reinosa. There are also numerous local and regional stations. For the moment, there is no Cantabrian autonomic television with public financing, although some local channels exist (including Canal 8 DM, TeleBahía, Telecabarga, Localia TV Cantabria, etc.). In recent years, the Internet has allowed new informative proposals to emerge in the shape of digital diaries or blogs, which contribute to enrich the mediatic panorama of the region.

== Sports ==
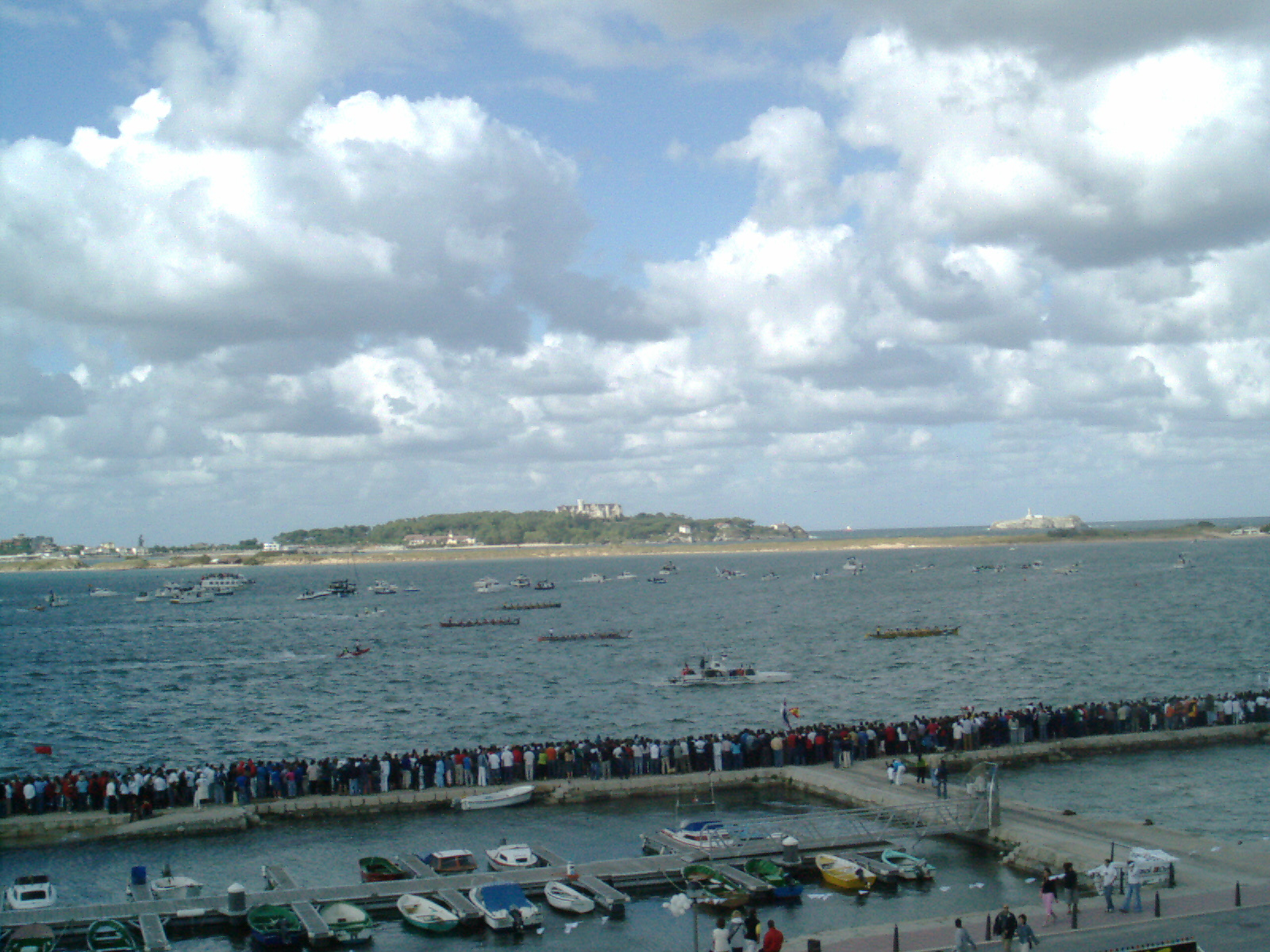
Trainera regatta at the Santander bay

The traditional sport of Cantabria is the game of bolos (skittles) in its four forms: bolo palma, pasabolo tablón, pasabolo losa and bolo pasiego. The first one is the most widespread, exceeding regional nature and reaching the eastern zone of Asturias and also being the most complex in its game rules. The existence of boleras or skittle rings is important in every Cantabrian township, often being near the church or the village pub. Since the late 1980s, skittle play has consolidated with the reinforcement of skittle schools, revamped by different town councils and Cantabrian institutions, various competitions, and media coverage.

The remo (rowing) is a very traditional sport in the coastal towns. The origins of rowing in Cantabria go back many centuries, when several traineras (traditional fishing longboats) competed for the selling of the caught fish, which was reserved for the first ship to arrive to the fish market. At the end of the 19th century, work became sport and people started to celebrate regattas between Cantabrian townships. The sport clubs of Cantabria, especially the Astillero, Castro Urdiales, and the Pedreña belong to the most prize-winning teams of the history of this sport, and nowadays they are having one of the best moments after a decades-long period of trophy drought.

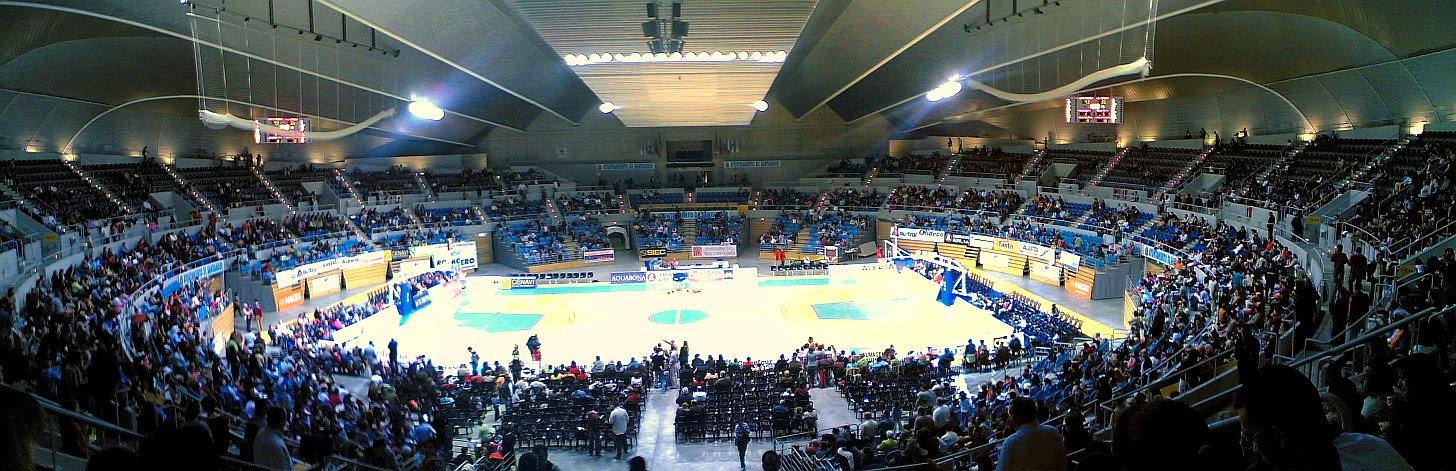
Santander Sports Palace: a basketball game featuring the local team, the Cantabria Lobos (wolves).

The Pasiegan jump is another of the outstanding rural sports of the region and a clear example of how the use of a work skill that disappears with the pass of time, gives rise to games and competition. Similar to other forms, like the Canarian shepherd jump, in the beginning this technique was used in the Pasiegan valleys to cross the stone walls, the fences, the creeks or the ravines that bordered the fields and obstructed the pass in the abrupt geography of the highland areas of Cantabria.

Referring to mass sports, Cantabria is present in national and international competitions through teams such as the Racing de Santander, the RS Gimnástica de Torrelavega and the Cantabria autonomous football team in football or the Independiente RC in rugby union. The Club Balonmano Cantabria that won Leagues and King's Cups as well as IHF Super Globe, EHF Champions League, EHF Cup Winners' Cup and EHF Cup in handball or the Cantabria Lobos that played in the ACB in basketball represented the highest level of the Cantabrian sport in the recent past.

== Notable people ==
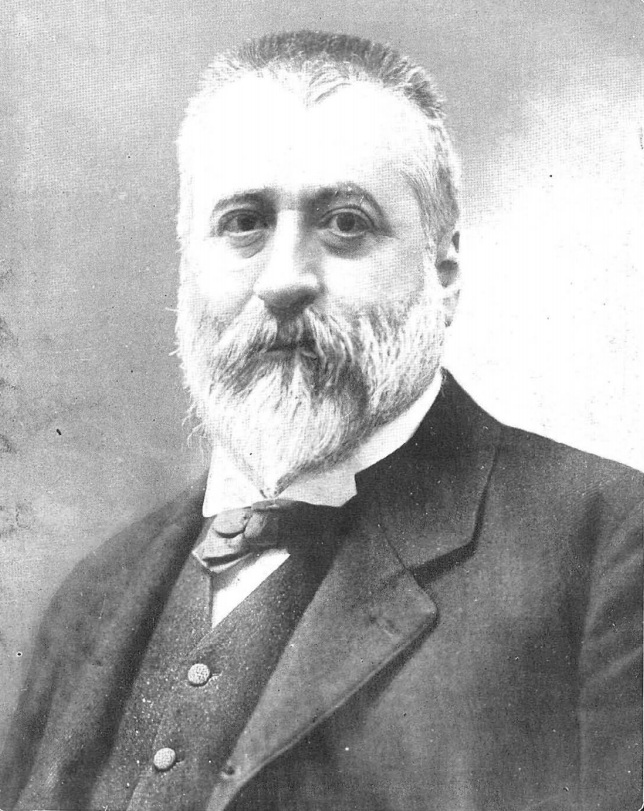
Marcelino Menéndez Pelayo

Cantabria has been the birthplace of exceptional and notable individuals in fields such as literature, arts, sciences, etc. Many of them have played a decisive role, not only in the history and events of the region, but also on the national and international levels. These include:

- Business: Jesús de Polanco, Emilio Botín, Ana Patricia Botin, Vicente Calderon
- Sports: Francisco Gento, "Santillana", José Manuel Abascal, Seve Ballesteros, Óscar Freire, Juan José Cobo, Cecilio Lastra, Francisco Ventoso, Ruth Beitia, Sergio Canales, Athenea del Castillo, Iván Helguera
- Music: Ataúlfo Argenta, David Bustamante, La Fuga
- Film, radio, and TV: Mario Camus, Manuel Gutiérrez Aragón, Eduardo Noriega, Antonio Resines, Nacho Vigalondo, Ricardo Palacios.
- Military: Corocotta, Pedro Velarde
- Religion: San Emeterio, San Celedonio, Beatus of Liébana
- Explorers: Juan de la Cosa, Vital Alsar, José de Bustamante y Guerra
- Literature: José María de Pereda, Concha Espina, Gerardo Diego, Álvaro Pombo, Luys Santa Marina.
- Painting: María Blanchard, José de Madrazo, Francisco González Gómez
- Science and technology: Leonardo Torres Quevedo, Juan de Herrera
- Politics: Luis Carrero Blanco, José Luis Zamanillo, Alfredo Pérez Rubalcaba, Joaquín Leguina, Miguel Ángel Revilla, Matilde de la Torre, Antonio Valverde y Cosío
- Sociology: Rosa Cobo Bedía

== See also ==
- List of mammals of Cantabria
- List of Amphibian and Reptile of Cantabria
- Architecture of Cantabria
- Caves in Cantabria
- Lábaru
- Duchy of Cantabria
- Nine Valleys lawsuit
- Hermandad de las Cuatro Villas
- La Marina (Cantabria)
- Castle of Pedraja
