= Polaciones =

- Municipality
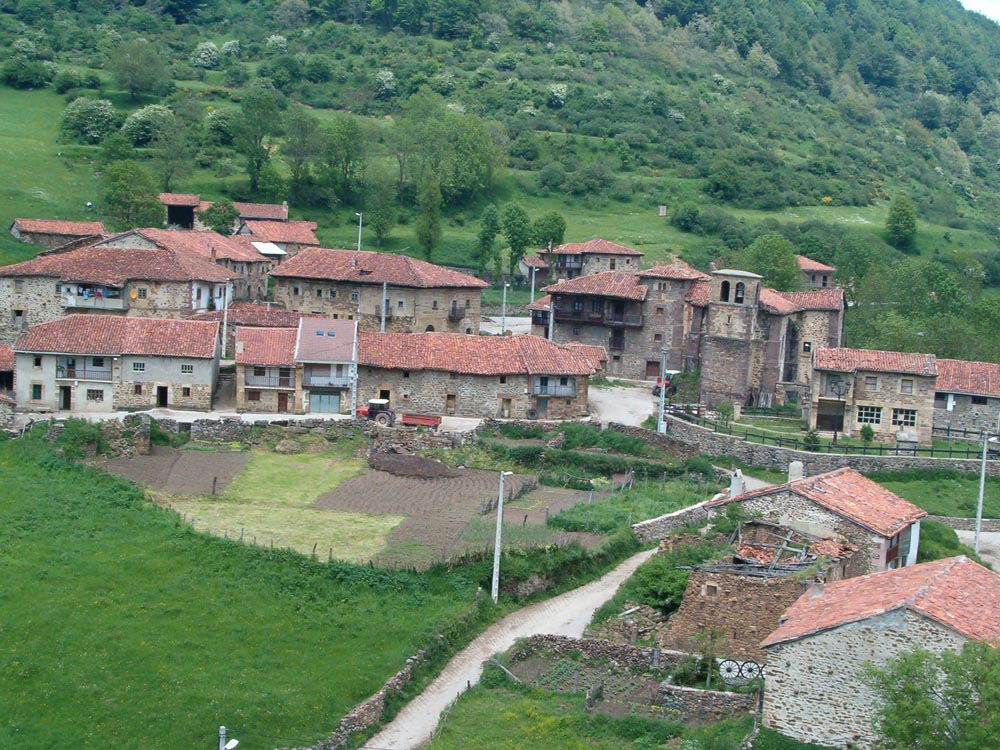
- Tresabuela, a village in Polaciones

- Coat of arms

- Location of Polaciones

- Location in Cantabria Location in Spain
- Coordinates: 43°6′7″N 4°24′47″W
- Country: Spain
- Autonomous community: Cantabria
- Province: Cantabria
- Comarca: Saja-Nansa
- Judicial district: San Vicente de la Barquera
- Capital: Lombraña

Government
  - Alcalde: Teodoro Ruiz Quevedo (PRC)

Area
  - Total: 89.77 km^{2} (34.66 sq mi)
- Elevation: 900 m (3,000 ft)

Population (2025-01-01)
  - Total: 209
  - Density: 2.33/km^{2} (6.03/sq mi)
- Time zone: UTC+1 (CET)
  - Summer (DST): UTC+2 (CEST)

Polaciones is a municipality located in the autonomous community of Cantabria, Spain.

== Geography ==
=== Localities ===
- Belmonte, pop. 20
- Callecedo (Callecéu), pop. 14
- Cotillos, pop. 6
- La Laguna (La Llaúna), pop. 12
- Lombraña (Capital), pop. 13
- Pejanda, pop. 15
- Puente Pumar (La Puente), pop. 48
- Salceda (Zarcea), pop. 16
- San Mamés, pop. 23
- Santa Eulalia (Santa Olalla), pop. 10
- Tresabuela, pop. 29
- Uznayo (Uznayu), pop. 43
