= List of municipalities in Cantabria =

Map of Spain with the province of Cantabria highlighted

Coat of arms of Cantabria.

Cantabria is one of the sixteen autonomous communities of Spain. It is divided into 102 municipalities, in accordance with the organizations of territories put forth in Article 137 of the 1978 Constitution of Spain:

The state is territorially organized in municipalities, in provinces, and in the autonomous communities that constitute them. All of these entities enjoy autonomy for management of their respective interests.

— Spanish Constitution of 1978, Title VIII, Article 137.

Municipal boundaries are defined in Spain's Ley Reguladora de las Bases del Régimen Local. These include "the basic local entity of the territorial organization of the state", with "legal status and full capability for the completion of their ends" and their elements are "the territory, the population, and the organization".

The administration and the governance of municipalities proceeds from a low level organ termed the local government or mayoralty, which is headed by a single person: an alcalde. Until 2011, the municipalities of Tresviso and Pesquera had been governed through a direct democratic system, but with the change in the law, both abandoned this system in order to adopt representative government forms that use a mayor-council system.

In general, municipalities are subdivided into various localities, one of which serves as the municipal seat and usually plays host to the town hall. Some municipalities take the name of one of their localities—be it their municipal seat or not—while others contain a name distinct from any of the localities therein. There also exist other sub-municipal government organs that enjoy some extent of autonomy in their management. These are called minor local entities, which correspond to villages, parishes, or districts, whose representation resides in a neighborhood board. Each of these entities has a municipal code composed of five or six numbers; the first two correspond to the provincial code, while the next three numbers refer to the municipality within the particular province. The sixth and final number is a check digit that is used in order to identify errors.

The Community of Campoo-Cabuérniga does not constitute a municipality, but is a sui generis territorial entity within Cantabria. Due to its unique size and makeup, the management of the locale is shared between the surrounding municipalities of Hermandad de Campoo de Suso, Cabuérniga, Los Tojos, and Ruente.

== Municipal elections ==
Results of the Municipal Elections of Cantabria
		1987	1991	1995	1999	2003	2007	2011	2015
PP ^{1}	Votes	106 583	57 901	107 823	123 429	133 907	139 555	152 423	116 049
PP ^{1}	Councilors	416	227	372	447	424	429	478	433
PSC-PSOE	Votes	95 171	103 873	89 772	99 135	102 973	92 425	70 882	64 498
PSC-PSOE	Councilors	290	349	282	267	256	245	196	190
PRC	Votes	28 227	18 966	33 221	49 898	66 592	73 783	70 634	71 952
PRC	Councilors	100	69	88	217	276	302	319	325
IU	Votes	12 609	13 789	23 302	11 674	13 714	5644	10 890	14 445
IU	Councilors	19	16	27	14	15	8	10	15
CDS	Votes	25 591	10 661	1126	1832	747	-	--	-
CDS	Councilors	69	30	0	2	0	-	--	-
UPCA	Votes	-	71 683	41 628	9179	-	-	--	-
UPCA	Councilors	-	285	170	29	-	-	--	-
UCn	Votes	-	-	-	-	8226	460	--	-
UCn	Councilors	-	-	-	-	15	1	--	-
TOTAL	votes	298 552	294 365	312 772	307 522	336 708	347 360	346 383	331 749
^{1} In 1987, the numbers reflect the votes for the People's Coalition (AP-PDP-UL).

Municipal elections are held the fourth Sunday of May every four years, coinciding with the date of the elections for the Parliament of Cantabria.

The electoral system is regulated by the Organic Law of the General Electoral Regime (LOREG) and is based upon voting on party lists and assigning councilors in line with the D'Hondt method. The electoral threshold for a party to gain representation is five percent of the valid votes cast.

The citizens of member countries of the European Union who maintain residency in Cantabria have the right to vote and run for office, in accordance with the laws that have been established in order to comply with EU Directive 94/80/CE.

The citizens of countries that have reciprocity agreements with Spain are able to vote in Cantabrian elections in the same manner as EU citizens. Countries with such agreements include: Argentina, Bolivia, Brasil, Burkina Faso, Cabo Verde, Chile, Colombia, South Korea, Ecuador, Iceland, New Zealand, Paraguay, Perú, Trinidad and Tobago, Uruguay, and Venezuela. Additionally, citizens of Spain who reside in some foreign countries, such as Norway, also are able to exercise their right to vote in Cantabrian elections, even though there is no reciprocity agreement between Norway and Spain.

The number of councilors a municipality elects depends on its population:

- Up to 100 inhabitants: 3 councilors.
- From 101 to 250: 5 councilors.
- From 251 to 1000: 7 councilors.
- From 1001 to 2000: 9 councilors.
- From 2001 to 5000: 11 councilors.
- From 5001 to 10,000: 13 councilors.
- From 10,001 to 20,000: 17 councilors.
- From 20,001 to 50,000: 21 councilors.
- From 50,001 to 100,000: 25 councilors.

== Map ==
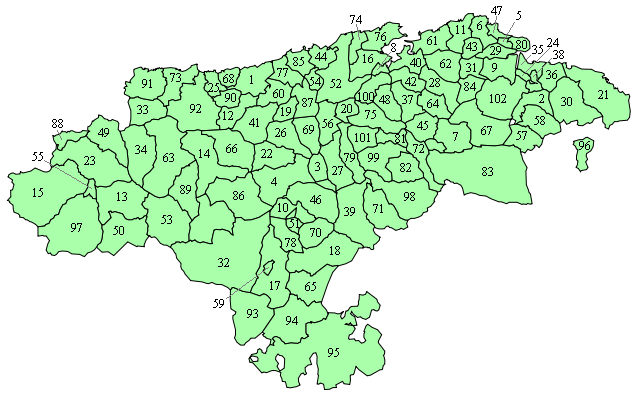

== List of municipalities ==
INE Code	Municipality	Population (2017)	Land area (km^{2})	Map	Coat of Arms	Flag	Sister cities
39001	Alfoz de Lloredo	2446	46.34				
39002	Ampuero	4222	32.34				Eauze
39003	Anievas	291	20.90				
39004	Arenas de Iguña	1690	86.82				
39005	Argoños	1713	5.51				
39006	Arnuero	2098	24.66				
39007	Arredondo	472	46.83				
39008	El Astillero	18,120	6.83				Chiclana de la Frontera
39009	Bárcena de Cicero	4132	36.63				
39010	Bárcena de Pie de Concha	687	30.53				
39011	Bareyo	1987	32.44				
39012	Cabezón de la Sal	8326	33.56				
39013	Cabezón de Liébana	595	81.43				
39014	Cabuérniga	1001	86.45				
39015	Camaleño	970	161.81				
39016	Camargo	30,556	36.58				Cugnaux
39017	Campoo de Enmedio	3757	91.06				
39018	Campoo de Yuso	682	89.72				
39019	Cartes	5742	19.01				
39020	Castañeda	2744	19.19				
39021	Castro-Urdiales	31,817	96.77				Aire-sur-l'Adour Bucraa Cabourg
39022	Cieza	536	44.07				
39023	Cillorigo de Liébana	1320	104.52				
39024	Colindres	8288	5.94				Le Haillan
39025	Comillas	2195	18.61				Arignano
39026	Los Corrales de Buelna	10,912	45.38				La Haie-Fouassière
39027	Corvera de Toranzo	2055	49.48				
39028	Entrambasaguas	3757	43.17				
39029	Escalante	749	19.11				
39030	Guriezo	2358	74.53				
39031	Hazas de Cesto	1550	21.89				
39032	Hermandad de Campoo de Suso	1612	222.65				
39033	Herrerías	623	40.34				
39034	Lamasón	302	71.23				
39035	Laredo	11,347	15.71				Cenon Laredo
39036	Liendo	1216	25.96				
39037	Liérganes	2355	36.73				
39038	Limpias	1824	10.07				
39039	Luena	611	90.54				
39040	Marina de Cudeyo	5147	28.37				
39041	Mazcuerras	2125	55.65				
39042	Medio Cudeyo	7459	26.78				
39043	Meruelo	1985	16.37				
39044	Miengo	4676	24.50				
39045	Miera	393	33.77				
39046	Molledo	1585	71.07				Molleo
39047	Noja	2553	9.20				
39048	Penagos	2083	31.67				
39049	Peñarrubia	332	54.28				
39050	Pesaguero	298	69.99				
39051	Pesquera	68	8.93				
39052	Piélagos	24,918	88.64				
39053	Polaciones	239	89.77				
39054	Polanco	5850	12.70				Bruges
39055	Potes	1342	7.64				
39056	Puente Viesgo	2843	36.14				
39057	Ramales de la Victoria	2895	32.97				Malestroit
39058	Rasines	966	42.89				
39059	Reinosa	9331	4.12				Deltebre Reynosa
39060	Reocín	8312	32.09				
39061	Ribamontán al Mar	4426	36.94				Bignoux
39062	Ribamontán al Monte	2223	42.17				
39063	Rionansa	1045	118.02				
39064	Riotuerto	1615	30.48				
39065	Las Rozas de Valdearroyo	264	57.35				
39066	Ruente	1031	65.86				Savignac-les-Églises
39067	Ruesga	870	87.96				
39068	Ruiloba	748	15.13				
39069	San Felices de Buelna	2421	36.24				
39070	San Miguel de Aguayo	154	35.99				
39071	San Pedro del Romeral	452	57.44				
39072	San Roque de Riomiera	380	35.70				
39073	San Vicente de la Barquera	4173	41.04				Pornichet
39074	Santa Cruz de Bezana	12,818	17.26				Martignas-sur-Jalle
39075	Santa María de Cayón	9095	48.23				
39076	Santander	171,951	34.76				San Luis Potosí
39077	Santillana del Mar	4154	28.46				Le Dorat
39078	Santiurde de Reinosa	254	30.98				
39079	Santiurde de Toranzo	1610	36.82				
39080	Santoña	11,004	11.53				Lons Palos de la Frontera El Puerto de Santa María
39081	Saro	515	17.82				
39082	Selaya	1915	39.29				
39083	Soba	1207	214.16				
39084	Solórzano	1040	25.50				
39085	Suances	8645	24.56				Bassens
39086	Los Tojos	402	89.50				
39087	Torrelavega	52,034	35.54				Zug La Habana Vieja Louga Rochefort-sur-Mer
39088	Tresviso	70	16.23				
39089	Tudanca	145	52.44				
39090	Udías	903	19.64				
39091	Val de San Vicente	2804	50.86				Mios
39092	Valdáliga	2218	97.76				
39093	Valdeolea	994	83.72				
39094	Valdeprado del Río	323	89.33				
39095	Valderredible	987	298.24				
39096	Valle de Villaverde	306	19.53				
39097	Vega de Liébana	765	133.21				
39098	Vega de Pas	784	87.53				
39099	Villacarriedo	1626	50.74				
39100	Villaescusa	3883	28.02				
39101	Villafufre	1014	30.08				
39102	Voto	2716	77.71				

== See also ==
- List of municipalities of Spain
