= Entrambasaguas =

- Municipality
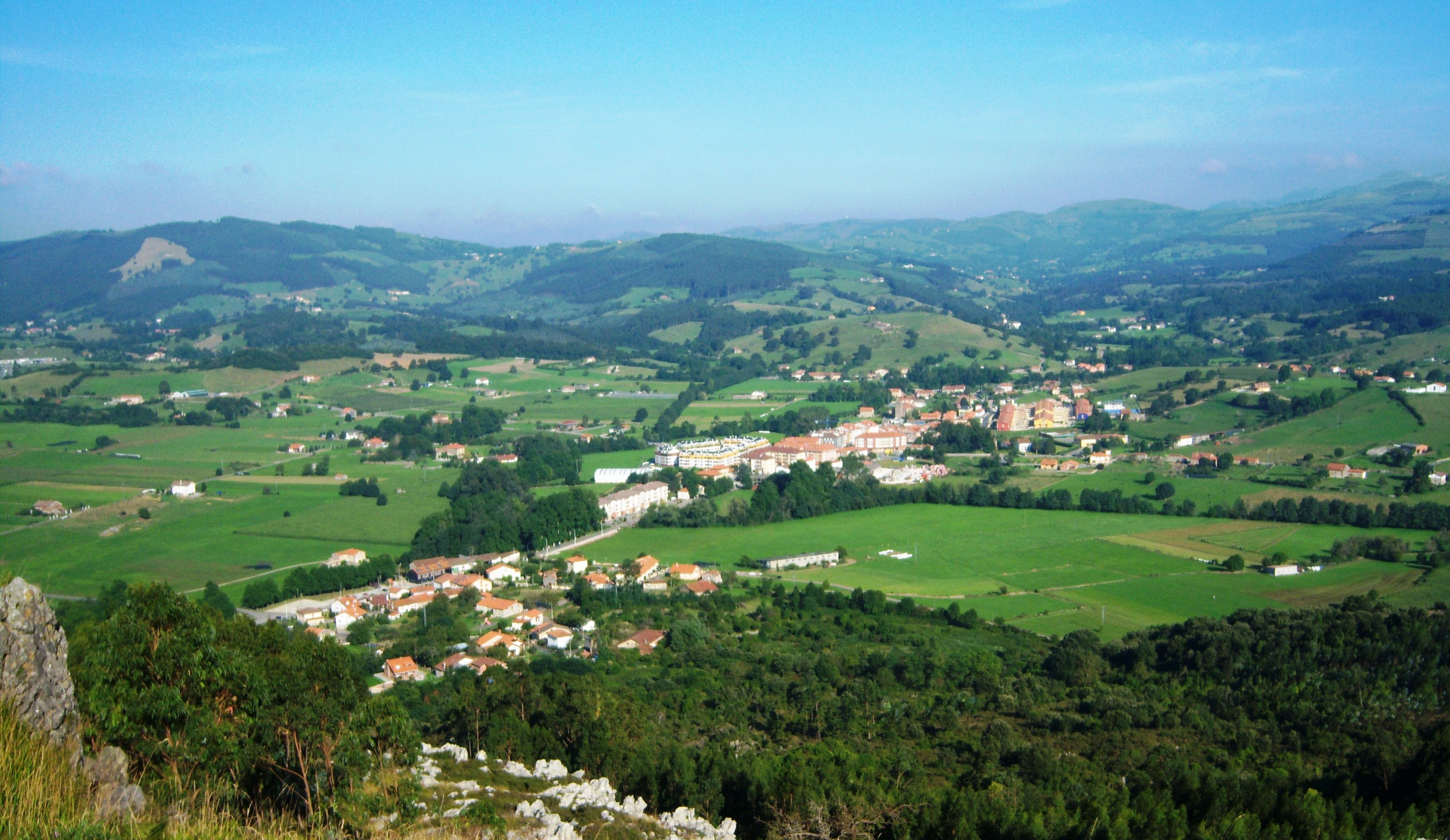
- View to the village of Entrambasaguas from the Vizmaya Peak.

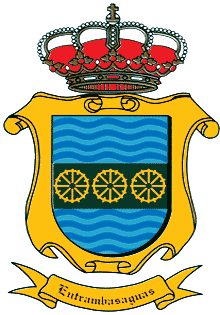
- Coat of arms

- Location of Entrambasaguas

- Location in Spain
- Coordinates: 43°22′40″N 3°40′36″W
- Country: Spain
- Autonomous community: Cantabria
- Province: Cantabria
- Comarca: Trasmiera
- Judicial district: Medio Cudeyo
- Capital: Entrambasaguas

Government
  - Alcalde: María Jesús Susinos Tarreroa (2003) (PP)

Area
  - Total: 43.2 km^{2} (16.7 sq mi)
- Elevation: 45 m (148 ft)

Population (2025-01-01)
  - Total: 5,693
  - Density: 132/km^{2} (341/sq mi)
- Time zone: UTC+1 (CET)
  - Summer (DST): UTC+2 (CEST)
- Website: Official website

Entrambasaguas is a small municipality located in the autonomous community of Cantabria, Spain, 25 km south of the Bay of Santander. It is moderately mountainous, and the origin of the Aguanaz River, which once drove 23 watermills and merges with the Miera River. Limestone caves with Paleolithic rock art and burial sites from the Bronze Age exist. Iron was mined here from prehistoric times, used in the Royal Artillery Factory of La Cavada, which supplied the Armada, and eventually brought some wealth during the Renaissance. First mentioned in 1210, this rural area of Green Spain consists of six towns an area of 43.2 square km, totaling about 5,000 inhabitants as of 2015, having nearly doubled since 2005.

== Geography ==
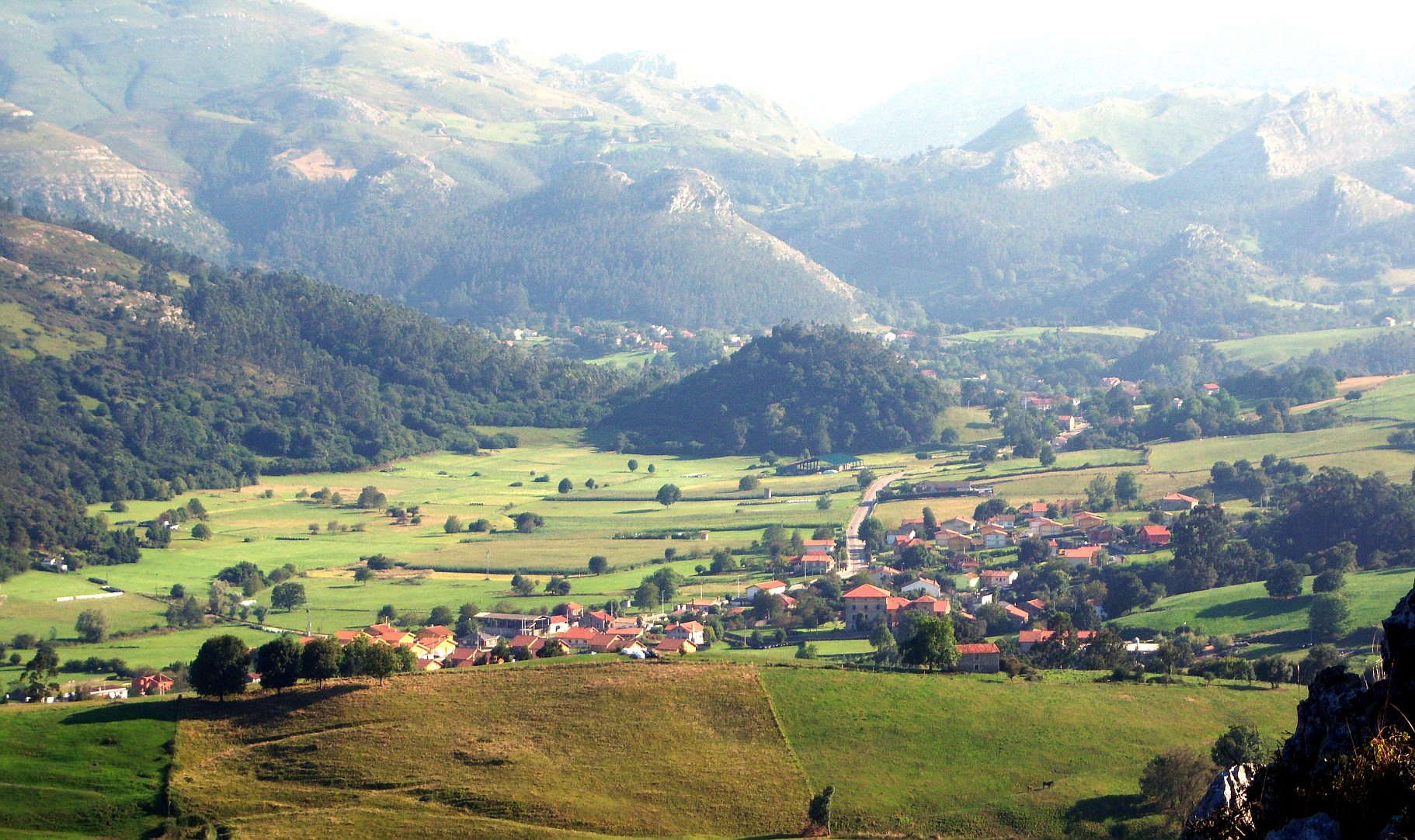
Panoramic of the village of Navajeda, in the municipality of Entrambasaguas.

=== Human ===
Entrambasaguas is one of 102 Cantabrian municipalities. It is located in the Trasmiera region (tras Miera, meaning behind the River Miera), 25 km southeast of the bay of Santander. Adjacent municipalities are Ribamontán del Monte, Marina de Cudeyo, Medio Cudeyo, Riotuerto and Solórzano.

Entrambasaguas consists of six towns, namely Entrambasaguas (proper), El Bosque, Navajeda, Puente Aguero, Hornedo, Hoznayo and Santa Marina, which extend over an area of 43.2 km^{2}.

=== Topography ===
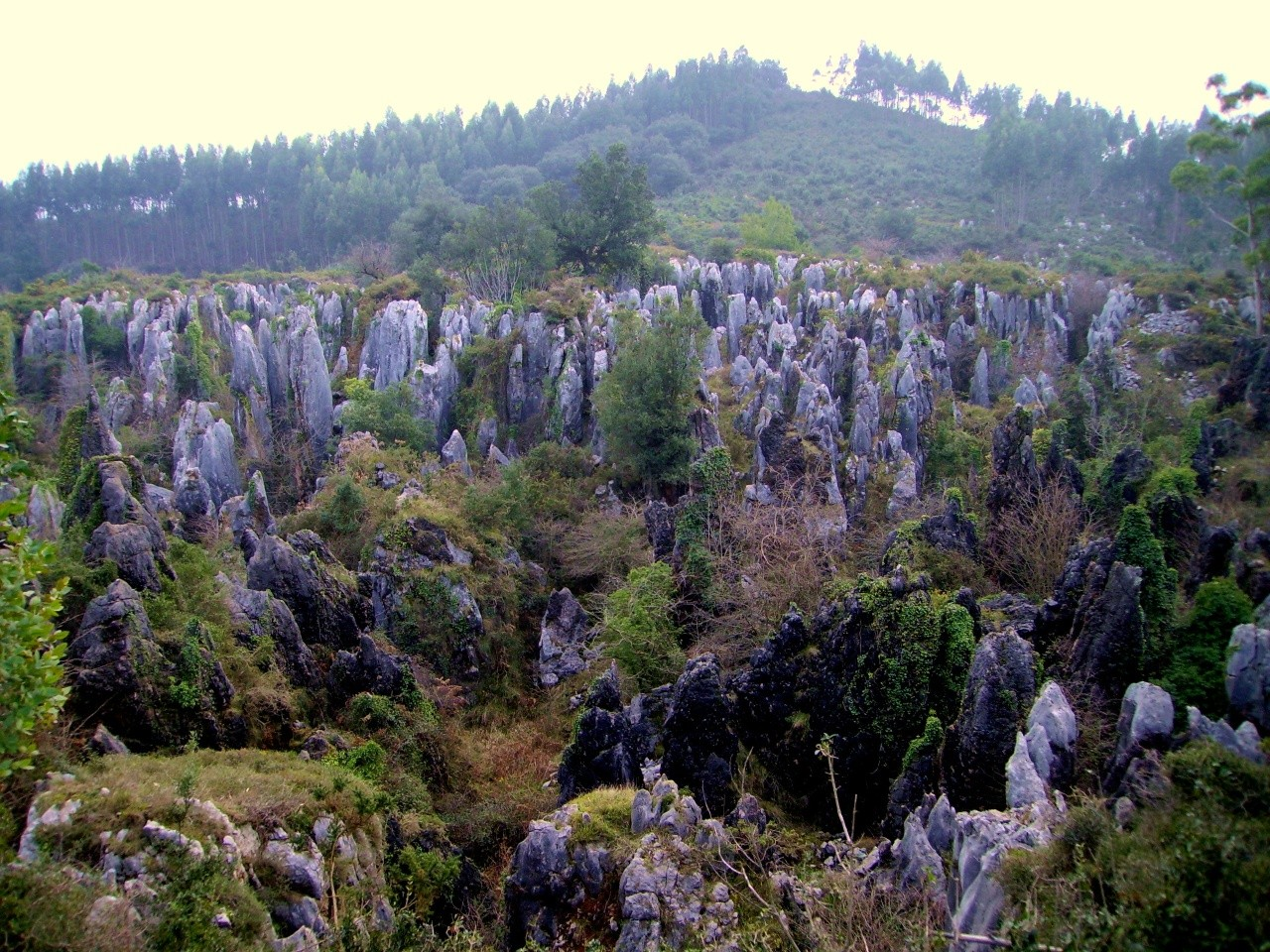
Old iron mineral mine in Monte Vizmaya, Cantabria.

Entrambasaguas lies in the southern arc of the Bay of Santander and has a smooth topography. Two rivers, the Miera River and its tributary the Aguanaz, flow through its traditionally rural landscape of moderately high mountains and patches of woodland and cow pasture. Mount Vizmaya forms the gentle relief of Entrambasaguas; it is a 249 meter high rugged limestone massif with various caves and the vestiges of a Cantabrian castle serving as a vantage point at its peak. There are remains of 19th century iron mining and lime kilns from mining of limestone.

The Miera is one of the main rivers of Cantabria and has been declared a 'site of community importance' for being a natural area that helps preserve habitats and endangered species. The Miera has fishing reserves and originates in the portillo de lunada (lit.: halfmoon passage). After passing through San Roque de Riomiera it disappears from the surface, embedded in rough limestone slopes up to the town of Liérganes, where it resurfaces again. After passing through La Cavada and the landscape of the Trasmiera, it ends its course in the ría de Cubas, leading to the Bay of Santander. The Aguanaz is also born by a karstic spring located in the district of San Antonio, which after crossing Entrambasaguas and Hoznayo passes through the natural bridge of the Fuente del Francés joining the Miera River in Villaverde de Pontones.

=== Natural environment ===
Entrambasaguas has several communal mountain forests of eucalyptus and native species for logging. The forests also contain oaks, beeches and birches, pine trees and a barberry shrub (arbusto espinosa) used in homeopathy, with fruits that are edible when steamed. An otherwise rare tree species in Cantabria is the poisonous lluvia de oro (Laburnum anagyroides, lit.: "rain of gold"), with its name-giving yellow flowers. The municipality has a communal hunting ground with rabbits, deer and wild boar. Though there are no actual mountain routes, there are field paths up and around Mount Vizmaya and through the villages.

== History ==
Entrambasaguas has been inhabited since prehistoric times. Several sites bear witness of Paleolithic settlement with continued use through the Bronze Age. Hoznayo has two caves from the Paleolithic era, the Recueva cave, which has been heavily disturbed by poachers and the Cueva del Francés. The Navajeda cave was first explored in 1922 by a priest named Jesús Carballo, who found Palaeolithic strata and burial sites from the Bronze Age. Bronze Age materials and cave paintings were found in the Cueva del Eucaliptal (lit. 'cave of the eucalyptus plantation'), the "cueva de Bocarones" and the "cueva de los Murciélagos" (lit.: bat cave).

Two sites dating back to the Middle Ages are the upper necropolis of Entrambasaguas from the 9th to 12th century, and Mount Vizmaya in Hoznayo, featuring ceramic shards and construction from the time of the Reconquista. In medieval times the place established itself as "Entre amas aguas" (lit.: between the two waters), probably referring to the dense network of its water channels, mentioned in the Libro de la Montería of Alfonso XI of Castile. Its main artery is the river Aguanaz, which became the greatest source of wealth for settlers who established water mills and flour mills.

The municipality was first mentioned in 1210, in the cartulary of the Abbey of Santa Maria in Santoña. In the late Middle Ages, Entrambasaguas came under the aristocratic governance of the House of Agüero. Some of the places during that period appear in medieval documents, as for example Navajeda, whose inhabitants in 1407 claimed the privilege of being "exempt of extraordinary tax" and being linked to Santa Maria of Santoña. This relationship continued until the 17th century, when Entrambasaguas became part of the Junta de Cudeyo, which is within the district of the Cuadro Villas de la Costa del Mar. In the 18th century, its members participated in early attempts to create the province of Cantabria. Iron mines supplied minerals to the cannon factory of Lierganes and the Royal Artillery Factory of La Cavada, which operated from 1637 until 1835.

In 1822, Navajeda instituted a Constitutional Council with the same name, which Liérganes boasts today. By 1835, the town of El Bosque was added in a reform, while the municipality became head of a new judicial district for 50 years, the capital was moved to Santoña and 80 years later to Santander. Since 1992, El Bosque has been part of Medio Cudeyo. The modern municipality arose from a reorganization of the Junta de Cudeyo during the 19th century, which had consisted of Marina de Cudeyo, Medio Cudeyo, Liérganes, Riotuerto, and Miera.

== Cultural heritage ==
=== Related to water ===
Past economic activities in Entrambasaguas define a good part of its cultural heritage, and are directly related to the rivers that run through them. The Spa at the Fuente del Francés, the many water mills, and the Max milk powder factory owe their existence to the river Aguanaz.

The spa at the Fuente del Francés opened at the end of the 1870s. The hotel and bath house were built within a forest. In 1891 the Spa sprouted water from four thermal springs at 23 degrees Celsius, which was alkaline, rich in sodium chloride and bicarbonate, and was named Dela Virgen, de los Remedios, Santa Lucia, Dela Grotto and San Roque, respectively. In the 1890s the spa began to decline. As of 2016, a mill from the lock, and one of two mills that were part of the Fuente were in good condition and part of the 2001 general inventory of cultural heritage of Cantabria. Another mill, La Tejera, was added to the inventory in February 2003.

A total of 23 water mills once operated in Entrambasaguas. The high number and strong social significance of mills is reflected in the official coat of arms with three water wheels. The mills stood on the river Aguanaz, and to a lesser extent on the Miera River. Historical documents indicate that the flow of these rivers was generally sufficient to keep them active during droughts when other nearby mills stopped, which brought business to Entrambasaguas. The mills were small, with one, two or three wheels; some belonged to the community while others were private and sold milling days to whoever wished to use them at a certain time. Of the 23 original mills, 14 remain on the river Aguanaz, none of them active. bearing witness of an era in which mills were regulated, such as umpiring water use outside the main channels, prescribing minimum distances between them, prohibiting excessive water use that could lead to shortages or contamination of drinking water which the community depended on. Ordinances also established marital quotas for millers and gave them moral recommendations on conduct.

A former milk powder factory, (fábrica de productos dietéticos Max) still stands in San Antonio, a district of the town of Entrambasagas. It is an example of industrial architecture built in the rationalist style of the 1930s. It was built by Maximilian Berlowitz Feinstein (1882), a German pharmacist who graduated from the University of Würzburg, and successfully established himself in Spain. In 1935, the Ministry of Industry and Trade asked him to build the factory, as Spain had to import milk powder at the time. Berlowitz chose Entrambasaguas as a location for the new factory because it had cows, good forage, and the water of the river Aguanaz, which was not only clean but also had the right temperature. As of 2016, the factory houses a center of environmental education for children.

The Puente Agüero bridge over the Miera river, built in the Middle Ages, was key for east–west travel; its present state is from 1737, as restored in 2001.

=== Architecture ===
Two palaces in Entrambasaguas from the 17th and the 18th century have been declared "assets of cultural interest" as historical monuments: the Renaissance Palace of Acebedo of Hoznayo and the Palace of Fernández de Velasco.

In 2007, several portals were included in the general inventory of the cultural heritage of Cantabria: those in the Carasa Arredondo and Sierra neighborhood in Hoznayo; those of Pezuela, Ocina, and Arenas in Entrambasaguas proper; and those of the Palace of Navajeda and of the Tigu(n)din neighborhood in Hornedo. Of these, Carasa Arredondo from around 1680 stands out as one of the most remarkable examples of art stonework in Entrambasaguas. Like the San Martin house in Ocina, it is unique for its early introduction of Baroque work.

== Demographics ==
Throughout the 20th century the population declined as a result of rural flight into metropolitan Santander, mainly since the 1970s. Most people live in the town of Entrambasaguas (859 as of 2001). The count was stable at about 2500 people until 2004, and since then has nearly doubled with the strongest increase in 2008.

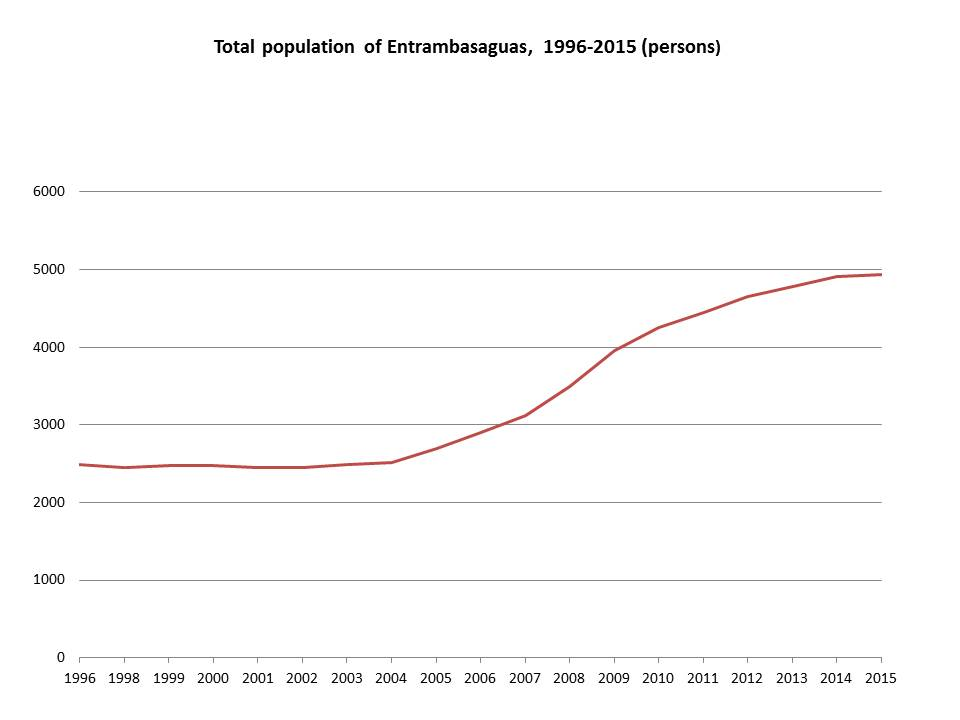
Line graph of population count, Entrambasaguas, Cantabria, 1996–2015, Instituto Nacional de Estadística

Census year	Persons
1996	2483
1998	2446
1999	2476
2000	2473
2001	2455
2002	2452
2003	2491
2004	2520
2005	2692
2006	2901
2007	3120
2008	3496
2009	3961
2010	4253
2011	4443
2012	4655
2013	4781
2014	4914
2015	4931

== Infrastructure and transport ==
Entrambasaguas can be reached by car, bus or train as follows:

=== Car ===
- via the federal highway system either on the autovía from Bilbao, exit 194 in Hoznayo (A8) or from Santander, exit 197 Hoznayo (between kilometer 195 and 198), which connects to N-634, CA-146 and CA-423.
- through the national highway network N-634, (between kilometer 194 and 198) corresponding with Alto de Marín crossing the river Miera.
- in combination with the network of regional conventional roads, the "Carreteras de Cantabria":CA-146: Hoznayo - Galizano, CA-161: Solares - La Cavada
- A dense network of roads between Navajeda and Entrambasaguas connects with Riotuerto and the road to Alisas, as well as CA-422: Orejo - Villaverde de Pontones, CA-423: Fuente del Francés - Villaverde de Pontones, CA-424: Hoznayo - Villaverde de Pontones, CA-651: Alto Marín - La Cavada, CA-652: Hoznayo - Riaño.

=== Railroad ===
As of 2016 a FEVE train from Santander to Lierganes stops in nearby Solares.

=== Bus ===
As of 2016, the nearest ALSA stop for the municipality of Entrambasaguas is in Solares. A bus on the thoroughway to Santander for example stops every 60 minutes.

== Administration ==
During the municipal election in 2015, the People's Party (PP) kept its absolute majority, winning 49% of the votes (from 63% in 2011), followed by the Regionalist Party of Cantabria (P.R.C.) (35%) and the Spanish Socialist Workers' Party (PSOE) (11%), with a voter participation of 2748 people (73%).

In the Spanish general election, 2015, 37% voted for PP, 31% for the P.R.C. and about 9% for Podemos, Ciudadanos 8% and PSOE 7%. The judicial district for Entrambasaguas is Medio Cudeyo, with main seat in Solares, where for example title registry for real estate recording is located.

== Economy ==
The economy of Entrambasaguas has traditionally been based on agriculture, growing crops, and pasture for dairy cattle, which dominated until the 1980s. Since then the economy has become more mixed, as small industries including catering businesses have emerged, particularly after the municipality became connected to the A8 along the Santander-Bilbao corridor. About 20% of working adults were employed in the primary sector, 32% in construction and industry, and 48% were in the tertiary sector. In 2001 a caster of ship propellers started business, and in 2003 Altadis opened a cigar manufacturing plant employing more than 300. In 2015 Cantabria invested 600,000 euros into expanding the capacity of the Entrambasaguas water treatment plant (Estación de Tratamiento de Agua Potable del Plan Aguanaz) to address "turbidity problems".

Entrambasaguas is one of 42 Cantabrian municipalities with geographic indication for the sobao, a square shaped butter sponge, which is well known across all of Spain.

== Notable people ==
- Juan Bautista de Acevedo (Hoznayo, 1555-Madrid, 1608), a cleric, studied at the Jesuit grammar school in Leon, enjoyed the protection of the Marquis of Denia, and Philip II, became Bishop of Valladolid in 1601, and Grand Inquisitor and patriarch of the Indies (1605), President of the Council of Castile (1608).
- Fernando de Acebedo (Hoznayo, 1569–Burgos, 1630), a cleric, educated by Jesuits, appointed royal chaplain by Philip II, Canonical leader of Toledo, Abbot of the Collegiate Church of Santander, Inquisitor of Seville and attorney and board member of the Inquisition, Bishop of Osma-Sorio (1610 and 1613) Archbishop of Burgos (1613 and 1629) and President of the Council of Castile from in 1616 to 1621, during which the Plaza Mayor of Madrid (1617–1619) was built. After Felipe IV dismissed him from the council, he was appointed Counsellor of State, received an income in perpetuity and several titles in Italy. In 1621 he retired to Burgos, promoted construction of San Juan in Hoznayo and the chapel at his palace.
- Joaquín Cueto Otí (San Antonio, Entrambasaguas, 1925), a farmer and writer, considered a pioneer for reparcelling in Cantabria, which grouped the harvest of Hoznayo Calante in 1960, until it reached the villages of Navajeda, Islares and Habanos, president of the local agrarian chamber, co-founder of the independent association of ranchers and farmers of Santander (AIGA) and council member of Entrambasaguas. After retirement he wrote two dozen books.
- Víctor Fernández Llera ('John of Hoznayo'), a humanist and educator (Hoznayo, 1850–1923) born into a well-to-do family, studied philosophy and literature in Valladolid and Madrid, where he befriended Menéndez Pelayo. For several years lecturer of the Ateneo de Madrid then chair of Latin and Castilian studies at the Instituto Licenciado Cascales of Murcia (1889) where he stayed for almost twenty years, returning to Santander in 1908. Throughout his life he organized public lectures, authored grammar and vocabulary of the award-winning Fuero Juzgo (1929), a recasting of the six comedies of Scipio Africanus (1890) and memories and confessions of Juan de Hoznayo, which began as a soap opera in La Atalaya (1921).
