= Trasmiera =

Coordinates: 43°24′40″N 3°36′33″W

- Comarca
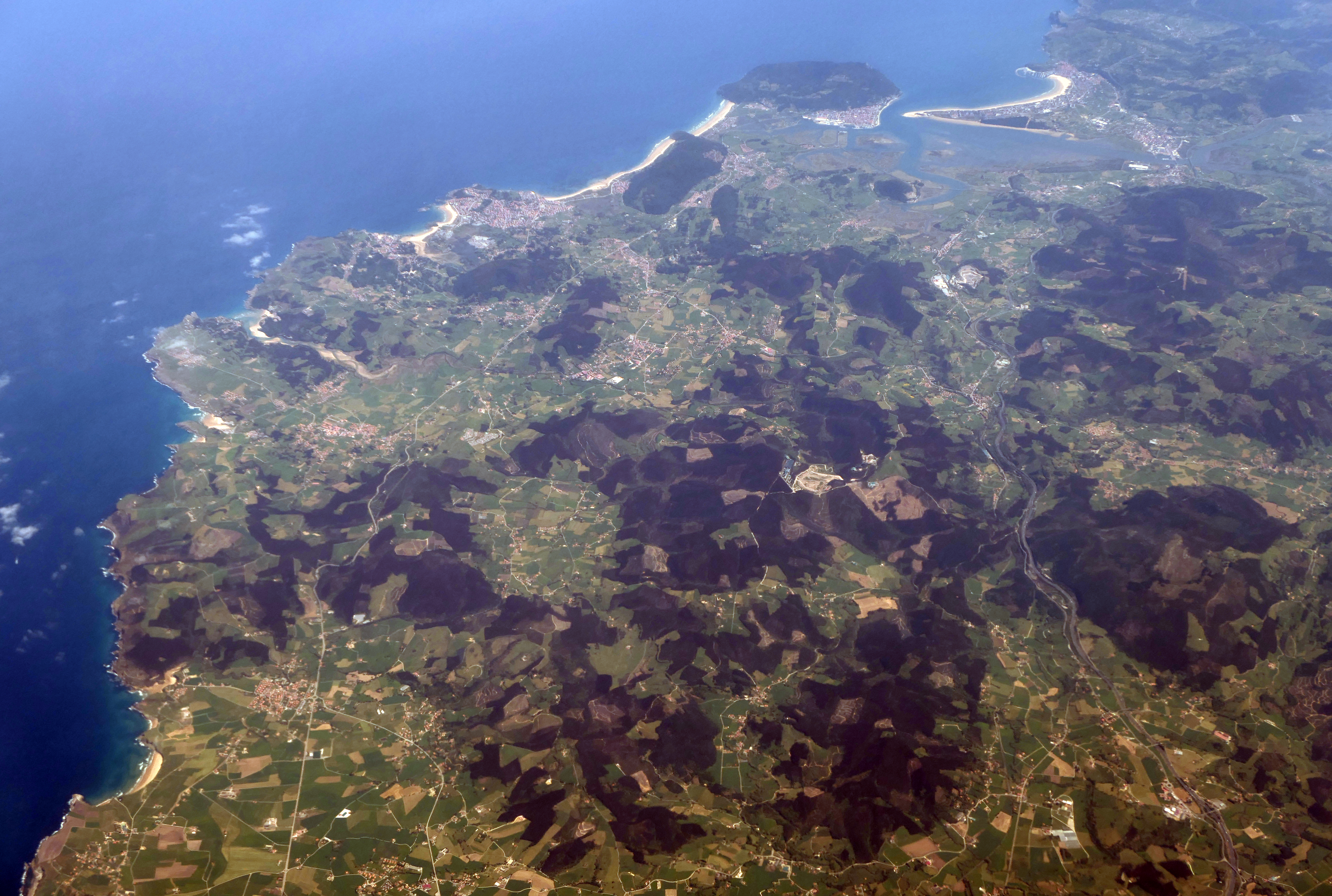

- Coat of arms

- Country: Spain
- Autonomous community: Cantabria
- Province: Cantabria
- Capital: Ribamontán al Monte
- Municipalities: List: Argoños, Arnuero, Bárcena de Cicero, Bareyo, Entrambasaguas, Escalante, Hazas de Cesto, Liérganes, Marina de Cudeyo, Medio Cudeyo, Meruelo, Miera, Noja, Ribamontán al Mar, Ribamontán al Monte, Riotuerto, Santoña, Solórzano, Voto

Area
  - Total: 557.97 km^{2} (215.43 sq mi)

Population (2018)
  - Total: 60,477
  - Density: 108.39/km^{2} (280.72/sq mi)
- Demonym(s): trasmerano, -a
- Time zone: UTC+1 (CET)
  - Summer (DST): UTC+2 (CEST)

Trasmiera (Spanish: Trasmiera; Cantabrian and historically: Tresmiera) is a historic comarca of Cantabria (Spain), located to the east of the Miera River (tras Miera, meaning behind Miera, from the point of view of Asturias de Santillana), reaching the western side of the Asón. It extends between the bays of Santander and Santoña, occupying most of the Eastern seaboard of Cantabria. This piece of coast is known for its cliffs and fine beaches, such as those of Langre, Loredo, Isla, Noja and Berria. Towards the interior, the comarca offers large prairies as well as considerable hotel and camping development.

== Municipalities ==
Trasmiera is composed of the 19 municipalities of Argoños, Arnuero, Bárcena de Cicero, Bareyo, Entrambasaguas, Escalante, Hazas de Cesto, Liérganes, Marina de Cudeyo, Medio Cudeyo, Meruelo, Miera, Noja, Ribamontán al Mar, Ribamontán al Monte, Riotuerto, Santoña, Solórzano and Voto. Their areas and populations are as follows:

Name	Area (km^{2})	Population (2001)	Population (2011)	Population (2018)
Argoños	5.5	1,035	1,699	1,723
Arnuero	24.7	1,826	2,119	2,108
Bárcena de Cicero	36.6	2,478	4,107	4,186
Bareyo	32.4	1,733	2,065	1,972
Entrambasaguas	43.2	2,399	4,636	5,090
Escalante	19.1	742	762	771
Hazas de Cesto	21.9	1,220	1,510	1,541
Liérganes	36.7	2,305	2,444	2,370
Marina de Cudeyo	28.4	5,058	5,264	5,118
Medio Cudeyo	26.8	6,287	7,588	7,520
Meruelo	16.4	1,188	1,781	1,982
Miera	33.8	488	431	389
Noja	9.2	2,104	2,653	2,539
Ribamontán al Mar	36.9	3,688	4,475	4,447
Ribamontán al Monte	42.2	2,005	2,165	2,257
Riotuerto	30.5	1,466	1,634	1,609
Santoña	11.5	11,053	11,468	11,060
Solórzano	25.5	991	1,033	1,050
Voto	77.7	2,260	2,772	2,745

== History ==
Its history starts in prehistoric times, evidences of whom can be found at the caves of Puente Viesgo, La Garma (Omoño), Santoña and Miera. On the other hand, no trace of Roman presence is known in the area, except in Santoña bay, for the romanization of this zone was scarce and weak. On the contrary, the culture of the Cantabri persisted until the end of the Visigoth monarchy. Between the 8th and 10th centuries a great process of repopulation took place, which indicates that these lands were almost uninhabited.

King Alfonso I of Asturias (739-757), Duke of Cantabria, ordered the resettlement of what now is known as the comarca of Trasmiera, where there was little presence of human settlements. The repopulation was done following the habits of the time, with the help of small monasteries, around which immediately appeared family settlements which would reach village status, marking the origin for future small towns or villas. The monks received in exchange the property of the barren lands with the condition of having to cultivate them.

The most ancient repopulation monasteries were those of San Vicente de Fístoles (in Esles de Cayón) and Santa María del Puerto (in Santoña), the latter having a large jurisdictional scope that lasted until the 16th century; however, from the 11th century on it was forced to depend on the monastery of Santa María la Real in Nájera (La Rioja) by royal order, and so it remained until the 19th century when the Desamortización caused the dissolution of the monasteries.

In the documents of the 11th century, the comarca of Trasmiera appears as a geographic and administrative entity. This delimitation has contributed to the conservation of many ancestral habits and activities through the centuries. One unusual activity that endured until recent times were tide mills, a good example of which is in the town of Isla.

=== Merindad of Trasmiera ===
From the 13th century on, this demarcation was established as administrative entity by royal order. The king was represented by a merino, which at first was a person from the Burgalese Lara family. The capital of the merindad was in Hoz de Anero where the Assemblies of Cudeyo, Ribamontán, Siete Villas, Cesto and Voto took place. When some years went by, the administrators or merinos passed to be elected from the native families of Trasmiera.

== Master masons of Trasmiera ==
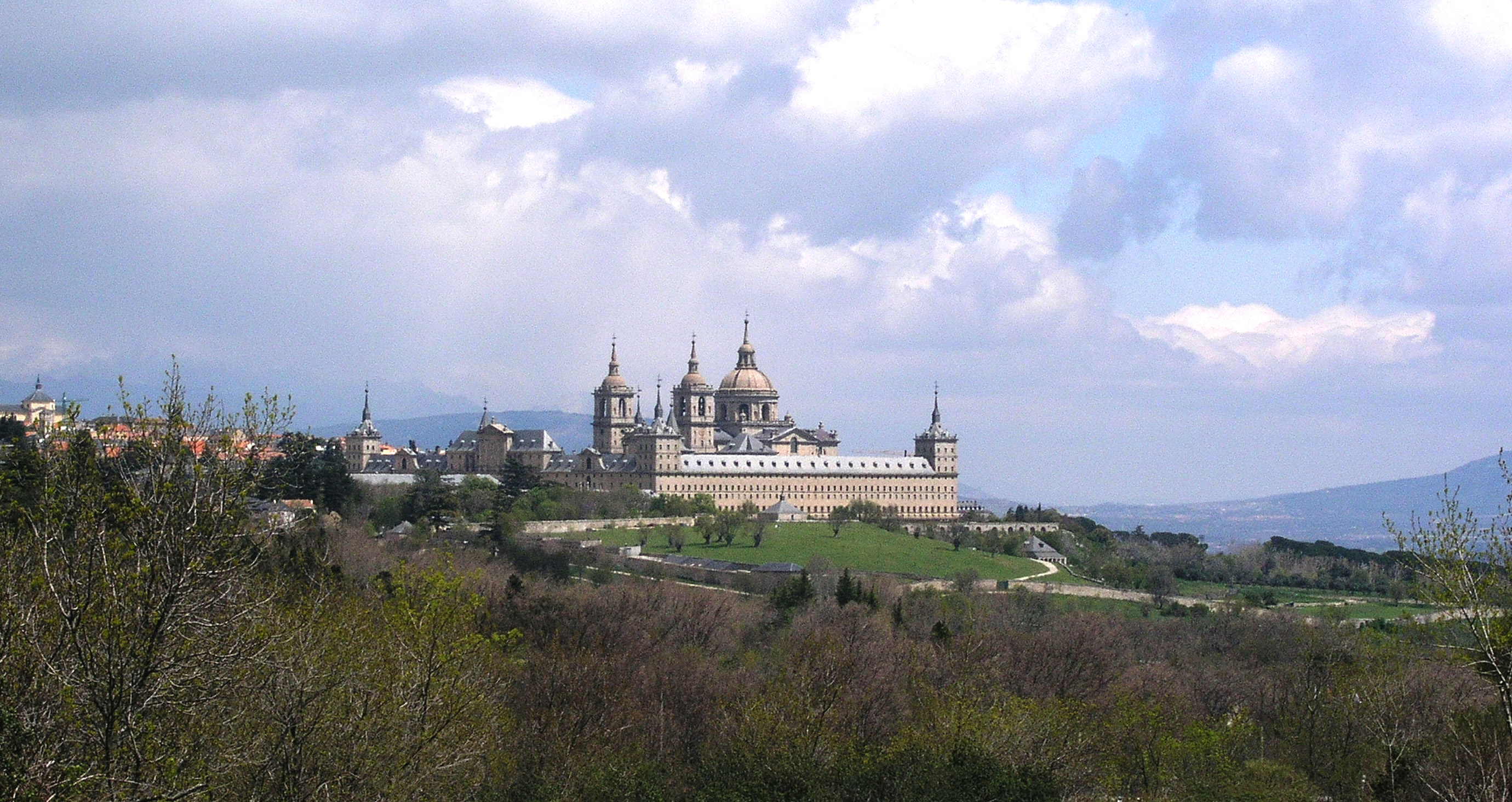
El Escorial Monastery, one of the works of the Trasmeran masons

The fame of the master masons of this comarca goes back to the Middle Ages. The job of mason needed good training, was traditional and had certain renown beyond the Trasmeran frontiers. During the 15th to 18th centuries masonry was at its very peak in Spain, Portugal and the African colonies. Many of them worked in the building of works so special as the El Escorial Monastery and the Cathedral of Sigüenza, and great monuments in Galicia; however they barely left their mark in Cantabria.

It is known that at the beginning of the 12th century a large number of masons of Trasmiera were called to work in the construction of Avila's City Walls. From the 15th century on it is known by documents that they were working all around Castile and that they had positions of great responsibility. They saw themselves in the necessity of creating a guild association, an esoteric and reserved association in which they communicated by an especial jargon that only they knew. This jargon was called la pantoja. The job was transmitted from fathers to sons, so they enjoyed an especial learning that allowed them to be Masters, and thus to direct cathedral constructions before the thirties.

Contracts were temporal, and the emigration from the comarca generally took place in March, to come back for the winter. The most famous and most solicited masons were sometimes out of their homeland for years, and they only came back to get married or to administrate their properties, sometimes also to make their will; however they didn't lose their neighbour status in their hometowns, even if they stayed long years away from it. Normally the family name reflected their origin. Some of these masons achieved hidalgo status with their own heraldic arms granted by the king, and even occupying public charges sometimes.

=== Renowned masons and some of their works ===
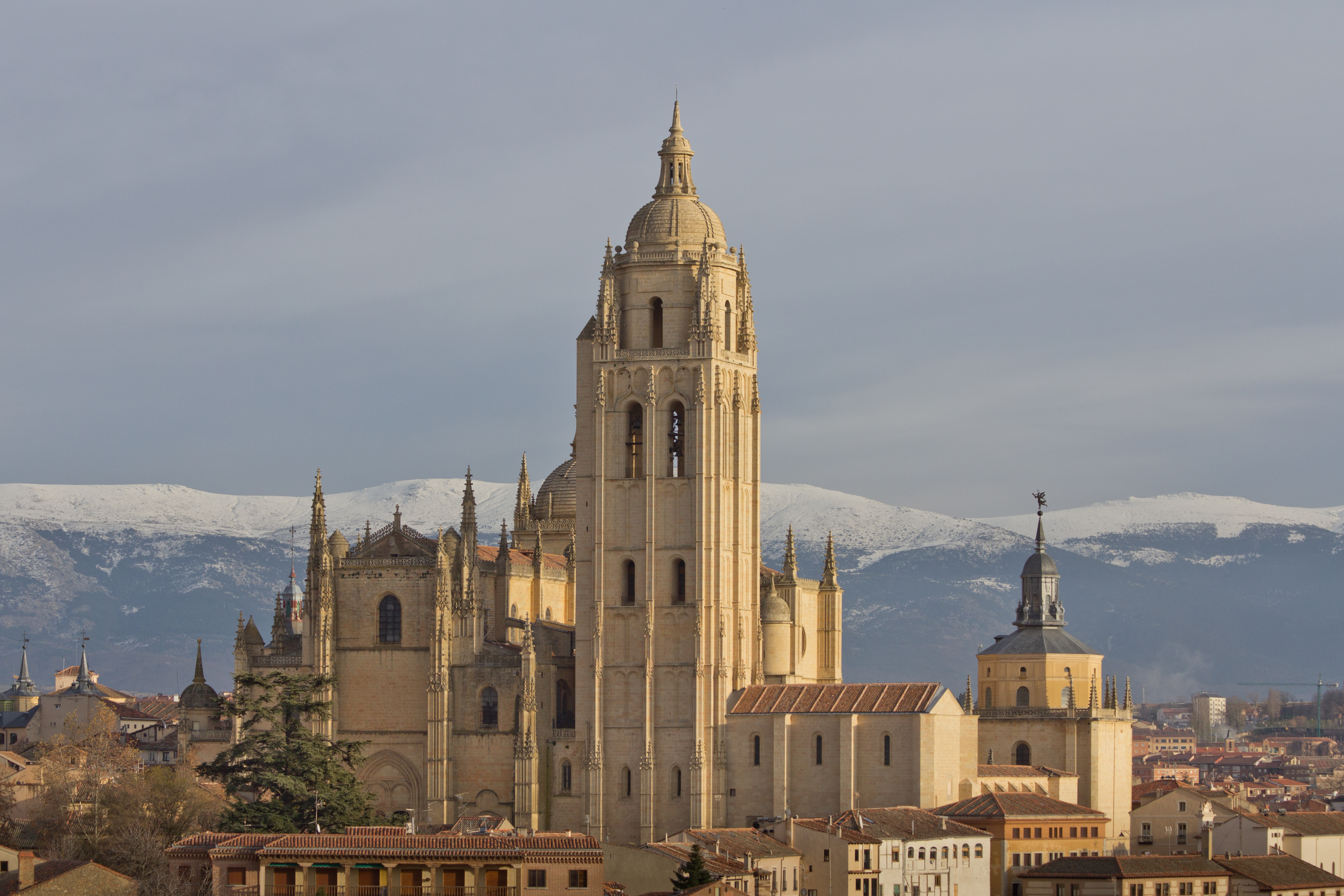
Cathedral of Segovia one of the works of Juan Gil de Hontañon

- Martín, Bartolomé y Gaspar de Solórzano: Cathedral of Palencia.
- Juan Gil de Hontañón: Cathedrals of Toledo, Segovia and Salamanca.
- Rodrigo Gil de Hontañón: Cathedrals of Valladolid, Segovia and Salamanca, Santiago de Compostela...
- Diego de Riaño: Cathedral and Town Hall of Seville.
- Juan de Herrera, the Trasmeran: Cathedral of Santiago de Compostela.
- Juan de Maeda: Cathedrals of Granada and Seville.
- Diego de Praves: Royal architect in Valladolid.
- Juan de Nates: Works in Valladolid.
- Francisco de Praves: Architect of the Duke of Lerma in Valladolid.
- Marcos de Vierna: General Commissioner of Public Works during the reigns of Ferndinand VI and Charles III.
- Valentín Mazarrasa: Works in Valladolid, Toro and Zamora.
- Julián Mazarrasa: Author of a treaty on architecture.

== Master altarpiece-makers ==
Another one of the traditional jobs of Cantabria and above all of the comarca of Trasmiera is the altarpiece-making; to conceive and compose an altarpiece, to come up with and arrange its design. Woodworking was very highly regarded during the Middle Ages and Renaissance. After the rules of the Council of Trent in 1563, which promoted the cult to icons and altarpieces, many workshops arose in this Cantabrian comarca. The highest peak is from the 17th century, from when much documentation exists.

Some altarpiece-makers as Simón de Bueras, Juan de Alvarado or Bartolomé de la Cruz reached great prestige and were called to work in La Rioja, Castile and the Basque Country. The so-called Masters of the Seven Villas (around Santoña bay) were the ones who had more contact with the Castilian workshops. Many of these altarpiece-makers were consummate architects and had fine workshops where carvers, carpenters, sculptors, gilders and a whole series of necessary jobs for their work's culmination. These are some of the essential jobs in an altarpiece-maker workshop:

- Master architect, who organized the structure and presented the design
- Master carver, who was in charge of the decoration's motives
- Master carpenter
- Master sculptor
- Master painter, who did the colors
- Master gilder, who did the gilding and the artistic scraping

In addition to these consummated masters, many apprentices and officials worked in the workshops. During the first five years the master taught the apprentice and gave him food and shoes. After that, if the apprentice wanted to continue with the job, he spent another five years as official until he reached enough knowledge level in the job that allowed him to become independent and establish his own business.

=== Hiring and execution process ===
When there was need for an altarpiece work, a banner calling for these masters was placed in the church door on Sunday. After a month, the altarpiece-makers gathered in said church and there they showed their drawings, their devised design and their work and payment conditions to the clergy and butlers of the parish church. These men chose one of these offers, then showed it to all the contestants to commence the bidding. That auction lasted the time that a candle takes to consume (although some times it was three candles' time), and the job was given to the master whose bid was on top at that moment. The next requisite was that either the assigned master had to pay a warranty deposit, or he had to present other colleagues as guarantors. Once this session was finished, the contract was signed before a notary. There was also a commission of masters who were in charge of assuring that the project carried out as planned.

=== Style of the images in Trasmiera ===
The Roman influence of Michelangelo and his followers reflected in the first stage of the Counter-Reformation is the style which the Trasmeran masters complied with. Images are represented with great realism and expressivity; the suffering of the saints and martyrs is patent. The most clear example of this tendency is Juan de Anchieta, disciple of Juan de Juni. After that, the style of the masters evolved, and half past the 17th century they let into their work the influence of Gregorio Fernández. The altarpiece workhouses imitated and spread the new trends until the tastes changed, and by the end of that century images are gradually removed, so the altarpiece structure got represented by other kind of decoration.

== Master bellmakers ==
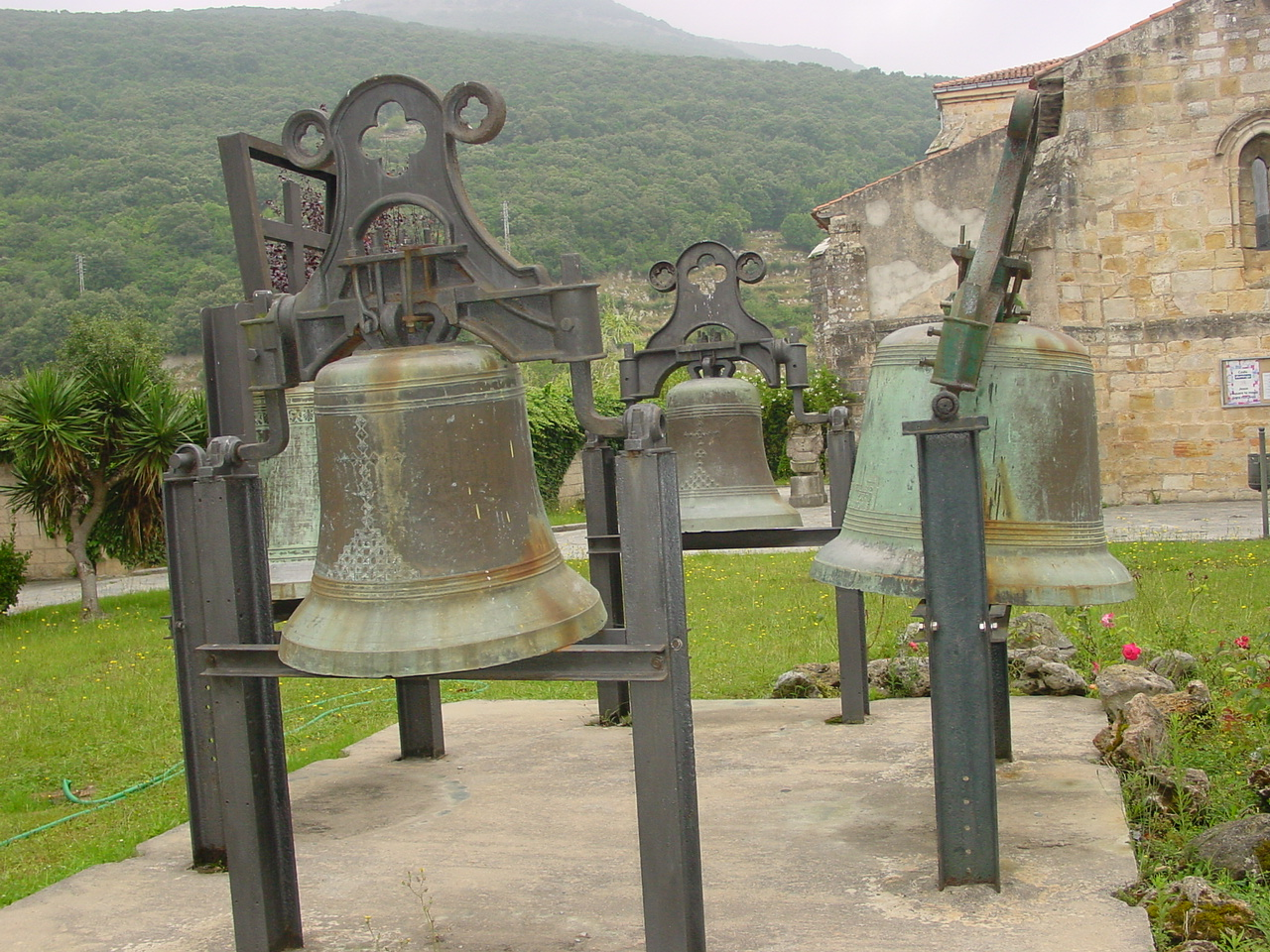
Trasmeran bells of the Santa María del Puerto church in Santoña, molten around the middle of the 20th century by the master bellmakers of Meruelo.

Bellfounding in Cantabria is tradition that goes back to the Middle Ages. The comarca of Trasmiera was a cradle for prestigious bellfounders, whose fame transcended the Spanish borders, which granted them works in some part of Europe and America. They reached such significance that many specialists remark that there is no cathedral, basilica or church that hasn't had in its belfries some work of a Cantabrian bellmaker.

In Trasmiera the job was carried out basically in the Seven Villas Assembly (made up of the villages of Ajo, Arnuero, Bareyo, Castillo Siete Villas, Güemes, Isla, Meruelo, Noja and Soano) where bellmaking workshops abounded then. This knowledge was transmitted from fathers to sons through the centuries, constituting real sagas of master bellmakers.

This importance allowed the fact that important cathedrals in Mexico or Peru have bells made by Trasmerans in situ. Thus, the bell called "La Cantabria" was founded in Lima in 1797 for its cathedral, demonstrating the significance of these artisans and their origin. In 1753, the bell considered the largest of Spain, weighing 22 tonnes, was made by master founders of Arnuero destined to the cathedral of Toledo, and whose making took two years. Some chronicles tell that when the bell was used for the first time, it broke all the glasses of the city and caused all the pregnant ladies to miscarry, which forced its makers to make holes in it to lower its ringing.

In 2004, as a wedding present to the Princes of Asturias, Cantabria gave them the "Virgen Bien Aparecida" bell, which weighs 1,600 kg and was founded in Gajano (Marina de Cudeyo) by two of the last master bellmakers and heirs to the Trasmeran tradition, the Portilla brothers.

== Bibliography ==
- CAMPUZANO RUIZ, Enrique. Cantabria. Pas y Miera. Trasmiera. Patrimonio Artístico Religioso, 2002. ISBN 84-931754-5-5
- Folleto turístico Cantabria infinita, editado por el Gobierno de Cantabria en julio de 2004.
- GARCÍA GUINEA, Miguel Ángel. Románico en Cantabria. Guías Estudio, 1996, Santander. ISBN 84-87934-49-8
