= Santoña, Victoria and Joyel Marshes Natural Park =

Coordinates: 43°25′58″N 3°28′57″W

Designations

Ramsar Wetland
- Official name: Marismas de Santoña
- Designated: 4 October 1994
- Reference no.: 707

The Santoña, Victoria and Joyel Marshes Natural Park is an estuary in Cantabria, protected as a natural park. It is one of the wetlands of most ecological value in the north of Spain, and is used as a winter refuge and migratory passage by many species of birds and fishes.

Formed by the Asón River, the park occupies 3,866 hectares, distributed among the municipalities of Argoños, Bárcena de Cicero, Colindres, Escalante, Laredo, Limpias, Noja, Santoña and Voto.

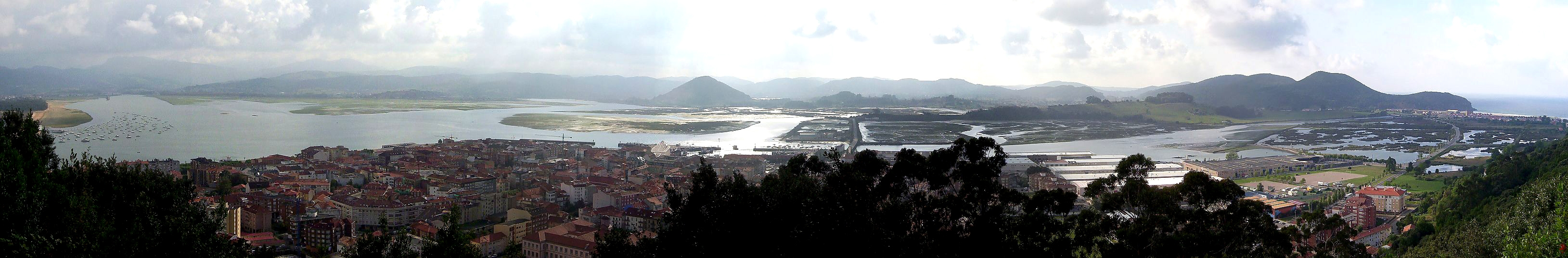
Panorama

== See also ==
- List of Ramsar sites in Spain
