= Jean Curtius =

Belgian arms trader (1551 – 1628)

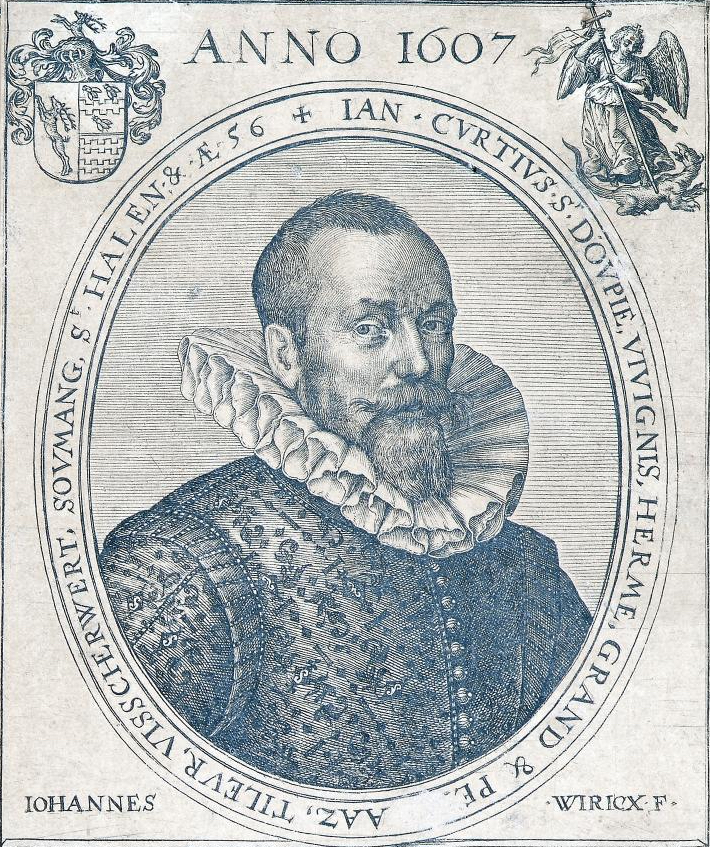
- Jean Curtius in 1607
- Born: Jean de Corte; 1551; Liège, Principality of Liège
- Died: July 12, 1628 (aged 76–77); Liérganes, Cantabria, Spain
- Other name: Curtius
- Occupation: industrialist (arms dealer)
- Spouse: Pétronille de Brazz
- Children: Pierre, Michel
- Parent(s): Jacques de Corte, Helwy de Doerne
- Relatives: 3 brothers

Jean Curtius, also known as Jean De Corte and Juan Curcio, called Curtius (1551 – July 12, 1628), was a Liégeois industrialist and manufacturer who obtained the monopoly on providing gunpowder to the Spanish army.

The mansion he built on the banks of the Meuse in Liège is now the Curtius Museum.

== Biography ==
He was the youngest of four brothers. He was in charge of a coal mine and the manufacture of powder and metal.

In 1613, after some economic problems derived from the end of peace of Spain with France, England and the United Provinces of the Netherlands starting in 1609, he goes to Biscay (VIzcaya in Spanish) with the aim of installing his industry there, since he mostly served the Spanish army. However, he was denied the ability to set up his industries there, so he searched for a different place where he would be able to install them. He ended up in Liérganes, Cantabria, Spain, where he built a mill and a forge. He also bought several forested areas as a source of raw materials.

After his death in 1628, Jorge de Bande took control of the industry, which went on to become one of the main weapon factories of the Spanish Empire (Royal Artillery Factory of La Cavada) in the neighbouring town of La Cavada.

== Gallery ==
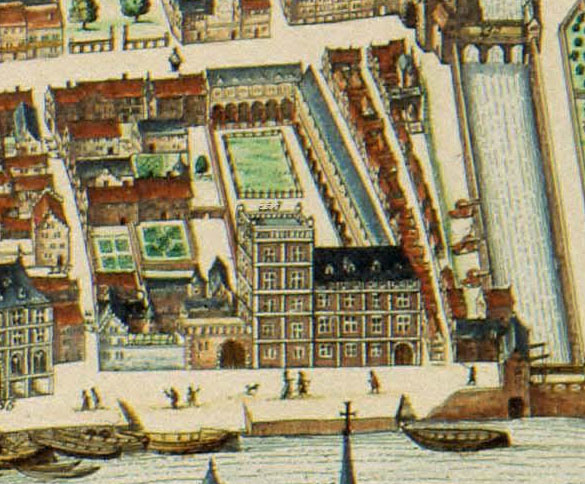
Maison Curtius, c. 1642.

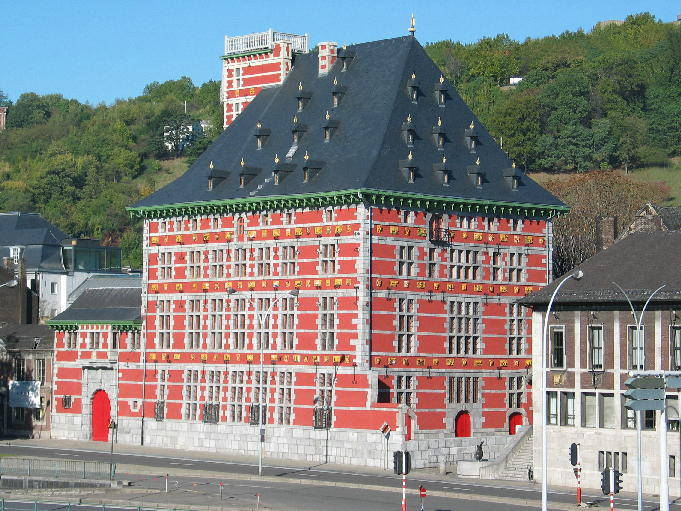
Curtius Museum, as restored in 2003
.

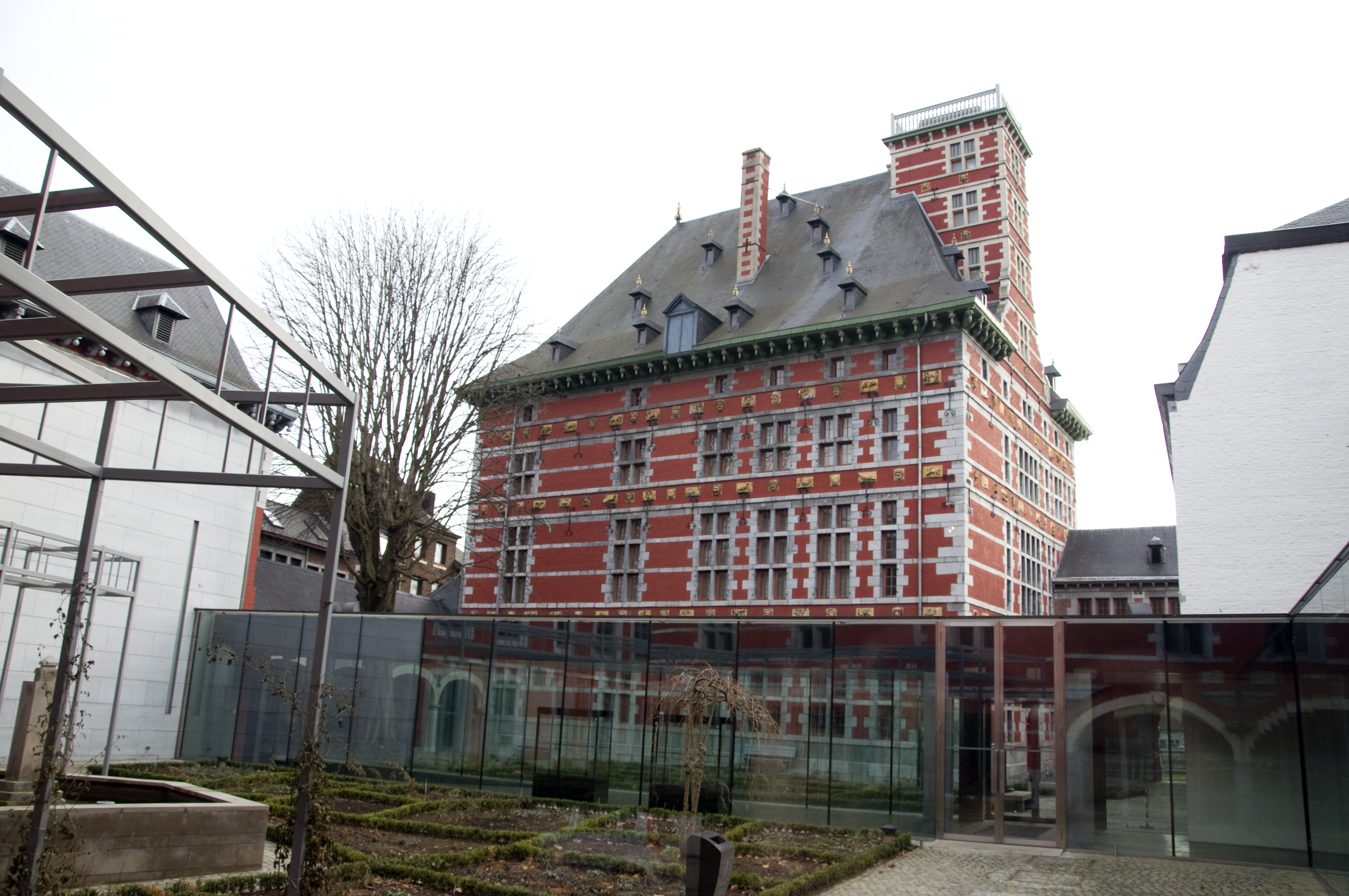
Rear facade of the Maison Curtius
.

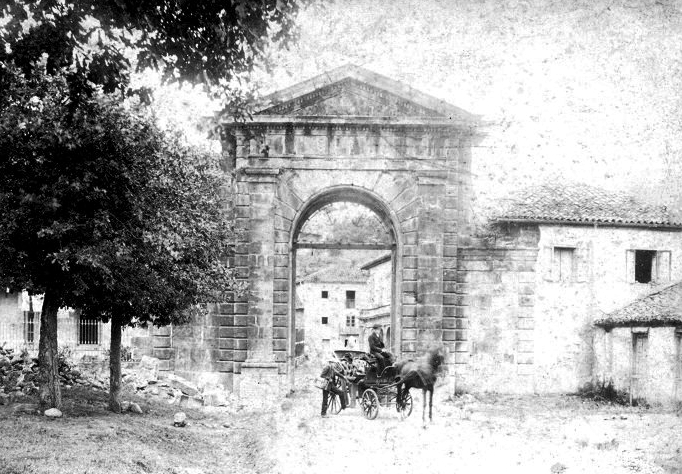
The gate of Curtius's La Cavada factory in Cantabria, Spain (1890)
.
