= Liérganes =

- Municipality
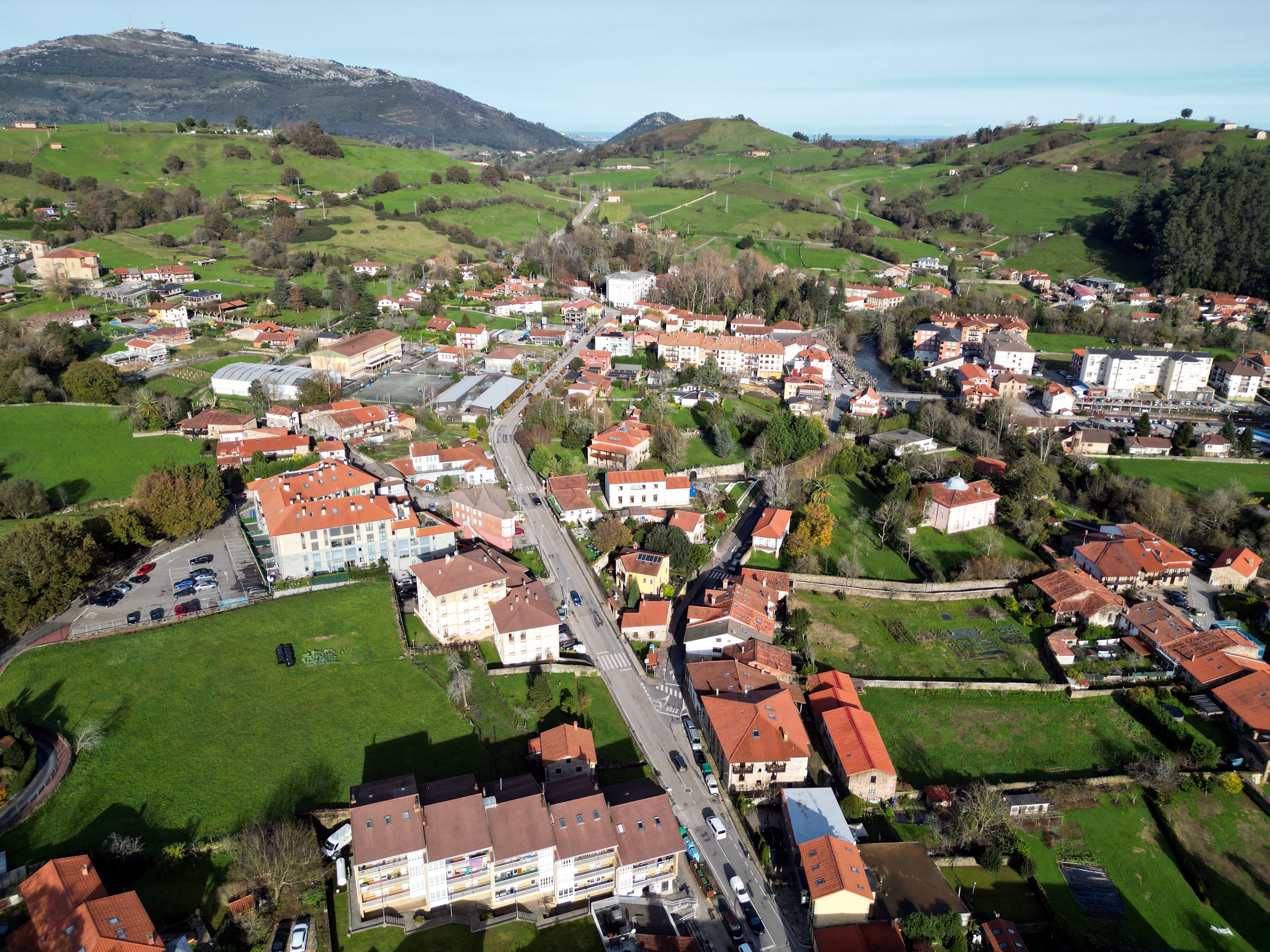
- Aerial view of Liérganes

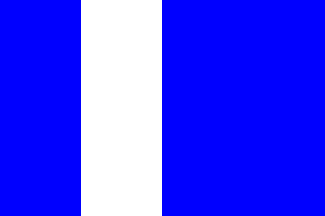
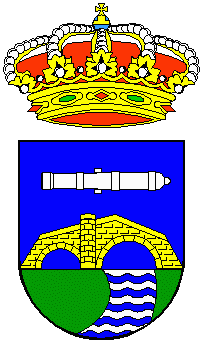
- Flag Coat of arms

- Location of Liérganes

- Location in Spain
- Coordinates: 43°20′36″N 3°44′28″W
- Country: Spain
- Autonomous community: Cantabria
- Province: Cantabria
- Comarca: Pas and Miera valleys
- Judicial district: Medio Cudeyo
- Capital: Liérganes

Government
  - Alcalde: Santiago Rego Rodríguez (2015) (ULP)

Area
  - Total: 36.73 km^{2} (14.18 sq mi)
- Elevation: 110 m (360 ft)

Population (2025-01-01)
  - Total: 2,365
  - Density: 64.39/km^{2} (166.8/sq mi)
- Demonym(s): Lierganés, sa
- Time zone: UTC+1 (CET)
  - Summer (DST): UTC+2 (CEST)
- Website: Official website

Liérganes is a municipality and a locality located in the autonomous community of Cantabria, Spain. It is bordered in the north by Medio Cudeyo, in the east by Riotuerto, in the south by Miera and in the west by Penagos. The river Miera flows through the village, supplying the spas of Liérganes. It has a rail link which links it to Santander. According to the 2007 census, the city has a population of 2,391 inhabitants. It has been named one of the most beautiful villages in Spain.

== Towns ==
- Bucarrero
- Calgar
- Casa del Monte
- El Condado
- La Costera
- Extremera
- La Herrán
- Liérganes (capital)
- El Mercadillo
- Las Porquerizas
- Los Prados
- La Quieva
- La Rañada
- El Rellano
- Rubalcaba
- La Vega
- Pámanes
- Somarriba
- Tarriba
