= CF Ribamontán al Mar =

Association football club in Spain

Coordinates: 43.462461°N 3.681301°W

Ribamontán
- Full name: Club de Fútbol Ribamontán al Mar
- Founded: 1971
- Ground: Baceñuela, Galizano, Ribamontán al Mar, Cantabria, Spain
- Capacity: 3,000
- Chairman: José Luis Aja
- Manager: Fernando Tejerina Ibañez
- League: Primera Regional
- 2024–25: Regional Preferente, 18th of 18 (relegated)
Home colours	Away colours

Club de Fútbol Ribamontán al Mar is a football team based in Galizano, Ribamontán al Mar in the autonomous community of Cantabria. Founded in 1971, the team plays in Primera Regional. The club's home ground is Baceñuela, which has a capacity of 3,000 spectators.

== History ==
In the 2018-19 season the club appeared in Tercera División after a four-years break, spent in Regional leagues. This season the club managed to remain its place in Tercera División, Group 3 by finishing 11th.

== Season to season ==
Season	Tier	Division	Place	Copa del Rey
1971–72	6	3ª Reg.	5th	
1972–73	6	3ª Reg.	3rd	
1973–74	5	2ª Reg.	6th	
1974–75	4	Reg. Pref.	16th	
1975–76	5	1ª Reg.	16th	
1976–77	6	2ª Reg.	1st	
1977–78	6	1ª Reg.	16th	
1978–79	6	1ª Reg.	13th	
1979–80	6	1ª Reg.	17th	
1980–81	7	2ª Reg.	4th	
1981–82	6	1ª Reg.	14th	
1982–83	6	1ª Reg.	20th	
1983–84	7	2ª Reg.	3rd	
1984–85	6	1ª Reg.	18th	
1985–86	6	1ª Reg.	1st	
1986–87	5	Reg. Pref.	1st	
1987–88	4	3ª	17th	
1988–89	4	3ª	19th	
1989–90	5	Reg. Pref.	3rd	
1990–91	4	3ª	15th	

Season	Tier	Division	Place	Copa del Rey
1991–92	4	3ª	15th	
1992–93	4	3ª	14th	
1993–94	4	3ª	11th	
1994–95	4	3ª	8th	
1995–96	4	3ª	5th	
1996–97	4	3ª	5th	
1997–98	4	3ª	8th	
1998–99	4	3ª	3rd	
1999–2000	4	3ª	16th	
2000–01	4	3ª	8th	
2001–02	4	3ª	11th	
2002–03	4	3ª	8th	
2003–04	4	3ª	8th	
2004–05	4	3ª	8th	
2005–06	4	3ª	8th	
2006–07	4	3ª	6th	
2007–08	4	3ª	10th	
2008–09	4	3ª	13th	
2009–10	4	3ª	10th	
2010–11	4	3ª	8th	

Season	Tier	Division	Place	Copa del Rey
2011–12	4	3ª	14th	
2012–13	4	3ª	16th	
2013–14	4	3ª	20th	
2014–15	5	Reg. Pref.	9th	
2015–16	5	Reg. Pref.	18th	
2016–17	6	1ª Reg.	2nd	
2017–18	5	Reg. Pref.	4th	
2018–19	4	3ª	11th	
2019–20	4	3ª	17th	
2020–21	4	3ª	11th / 10th	
2021–22	6	Reg. Pref.	12th	
2022–23	6	Reg. Pref.	8th	
2023–24	6	Reg. Pref.	8th	
2024–25	6	Reg. Pref.	18th	
2025–26	7	1ª Reg.		

- 28 seasons in Tercera División
