= Riaño =

Riaño may refer to one of the following places in Spain:

- Riaño, León, in the province of León
- Riaño, a locality of the municipality of Valle de Valdebezana
- Riaño, a locality of the municipality of Solórzano
- Riaño de Ibio, a locality of the municipality of Mazcuerras
- Riaño de Campoo, a parish in the municipality of Hermandad de Campoo de Suso
- Riaño (Langreo), a parish in the municipality of Langreo
