= Riano =

Riano may refer to:

- Riano, Lazio, a comune (municipality) in the province of Rome, Italy
- Riaño, León, in the province of León, Spain
- Riaño, a locality of the municipality of Valle de Valdebezana, Spain
- Riaño, a locality of the municipality of Solórzano, Spain
- Riaño de Ibio, a locality of the municipality of Mazcuerras, Spain
- Riaño de Campoo, a parish in the municipality of Hermandad de Campoo de Suso, Spain
- Riaño (Langreo), a parish in the municipality of Langreo, Spain
