= Voto =

Voto can refer to:

- Voto people, an indigenous group of Costa Rica
- Voto, Cantabria, a municipality in Spain

== See also ==
- Ex-voto, offering to a saint
