= Miera River =

River in Spain

Coordinates: 43°10′16″N 3°59′49″W

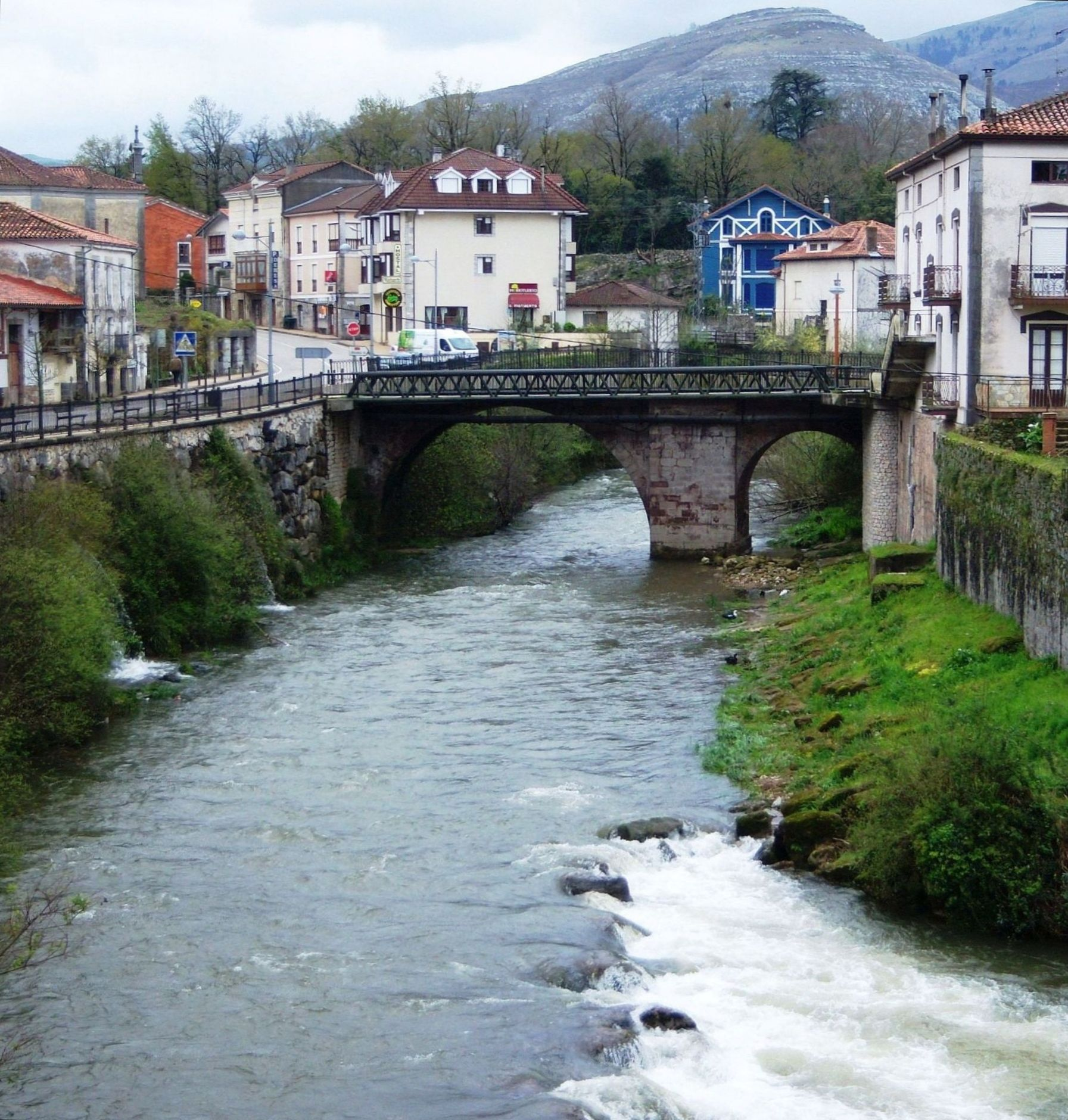
- Native name: Río Miera (Spanish)

Location
- Country: Spain
- Autonomous community: Cantabria

Physical characteristics
- Source
  - location: Castro Valnera
- Mouth: Cantabrian Sea
  - coordinates
  - elevation: 0 m (0 ft)
- Length: 57 km (35 mi)
- Basin size: 295 km^{2} (114 sq mi)
- Discharge
  - location: mouth

The Miera River (Spanish: Río Miera) is a river on the Cantabrian slope of the Iberian Peninsula that runs entirely within the autonomous community of Cantabria (Spain). It originates in the area known as Los Villares, in Castro Valnera at 1280 m and flows into the Cantabrian Sea through the Cubas estuary.

On its way, it crosses the Miera Valley, a narrow valley to which it gives its name, until it reaches the locality of Solares. At this point, the valley blurs and the river continues its course, marking the dividing line between the municipalities of Marina de Cudeyo and Ribamontán al Monte until it reaches the sea, where it delivers its waters to Santander Bay through the Cubas estuary.

== Etymology ==
The name Miera probably derives from Magrada or Mégrada cited by Pomponius Mela in the 1st century.
