= Hazas de Cesto =

- Municipality
- Coat of arms

- Location of Hazas de Cesto

- Location in Spain
- Coordinates: 43°23′49″N 3°35′23″W
- Country: Spain
- Autonomous community: Cantabria
- Province: Cantabria
- Comarca: Trasmiera
- Judicial district: Santoña
- Capital: Beranga

Government
  - Alcalde: José María Ruiz Gómez (2007) (PRC)

Area
  - Total: 21.9 km^{2} (8.5 sq mi)
- Elevation: 50 m (160 ft)

Population (2025-01-01)
  - Total: 1,957
  - Density: 89.4/km^{2} (231/sq mi)
- Time zone: UTC+1 (CET)
  - Summer (DST): UTC+2 (CEST)

Hazas de Cesto is a municipality located in the autonomous community of Cantabria, Spain. According to the 2007 census, the city has a population of 1,285 inhabitants. Its capital is Beranga.
