= Bareyo =

- Municipality
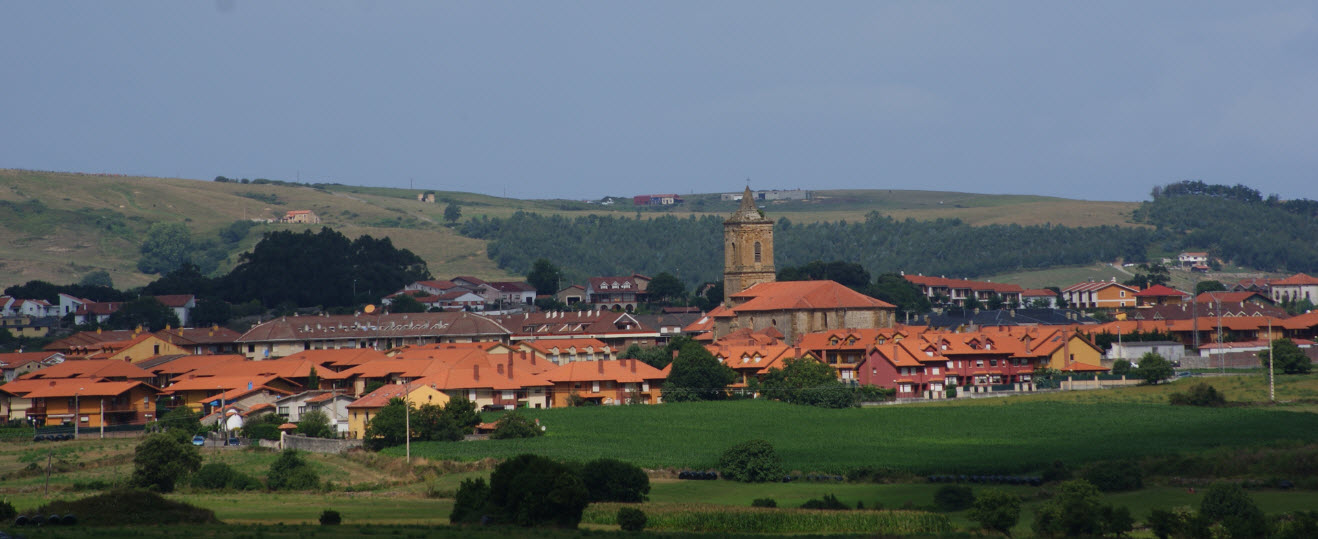
- View of Ajo, the capital of Bareyo

- Flag Coat of arms

- Location within Cantabria Bareyo (Spain)
- Coordinates: 43°28′56″N 3°36′39″W
- Country: Spain
- Autonomous community: Cantabria
- Province: Cantabria
- Comarca: Trasmiera
- Judicial district: Santoña
- Capital: Ajo

Government
  - Alcalde: José de la Hoz Lainz (2015) (PRC)

Area
  - Total: 32.44 km^{2} (12.53 sq mi)
- Elevation: 46 m (151 ft)

Population (2025-01-01)
  - Total: 2,124
  - Density: 65.47/km^{2} (169.6/sq mi)
- Time zone: UTC+1 (CET)
  - Summer (DST): UTC+2 (CEST)
- Website: Official website

Bareyo is a municipality located in the autonomous community of Cantabria, Spain. According to the 2007 census, the city has a population of 1.702 inhabitants. Its capital is Ajo.

== Towns ==
- Ajo (Capital)
- Bareyo
- Güemes
