= Rubalcaba =

Surname

Rubalcaba is a surname. Notable people with the surname include:

== People ==
- Alexis Rubalcaba (born 1972), Cuban boxer
- Alfredo Pérez Rubalcaba (1951–2019), Spanish politician
- Gonzalo Rubalcaba (born 1963), Cuban jazz pianist and composer
- Guillermo Rubalcaba (1927–2015), Cuban pianist, leader of Charanga Rubalcaba
- Jacobo Rubalcaba (1895–1960), Cuban trombonist, composer and bandleader
- Mario Rubalcaba (born 1972), Mexican American rock drummer, also known as Ruby Mars

== Places ==
- Rubalcaba, Cantabria, Spain
