= Bárcena de Cicero =

- Municipality
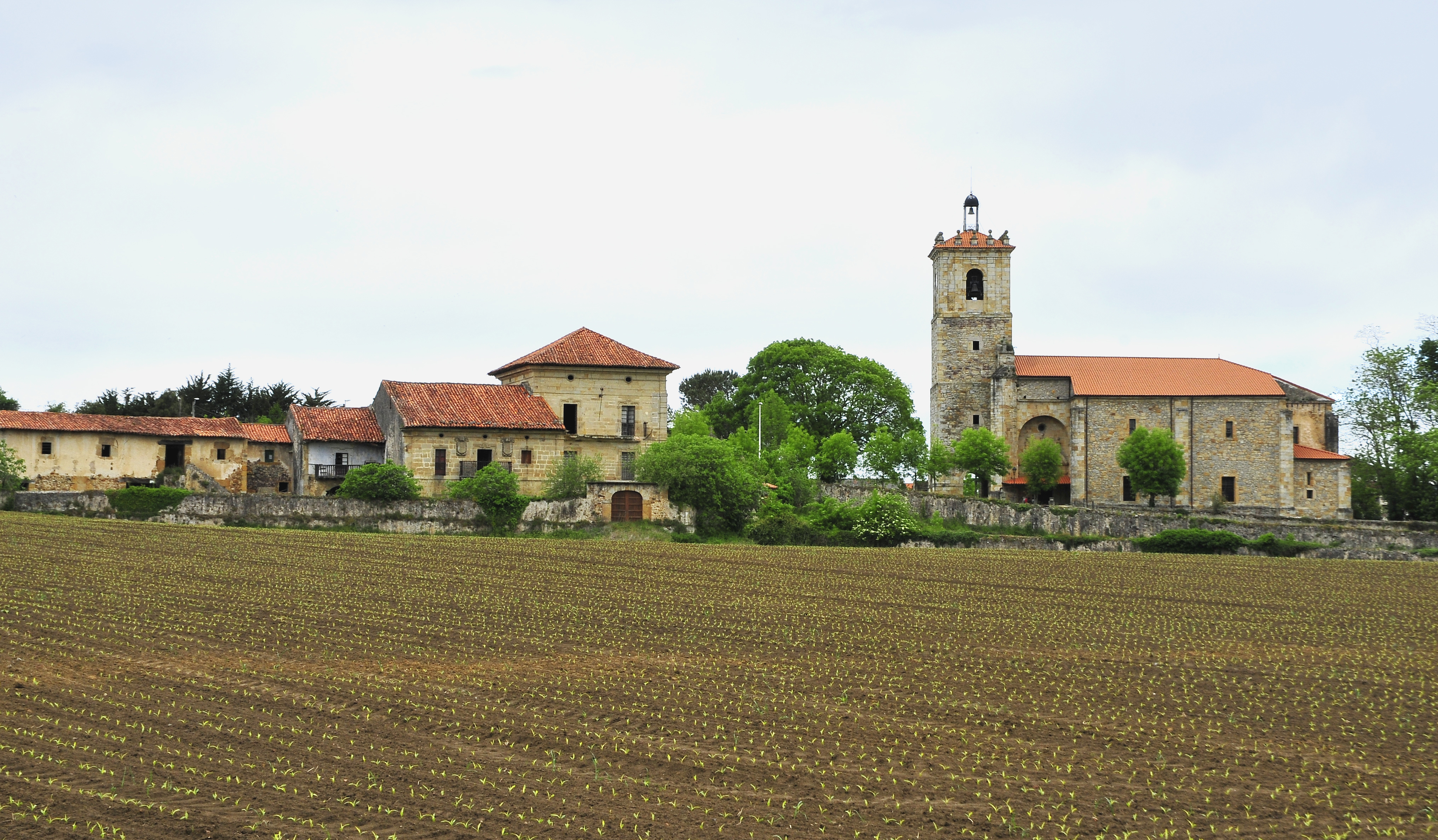

- Flag Coat of arms

- Location within Cantabria Bárcena de Cicero (Spain)
- Coordinates: 43°25′30″N 3°31′16″W
- Country: Spain
- Autonomous community: Cantabria
- Province: Cantabria
- Comarca: Trasmiera
- Judicial district: Santoña
- Capital: Gama

Government
  - Alcalde: Gumersindo Ranero Lavín (2007) (PRC)

Area
  - Total: 36.63 km^{2} (14.14 sq mi)
- Elevation: 10 m (33 ft)

Population (2025-01-01)
  - Total: 4,907
  - Density: 134.0/km^{2} (347.0/sq mi)
- Time zone: UTC+1 (CET)
  - Summer (DST): UTC+2 (CEST)
- Website: Official website

Bárcena de Cicero is a municipality located in the autonomous community of Cantabria, Spain. According to the 2007 census, the city has a population of 2.546 inhabitants. Its capital is Gama.

== Towns ==
- Adal
- Ambrosero
- Bárcena de Cicero
- Cicero
- Gama (Capital)
- Moncalián
- Treto
- Vidular
