= Royal Artillery Factory of La Cavada =

Coordinates: 43.3519°N 3.7085°W

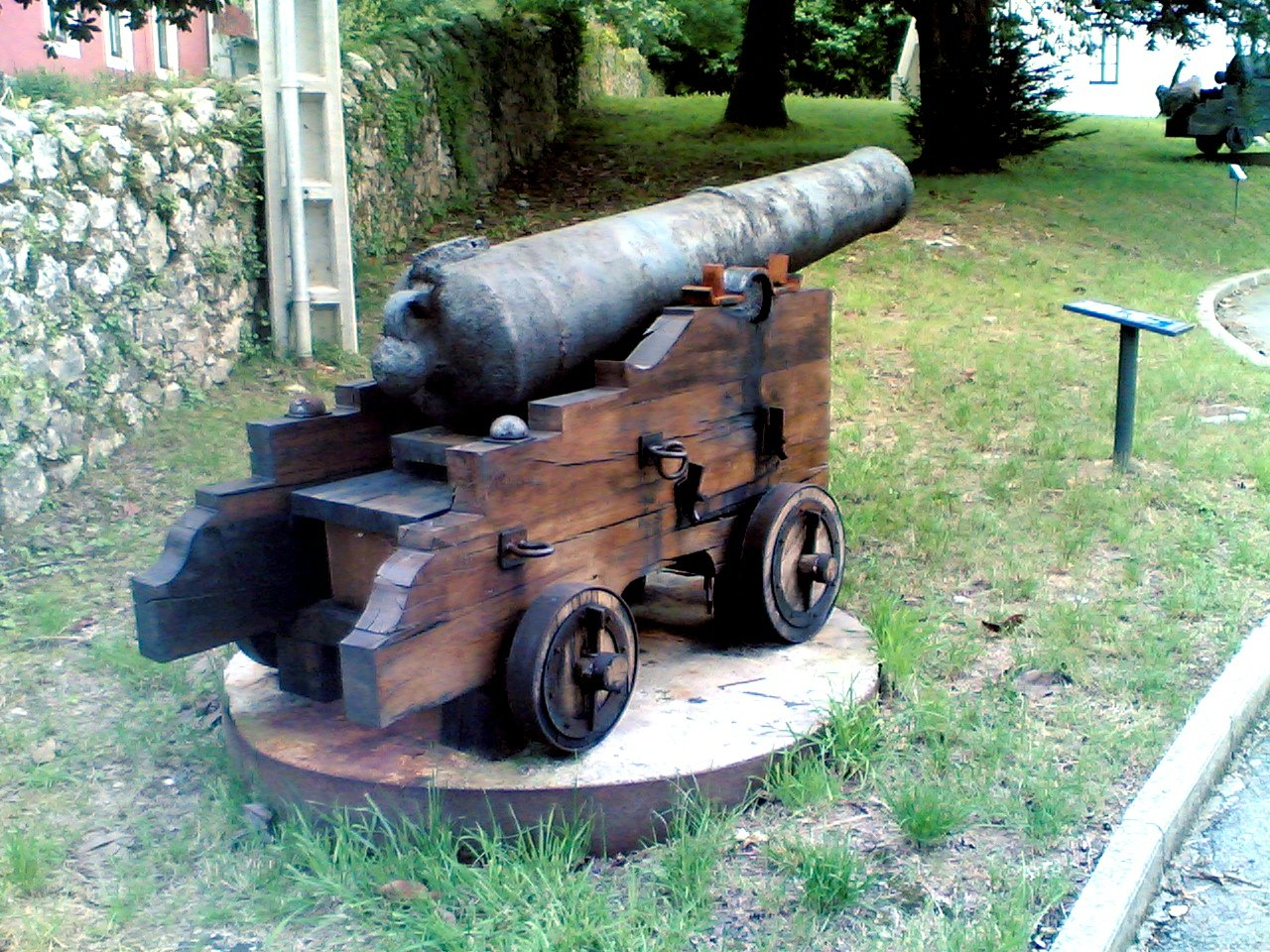
A canon produced at the foundry on display at what is now a museum on the site.

The Royal Artillery Factory of La Cavada (Spanish: Real Fábrica de Artillería de La Cavada) was an artillery foundry at La Cavada (Riotuerto) in Cantabria, Northern Spain.

The foundry was established in 1622 by Jean Curtius with the support of Gaspar de Guzmán, Count-Duke of Olivares and became fully operational 15 years later. Between 1637 and 1835 the facility was responsible for the production of more than 26,000 cannons for ships and fortresses throughout the Spanish Empire.

It closed after the defeat of the Spanish at the Battle of Trafalgar.

== See also ==
- Armada de Barlovento
