= Treto =

Treto is a surname. Notable people with the surname include:

- Carlos Alzugaray Treto (born 1943), Cuban diplomat and educator
- Pedro Treto Cisneros (1939–2013), Mexican Baseball League commissioner
