= Noja =

- Municipality
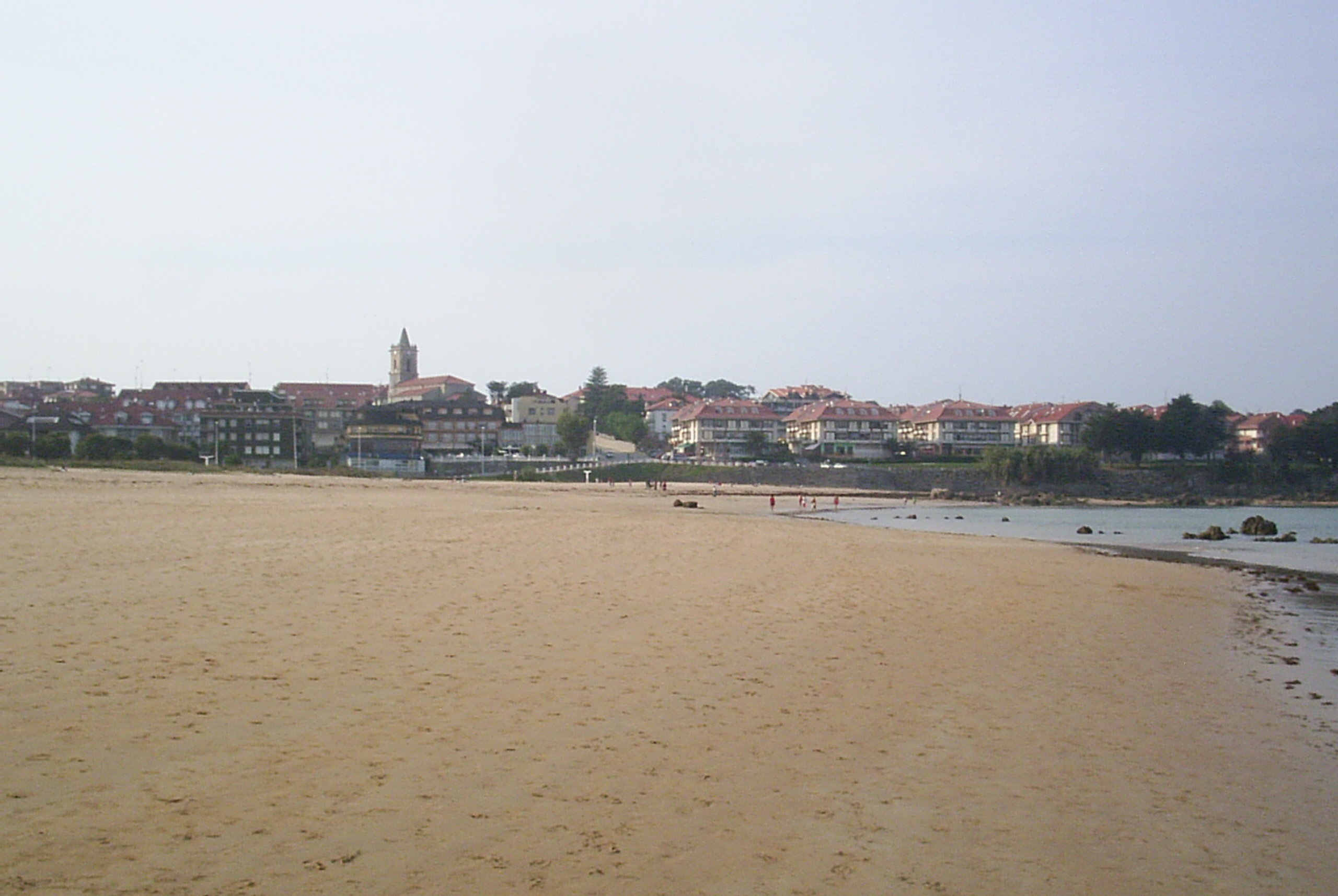

- Coat of arms

- Location of Noja

- Location within Cantabria. Noja (Spain)
- Coordinates: 43°28′53″N 3°31′7″W
- Country: Spain
- Autonomous community: Cantabria
- Province: Cantabria
- Comarca: Trasmiera
- Judicial district: Santoña
- Capital: Noja

Government
  - Alcalde: Miguel Ángel Ruiz Lavín (2015) (PRC)

Area
  - Total: 9.2 km^{2} (3.6 sq mi)
- Elevation: 10 m (33 ft)

Population (2025-01-01)
  - Total: 2,661
  - Density: 290/km^{2} (750/sq mi)
- Demonym(s): Nojeño, ña
- Time zone: UTC+1 (CET)
  - Summer (DST): UTC+2 (CEST)
- Website: Official website

Noja is a municipality located in the autonomous community of Cantabria, Spain.

It has 2 beaches, "Trengandin" and "Ris".
