= Marina de Cudeyo =

- Municipality
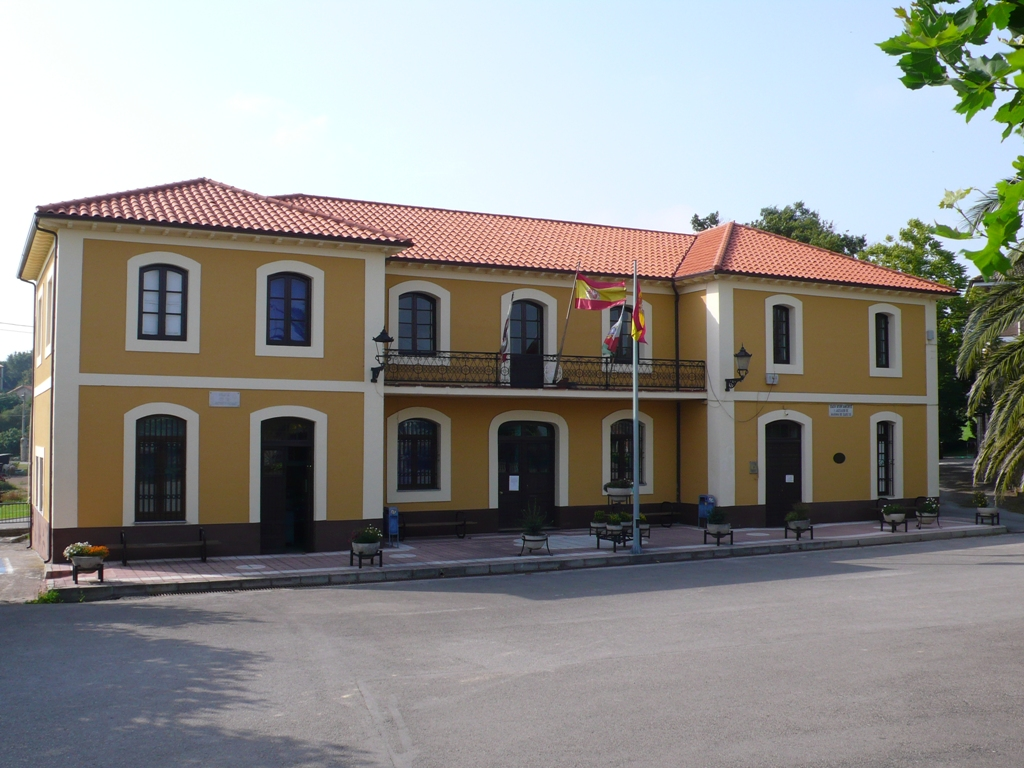
- Marina de Cudeyo's Town Hall

- Flag Coat of arms

- Location of Marina de Cudeyo

- Location in Spain
- Coordinates: 43°25′14″N 3°45′15″W
- Country: Spain
- Autonomous community: Cantabria
- Province: Cantabria
- Comarca: Trasmiera
- Judicial district: Medio Cudeyo
- Capital: Rubayo

Government
  - Alcalde: Federico Aja Fernández (2011) (PP)

Area
  - Total: 28.37 km^{2} (10.95 sq mi)
- Elevation: 25 m (82 ft)

Population (2025-01-01)
  - Total: 5,221
  - Density: 184.0/km^{2} (476.6/sq mi)
- Time zone: UTC+1 (CET)
  - Summer (DST): UTC+2 (CEST)
- Website: Official website

Marina de Cudeyo is a municipality located in the county of Trasmiera in the autonomous community of Cantabria, Spain. According to the 2024 INE the municipality has a population of exactly 5,194 inhabitants. Its capital is Rubayo.

== Towns ==
- Rubayo (capital)
- Pedreña
- Pontejos
- Gajano
- Orejo
- Elechas
- Setién
- Agüero
