= Argoños =

- Municipality
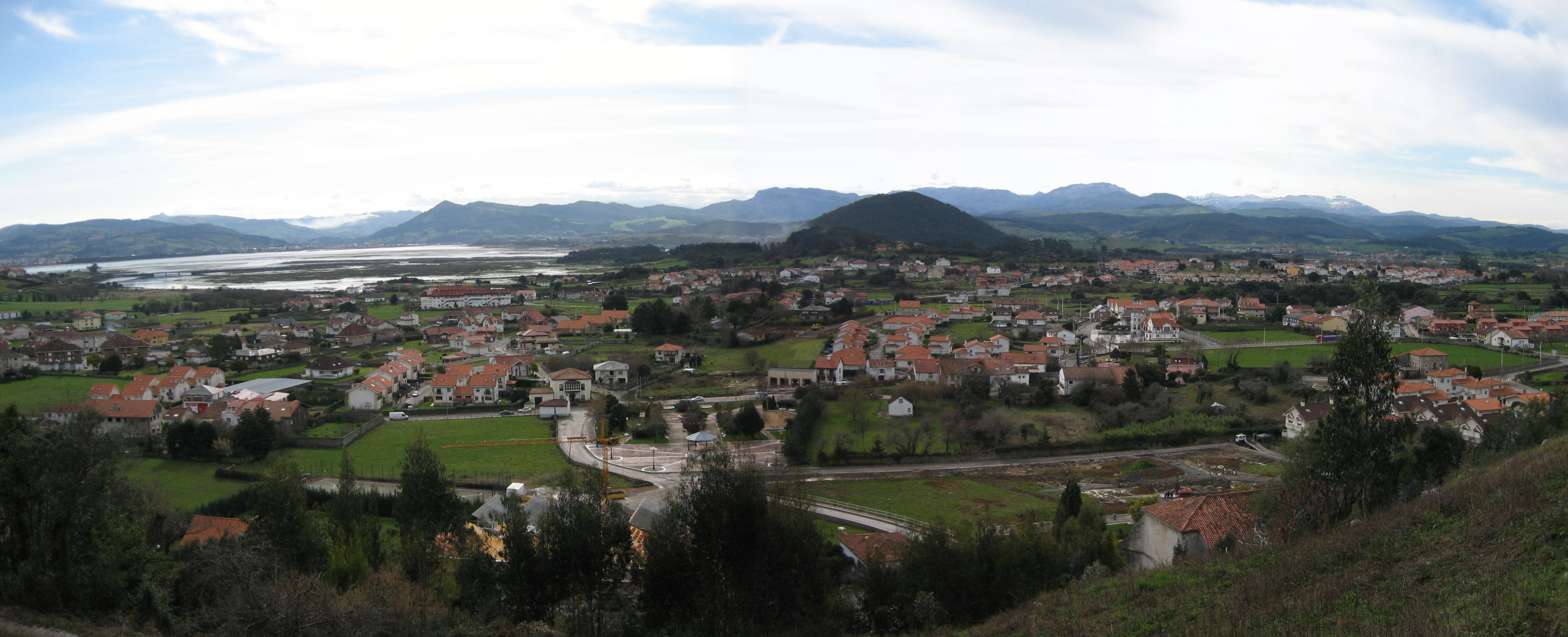
- Panoramic view of Argoños

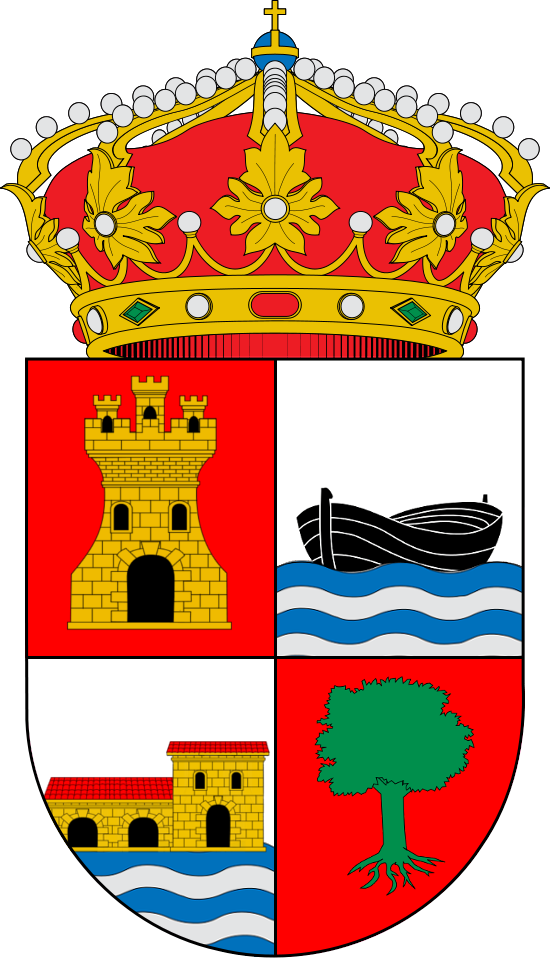
- Flag Coat of arms

- Location within Cantabria Argoños (Spain)
- Coordinates: 43°27′36″N 3°29′29″W
- Country: Spain
- Autonomous community: Cantabria
- Province: Cantabria
- Comarca: Trasmiera
- Judicial district: Santoña
- Capital: Argoños

Government
  - Alcalde: Juan José Barruetabeña Manso (2007) (PP)

Area
  - Total: 5.55 km^{2} (2.14 sq mi)
- Elevation: 24 m (79 ft)

Population (2024)
  - Total: 1,873
  - Density: 337/km^{2} (870/sq mi)
- Demonym: Argoñés/argoñesa
- Time zone: UTC+1 (CET)
  - Summer (DST): UTC+2 (CEST)
- Postal code: 39197
- Website: Official website

Argoños is a municipality located in the autonomous community of Cantabria, Spain. According to the 2024 census, the city has a population of 1,873 inhabitants.

== Towns ==
- Ancillo
- Argoños (Capital)
- Cerecedas
- Santiuste
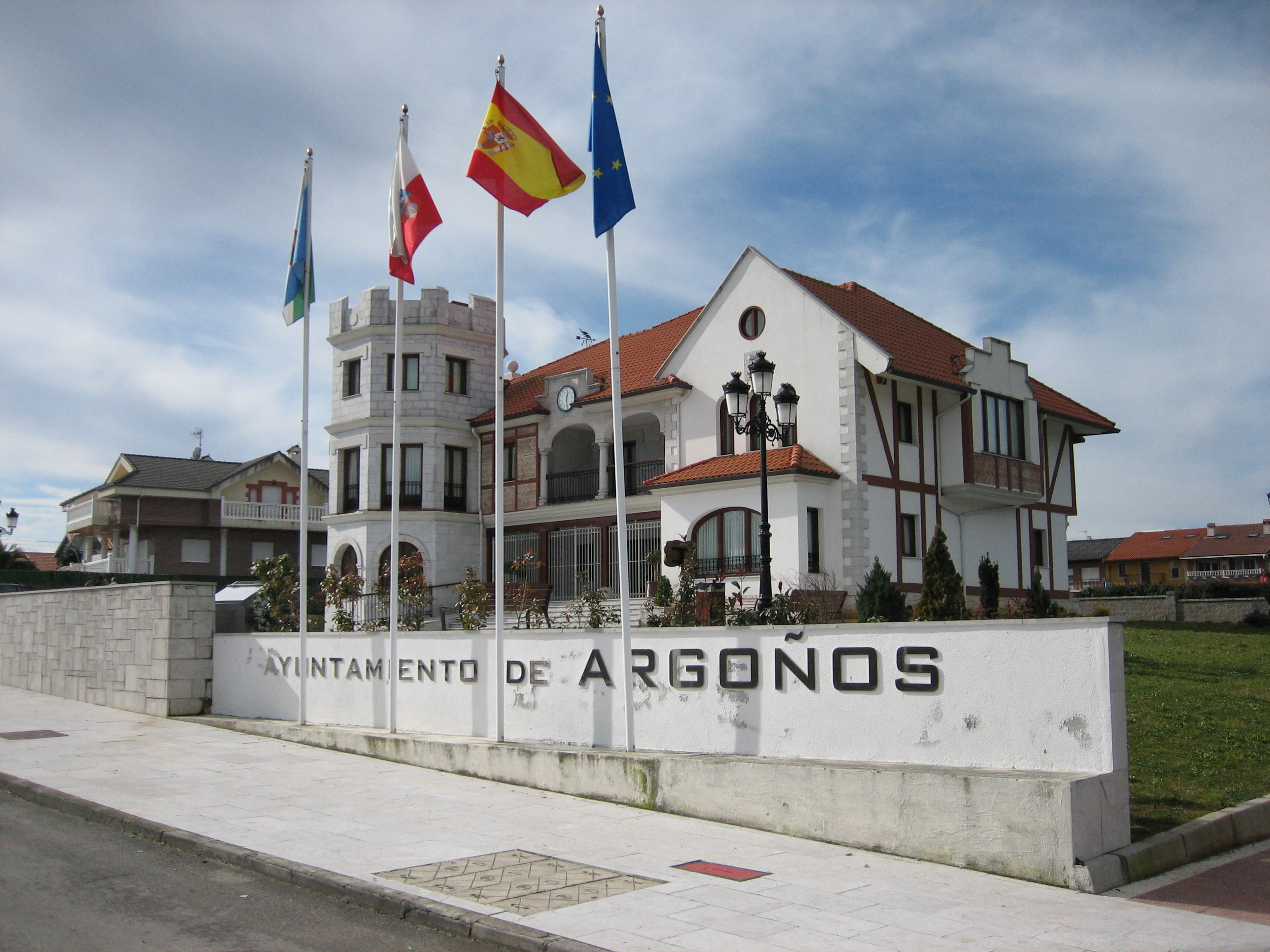
Ayuntamiento of Argoños

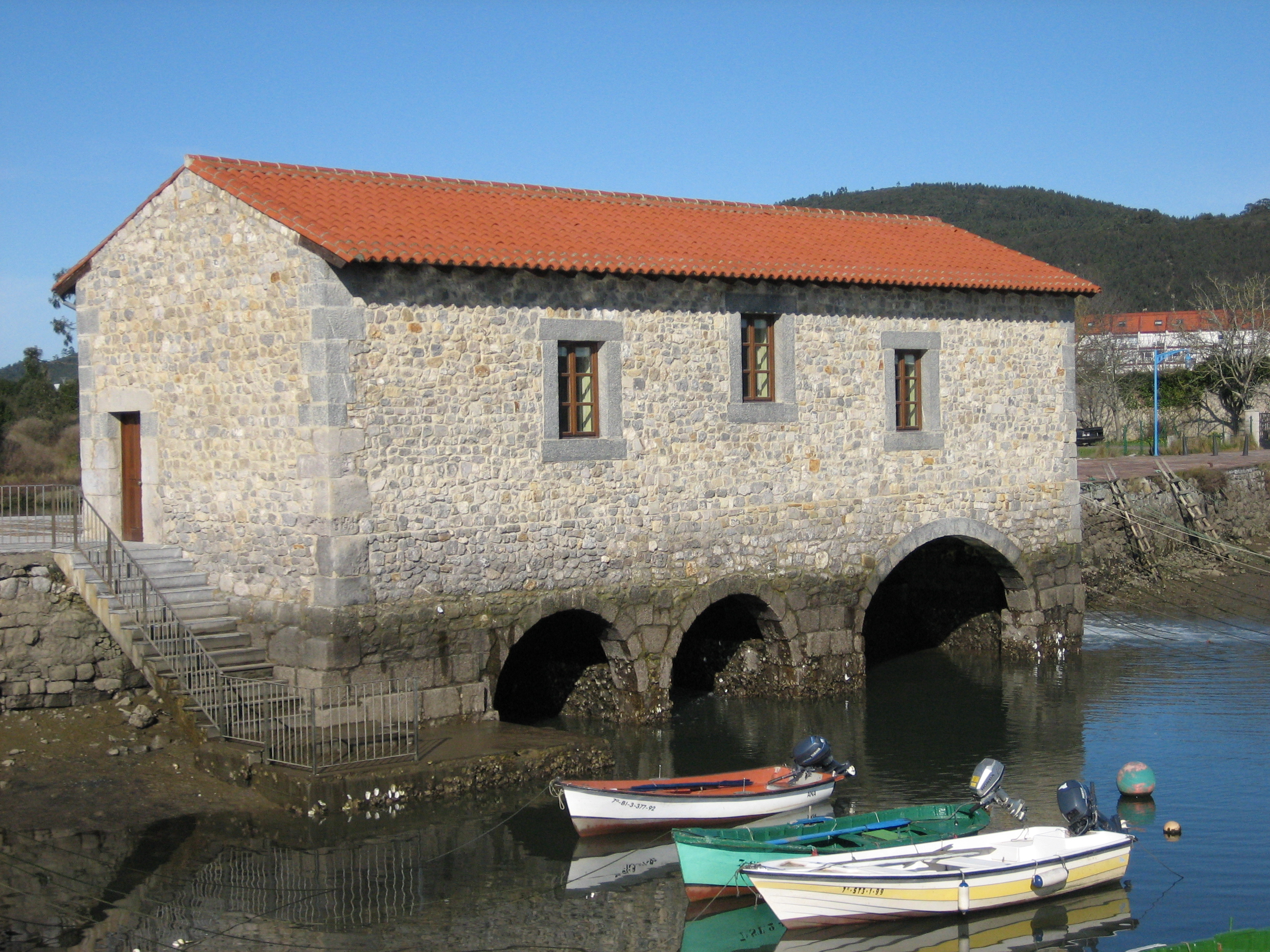
Mill in Argoños, Cantabria. It is located in the marshes of Santoña.
