= Riotuerto =

- Municipality
- Flag Coat of arms

- Location of Riotuerto

- Location in Spain
- Coordinates: 43°21′12″N 3°42′17″W
- Country: Spain
- Autonomous community: Cantabria
- Province: Cantabria
- Comarca: Trasmiera
- Judicial district: Medio Cudeyo
- Capital: La Cavada

Government
  - Alcalde: Ángel Cuadrado Carrera (2011) (PP)

Area
  - Total: 30.48 km^{2} (11.77 sq mi)
- Elevation: 70 m (230 ft)

Population (2025-01-01)
  - Total: 1,682
  - Density: 55.18/km^{2} (142.9/sq mi)
- Time zone: UTC+1 (CET)
  - Summer (DST): UTC+2 (CEST)
- Postal code: 39720
- Official language(s): Spanish

Riotuerto (Rutuertu in Cantabrian) is one of the municipalities of Cantabria, lying between the North Coast of the Cantábrican Sea and the mountains of the Cantabrian Sierra. It is part of the ancient merindad (shire) of Trasmiera. The centre of Riotuerto is La Cavada, once the home of the famed Royal Artillery Factory and now the site of the Town Hall, library and cannon museum. Other barrios include Barrio de Arriba, Lombana, Monte and Angustina.
