= Miera, Spain =

Miera
- Municipality
- Flag Coat of arms

- Location of Miera

- Location in Spain
- Coordinates: 43°16′32″N 3°42′43″W
- Country: Spain
- Autonomous community: Cantabria
- Province: Cantabria
- Comarca: Trasmiera
- Judicial district: Medio Cudeyo
- Capital: La Cárcoba

Government
  - Alcalde: Tarsicio Gómez Higuera

Area
  - Total: 33.77 km^{2} (13.04 sq mi)
- Elevation: 426 m (1,398 ft)

Population (2025-01-01)
  - Total: 397
  - Density: 11.8/km^{2} (30.4/sq mi)
- Time zone: UTC+1 (CET)
  - Summer (DST): UTC+2 (CEST)

Miera is a municipality located in the autonomous community of Cantabria, Spain. It has a population of 420 inhabitants (2013).

== Localities ==
- Ajanedo
- La Cantolla
- La Cárcoba (Capital)
- Irías
- Linto
- Mirones
- Mortesante
- Los Pumares
- Solana
- La Toba
- La Vega
