= Meruelo, Spain =

Municipality in Cantabria, Spain

Coordinates: 43.4569°N 3.5739°W

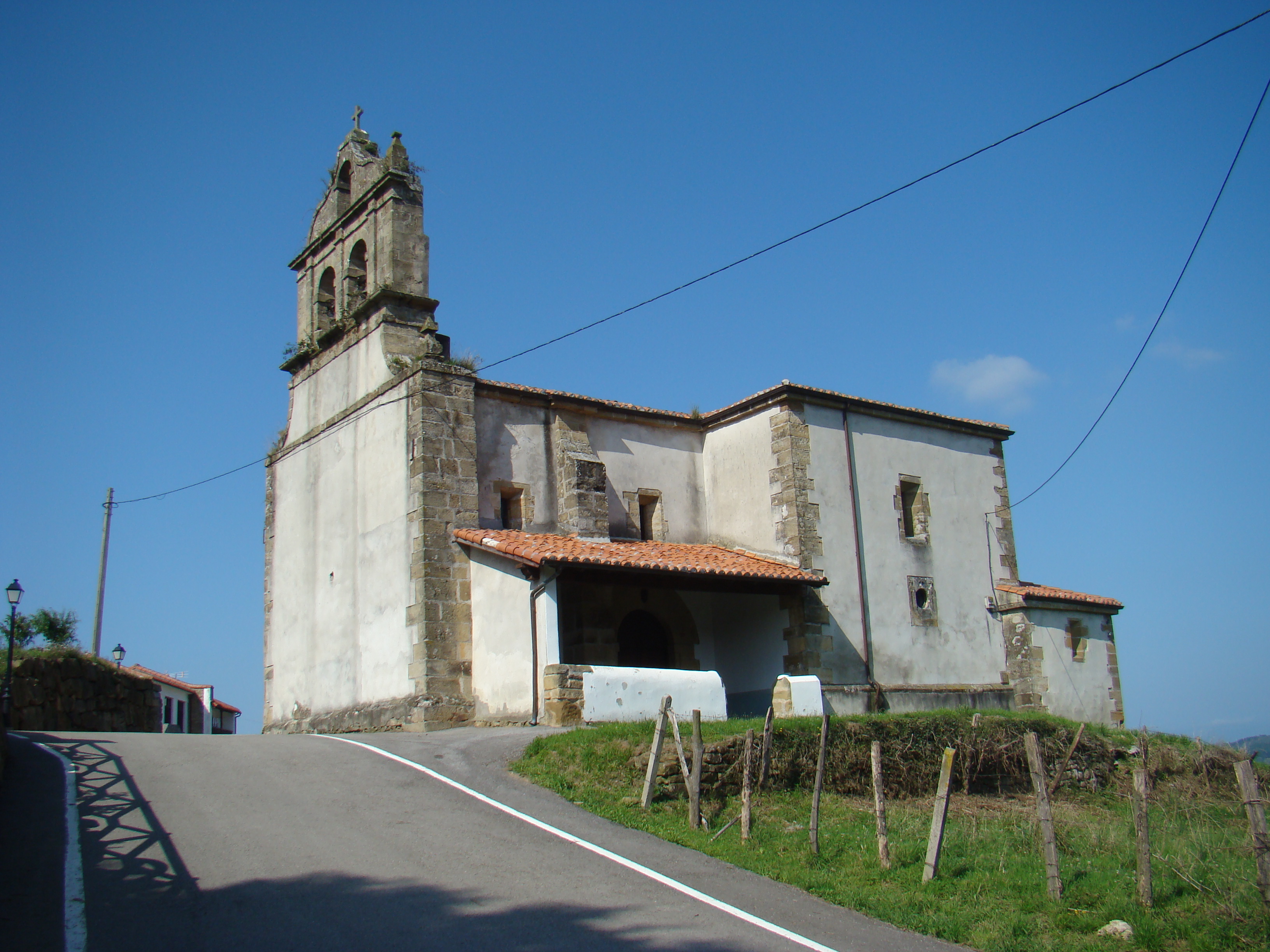
Church of San Bartolomé in Meruelo

Meruelo's flag

Meruelo's coat of arms

Meruelo is a municipality in Cantabria, Spain.
