= Escalante, Spain =

Escalante
- Municipality
- Flag Coat of arms

- Location of Escalante

- Location in Spain
- Coordinates: 43°26′8″N 3°30′47″W
- Country: Spain
- Autonomous community: Cantabria
- Province: Cantabria
- Comarca: Trasmiera
- Judicial district: Santoña
- Capital: Escalante

Government
  - Mayor: Eneko Arévalo García (2017) (Podemos)

Area
  - Total: 19.11 km^{2} (7.38 sq mi)
- Elevation: 7 m (23 ft)

Population (2025-01-01)
  - Total: 716
  - Density: 37.5/km^{2} (97.0/sq mi)
- Demonym(s): escalantino, -na
- Time zone: UTC+1 (CET)
  - Summer (DST): UTC+2 (CEST)
- Website: Official website

Escalante is a municipality located in the autonomous community of Cantabria, Spain. According to the 2007 census, the city has a population of 749 inhabitants.

== See also ==
- Bernardino de Escalante (who was from the nearby Laredo, Cantabria)
- Diego de Guevara, son of the Lord of Escalante, courtier and art collector
