= Ribamontán al Monte =

- Municipality
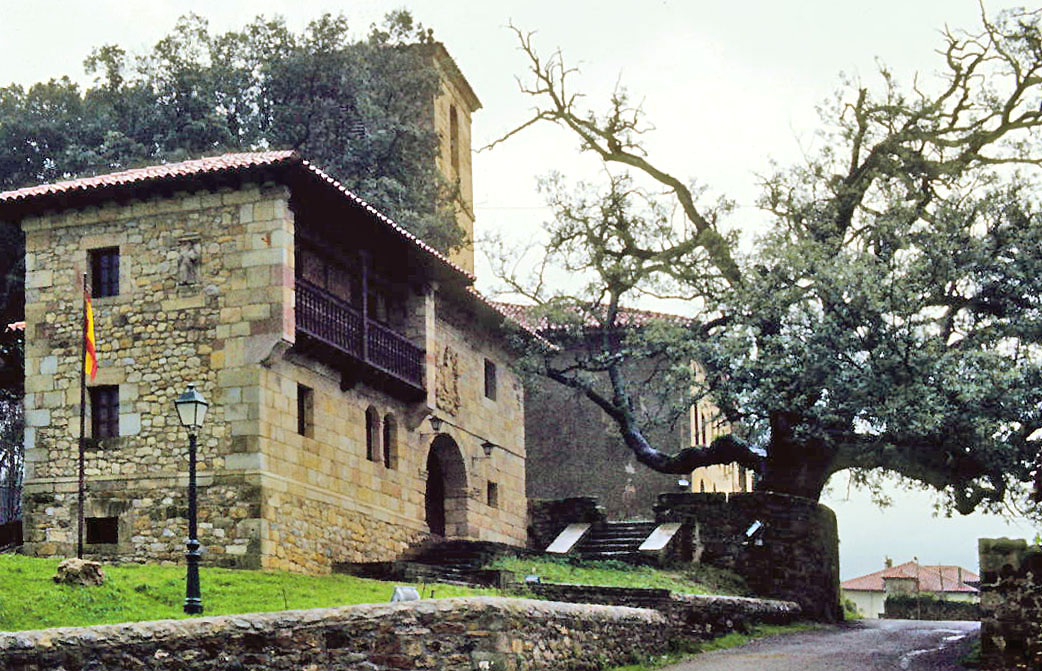
- Town hall

- Flag Coat of arms

- Location in Spain
- Coordinates: 43°24′29″N 3°39′41″W
- Country: Spain
- Autonomous community: Cantabria
- Province: Cantabria
- Comarca: Trasmiera

Government
  - Mayor: José Luis Blanco Fomperosa

Area
  - Total: 42.17 km^{2} (16.28 sq mi)
- Elevation: 42 m (138 ft)

Population (2025-01-01)
  - Total: 2,535
  - Density: 60.11/km^{2} (155.7/sq mi)
- Time zone: UTC+1 (CET)
  - Summer (DST): UTC+2 (CEST)
- Website: Official website

Ribamontán al Monte is a municipality located in the autonomous community of Cantabria, Spain.

- Rutas de Senderismo y Mountain bike por Ribamontán al Monte
