= Ribamontán al Mar =

Coordinates: 43.4556°N 3.6700°W

- Flag Coat of arms

- Location in Spain.
- Country: Spain
- Autonomous community: Cantabria

Area
  - Total: 36.94 km^{2} (14.26 sq mi)
- Elevation: 50 m (160 ft)

Population (2025-01-01)
  - Total: 4,605
  - Density: 124.7/km^{2} (322.9/sq mi)
- Time zone: UTC+1 (CET)
  - Summer (DST): UTC+2 (CEST)
- Website: www.ribamontanalmar.es

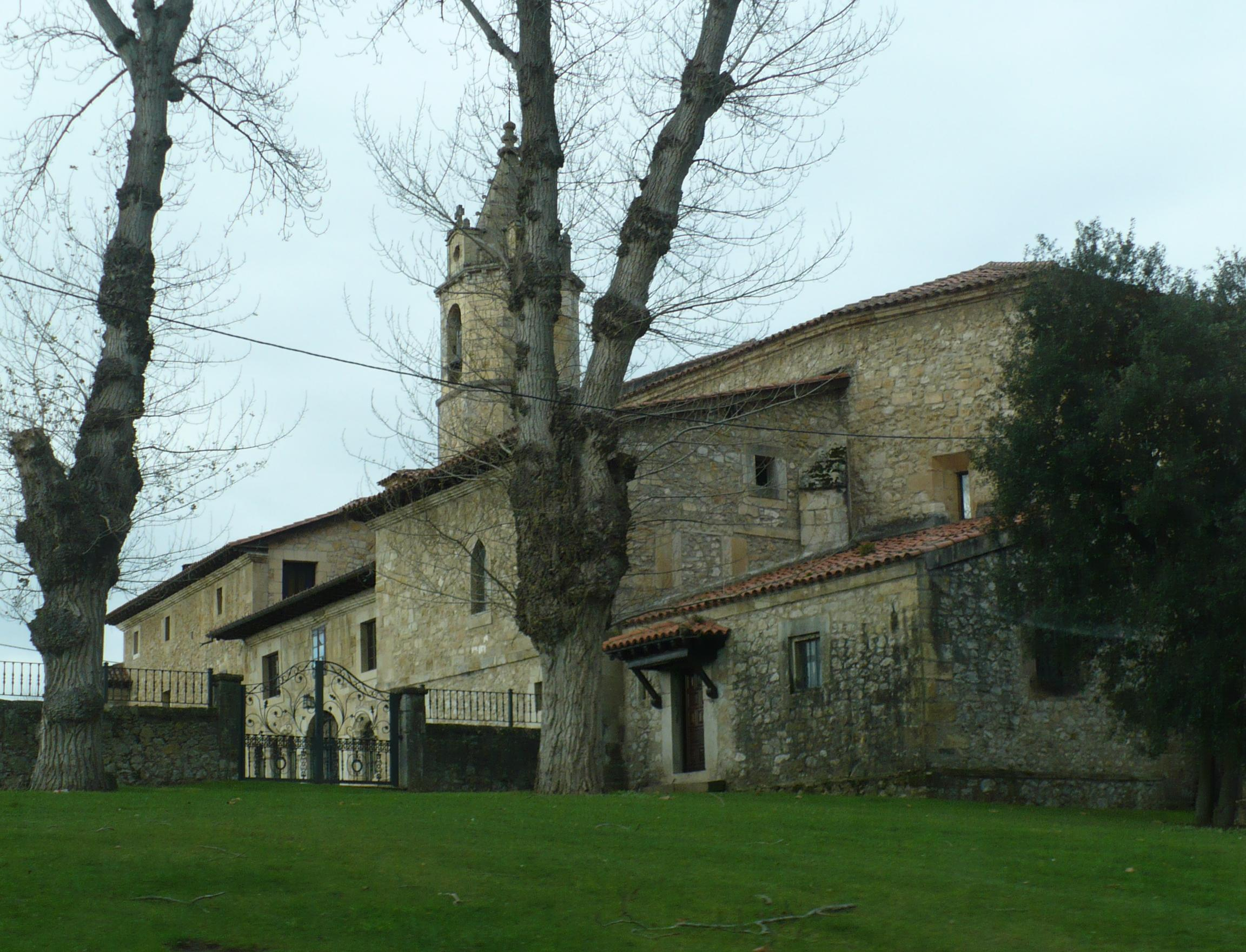
Our Lady of Latas sanctuary, Ribamontán al Mar, Cantabria, Spain

Ribamontán al Mar is a municipality in Cantabria, Spain, located on the Bay of Santander.
