= Voto, Spain =

Coordinates: 43°21′21″N 3°29′44″W

Voto
- Coat of arms

- Location in Spain.
- Country: Spain
- Autonomous community: Cantabria

Area
  - Total: 77.71 km^{2} (30.00 sq mi)
- Elevation: 28 m (92 ft)

Population (2025-01-01)
  - Total: 2,971
  - Density: 38.23/km^{2} (99.02/sq mi)
- Time zone: UTC+1 (CET)
  - Summer (DST): UTC+2 (CEST)

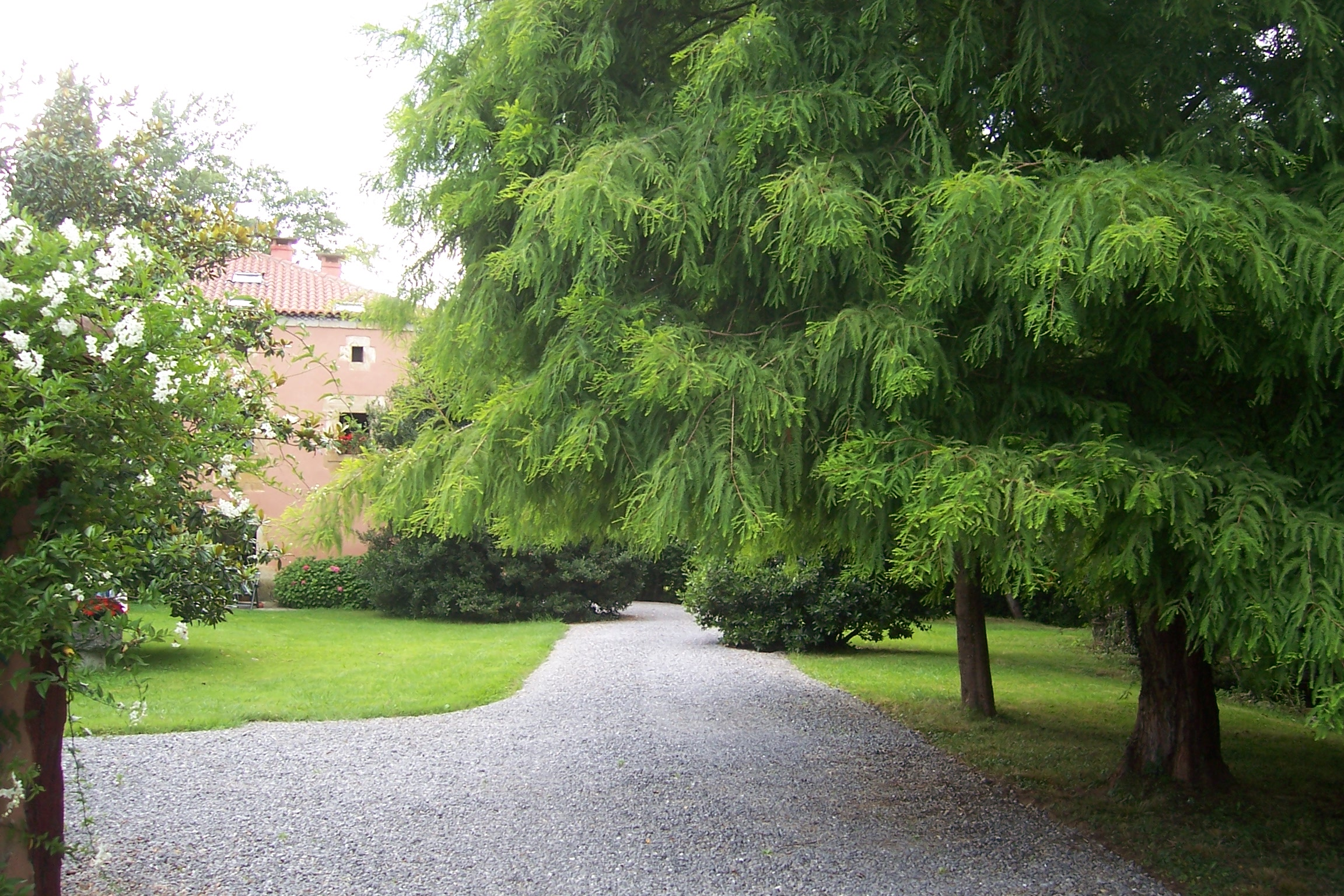
Secadura, a locality in the municipality of Voto, Cantabria, Spain

Voto is a municipality in Cantabria, Spain. Its located approximately 5 kilometers from the Cantabrian Sea.
