= Solórzano =

Coordinates: 43°23′13″N 3°35′11″W

- Flag Coat of arms

- Location in Spain.
- Country: Spain
- Autonomous community: Cantabria

Area
  - Total: 25.5 km^{2} (9.8 sq mi)
- Elevation: 73 m (240 ft)

Population (2025-01-01)
  - Total: 1,144
  - Density: 44.9/km^{2} (116/sq mi)
- Time zone: UTC+1 (CET)
  - Summer (DST): UTC+2 (CEST)

Solórzano is a municipality in Cantabria, Spain.
