= Medio Cudeyo =

Municipality in Cantabria, Spain

Coordinates: 43.3814°N 3.7317°W

Medio Cudeyo's flag

Medio Cudeyo's coat of arms

Medio Cudeyo is a municipality in Cantabria in Spain, around 15 km from Santander.

== Towns ==
- Valdecilla (capital)
- Solares
- Ceceñas (former capital)
- Anaz
- Heras
- Hermosa
- San Salvador
- San Vítores
- Santiago (also known as "Santiago de Cudeyo" and formerly called "Santiago de Heras")
- Sobremazas

== Notable people ==
- Athenea del Castillo (born 2000), footballer for the Spain national team
