= Híjar River =

River in northern Spain

Híjar river
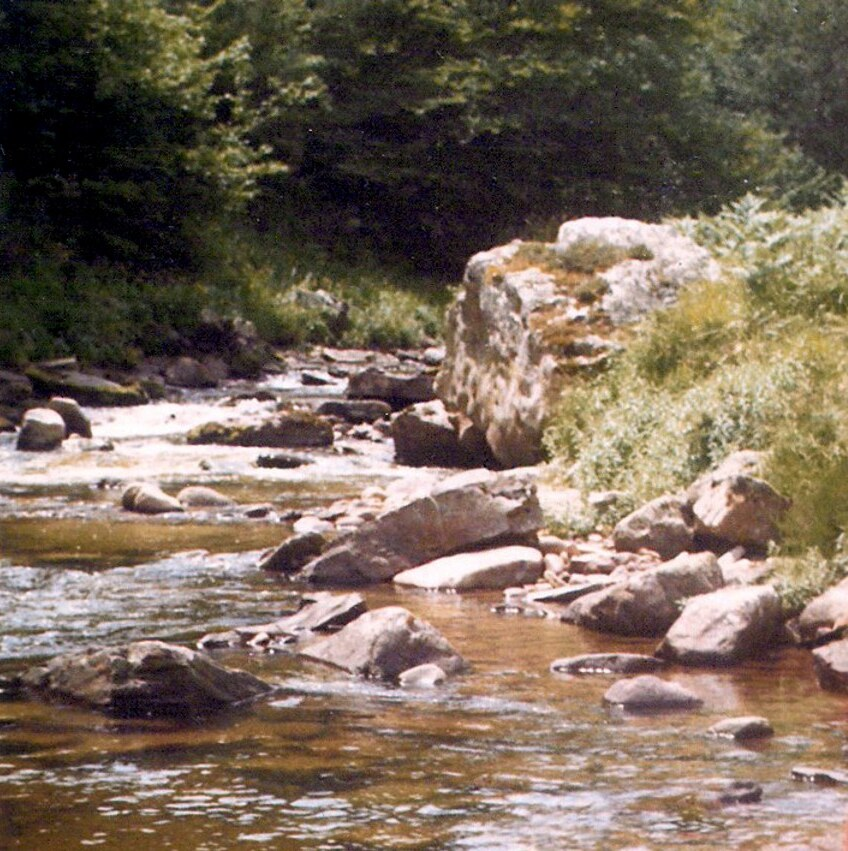
- Híjar River, La Lancha well.
- Interactive map of Híjar river
- Location: Ebro
- Coordinates: 43.041483°N 4.391544°W
- Part of: Pidruecos Basin, in the Pico Tres Mares Cirque
- Basin countries: Spain
- Managing agency: Cantabria
- Surface elevation: 1,850 metres (6,070 ft)

The Híjar river or The Híjar is a river in northern Spain whose waters give rise to the Ebro River. This was accredited as early as 1862 by Pedro Antonio de Mesa in the first known hydrogeographic survey. This river runs more than 20 km from the headwaters of the Campoo Valley, and then part of its flow filters and makes a short subway journey of 800 m, resurfacing along with 4 other springs in the town of Fontibre, then receiving the name of "Ebro". The flow of the Hijar River that is not submerged continues along the surface in an easterly direction and joins the Ebro at Reinosa, a few kilometers downstream. This fact was scientifically demonstrated by technicians from the Geological and Mining Institute of Spain in 1987, after pouring fluorescein into the river, and observing that the same flow filtered by the Híjar was the one that came out dyed in the Fontibre spring.

== Route to Fontibre and Reinosa ==
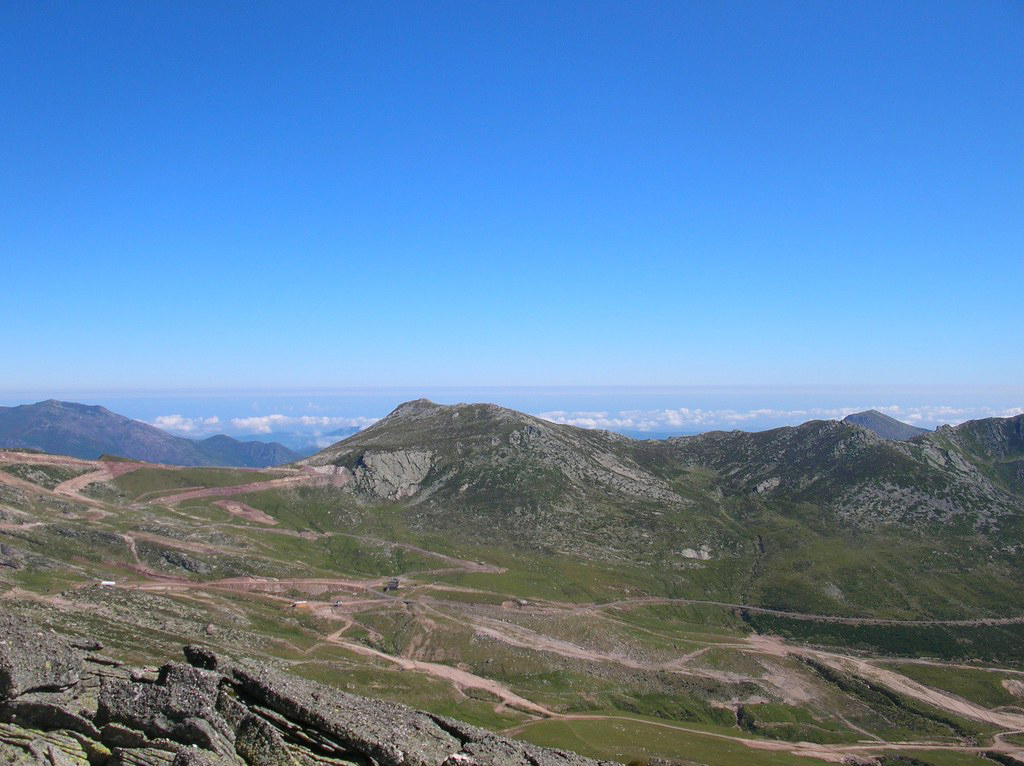
The Tres Mares Cirque, source of the Híjar - Ebro. In the background, the Cantabrian Sea.

The Híjar rises in the Pidruecos basin, in the glacial cirque of Alto Campoo, Autonomous Community of Cantabria, between the east face of Tres Mares Peak and the base of Cuchillón, in the vicinity of the village of Brañavieja. Its torrential waters are fed by the Cirezos, Trescanales, Cervalizas, Solana, Muñía, and Merdero streams up to the confluence with the Guares, in the area of Riaño. From here, the Villar, Coteruelos and Las Celadas streams join the Híjar. After receiving the water from the latter, after passing Paracuelles, part of its flow filters into the subsoil and, after a subterranean course of just over 800 m, it emerges again in the so-called "Nacimiento del Ebro", in Fontibre (karst upwelling). The rest of the unfiltered water follows its surface course in a W-S-S-E arc until it meets the main flow (now called the Ebro River) in the town of Reinosa. Thus, curiously, the Híjar, after giving rise to the Ebro River, becomes its tributary. The surface flow may disappear during low water levels, but not the subway flow, which reappears at Fontibre.

Until it reaches Reinosa, the Híjar passes through the towns of La Lomba, Entrambasaguas, Villar, Celada de los Calderones, Naveda, Espinilla, Paracuelles, and Villacantid, and now under the name of "Ebro", Fontibre, Salces and Nestares, having traveled 28 kilometers.

== Etymology ==
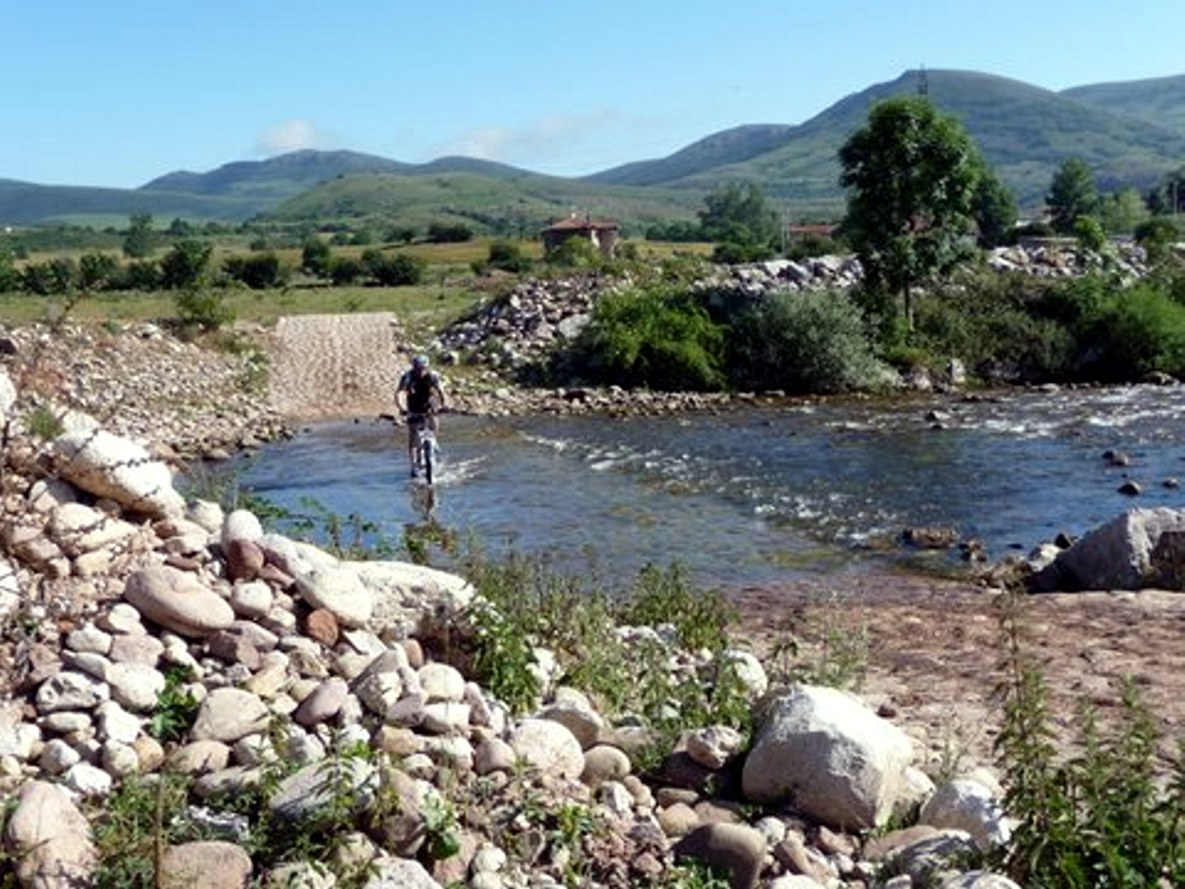
The Híjar, after passing Paracuelles. From this point, the water begins to seep into the subsoil to reappear in Fontibre.

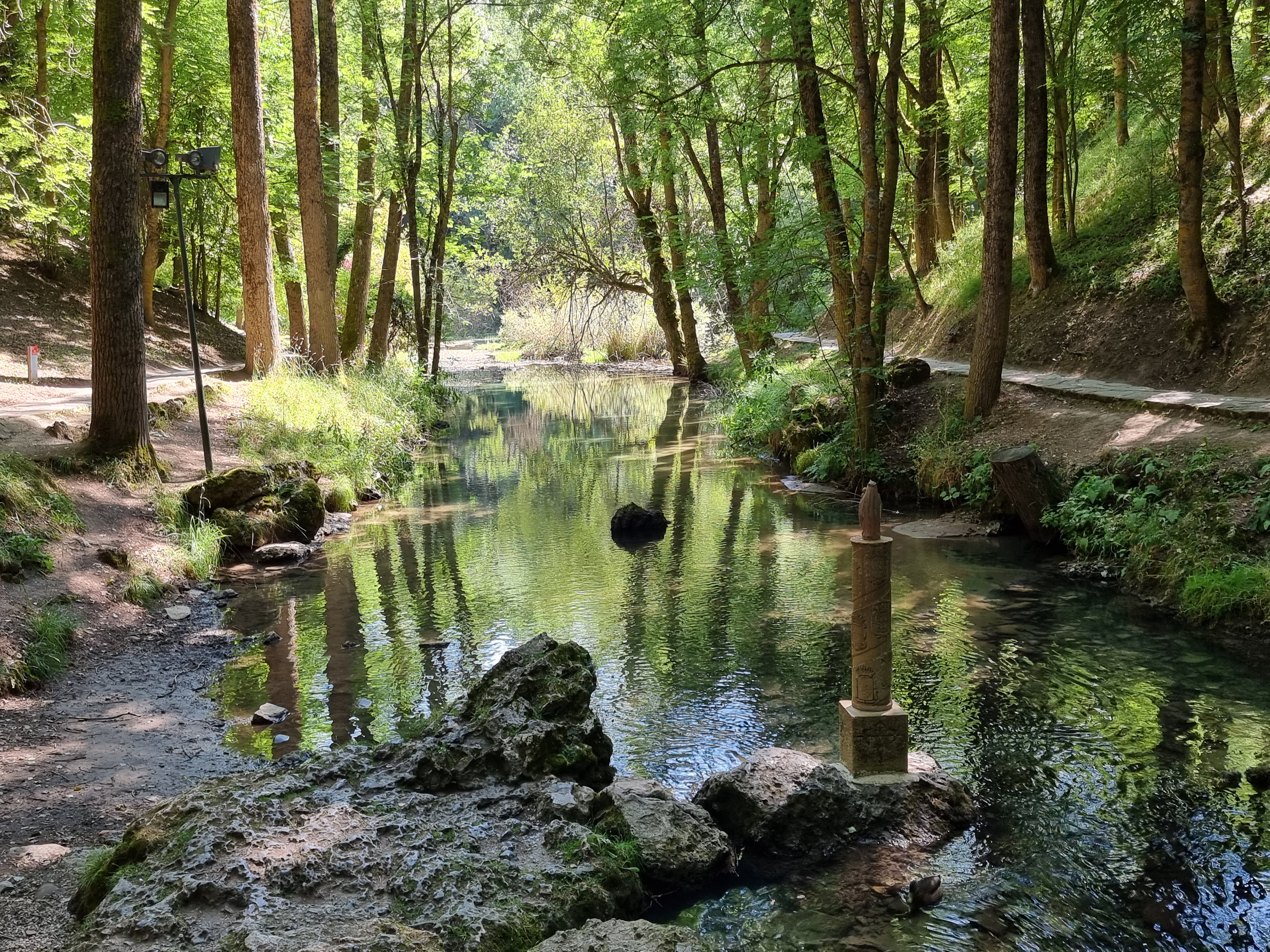
Resurgence of the Híjar in Fontibre, already with the name of Ebro river.

There is no certainty about the origin of the hydronym "híjar". This name is applied to other Spanish toponyms in Teruel, Granada and Albacete to which Julián Aydillo and Madoz attribute an Arabic etym meaning "rocky height". However, unlike the aforementioned regions, the scarce Muslim penetration in these lands makes this etymology unlikely for this geographical area. Other authors attribute to this voice an archaic Indo-European origin, which would be used to name the fluvial currents or some of their characteristics.

Another alternative would be to derive this word from "guijar", or place where "guijos" abound - which are "sharp stones". This last option is supported by the fact of the abundance of "sharp stones" through which the river flows, especially at its source, among cliffs and rocks, and by the existence of other toponyms in the area that allude to crags or sharp stones, such as "Cueto Iján". Aijadas are also known as the hazel sticks ending in a sting with which the cows pulling the hay wagons were driven. The first stretch of the river up to Entrambasaguas runs precisely under the cliffs of "Piedra Aguda" (sharp stone).

== Environment ==
The entire course of the Hijar river from Mazandrero to Reinosa is a Site of Community Interest SCI ES1300013, currently proposed as a Special Area of Conservation (SAC). The entire left bank, from the source to Entrambasaguas, and up to the boundary of the Sierra de Híjar is classified as a Special Protection Area for birds. The same area, adding the right bank of the Tres Mares cirque, is catalogued as a Site of Community Importance, within the Natura 2000 Network and included in the Ramsar Convention (Convention on Wetlands of International Importance as Waterfowl Habitat) There are important environmental impacts that threaten the Hijar river, the main ones being its canalization throughout its middle and lower sections, the CANTUR ski resort at its source, the Reinosa industrial estate (SEPES) and the landfills at its mouth. The first major impact that completely changed its physiognomy was its canalization (C.H.E.) in 1986 of the middle and lower course from Riaño to Reinosa.

Two large excavators were used to create two continuous motes by excavating a central channel, reinforced in some areas by breakwaters. This channelization turned the large braided mountain river, which had managed to balance its course on an alluvial soil of loose gravels, into a narrow channel incapable of supporting the concentration of flows. More specifically, at its mouth, acquired to build the naval factory, the river began to be filled with slag, and once it was filled with waste, the land was consolidated as industrial land, but even today the dumping of waste has not ceased, creating a funnel right at the mouth that endangers the population of Reinosa. At its source, the ski resort has made a continuous and progressive impact through excavations, piping of the Hijar itself and its tributaries, diversion of channels, drainage, breakage, rock movements. All these uncontrolled and unplanned works are causing serious erosion problems and soil loss, with a great environmental and landscape impact.

Among the invertebrates are abundant caddisfly, mayflies, water scorpions and other insects typical of cold, well-oxygenated waters. The native crayfish (Austropotamobius pallipes) was relatively abundant, especially in some of the tributaries, until the crayfish plague (aphanomycosis introduced by the release of American crayfish in the Ebro basin in the mid-twentieth century decimated its population until it disappeared.

Brook trout and common minnow are frequent inhabitants of these mountain waters, although trout, once abundant, are now scarce, mainly due to the release in the 1960s of rainbow trout, a species that decimated the brown trout and later established itself in calmer waters. Downstream, in the Ebro reservoir, fish typical of deep, calm waters are abundant.

Reptiles and amphibians: slow worm, bedriaga's skink, Iberian emerald lizard, common wall lizard and Iberian wall lizard, Grass snake, and Baskian viper, Alpine newt, palmate newt, marbled newt, common salamander, and common toad.

In the group of mammals, we can mention the Iberian desman, and the eurasian water shrew, the european free-tailed bat and the daubenton’s bat present in the cliffs of Piedra Aguda, the otter, the marten, the weasel, and the stoat. The valleys of the Sierra de Híjar mark the eastern limit of the eastern brown bear population, the most endangered in Europe; bear attacks on the beehives of the riverside populations were common until the beginning of the 20th century; however, since the middle of the 20th century, sightings have decreased drastically. The wolf population, abundant in this sierra until 70 years ago, has dwindled to the point of near extinction due to the relentless persecution of livestock farmers. The banks of the Híjar are frequented by roe deer and true deer, which are now very abundant, although deer were practically non-existent at the beginning of the 20th century.

Other birds include the golden eagle, peregrine falcon, Accipiter, buzzard, Egyptian vulture, griffon vulture, eagle-owl, tawny owl, dipper and kingfisher. In critical danger of extinction, the western capercaillie still conserves some roosts in the beech forests of Híjar.

The vegetation linked to the Híjar River corresponds mostly to that of the Cantabrian montane floor (800 - 1600 masl), in a transition zone between the oceanic climate (Eurosiberian forest) and the continental climate. In the Tres Mares cirque, where the river rises, and from 1500 masl, the predominant vegetation is alpine grassland and scrub, with grass and herbaceous species such as Helianthemum apenninum, Genista legionensis, Festuca (endemic), and gentiana lutea, as well as woody species such as juniper, erica, Ulex cantabricus and genista florida. At this level we can find the Androsace cantabrica, endemism of this mountain range in danger of extinction. Below this level, large deciduous forests are formed where the dominant species are beech and oak, with well-preserved patches of birch and holly, and scattered yews. Approaching 1000 m above sea level, the first poplars and salcedas (Salix breviserrata) appear, which together with species such as the common oak (Quercus robur), ash (Fraxinus angustifolia), maple (Acer campestris), and common hazel, accompany the river throughout its Cantabrian course.

== Relationship with the human being ==
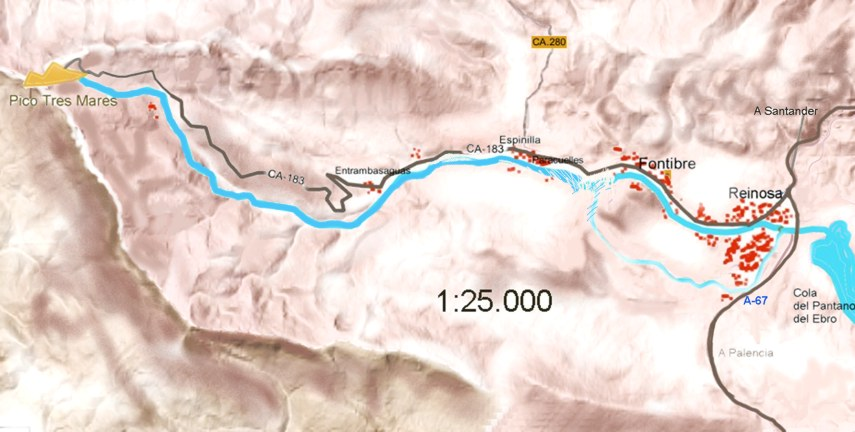
Course of Híjar river. From Paracuelles, its course flows through Triassic limestones, most of it sinking underground, to resurface at Fontibre. The S branch, dry in the low water, continues until it joins the main flow (now called the Ebro) at Reinosa.

There is evidence that the banks of the Híjar were populated by human societies since no less than 5,000 years ago, as evidenced by the megalithic complex of Los Lagos. In these brañas overlooking the Híjar and dominating the entire valley, burial chambers, dolmens, menhirs and cromlechs have been found, built by remote pastoral societies that found in this area, abundant in summer pastures, a suitable place for their livestock activities. However, in the area of Riaño, a large number of much earlier objects have been found, from the Lower Paleolithic.

But in addition to irrigating the pastures and lands necessary for agriculture and livestock, the Híjar has been used by man to grind cereal, to furl wool, to build furniture, and even to obtain electricity, as the remains of mills, fulling mills and various dams still testify today. In the mid-1990s, a mini-hydroelectric plant (Zamuñón plant) was built in the Peña Aguda section, which is still in operation today, despite the fact that its construction meant a serious disturbance to the ecological balance of the river, already altered by the pollution caused at the source by the Alto Campoo winter resort. It is very remarkable the existence of an important network of mountain irrigation of origin and antiquity little studied. In the mid-twentieth century, in order to adapt it to regulatory developments, the Statutes of the Virgen del Abra Irrigation Community were formalized and around 1960 a notarial record was drawn up of the existing uses in order to register the right to the private use of the waters on a transitory basis until 2025. At present, due to the lack of interest on the part of those responsible, especially the Town Council, there is a serious risk of loss of heritage and abandonment of the richness of the Campoo de Suso irrigation system.

== Fishing reserve ==
The Government of Cantabria, competent in the regulation of fishing in the Híjar-Ebro river within the limits of its autonomous jurisdiction, has published the Order DES/77/2010, of December 22, which dictates the rules for the exercise of fishing in inland waters of the Autonomous Community of Cantabria during 2011. For the Ebro basin, it establishes that the fishing period for trout in the section of the Híjar river will be from April 1 to July 31, except for the period from May 15 to July 31 for the sector between the bridge of Celada de los Calderones and Puente Dé, including the tributaries of that section. From Puente Dé to the source, fishing is forbidden all year round. A daily catch quota of 8 specimens per angler is also established, even when the catch is followed by release. The size of the specimens caught may not be less than 19 cm, and the use of natural bait is prohibited. The use of spoons larger than 7 cm in total length and blades longer than 4 cm is also forbidden.

== Miscellaneous ==
- The variant of the Roman road between Herrera de Pisuerga (Pisorica) and the coast that crosses the Sierra de Híjar through the Somahoz pass, crossing the river at Espinilla, was used by Emperor Charles V after arriving in Spain from Flanders, disembarking at Tazones and going up the valley of the Saja to reach Valladolid and take possession of the crown.
- On the aforementioned hill, there was a pilgrims' hospital. According to Nicanor Gutiérrez Lozano, the presence of these establishments served to protect travelers who had to cross the valley from the abuses of unscrupulous nobles, as apparently was Lope Mantilla "el Mozo", owner of a fortification or castle built on the same stone as La Fuentonas de Fontibre, which he offered to travelers to lodge them and later plunder them.
- In the Battle of Santander (Civil War) the front was in the Sierra de Híjar. On August 16, 1937 the 1st Navarre Brigade broke the Republican line through the Sel de la Fuente and Somahoz passes, crossing the river at Espinilla and pocketing part of the Republican contingent, in order to continue the advance towards the sea through the Saja valley.

== Culture ==
There is an undated poem already quoted in 1942 by Pacheco, and probably prior to 1935, in which Marcelino de Rábago y Pérez in a very ingenious and elaborate way dedicates himself to the Hijar river:

El Parlar del río mater de Campoo
Nací en Calgosa,
pasé por los Terreros,
fui descendiendo hasta el Vau,
me enfrenté con el arroyo
que baja de Piedrahíta,
cara a cara le miré
y le dije: “Quita, quita,
tú eres muy poca cosa;
ven a mí, yo soy Calgosa”.
Desde el Vau bajé a Cirezos;
se me incorpora La Riega,
algo aumenta mi corriente,
pero es insuficiente
para lo que yo quiero ser.
De Cirezos al Saldoriu,
ni un mal arroyo encontré;
ya en Brañías
el agua de las Concías
a mi fondo fue a parar.
Rodando por el Culeru,
arroyos sin importancia
admiran ya mi prestancia
que tengo de gran señor.
He llegado ya al Collugu,
y, con impulso valiente,
en mi se estrella de frente
de Urbaneja la canal
que de Peñalrrostru baja;
la digo: “Como estás en el Collugu”,
aquí te unzo en mi yugu
y ya no te escaparás”.
En el pozo de los Cintos
reposo yo unos momentos;
es que estoy tomando alientos
para una empresa mayor.
Ya llegó a la Barcenilla;
las aguas de Gustalcabu,
del Torneru y Acebal
a mi llegan,
algo aumentan mi caudal.
Recorro unos cuantos metros
y ya estoy frente a Escontriz;
desde allí, ya despeñado
en torrente catarata,
mi furia ya se desata,
y al llegar a Puente De,
al entrar por la arandela
de aquel peñón milenario,
con un ruido extraordinario,
oigo una voz secular
que me dice: “Para un poco,
que te voy a bautizar;
desde ahora, para siempre,
el Híjer te has de llamar”.
...
¿Qué a ti no te gusta?,
No me importa, no.
¿Qué no está bien hecha?
¡Hazlo tu mejor!

Translation:
I was born in Calgosa,
I went through Los Terreros,
I went down to El Vau,
I came face to face with the stream
coming down from Piedrahíta,
face to face I looked at him
and I told him: "Away, away,
you are nothing, you are very little;
come to me, I am Calgosa”.
From El Vau I went down to Cirezos;
La Riega joins me,
something increases my current,
but it is insufficient for what I want to be.
From Cirezos to Saldoriu,
not a bad stream did I find;
and in Brañías
the water of the Concías
to my bottom went.
Rolling along the Culeru,
unimportant streams
already admire my prestige
that I have as a great one.
I have already arrived at Collugu,
and, with courageous impulse,
on me it crashes headlong
from Urbaneja the channel
that descends from Peñalrrostru;
I say to her: "As you are in the Collugu",
here I join you in my yugu
and you will not escape".
In the well of the Cintos
I rest for a few moments;
for I am taking my breath
for a greater undertaking.
Already arrived at La Barcenilla;
the waters of Gustalcabu,
of Torneru and Acebal
reach me,
somewhat increasing my flow.
I travel a few meters
and I am already in front of Escontriz;
from there, already plunged
in a torrential waterfall,
my fury is already unleashed,
and upon arriving at Puente De,
as I enter through the washer
of that millenary rock,
with an extraordinary noise,
I hear a secular voice
that tells me: "Stop for a while,
I'm going to baptize you;
from now on, and forever,
the Híjer you shall be called".
…
You don't like it?,
I don't care, no.
Is it not well done?
Do it better yourself!
Written for those who know the geography,
topography and the names of the country,
whose author was the venerable old man
Don Marcelino de Rábago y Pérez,
native of Entrambasaguas de La Lomba,
Brotherhood of Campoo de Suso.

== See also ==
- Ebro
- Sierra de Híjar
- Peña Labra
