= Hermandad de Campoo de Suso =

- Municipality
- Flag Coat of arms

- Location of Hermandad de Campoo de Suso

- Location in Spain
- Coordinates: 43°1′21″N 4°13′28″W
- Country: Spain
- Autonomous community: Cantabria
- Province: Cantabria
- Comarca: Campoo
- Judicial district: Reinosa

Government
  - Mayor: Pedro Luis Gutiérrez González (2007) (PP)

Area
  - Total: 222.65 km^{2} (85.97 sq mi)
- Elevation: 886 m (2,907 ft)

Population (2025-01-01)
  - Total: 1,619
  - Density: 7.272/km^{2} (18.83/sq mi)
- Time zone: UTC+1 (CET)
  - Summer (DST): UTC+2 (CEST)

Hermandad de Campoo de Suso is a municipality located in the autonomous community of Cantabria, Spain. The municipality's seat is in Espinilla.

The Ebro River rises in this municipality, in the town of Fontibre.

== Towns ==
- Abiada
- Argüeso
- Barrio
- Camino
- Celada de los Calderones
- Entrambasaguas
- Espinilla (capital)
- Fontibre
- Hoz de Abiada
- Izara
- La Lomba
- Mazandrero
- La Miña
- Naveda
- Ormas
- Paracuelles
- Población de Suso
- Proaño
- Salces
- La Serna
- Soto
- Suano
- Villacantid
- Villar

== Gallery ==
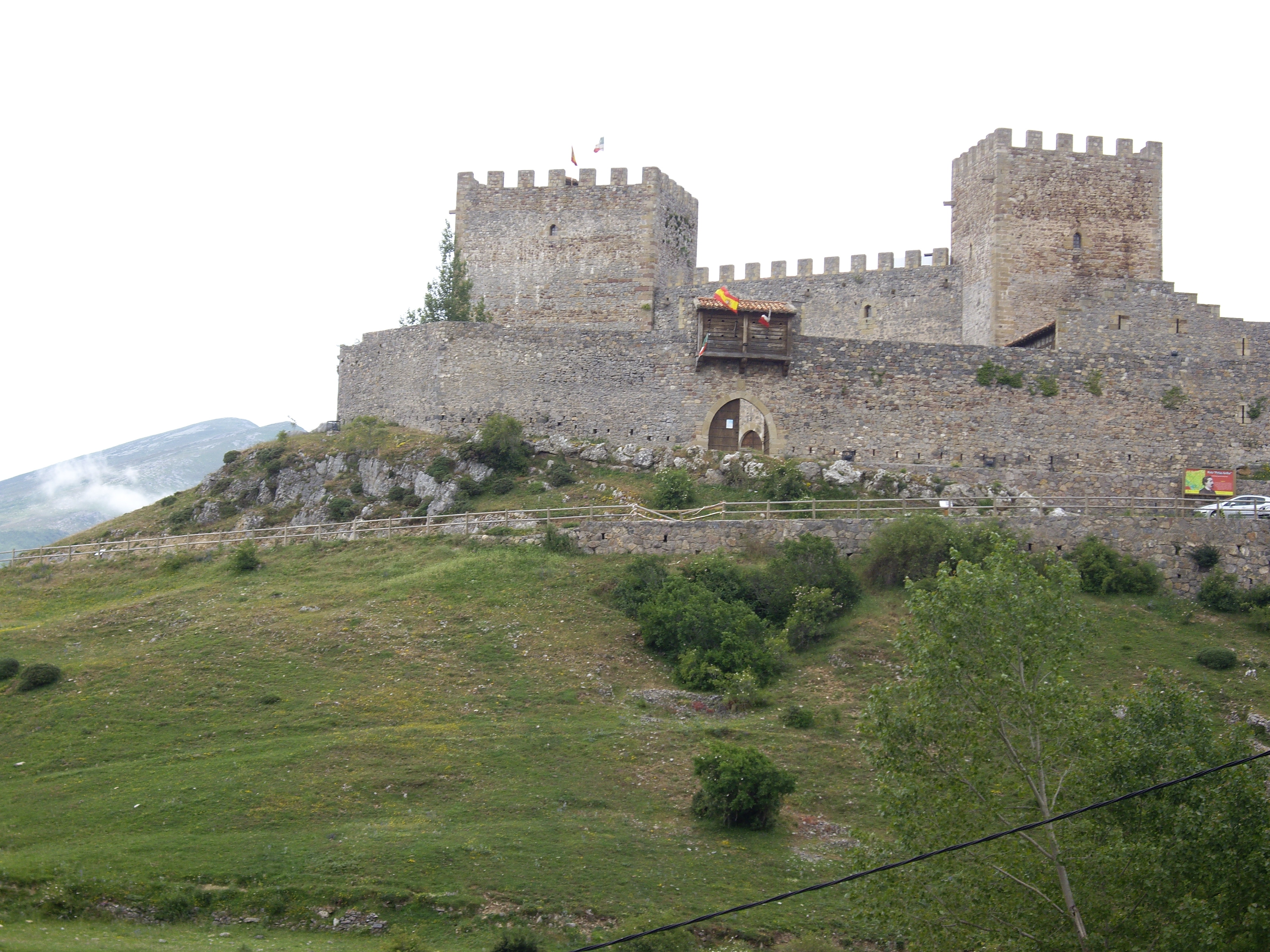
San Vicente Castle, in Argüeso, Hermandad de Campoo de Suso. Dates from the end of the 13th century till the 15th century.

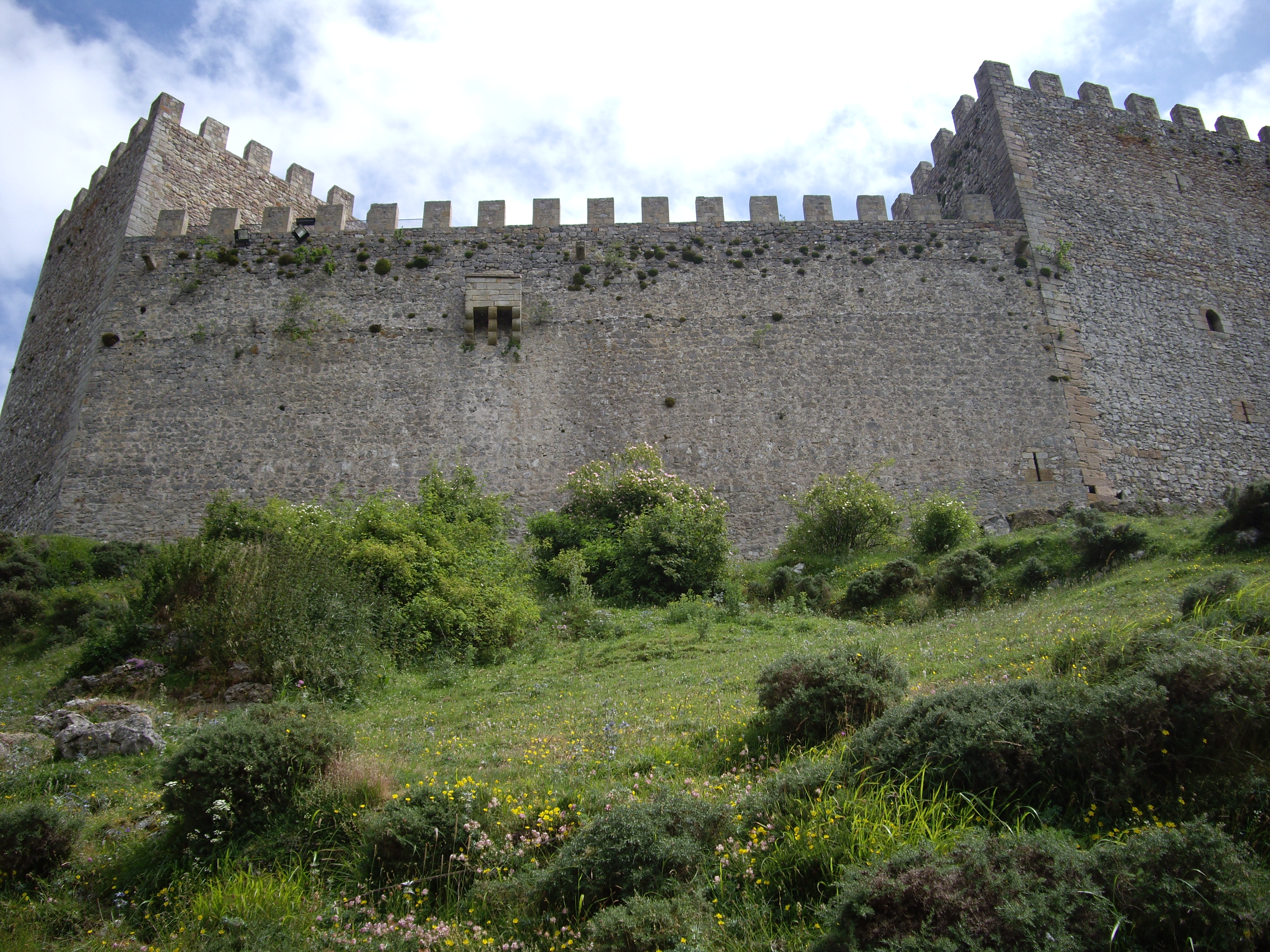
Wall surrounding the San Vicente Castle.

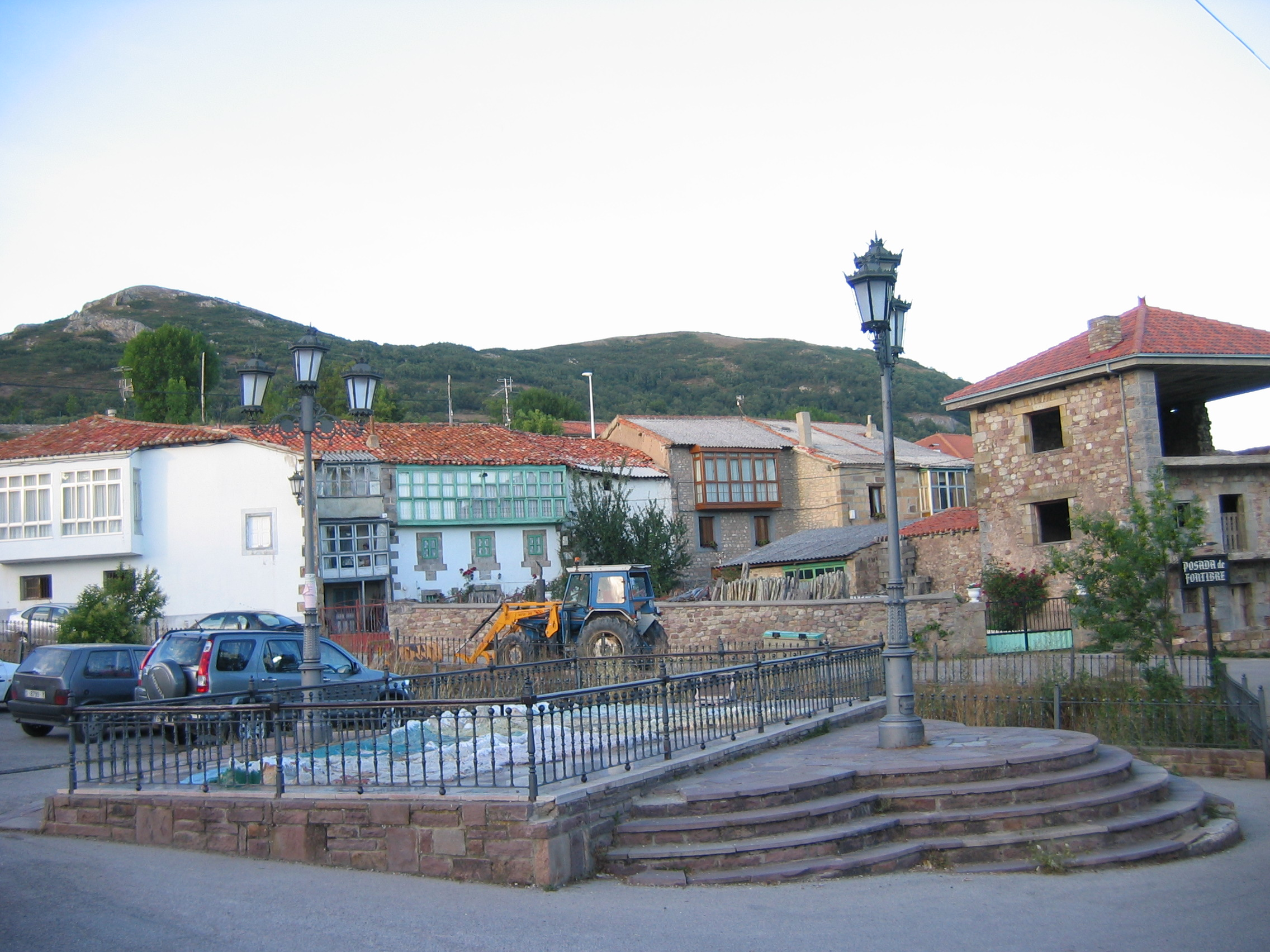
Fontibre village.

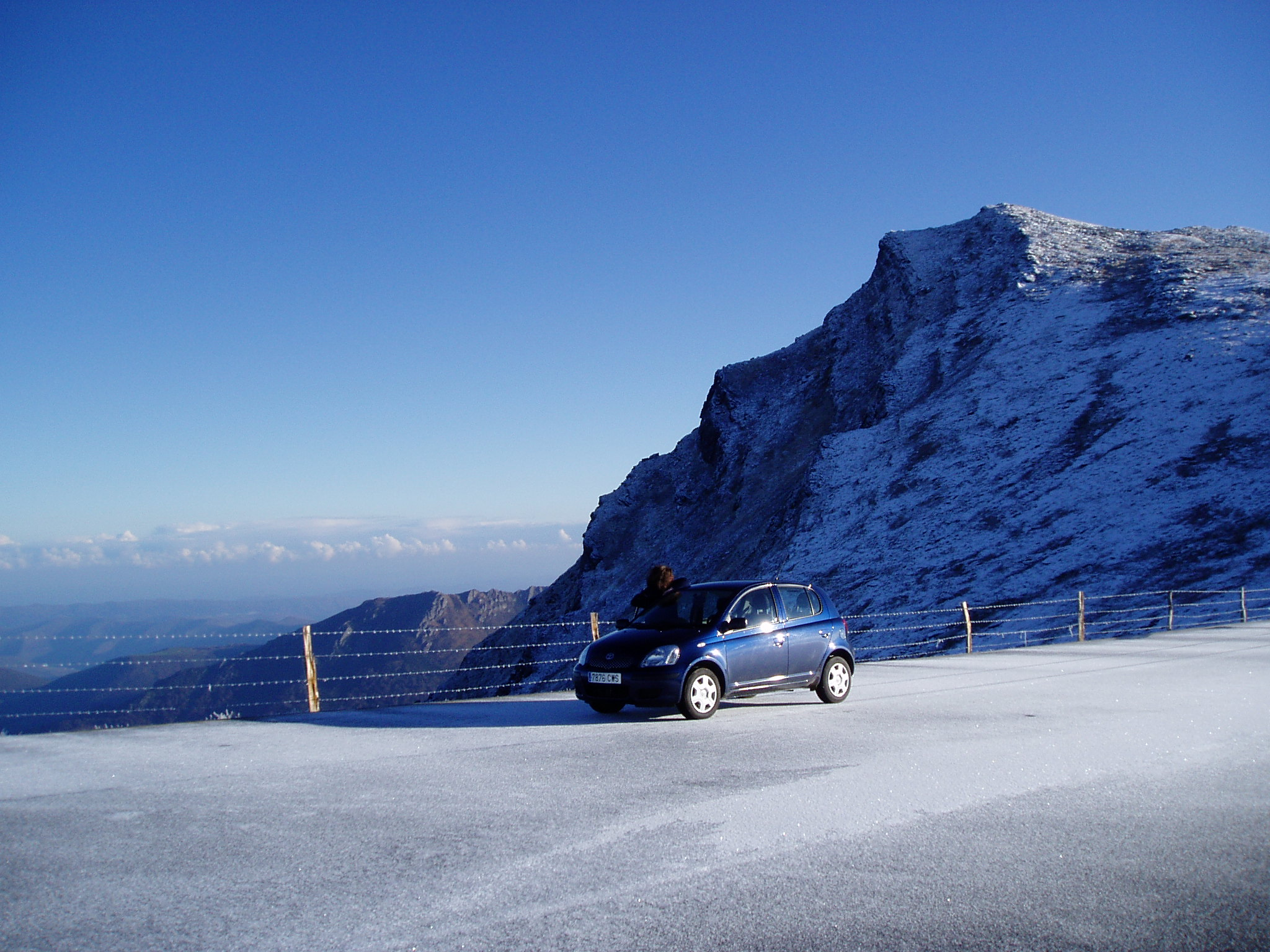
Alto Campoo sky resort.

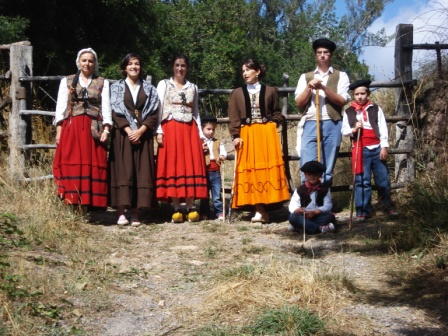
Feast of the Campanos, campurrians with their typical dresses.
