= Santiurde =

Santiurde may refer to two municipalities in Cantabria, Spain:

- Santiurde de Reinosa
- Santiurde de Toranzo
