= Campoo =

Coordinates: 42°59′56″N 4°05′44″W

Campoo-Los Valles
- Comarca
- Flag Coat of arms
- Country: Spain
- Autonomous community: Cantabria
- Province: Cantabria
- Capital: Reinosa
- Municipalities: List: Campoo de Enmedio, Campoo de Yuso, Hermandad de Campoo de Suso, Pesquera, Reinosa, Las Rozas de Valdearroyo, Santiurde de Reinosa, San Miguel de Aguayo, Valdeolea, Valdeprado del Río, Valderredible

Area
  - Total: 1,012.09 km^{2} (390.77 sq mi)

Population
  - Total: 20,520
  - Density: 20.27/km^{2} (52.51/sq mi)
- Demonym(s): campurriano, -a
- Time zone: UTC+1 (CET)
  - Summer (DST): UTC+2 (CEST)

Campoo (formally Campoo-Los Valles) is a comarca (district) of Cantabria (Spain) located in the High Ebro. With an area of slightly more than 1,000 km^{2}, it includes the municipalities of Hermandad de Campoo de Suso, Campoo de Enmedio, Campoo de Yuso, Valdeolea, Valdeprado del Río, Valderredible, Reinosa, Las Rozas de Valdearroyo, Santiurde de Reinosa, Pesquera, and San Miguel de Aguayo. The local inhabitants are called Campurrians (Campurrianos, in Spanish). Its highest elevation is the Cuchillón peak (2,225 m above sea level), and the lowest is Pesquera (560 m), with the capital, Reinosa at 850 m.

According to the Book of Merindades of Castile (from circa 1352), the merindad (subdivision) of Aguilar de Campoo comprised municipalities in the south of present-day Cantabria, as well as of northern Palencia and Burgos, with its capital at the Palentine Aguilar de Campoo (also the former capital of the vast marquisate of Aguilar de Campoo). Later the capital was moved to Reinosa, which still holds this status today. Since the province's division, Aguilar de Campoo has been part of the large comarca of Palentine Mountain.

== Geography ==
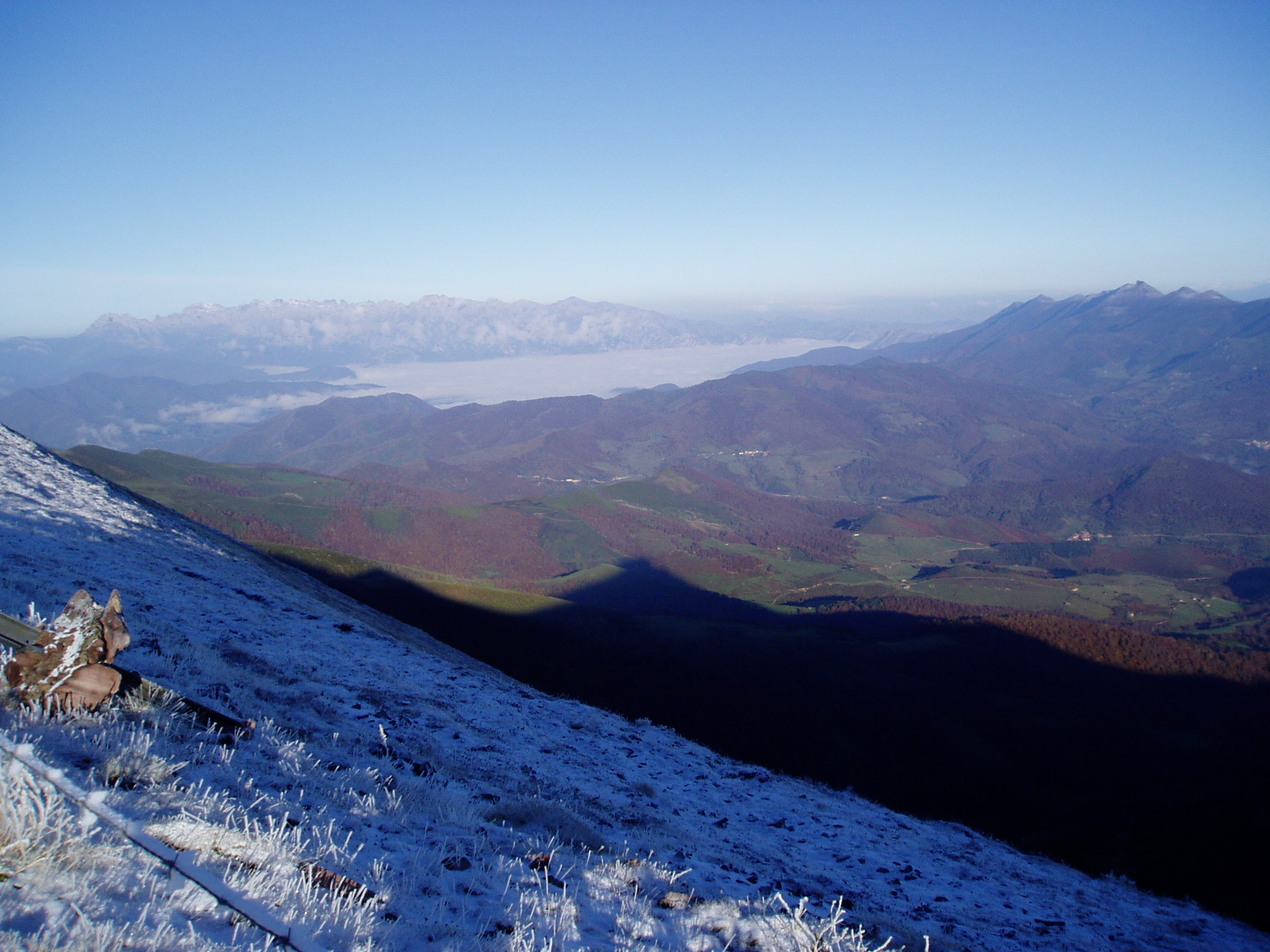
View from the ascent to Alto Campoo ski station.

Campoo is located in a transitional zone between the Eurosiberian and the Mediterranean regions of the Iberian Peninsula (see Forests of the Iberian Peninsula). Its climate is generally cold and humid, influenced by the continental and oceanic climates and moderated by the Ísar ridge and Cantabrian Mountains. This combination of climates is reflected in the region's very cold winters and mild summers, with no extreme temperatures. Around Reinosa, there is a more Mediterranean zone, comprising Valderredible and Valdeolea, and to the north, near the end of the Besaya River, the climate becomes clearly oceanic.

In the Híjar mountains is the source of the river of the same name, whose discharge is the main water contribution to the Ebro river, which has its origin in the locality of Fontibre. This river is dammed near Reinosa, forming one of the largest reservoirs in the Ebro river basin, acting as main regulator of the Navarre and Riojan irrigated lands. In these same mountain ranges, risen from tectonic activity between the end of the Cretaceous and the Oligocene (alpinotype orogeny), are the highest peaks of the comarca, the Cuchillón (2,225 m) and the Tres Mares (Three Seas; 2,180 m), so called because rivers flow from its mountainsides to all three Spanish river basins.

The Tres Mares is the point where the mountain ranges of Ísar and Híjar start, forming at its base a glacial valley open to the whole comarca. From its summits, the Bay of Biscay can be seen to the north, the nearby Picos de Europa to the northwest, the Cantabrian and Palentine Mountains to the southwest, the Meseta Central to the south, and the Pas valleys with the Encartaciones mountains to the east.

== Flora and fauna ==
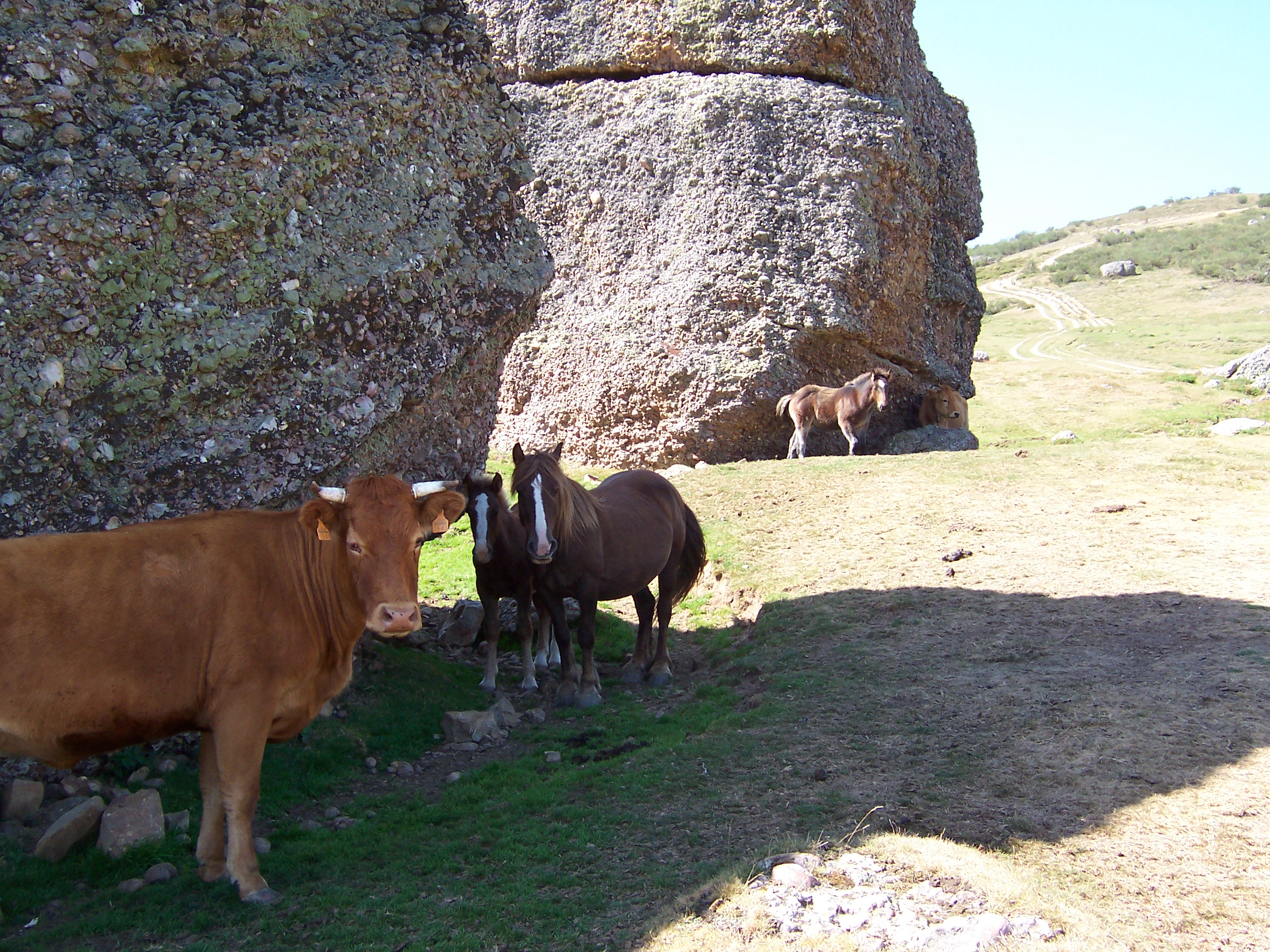
Cattle and horse livestock on Campurrian pastures.

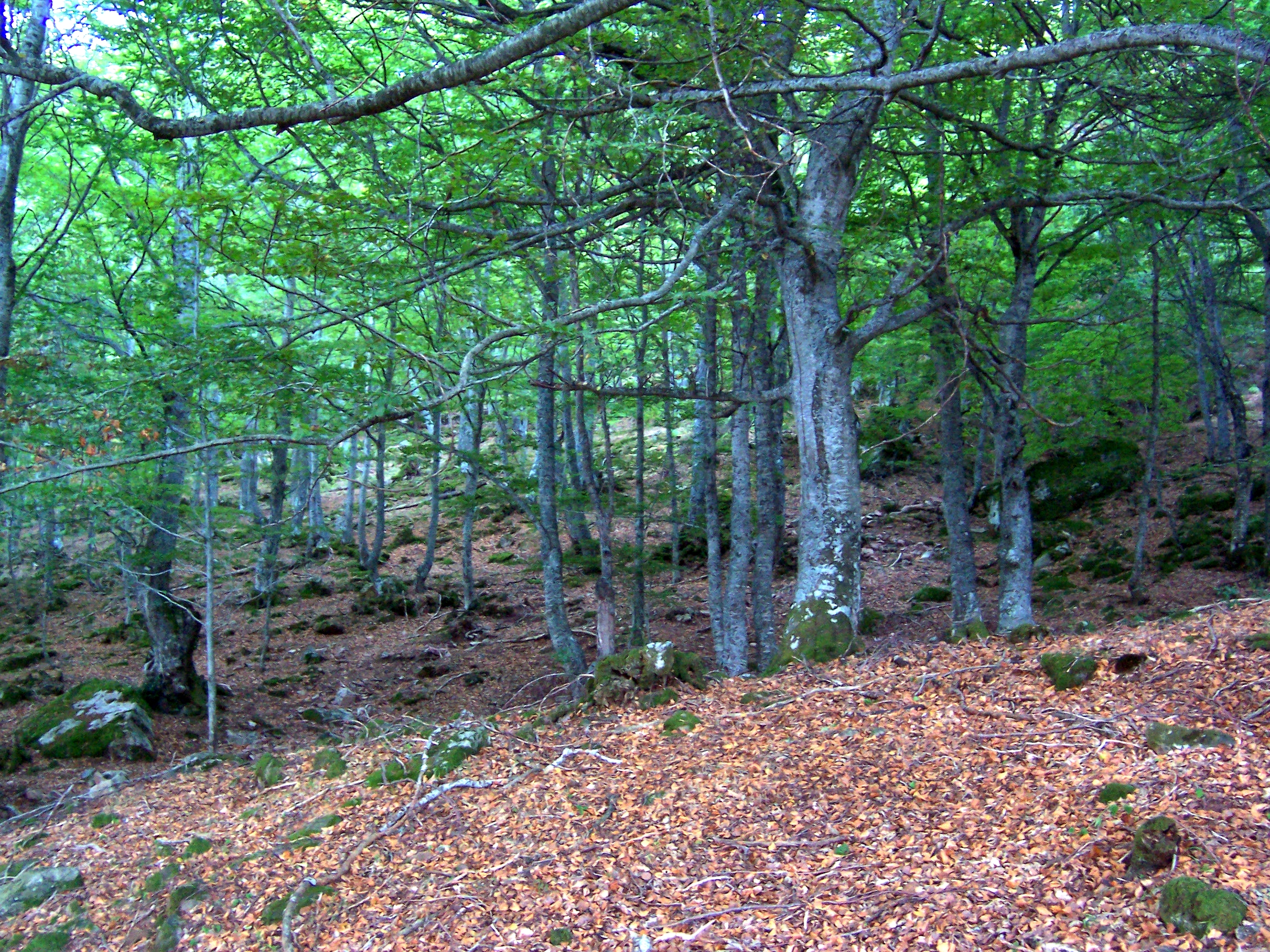
Umbrañal beech grove (La Lomba)

On the northern slope of the mountains, the beech and oak groves of the Saja-Besaya Natural Park are widespread. The area is a significant nature reserve abundant with red deer, roe deer and golden eagles. The presence of Iberian wolves is sometimes noted, and brown bears have been sighted, thus making this zone an important nexus of communication between isolated bear populations. There are also large colonies of griffon vultures in Polientes and the Híjar ridges. Other interesting species that populate the comarca include eagle owls, martens, badgers, stoats and desmans. In addition, the Ebro swamps are home to remarkable aquatic birds. Among its flora, as well as the aforementioned oak and beech groves, there are very significant populations of hollies and birches and excellent specimens of taxus, all of which are protected by Spanish law.

== People ==
The inhabitants of Campoo are called Campurrians (Campurrianos in Spanish) and their language is Spanish, influenced by an Asturleonese dialect.

The traditional costume is characteristic for its "albarcas", footwear similar to Asturian clogs, which are exquisitely carved from birch wood (nowadays they are industrially produced with beech). Another typical Campurrian accessory is the "palo pinto", a rod made of hazelwood and engraved by fire, which is used to help in walking up the mountains and to beat livestock.

The local economy has traditionally been connected to cattle, with Campurrians also being renowned carters and masons. The Campurrian carters were in charge of exchanging merchandise between the Castilian Mesa and the capital of the province (until the administrative reorganization of 1982, Santander was part of Old Castile, and also its capital), constantly retracing the footsteps of the Foramontanos who repopulated Castile.

== Culture ==
The day of Campoo is celebrated on the last Sunday of September, as part of the Saint Matthew festivities. The main activity of the day is a cart parade that depicts scenes of traditional everyday life, pulled by oxen and Tudanca cows. Other important festivities include Los Campanos in Abiada, celebrated on the first Sunday of September to commemorate the end of summer by bringing the cows down to the valley from the summer pastures, dressed in full regalia, and Las Nieves on August 15 in Naveda.

In the comarca there are many Romanesque buildings. Among these, the collegiate churches of Cervatos and San Martín de Elines and the Santa María la Mayor church of Villacantid stand out; other remarkable churches are those of Bolmir y Retortillo, San Andrés, and San Martín de Valdelomar.

Campurrian civil architecture includes abundant noble houses, with carved ashlars and sunny spots (Mazandrero, Naveda, Celada, Pesquera, etc.) In military architecture one piece must be remarked, the Argüeso castle, built in the 12th century and home to Don Íñigo López de Mendoza, Marquis of Santillana, from where he managed the Lordship of Campoo and his marquisate of Argüeso in the 15th century. Other interesting buildings are the tower of the Bustamantes in the Costana, and also those of Ruerrero, San Martín de Hoyos,Ríos de Proaño, and of Gómez-Bárcenas in San Miguel de Aguayo.

The Julióbriga city ruins, 4 km away from Reinosa, in Retortillo, deserve special mention. The city was founded by the IV Roman Legion in the 1st century BC upon an old Cantabrian castro. The Battle of Aracillum (Aradillos), an important event in the Romanization of Cantabria, took place in this area. The region resisted Romanization for over 200 years, one of the longest periods of assimilation in the history of the Roman Empire. Campoo was again the site of a significant military engagement two thousand years later, during the Spanish Civil War, when the Navarre Brigades broke the resistance of the Popular Front in the Híjar ridge, precipitating the Republican loss of Santander.

== Recent history ==
Halfway through the 1970s, the comarca underwent a process of depopulation and demographic ageing, due especially to the decline of the national company "La Naval" (Forges and Steels of Reinosa), which had previously maintained a thriving industry, with international prestige in naval construction and arms manufacturing. This notwithstanding, after a traumatic industrial conversion and significant development in tourism, Campoo faced a trade-off between maintaining the highly polluting siderurgy or basing its economy on tourism.

Nowadays, its main economic resources are the aforementioned tourism and siderurgy industries, as well as livestock (mostly cattle, but also horses). The growing development of tourist infrastructure, despite being one of Campoo's main economic drivers, is starting to put pressure on the ecological balance of the area. This fact has caused a proliferation of ecological associations seeking to achieve sustainable development as the only way to preserve the valleys.

== See also ==
- Alto Campoo ski station

== Bibliography ==
=== General ===
- Enciclopedia Universal Ilustrada Espasa.
- Menéndez-Pidal, Ramón. Historia de España. Ramón Menéndez Pidal / Madrid : Espasa-Calpe, 1989
- Pérez de Urbel, Justo. La España del siglo X : castellanos. y leoneses, navarros y gallegos, musulmanes y judíos, forjadores de historia / Madrid, Alonso, 1983
- Sánchez-Albornoz, Claudio. España : Un enigma histórico / Barcelona, Edhasa, D. L. 2001

=== Monographic ===
- El Conde Fernán González. Fray Justo Pérez de Urbel.
- Fueros de Brañosera dados por el conde Muñio Nuñez en 15 de octubre del año de 824. MyR. 16-18.
- Iglesias, J. M. Regio Cantabrorum. / Santander, Caja Cantabria. Oct.1999
- Muñíz, Juan A. Cántabros. La génesis de un pueblo. / Santander, Caja Cantabria.
