= Pesquera, Cantabria =

Pesquera
- Municipality
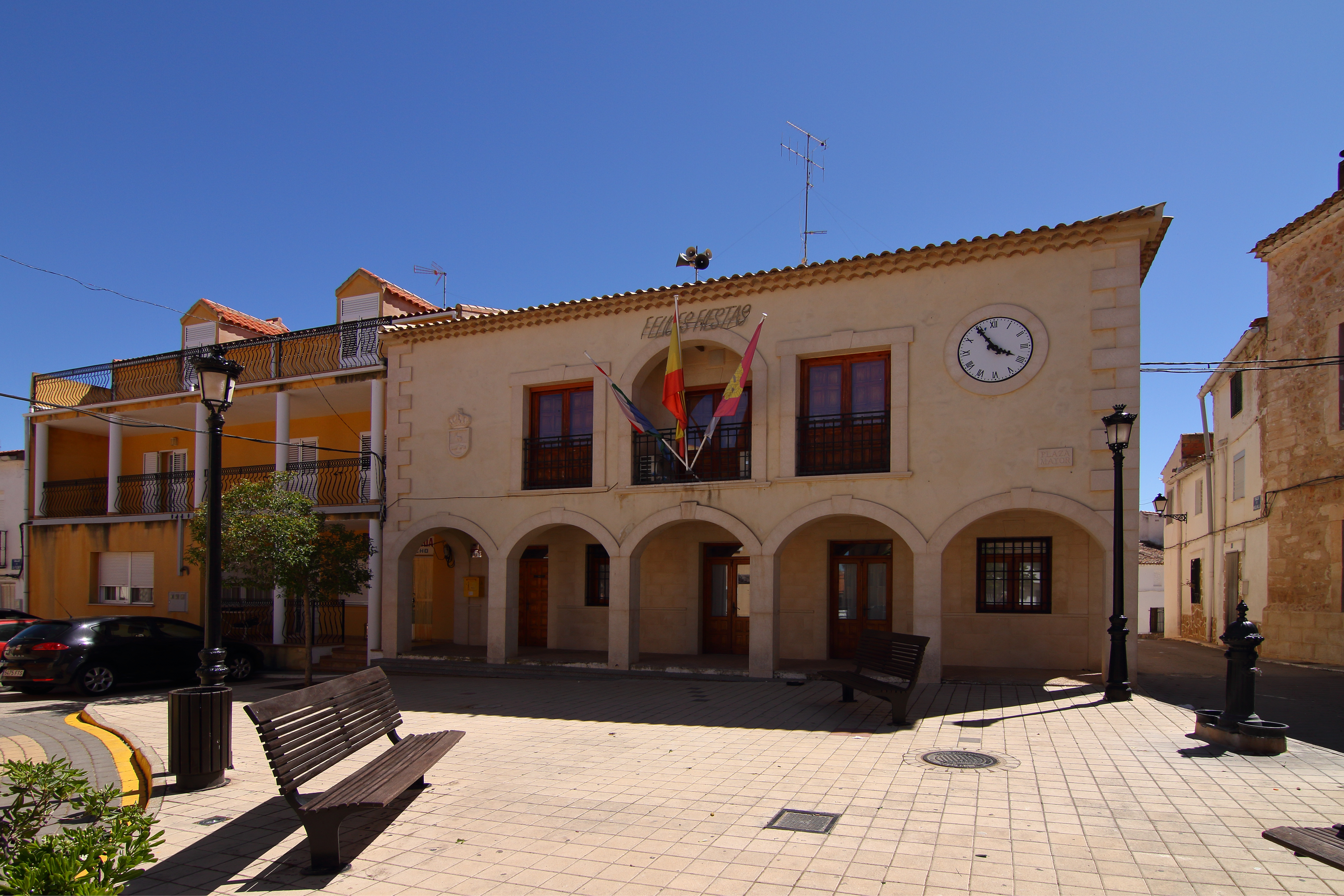
- Town hall

- Flag Coat of arms

- Location of Pesquera in Cantabria Location of Pesquera in Spain
- Coordinates: 43°9′15″N 4°2′27″W
- Country: Spain
- Autonomous community: Cantabria
- Province: Cantabria
- Comarca: Campoo
- Judicial district: Reinosa
- Capital: Pesquera

Government
  - Alcalde (Since 2019): Rubén Ruiz Fernández (AxP)

Area
  - Total: 8.93 km^{2} (3.45 sq mi)
- Elevation: 621 m (2,037 ft)

Population (2025-01-01)
  - Total: 72
  - Density: 8.1/km^{2} (21/sq mi)
- Time zone: UTC+1 (CET)
  - Summer (DST): UTC+2 (CEST)
- Website: ayuntamientodepesquera.es

Pesquera is a municipality located in the autonomous community of Cantabria, Spain.

== Localities ==
Its 69 inhabitants (INE, 2008) live in:

- Pesquera (Capital), 43 hab.
- Ventorrillo, 26 hab.
- Somaconcha, deshabitada.
