= Collegiate Church of San Pedro de Cervatos =

Collegiate church of San Pedro de Cervatos
- Colegiata de San Pedro de Cervatos (Spanish)
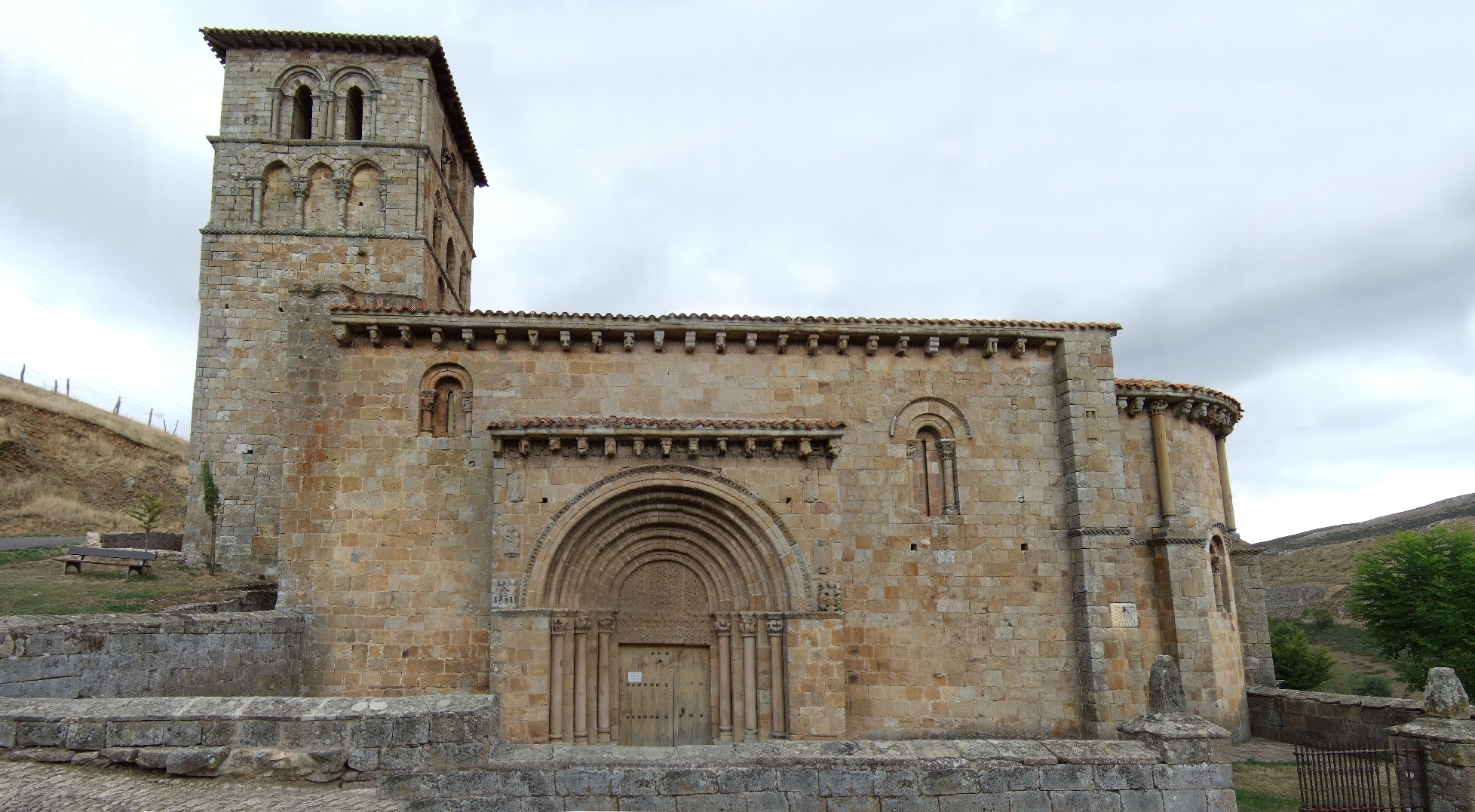

- Location within Spain
- 42.955887°N 4.148718°W
- Location: Campoo de Enmedio, Spain

Spanish Cultural Heritage
- Official name: Colegiata de San Pedro de Cervatos
- Type: Non-movable
- Criteria: Monument
- Designated: 1895
- Reference no.: RI-51-0000068

The Collegiate church of San Pedro de Cervatos (Spanish: Colegiata de San Pedro de Cervatos) is a collegiate church located in Campoo de Enmedio, Spain. The church was built around 1129. It has been protected by a heritage listing (currently Bien de Interés Cultural) since 1895.

== The entrance ==
The main entrance of the church is framed by a series of archivolts. The tympanum is profusely carved with vegetal motifs that are reminiscent of Al-Andalus art. The tympanum is supported by two superposed lintels. The one above is decorated with six lions while the one below with a vegetable motif. The archivolts are plain and stand on capitals decorated with animals and birds.

The doorway is protected by a cornice sustained by corbels carved with figures of dancers, monkeys and other fantastic creatures. Between the brackets, the metopes have also been sculpted with images of animals, birds and strange characters.

On the right hand side of the doorway an inscription in Latin states that the church was built around the year 1129. A second inscription, also in Latin, explains that it was consecrated to Saint Peter in the year 1199 by bishop Marin, while he was abbot Marin.

== The apse ==
The exterior of the apse shows a great variety of sculptural motifs both in the windows as well as in the brackets under the cornice. Many of these sculptures depict explicit sexual images, which was not unusual in Romanesque Art.

== The interior ==
The interior consists of a single nave covered with gothic vaults. Only the head of the church retains the original Romanesque elements. The interior of the apse is decorated with an arcade of round arches that stand on sculpted capitals, the whole inspired by the art of Cluny. The capitals are decorated with either vegetable designs or figurative motifs such as fantastic animals and birds.

== The tower ==
The bell toward was built at a later stage than the church, probably towards the end of the 12th century, around the time it was consecrated by bishop Marin.

== Gallery ==
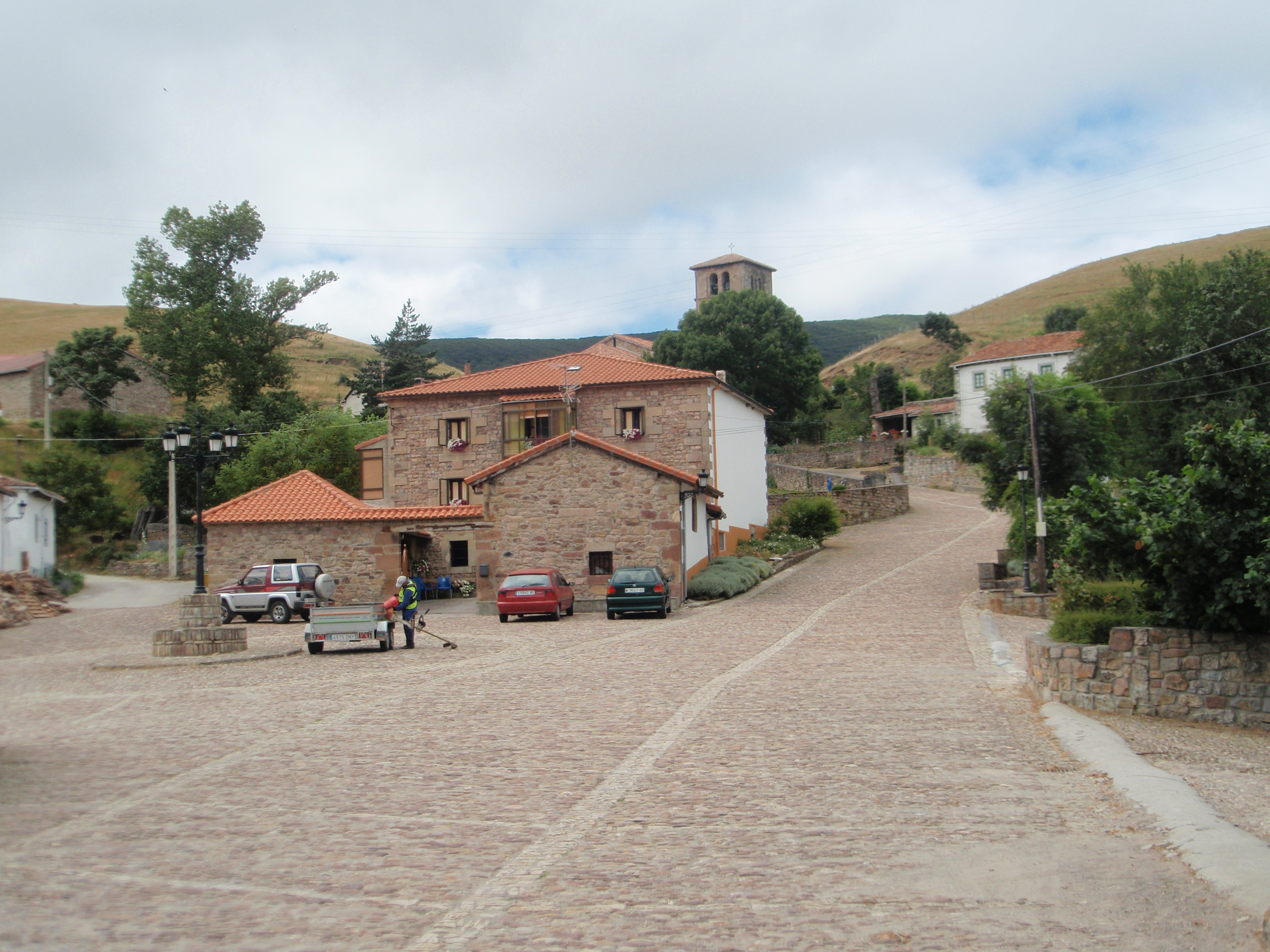
Campoo de Enmedio

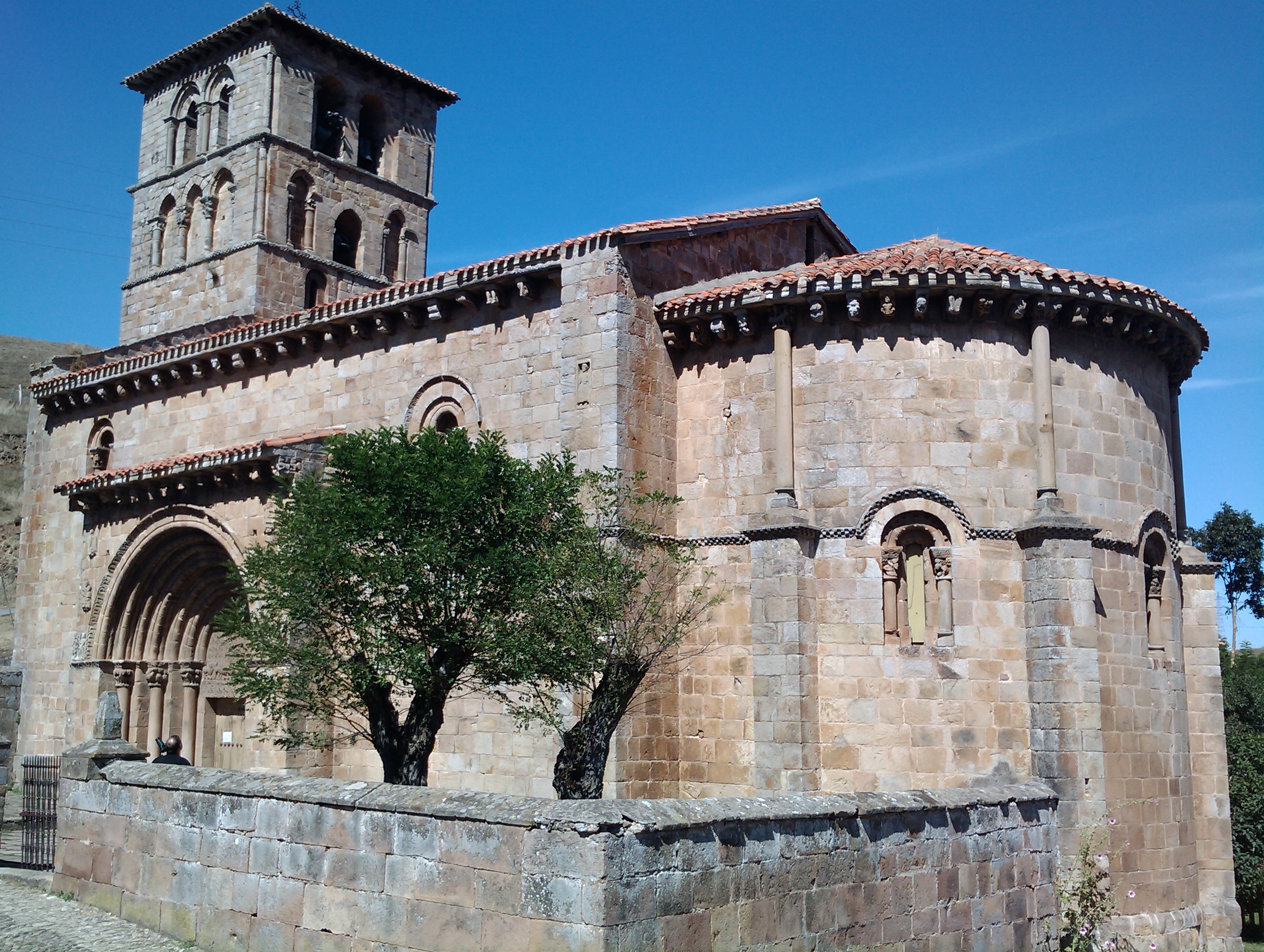
The church of San Pedro

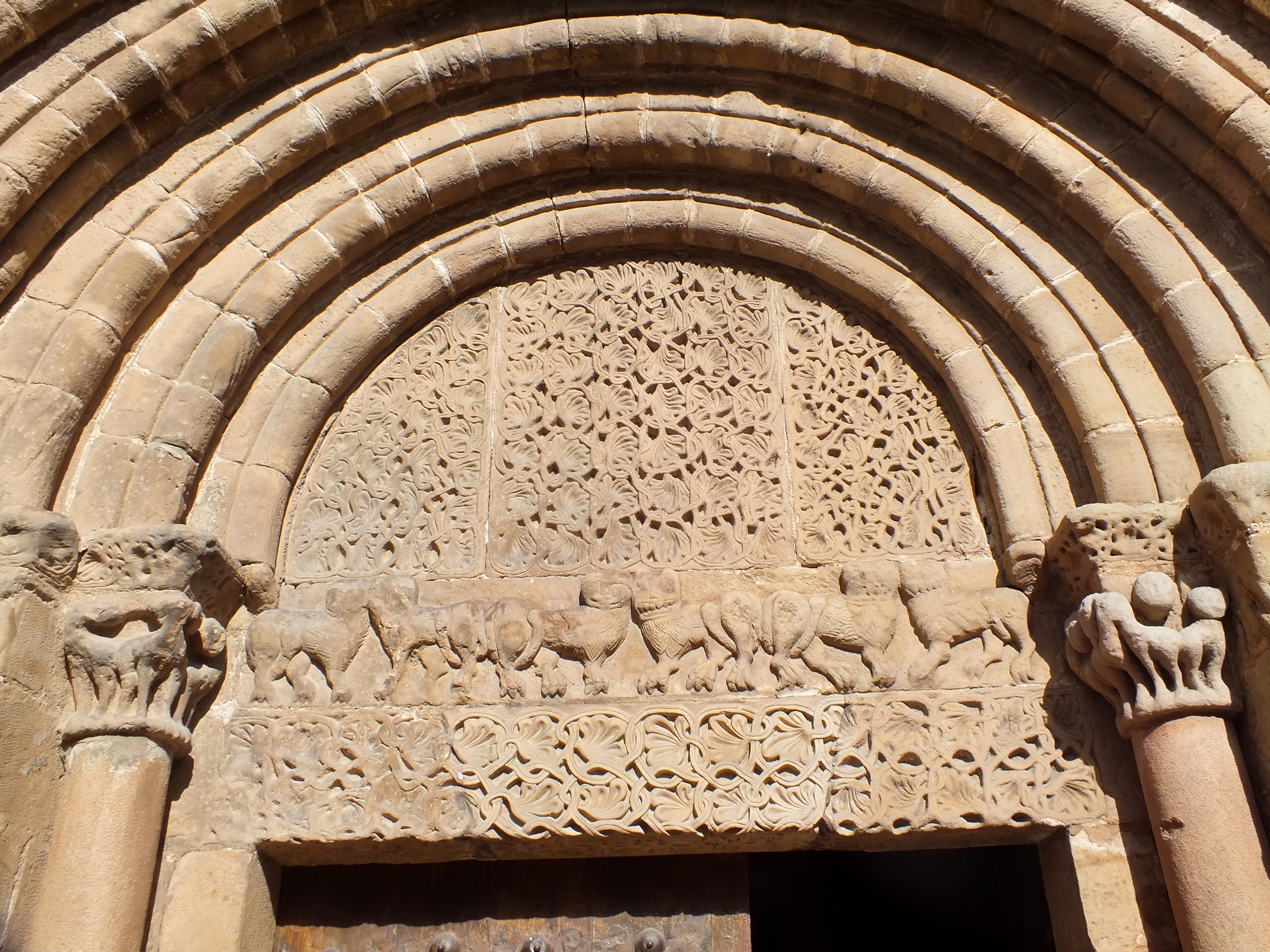
The tympan of the south door

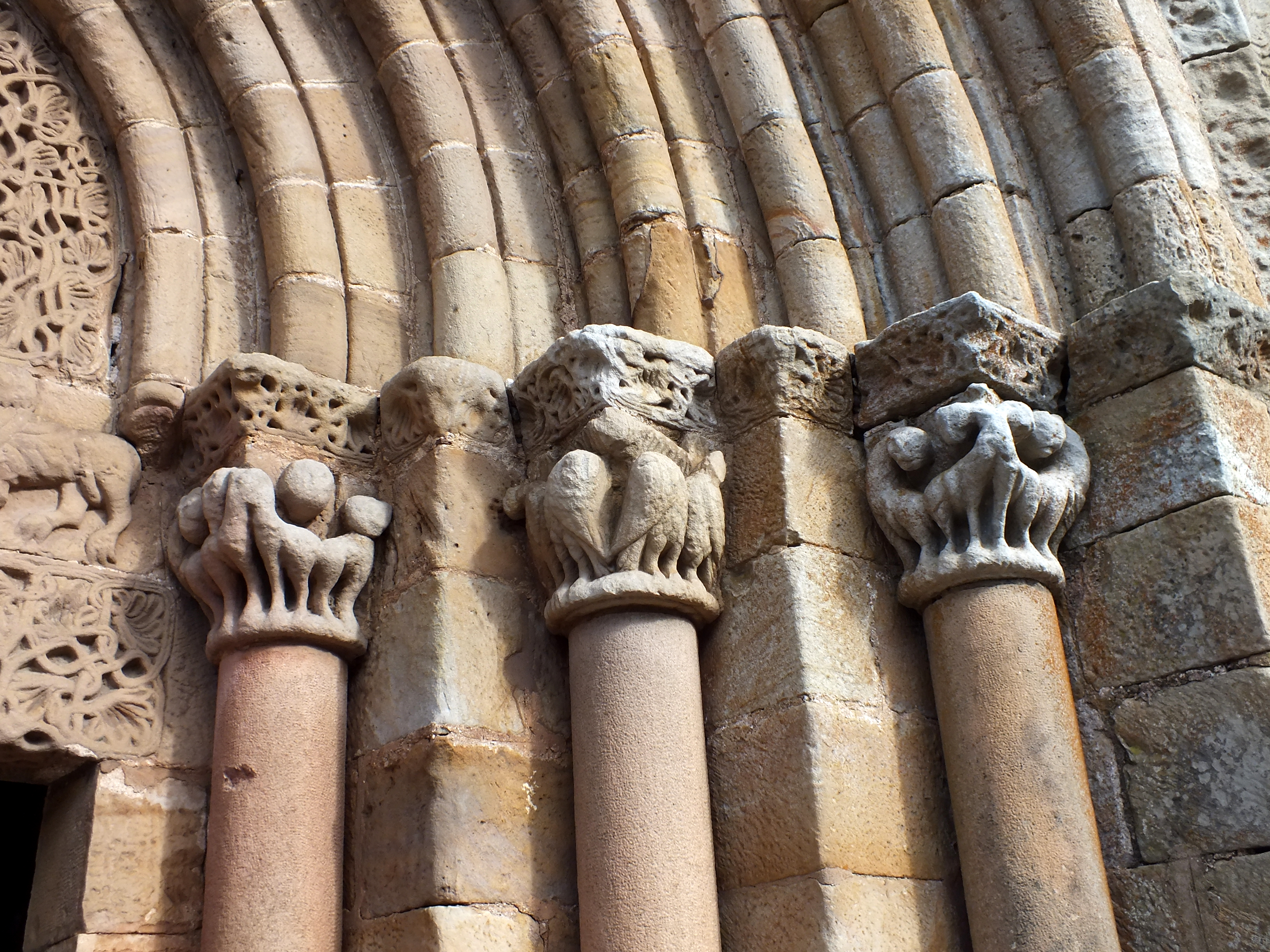
Decorated capitals of the south door

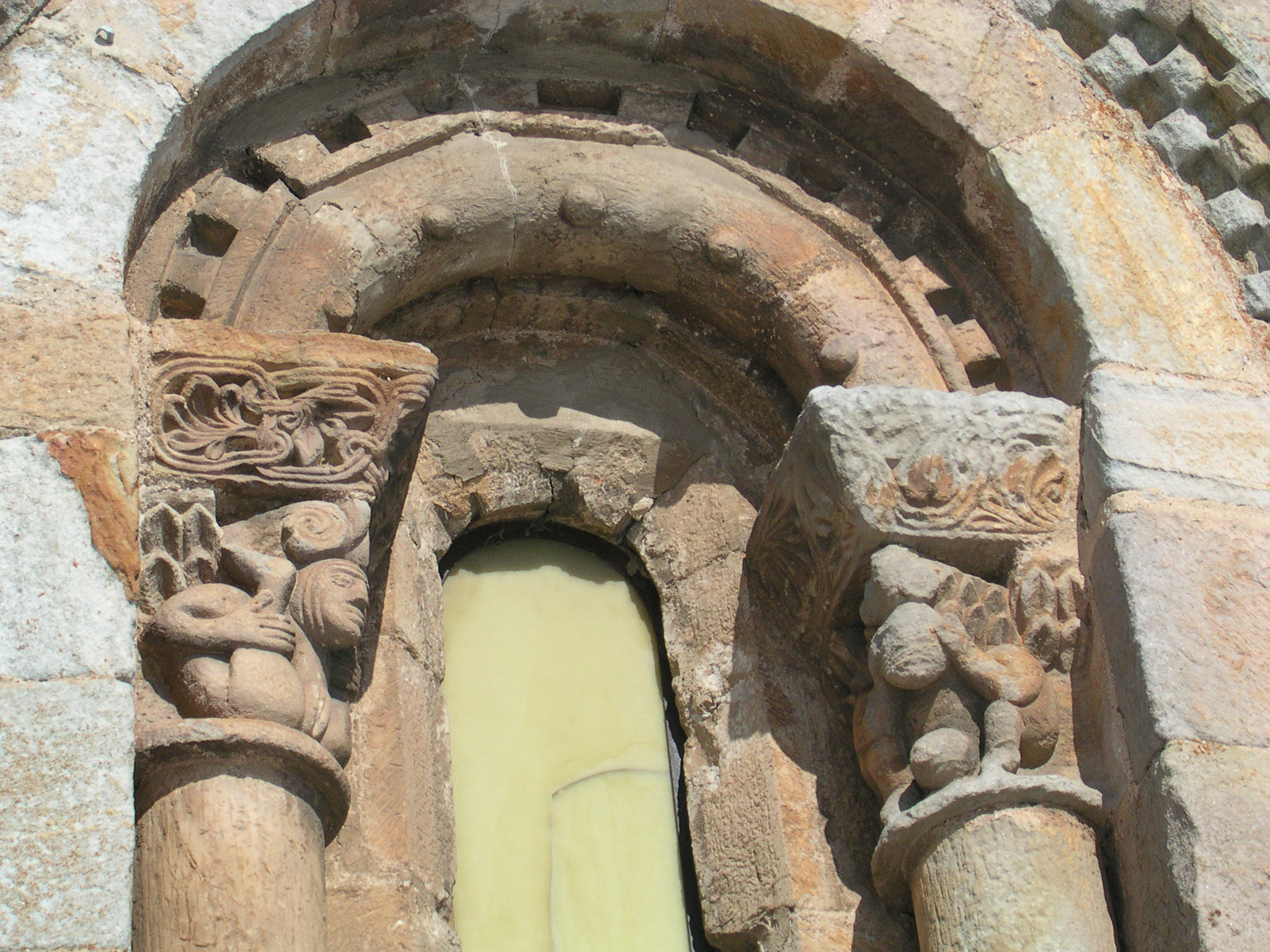
Window of the south apse

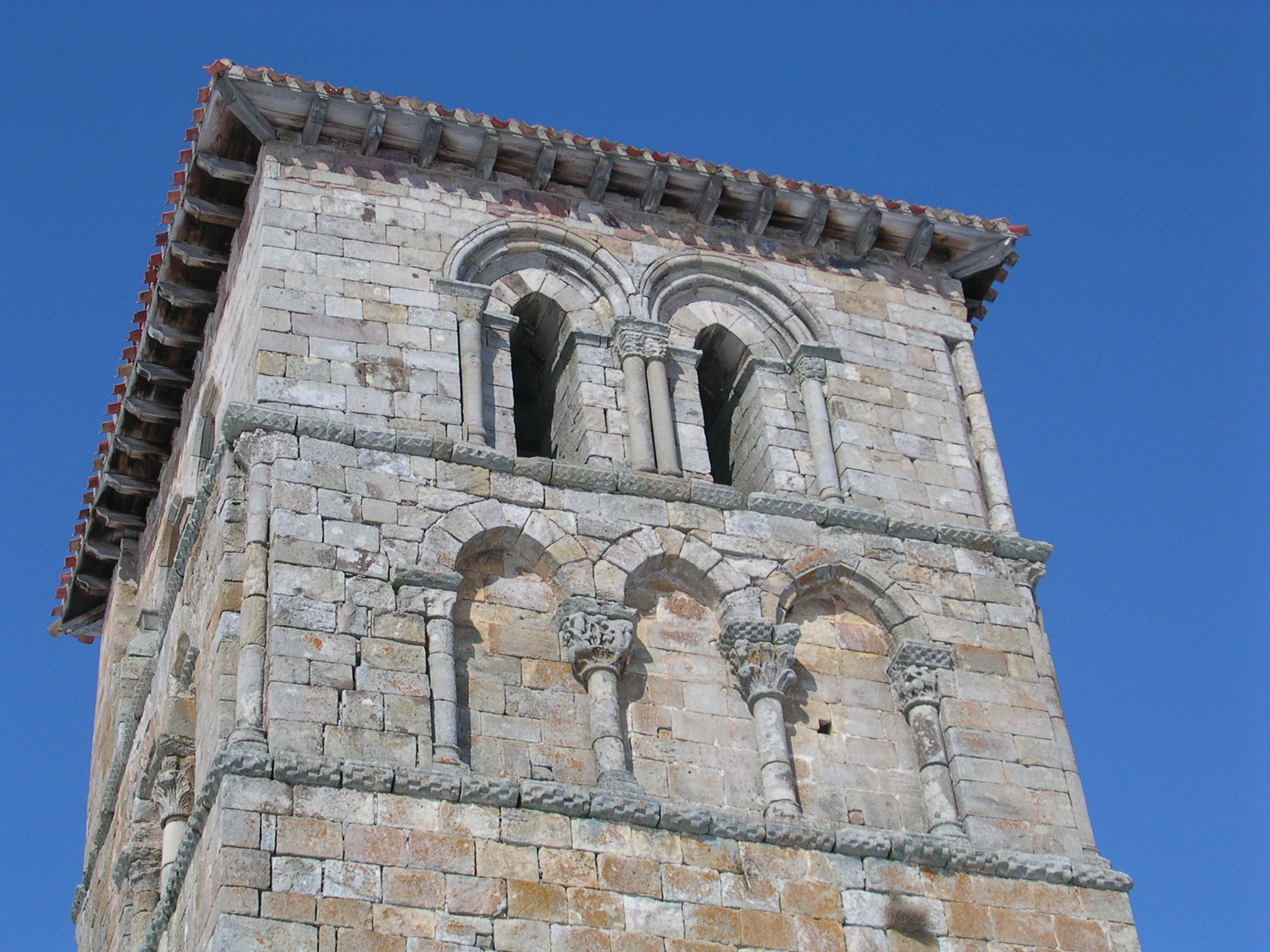
The tower
