= Valdeprado del Río =

- Municipality
- Coat of arms

- Location of Valdeprado del Río

- Location in Spain
- Coordinates: 42°54′38″N 4°4′32″W
- Country: Spain
- Autonomous community: Cantabria
- Province: Cantabria
- Comarca: Campoo
- Judicial district: Reinosa
- Capital: Arroyal

Government
  - Alcalde: Jaime Soto Marina

Area
  - Total: 89.33 km^{2} (34.49 sq mi)
- Elevation: 957 m (3,140 ft)

Population (2025-01-01)
  - Total: 306
  - Density: 3.43/km^{2} (8.87/sq mi)
- Time zone: UTC+1 (CET)
  - Summer (DST): UTC+2 (CEST)

Valdeprado del Río is a municipality located in the autonomous community of Cantabria, Spain.

== Localities ==
Its 291 inhabitants (INE, 2006) live in:

- Aldea de Ebro, 9 hab.
- Arcera, 48 hab.
- Arroyal (Capital), 62 hab.
- Barruelo, 35 hab.
- Bustidoño, 11 hab.
- Candenosa, 1 hab.
- Hormiguera, 33 hab.
- Laguillos, 7 hab.
- Malataja, 17 hab.
- Mediadoro, 13 hab.
- Reocín de los Molinos, 26 hab.
- San Andrés, 29 hab.
- San Vitores, 8 hab.
- Sotillo, 22 hab.
- Valdeprado del Río, 36 hab.
