= San Miguel de Aguayo, Spain =

San Miguel de Aguayo
- Municipality
- Flag Coat of arms

- Location of San Miguel de Aguayo

- Location in Spain
- Coordinates: 43°3′26″N 4°1′15″W
- Autonomous community: Cantabria
- Province: Cantabria
- Comarca: Campoo
- Judicial district: Reinosa
- Capital: San Miguel de Aguayo

Government
  - Alcalde: Alberto Fernández Saiz

Area
  - Total: 36 km^{2} (14 sq mi)
- Elevation: 830 m (2,720 ft)

Population (2025-01-01)
  - Total: 164
  - Density: 4.6/km^{2} (12/sq mi)
- Time zone: UTC+1 (CET)
  - Summer (DST): UTC+2 (CEST)

San Miguel de Aguayo is a municipality located in the autonomous community of Cantabria, Spain.

== Localities ==
Its 153 inhabitants (INE, 2008) are distributed in the villages of:

- San Miguel de Aguayo (Capital), 97 hab.
- Santa María de Aguayo, 56 hab.
- Santa Olalla de Aguayo, 7 hab.
