= Valderredible =

- Municipality
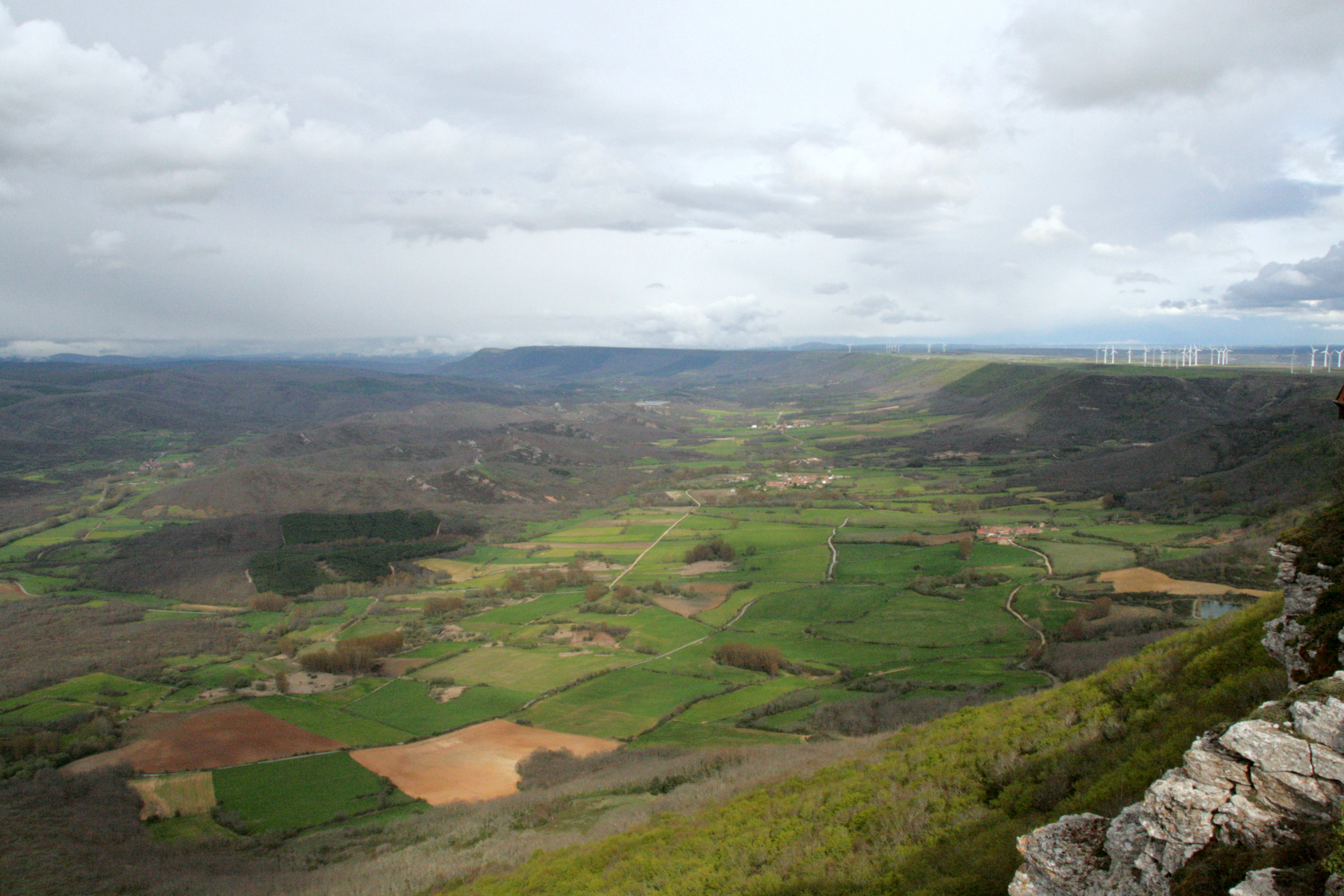
- View of Valderredible

- Flag Coat of arms

- Location of Valderredible in Cantabria Location of Valderredible in Spain
- Coordinates: 42°48′26″N 3°56′21″W
- Country: Spain
- Autonomous community: Cantabria
- Province: Cantabria
- Comarca: Campoo
- Judicial district: Reinosa
- Seat: Polientes

Government
  - Alcalde: Luis Fernando Fernández Fernández (Since 2005) (PRC)

Area
  - Total: 303.74 km^{2} (117.27 sq mi)

Population (2025-01-01)
  - Total: 922
  - Density: 3.04/km^{2} (7.86/sq mi)
- Time zone: UTC+1 (CET)
  - Summer (DST): UTC+2 (CEST)
- Official language(s): Spanish
- Website: valderredible.es

Valderredible is a municipality in Cantabria, Spain.

The Astronomical Observatory of Cantabria is located here.
