= Las Rozas =

Las Rozas may refer to:

== Places ==
Spain

- Las Rozas de Madrid, municipality in the Community of Madrid
- Las Rozas de Valdearroyo, municipality in Cantabria

== Sport ==
- Las Rozas CF, Spanish football club
- Las Rozas Black Demons, American football club from Las Rozas de Madrid, Spain
