= Astronomical Observatory of Cantabria =

Observatory in Spain

Coordinates: 42°46′14″N 3°56′42″W

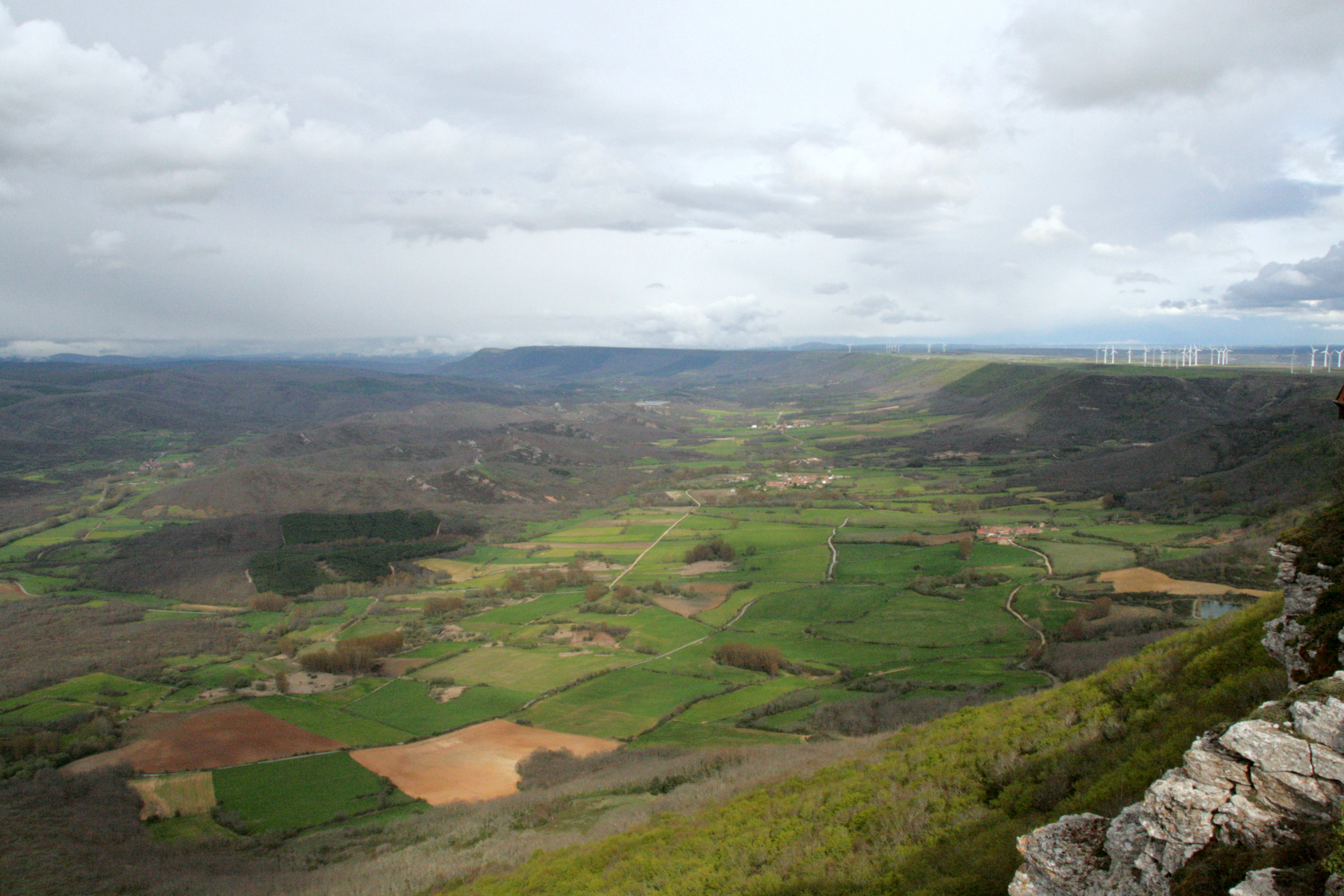
Valderredible Valley

The Astronomical Observatory of Cantabria (OAC) is a center of the Ministry of the Environment of the Government of Cantabria, Spain, located in the municipality of Valderredible. The OAC is managed by the Environment Research Center (CIMA). Other entities that participate are the University of Cantabria, the Institute of Physics of Cantabria and the Astronomical Association of Cantabria.

The observatory consists of a main telescope with a diameter of 40 cm, and several smaller telescopes that are dedicated to the popularization of astronomy.
