= Valdeolea =

- Municipality
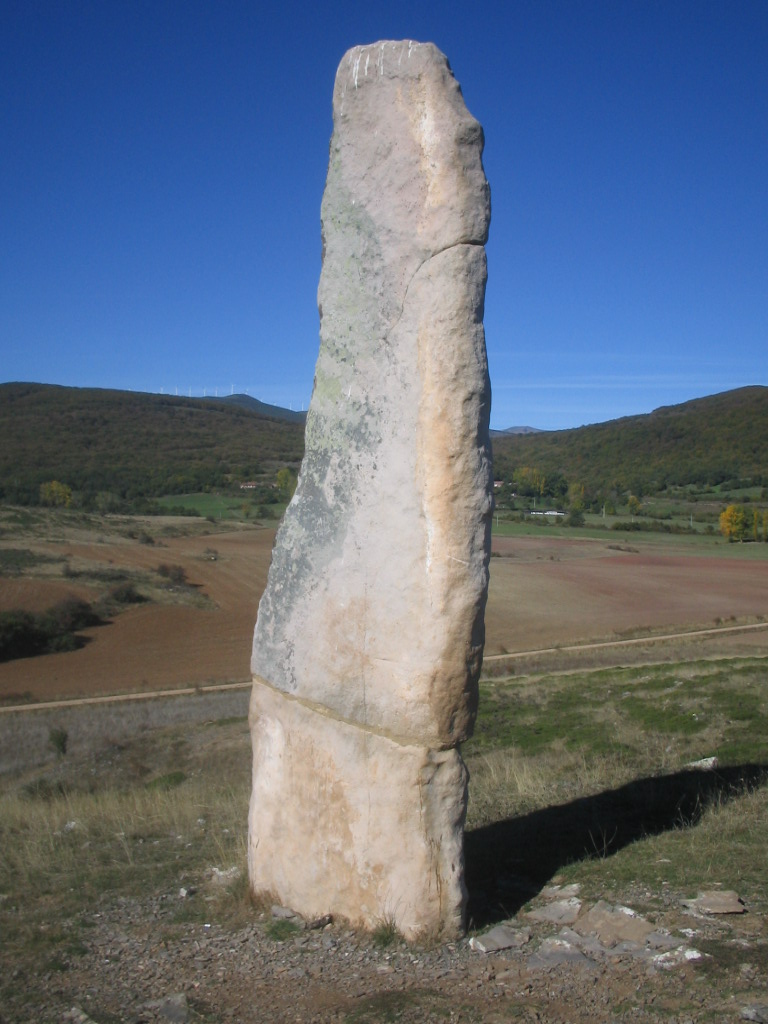
- Menhir El Cabezudo.

- Flag Coat of arms

- Location in Spain
- Coordinates: 42°52′40″N 4°9′44″W
- Country: Spain
- Autonomous community: Cantabria
- Province: Cantabria
- Comarca: Campoo
- Judicial district: Reinosa

Government
  - Mayor: Fernando Franco González

Area
  - Total: 83.72 km^{2} (32.32 sq mi)
- Elevation: 953 m (3,127 ft)

Population (2025-01-01)
  - Total: 869
  - Density: 10.4/km^{2} (26.9/sq mi)
- Time zone: UTC+1 (CET)
  - Summer (DST): UTC+2 (CEST)
- Postal code: 39410

Valdeolea (Spanish pronunciation: [baldeoˈlea]) is a municipality in Cantabria, northern Spain. It is located in a hill region crossed by the Camesa river and its numerous affluents.

It is formed by 19 towns and villages: Barriopalacio, Bercedo, Camesa, Castrillo del Haya, Cuena, El Haya, Las Henestrosas de las Quintanillas, Hoyos, La Loma, Mata de Hoz, Mataporquera, Matarrepudio, Olea, La Quintana, Las Quintanillas, Rebolledo, Reinosilla, San Martín de Hoyos and Santa Olalla. Mataporquera is the largest of them, with some 1,000 inhabitants, and also the municipal seat.

The municipal territory is home to eight menhirs, located on the left bank of the Camesa in the Monte Omeda site. It also houses remains from the Roman age and the Middle Ages. Also notable is the Romanesque churches of Santa Eulalia la Toma (1176), Santa Maria de las Henestrosas de las Quintanilla (12th century), and Santa Maria (at Olea), modified in the 16th-17th centuries.
