= Campoo de Yuso =

- Municipality
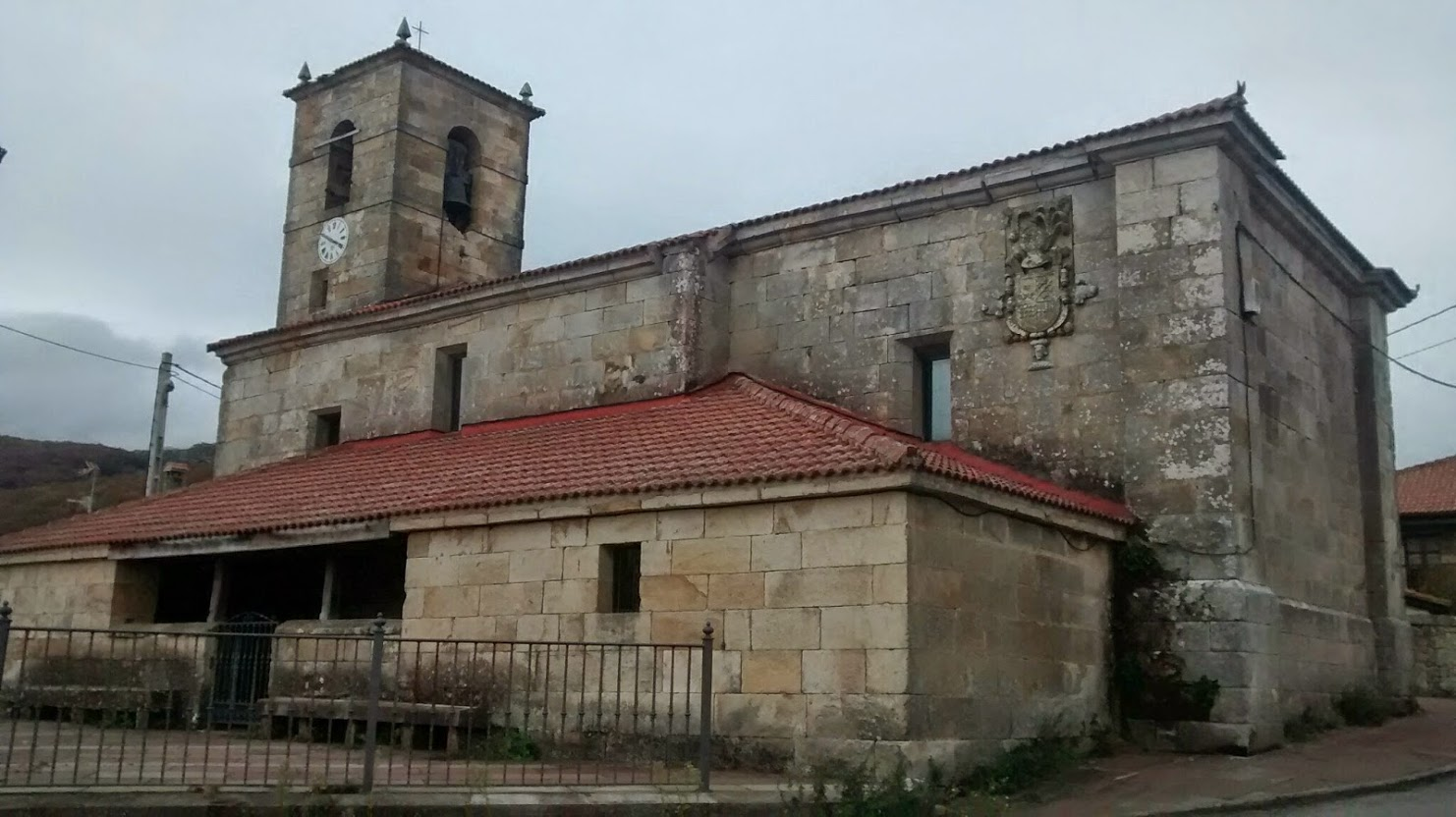

- Flag Coat of arms

- Location of Campoo de Yuso

- Location within Cantabria Campoo de Yuso (Spain)
- Coordinates: 43°1′2″N 4°0′13″W
- Country: Spain
- Autonomous community: Cantabria
- Province: Cantabria
- Comarca: Cantabria
- Judicial district: Reinosa
- Capital: La Costana

Government
  - Alcalde: Eduardo Ortiz García (2007) (PRC)

Area
  - Total: 89.72 km^{2} (34.64 sq mi)
- Elevation: 851 m (2,792 ft)

Population (2025-01-01)
  - Total: 680
  - Density: 7.6/km^{2} (20/sq mi)
- Time zone: UTC+1 (CET)
  - Summer (DST): UTC+2 (CEST)
- Website: Official website

Campoo de Yuso is a municipality located in the autonomous community of Cantabria, Spain. According to the 2007 census, the city has a population of 759 inhabitants. Its capital is La Costana.
