= Las Rozas de Valdearroyo =

- Municipality
- Flag Coat of arms

- Location of Las Rozas de Valdearroyo

- Location in Spain
- Coordinates: 42°58′26″N 4°1′37″W
- Country: Spain
- Autonomous community: Cantabria
- Province: Cantabria
- Comarca: Campoo
- Judicial district: Reinosa
- Capital: Las Rozas

Government
  - Alcalde: Raúl Calderón

Area
  - Total: 57.4 km^{2} (22.2 sq mi)
- Elevation: 834 m (2,736 ft)

Population (2025-01-01)
  - Total: 258
  - Density: 4.49/km^{2} (11.6/sq mi)
- Time zone: UTC+1 (CET)
  - Summer (DST): UTC+2 (CEST)

Las Rozas de Valdearroyo is a municipality located in the autonomous community of Cantabria, Spain.

== Localities ==
- La Aguilera.
- Arroyo.
- Bimón.
- Bustasur.
- Llano.
- Renedo.
- Las Rozas (Capital).
- Villanueva.
