= Alto Campoo =

Ski resort in the Cantabrian Mountains of northern Spain

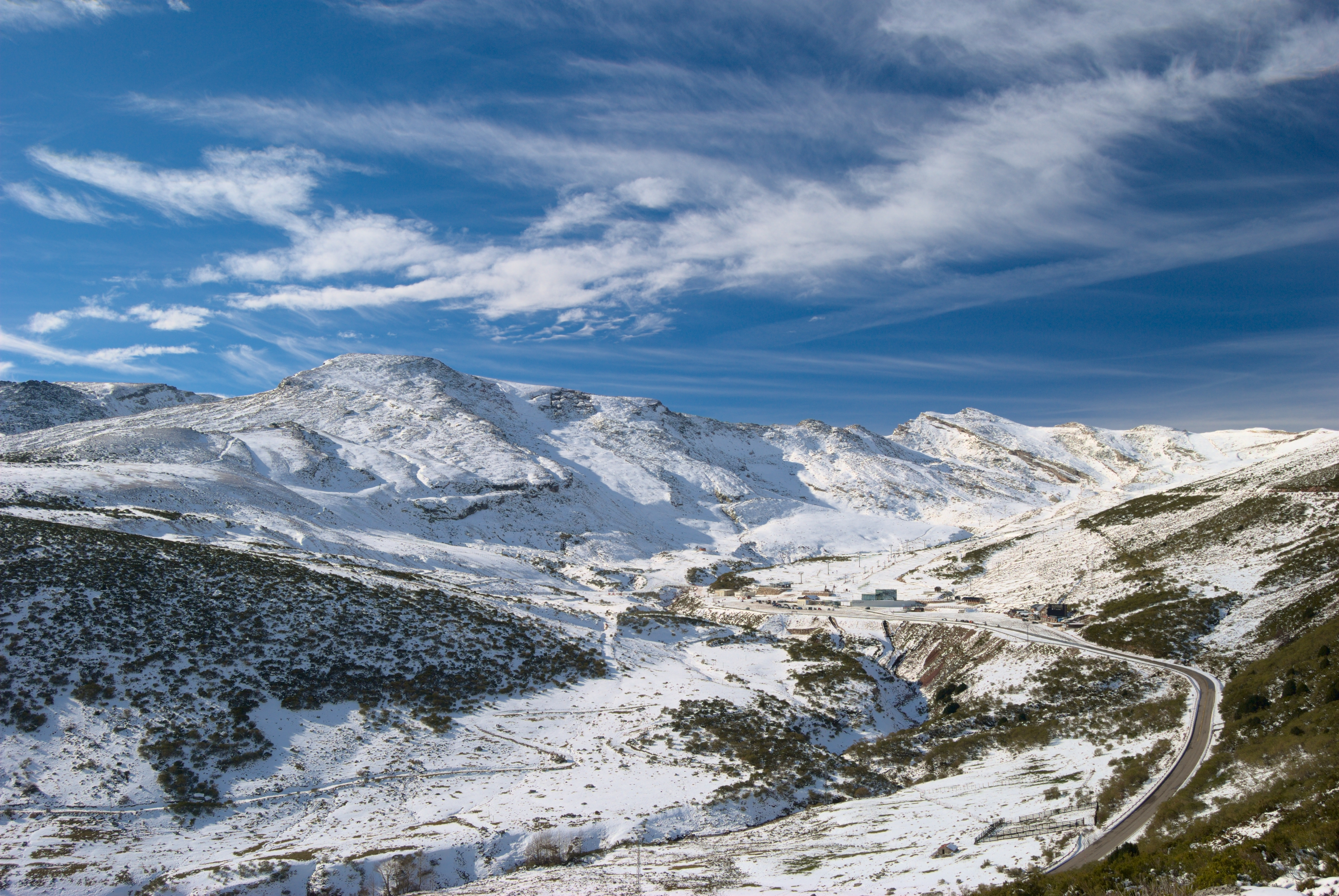
- General view of the resort

- Location within Cantabria Location within Spain
- Location: Cantabrian Mountains, Spain
- Nearest city: Reinosa
- Coordinates: 43°2′13.65″N 4°22′24.83″W
- Top elevation: 2,250 metres (7,380 ft)
- Base elevation: 1,650 metres (5,410 ft)
- Skiable area: 28 kilometres (17 mi)
- Trails: 23
- Lift system: 5 chair lifts. 8 ski tows.
- Website: https://www.altocampoo.com

Alto Campoo is a ski resort in the Cantabrian Mountains of northern Spain. The resort is located in the Cantabrian comarca of Campoo. The source of the river Ebro is near the resort in the town of Fontibre.

== Resort ==
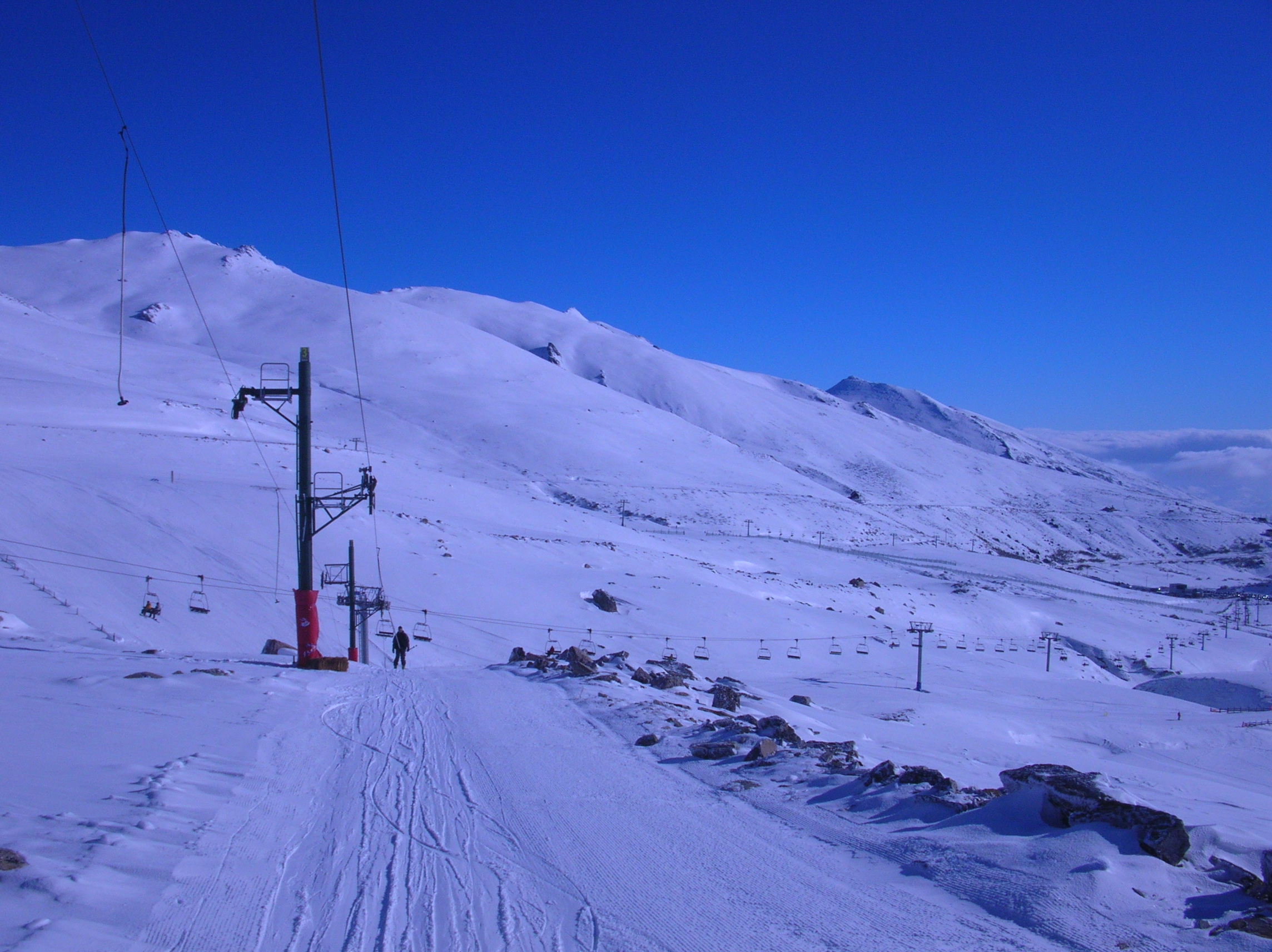
Tres Mares peak

With 28 kilometres (17 mi) of marked pistes, it is one of the biggest resorts of the Cantabrian Mountains. The highest point is Cuchillón peak, at 2,250 metres (7,380 ft) above sea level, with a vertical drop of 600 metres (2,000 ft).

The base of the resort is a purpose-built town called Brañavieja which includes several apartments and is situated at 1,650 metres (5,410 ft) above sea level. From there a four-seat chair lift provides the main access for the resort. The resort itself occupies a high mountain valley. The valley is accessible by car, with a parking and service area at its base from where the lifts depart.

=== Lifts ===
Many of the resort's lifts are modern and of high capacity. The resort has:

- 5 chair lifts.
- 8 ski tows.

=== Pistes ===
The resort offers 23 pistes of different difficulties:

- 4 beginners.
- 9 easy.
- 10 intermediate.

=== Services ===
- 2 restaurants.
- 1 skiing school.
- 1 snow gardens for children.
- 1 kindergarten
- 1 ski hiring stores.

== Vuelta a España ==
The Alto Campoo climb has been used in four stages of the Vuelta a España and the Colombian rider José Antonio Agudelo Gómez was the first man to climb the mountain in the Vuelta.

=== Appearances in Vuelta a España (since 1985) ===
Year	Stage	Start of stage	Distance (km)	Category	Stage winner	Leader in the general classification
1985	7	Cangas de Onís	190	HC	José Antonio Agudelo Gómez (COL)	Pello Ruiz Cabestany (ESP)
1987	10	Miranda de Ebro	213	HC	Enrique Aja (ESP)	Reimund Dietzen (GER)
1993	16	Santander	160	HC	Jesús Montoya (ESP)	Tony Rominger (SUI)
2015	14	Vitoria	213	HC	Alessandro De Marchi (ITA)	Fabio Aru (ITA)
