= Santiurde de Reinosa =

- Municipality
- Location of Santiurde de Reinosa

- Location in Spain
- Coordinates: 43°3′44″N 4°4′54″W
- Autonomous community: Cantabria
- Province: Cantabria
- Comarca: Campoo
- Judicial district: Reinosa
- Capital: Santiurde de Reinosa

Government
  - Alcalde: Borja Ramos

Area
  - Total: 30.98 km^{2} (11.96 sq mi)
- Elevation: 658 m (2,159 ft)

Population (2025-01-01)
  - Total: 254
  - Density: 8.20/km^{2} (21.2/sq mi)
- Time zone: UTC+1 (CET)
  - Summer (DST): UTC+2 (CEST)

Santiurde de Reinosa is a municipality located in the autonomous community of Cantabria, Spain.

== Localities ==
Its 317 inhabitants (INE, 2008) are distributed in the villages of:

- Lantueno, 131 hab.
- Rioseco, 46 hab.
- Santiurde de Reinosa (Capital), 95 hab.
- Somballe, 44 hab.
