= Naveda =

Naveda is a surname. Notable people with the surname include:

- Beto Naveda (born 1972), Argentine footballer
- Ricardo Naveda (1899–1981), Spanish footballer
- Santiago Naveda (born 2001), Mexican footballer
