= Campoo de Enmedio =

- Municipality
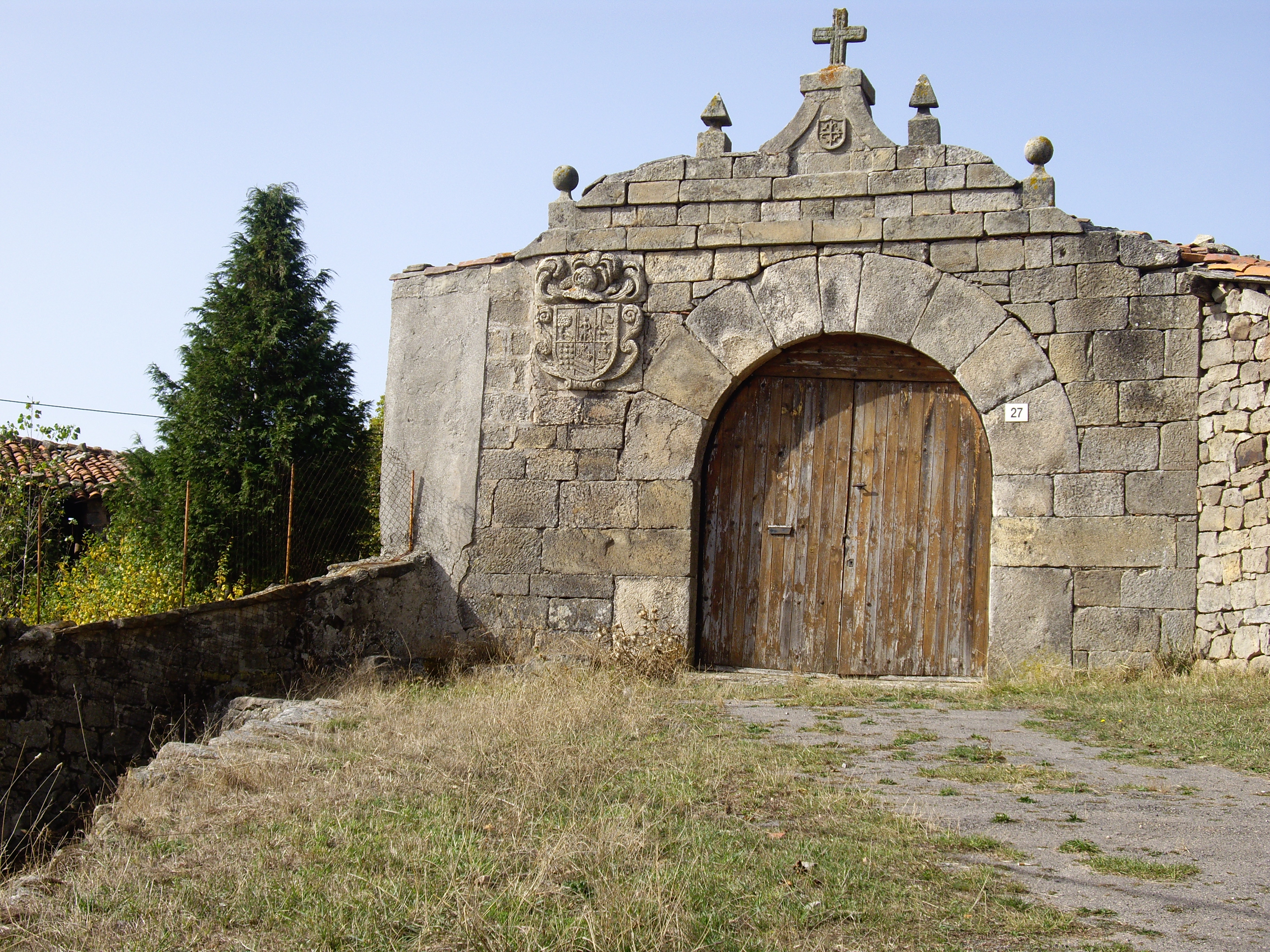

- Flag Coat of arms

- Location of Campoo de Enmedio

- Location within Cantabria Campoo de Enmedio (Spain)
- Coordinates: 42°58′54″N 4°8′50″W
- Country: Spain
- Autonomous community: Cantabria
- Province: Cantabria
- Comarca: Campoo
- Judicial district: Reinosa
- Capital: Matamorosa

Government
  - Alcalde: Gaudencio Carmelo Hijosa Herrero (2007) (PSC-PSOE)

Area
  - Total: 91.05 km^{2} (35.15 sq mi)
- Elevation: 855 m (2,805 ft)

Population (2025-01-01)
  - Total: 3,729
  - Density: 40.96/km^{2} (106.1/sq mi)
- Time zone: UTC+1 (CET)
  - Summer (DST): UTC+2 (CEST)

Campoo de Enmedio is a municipality located in the autonomous community of Cantabria, Spain. According to the 2007 census, the city has a population of 3.996 inhabitants. Its capital is Matamorosa.

Celada Marlantes is a locality within the municipality.
