= Montesclaros High School =

School in Cerceda, Madrid, Spain

Montesclaros High School (Spanish: Colegio Montesclaros) is located in the town of Cerceda, Madrid, a region in the middle of Spain.

The School was founded in 2009.

Cerceda is the main town, and some of the students attend the School but many other students come from neighbouring villages. A new scout group is going to be established futurely and sections are:

  - Beaver scouts (Spanish: Castores), from 5/6 to 8/9 years.
  - Cub scouts (Spanish: Lobatos), from 8/9 to 10/11 years.
  - Scouts (Spanish: Scouts), from 11/12 to 13/14 years.
  - Explorers (Spanish: Escultas), from 13/14 to 16/17 years.
  - Rovers, from 17/18 to 20/21 years.
  - Scout leaders (Spanish: Scouters, from 20/21 years and up.

The neckerchief of the group has the colors red, grey and white Mottos and colours:

- Yellow
  - Beaver scouts: Compartir (sharing). Colour: Turquoise
  - Cub scouts: Haremos lo mejor (We will do our best). Colour: Yellow
  - Scouts: Siempre listos (Be prepared). Colour: Green
  - Explorers: Unidad (Unit). Colour: Brown
  - Rovers: Servir (Serving). Colour: Red

The scout group's name is Grupo Scout Waigunga 216, belonging to ASDE. They meet every saturday at from 4-6 p.m. and go camping and do field trips once a term.
