= Fontibre =

Human settlement

Coordinates: 43°01′04″N 4°11′19″W

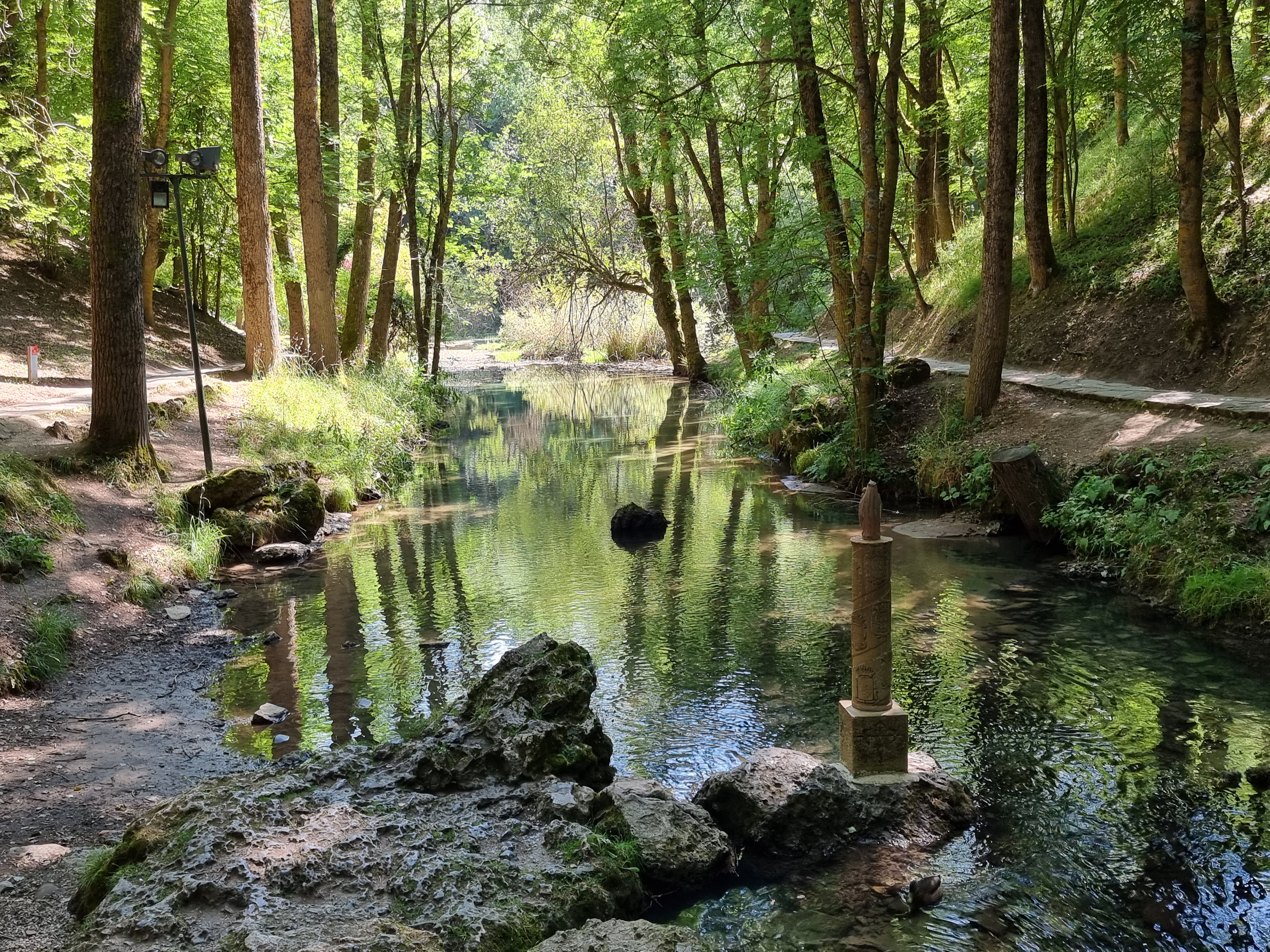
The source of the Ebro in Fontibre.

Fontibre is a locality of the municipality Hermandad de Campoo de Suso, in Cantabria. It is located 3 km from Reinosa.

The source of the Ebro River is located in Fontibre. The name derives from the Latin words Fontes Iberis, meaning "Springs of Iberia".
