= Reinosa =

- Municipality
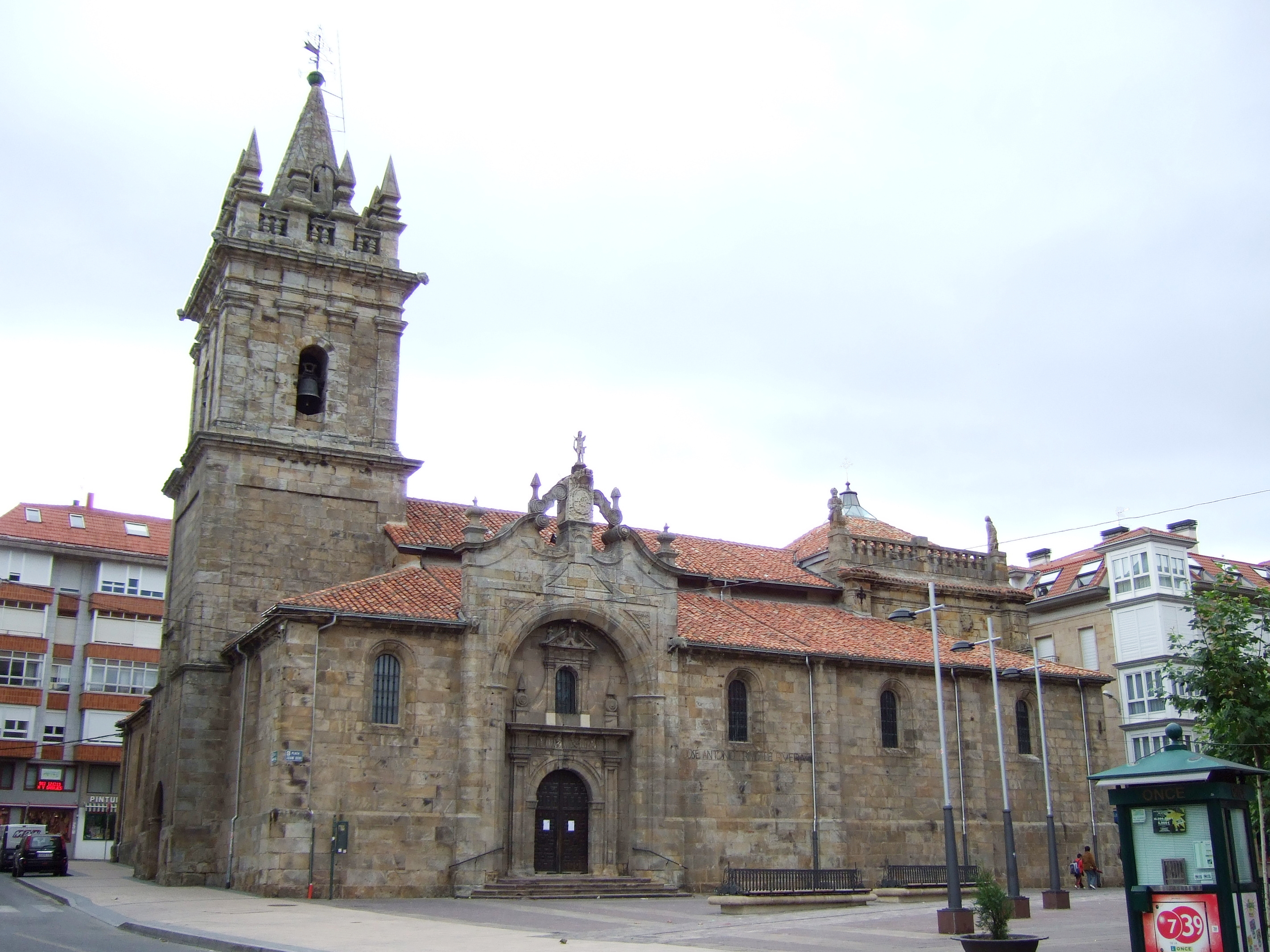
- Church of San Sebastián (16th century).

- Flag Coat of arms

- Location of Reinosa in Cantabria Location of Reinosa in Spain
- Coordinates: 43°0′7″N 4°8′16″W
- Country: Spain
- Autonomous community: Cantabria
- Province: Cantabria
- Comarca: Campoo
- Judicial district: Reinosa

Government
  - Alcalde: José Miguel Barrio (2009) (PRC)

Area
  - Total: 4.12 km^{2} (1.59 sq mi)
- Elevation: 851 m (2,792 ft)

Population (2025-01-01)
  - Total: 8,570
  - Density: 2,080/km^{2} (5,390/sq mi)
- Demonym: Reinosanos
- Time zone: UTC+1 (CET)
  - Summer (DST): UTC+2 (CEST)
- Official language(s): Spanish
- Website: Official website

Reinosa is a municipality in Cantabria, Spain. As of 2009, it has 10,307 inhabitants. The municipality, one of the smallest by land area in Cantabria, is notable for being one of the nearest towns to the headwaters of the Ebro River. It is surrounded by the municipality of Campoo de Enmedio and was created a city by King Alfonso XIII in 1927, being one of only three urban centres in Cantabria with that honour, the others being Santander and Torrelavega.

== History ==
The first documents mentioning the town date back to the year 1000, when it was divided into four solars by Sancho García, the Count of Castile. By 1404, it was emerging as the main town of the region and was organised into seven Hermandades, military units aimed at retaining law and order. The procurators of these brotherhoods met once a month with the Corregidor to organise the town's affairs.

In 1497, Prince John, son of Queen Isabella I of Castile and King Ferdinand II of Aragon met his affianced wife Margaret of Austria here, the meeting or marriage ceremony probably taking place in La Casa de las Princesas.

In 1517 Charles V, Holy Roman Emperor was passing through the town when he was taken ill. He stayed for nine days at the Convento de San Francisco while he recovered. The convent was being built at the time, and a hundred years later had thirty friars while the town had five hundred inhabitants. In the eighteenth century, under the Bourbons, a new highway and a bridge over the River Ebro were built. These works contributed to an economic boom in the region and the town becomes a bustling and prosperous place, on one of the main routes to the port of Santander. In 1927 it received its charter as a city from King Alfonso XIII.

== Geography ==
Reinosa is the largest town in this area of Cantabria and is on the main railway line and located close to the A67 motorway. The town contains a number of hotels and restaurants, and Montesclaros High School is located here. The source of the River Ebro is in the village of Fontibre where a stream emerges from the ground 3 kilometres (2 mi) from the town; a large artificial lake Embalse del Ebro was created in the Franco era by damming the river just below Reinosa. This is one of the largest reservoirs in northern Spain and is mainly filled in spring as a result of the melting of the winter snow in the mountains. The lake is the uppermost of many reservoirs on the Ebro.

== Twin towns ==
- Deltebre, Spain, located at the mouth of the Ebro River.
