= Nine Valleys lawsuit =

- Part of History of Camtabria
- Map of the merindades that existed in the territory of present-day Cantabria. The Nine Valleys were integrated in that of Santillana.
- Native name: Pleito de los Nueve Valles
- English name: Nine Valleys lawsuit
- Duration: 1544 - 1581
- Location: Santillana del Mar, Spain
- Type: Lawsuit
- Cause: Designation of Íñigo López de Mendoza as lord of the valleys and the claim of his realengo by the valleys themselves
- Organized by: Chancellery of Valladolid
- Participants: Asturias de Santillana Valleys against the Dukedom of the Infantado

The Nine Valleys lawsuit (Spanish: Pleito de los nueve Valles) or simply Valleys lawsuit was a legal battle between the Nine Valleys of the Asturias de Santillana (present-day Cantabria, in Spain) and the Dukedom of the Infantado. It was initiated in 1544, and a ruling was issued in 1581 in favor of the Nine Valleys. This result was important in the process of the territorial configuration of Cantabria, since it achieved the independence of the valleys, which were constituted in the province of the Nine Valleys in 1589. This was later formed into the province of Cantabria in 1778, and caused the retreat of the manorial domains in the region. The memorial occupies 178 folios.

The Asturias of Santillana were organized in valleys perpendicular to the sea. That is to say, despite the rise of feudalism, the contemporary society did not have only the village as its nucleus, but there were connections between all the villages in a valley, with a sort of federation of councils. Each valley had its board and ordinances. When the neighbors of those territories litigated against the nobility, they did so therefore through the representation of each valley. The lawsuit was not isolated in time, as other regions of present-day Cantabria tried to shake off the lordly rule, as happened in Liébana.

== History ==
=== Context ===
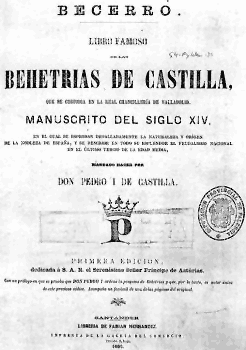
Book of the Becerro de Behetrías, where the valleys appear and, specifically, the valley of Carriedo (called Carrieto) with the condition of royal property, although in later documents it is first attached to the counts of Castañeda and later to the dukes of Infantado.

During the Late Middle Ages the territory that today is Cantabria was divided into merindades, fiscal and legal administrative divisions of the kingdom of Castile controlled by a merino. Their different parcels had different degrees of administration. They could be of realengo (dependent on the king of Castile), of abadengo (of an abbot), solariegas (of a nobleman) and of behetría (of the Crown, but subordinated to a nobleman, freely elected, to whom to pay tribute).

From the 12th century and, mostly, from the 13th century, this territory was dominated by the nobility to the detriment of the power of the abbots, who since the 9th century had held the privileges of the region, especially those of the St. Juliana Abbey. The privileges of the lords continually swelled, obtaining more territories by royal grace or usurpation of territories formerly belonging to the Crown of Castile in terms of taxes, authority and jurisdiction. In turn, the rights of the peasantry, who had originally been able to elect their lords, were diminished. The Asturias de Santillana valleys, before the power of the first Duke of Infantado spread through them, were free to hold general assemblies. The first that was documented happened in 1430 in the Campo del Revolgo of the town of Santillana. The increase of the lordly power is documented by comparison between the Becerro de Behetrías (1351) and the Apeo of 1404, both documents that indicate the conditions of the places. In the first one there are more territories of realengo and behetría and in the second one more of manorialism.

One of the most important lords of the 14th century was Garci Lasso de la Vega I, favourite of Alfonso XI of Castile and chancellor of Valladolid, who was chief of name and of arms of the House de La Vega and obtained territories in the Asturias de Santillana. During the 15th century, the de la Vega family confronted the power of the Crown of Castile, creating the figure of the mayordomazgo to extend their power, an administrative system controlled by them. The Vega family received in 1341, from the hand of Alfonso XI, the valleys of Carriedo, Villaescusa, Cayón, Camargo and Cabezón, along with other properties. Leonor de la Vega, heiress of the lineage, married Diego Hurtado de Mendoza, thus forming the House de la Vega-Mendoza. Their firstborn, Íñigo López de Mendoza, was left at the death of Leonor with the territories of the Asturias de Santillana. In 1445, King John II of Castile confirmed his possessions, a fact that the valleys did not recognize as lawful.

Although the House de la Vega—later united with the house of Mendoza—was the most powerful, other noble families disputed the territories, even in some of the nine valleys. This is the case of the counts of Castañeda, who took possession by force of some areas of the valley of Camargo.

It must be said that at the beginning of the 16th century, in the territories controlled by the Duke of Infantado, and especially the Asturias de Santillana, the peasantry suffered a continuous increase in taxes, which stirred up discontent. Independence from manorial rule was desirable, since taxes could remain in symbolic amounts. This situation occurred in Trasmiera, the valleys of Soba and Ruesga, and in that of Carriedo since the Duke of Infantado lost power after the sentence of 1505. In addition, some of these communities did not have to pay tariffes for importing basic necessities. However, after the lawsuit was won and the nine valleys returned to the royal manor status, the fiscal pressure intensified even more.

=== The first lawsuits ===
It is often considered that the Valleys lawsuit lasted from 1438 until its resolution in 1581 or even until the creation of the province of the Nine Valleys in 1589; that is, about 150 years. In reality it was a series of lawsuits, the first of which was the "Old Valleys Lawsuit", which favored the manorial power.

==== The Old Valleys lawsuit (1438–1444) ====
At the beginning of the 12th century, the peasantry of the Merindad of the Asturias de Santillana, fed up with their situation, rose up in various lawsuits against the De la Vega-Mendoza. The Old Valleys Lawsuit began in 1438 because the valleys disputed their belonging to the manorialism of Íñigo López de Mendoza, arguing that during the last decades they had allowed to remain under the rule of the house de la Vega only because they thought the king had not heard their complaints, being the holder a friend of theirs. During the mandate of Leonor de la Vega, the tact of the latter, a "true lady", had prevented the complaints from erupting. However, Íñigo entered the valleys with great violence, taking possession of them by force of arms, which provoked the anger and rebellion of the peasants.

In 1444, the first lawsuit was ruled by the corregidor of the Asturias de Oviedo in favor of Íñigo López de Mendoza, who soon after obtained the titles of marquis of Santillana and count of Real de Manzanares. This fact meant the delivery of Santillana del Mar to the Marquis of Santillana, and therefore the end of its merindad and its general boards, since the jurisdiction of the Asturias de Santillana became a privilege of the De la Vega-Mendoza houses, which was confirmed by Juan II in 1448.

Don Juan by the grace of God, King of Castile, of Leon, of Toledo (...). ) Because the Prince, my very dear and beloved son, ceded and transferred to you Yñigo Lopez de Mendoça my vassal, and of my council, all and any right and demand and appeal, that in any way to my belonging and belonging could, in the valleys and districts, and terms of certain valleys of Asturias de Santillana, and in each one of them on which is this dispute and debate, contention and controversy, between me and my procurator, and Fiscal procurators of the one part and the Procurator or Procurators of the said Yñigo Lopez of the other part, in the which lawsuit they were received in evidence, and date determined by the parts, likewise the property as well, as to that of the ownership of the said places and valleys, and terminos, and districts, and of all the aforementioned, and of the civil and criminal, high and low jurisdiction, mero et mixto imperio, and of all the rents and facts and rights, and of the things pertaining to the manorialism of all the aforementioned (...) as it is said, in you and your successors, universal and singular, and in whoever you want and for good you want, without annoyance or disturbance, or any disturbance, from me or my successors.

This marquisate included the valleys of Carriedo—later split after its lawsuit—, Cayón, Penagos, Villaescusa, Piélagos, Camargo, Reocín, Cabezón, Cabuérniga, Alfoz de Lloredo—all of them split after the Nine Valleys lawsuit—, Anieva, Cieza and Lamasón, as well as the town of Santillana, the domains grouped under the name Tierra de la Vega (English: "Land of de La Vega"), and Pando (now Torrelavega). In 1475 the marquis of Santillana also received the dukedom of the Infantado.

==== The Carriedo lawsuit (1495–1499) ====
Leonor de la Vega, in her will, had bequeathed the valley of Carriedo to Íñigo López de Mendoza, despite the fact that this valley did not belong to her since in 1403 a conflict regarding its possession had been settled with the corregidor of the Hermandad de las Cuatro Villas de la Costa. However, in 1495 the peasantry of the said valley wanted to emancipate themselves, presenting their request before the monarchy in what is known as the Carriedo lawsuit. Carriedo, located southeast of the Asturias de Santillana, then belonged to the Velasco family and was coveted by the Mendozas; the peasants were reluctant to fall in front of the lords, who used violence to make them desist from their efforts. The lawsuit was ruled by the chancillería de Valladolid in 1499 in favor of the valley, which thus achieved its jurisdictional independence. The sentence was appealed and again confirmed in 1504, 1505 y 1546.

In the Carriedo lawsuit, the valley declared that it had not denounced its lordly situation during the reigns of John II and Enrique IV of Castile "because there was always favour and wars and fears". Like Carriedo, the other prosecuted valleys of the Asturias de Santillana later claimed that they too had never considered manorial domination legitimate.

=== The Nine Valleys lawsuit ===
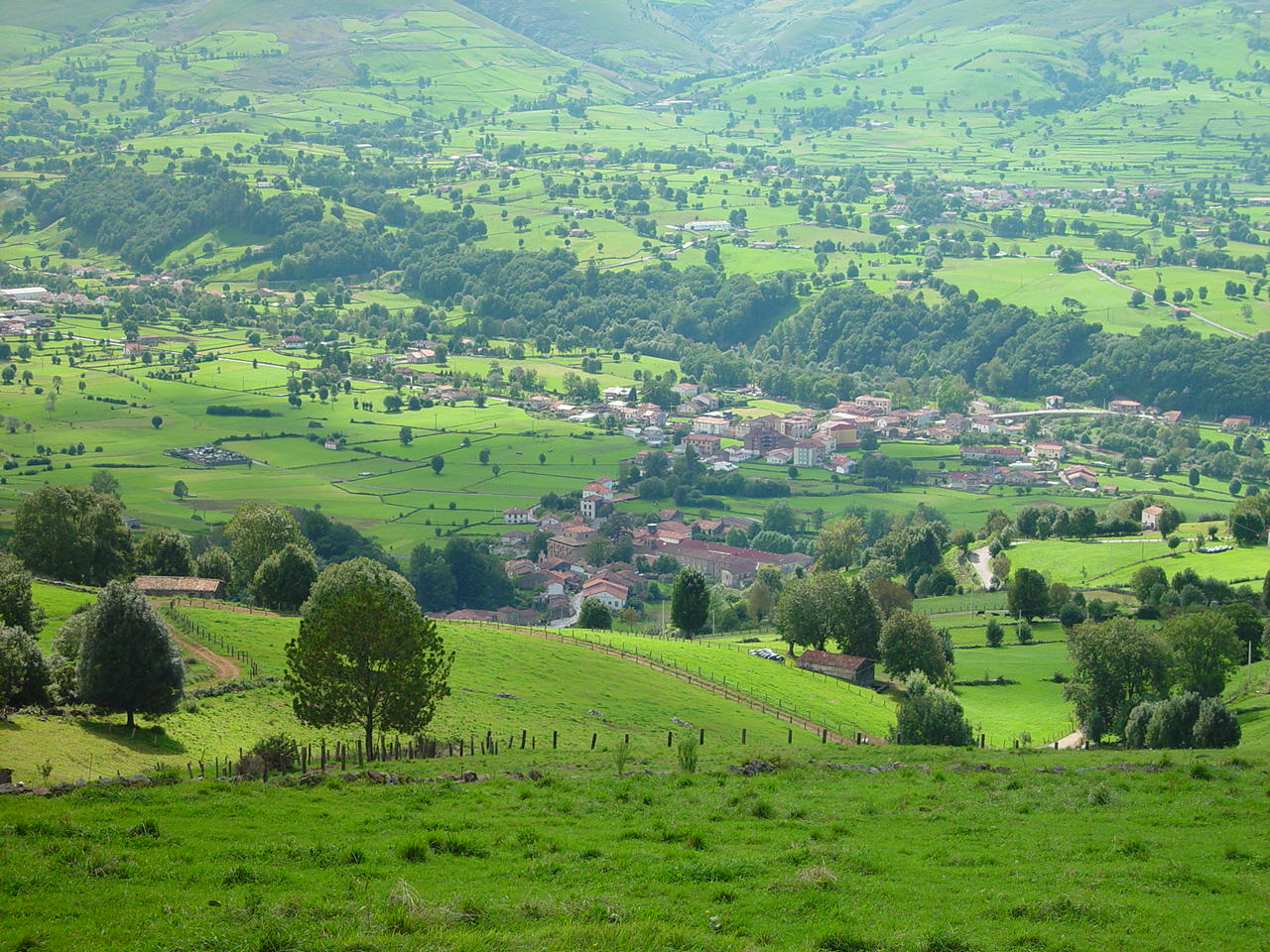
Panoramic view of the Carriedo valley in 2007, the first to return to royal manor status and the immediate antecedent of the Valleys lawsuit.

After the ruling of the Carriedo lawsuit, they decided to appeal to the monarchy the valleys of Alfoz de Lloredo, Cabezón, Cabuérniga, Camargo, Cayón, Penagos, Piélagos, Reocín and Villaescusa, part of the Asturias de Santillana, which belonged to the dukes of Infantado, also marquises of Santillana. The valleys presented their querencia in 1544 to the Duke of Infantado. Reocín and Cabuérniga were late possessions of the Duke, and Cabuérniga joined the lawsuit later, so they are sometimes not presented as complainantss. The valleys protested before the king saying that:

... the Councils and neighbors of the valleys of Camargo, Alfóz de Lloredo, Villaescusa, Cayón, Penagos, Piélagos, Cabezón and Riocín, declare that all the said valleys, places, Councils and neighbors, with their boundaries and mountains, pastures, pastures and vassals, high and low jurisdiction, civil and criminal, mere and mixed empire and the rents and taxes and rights with all the other things attached to the valleys, are royal and of the royal crown of your kingdoms and the royalty from sea to sea. And thus they could not and cannot separate, nor divide, nor depart from the said royal crown, free and exempt from all vassalage, nor any manorialism, not being vassals of the said duke nor being able to be by right, nor owing him, as they do not owe him vassalage, nor service, nor chest, nor right, nor any other tribute whatsoever. The said duke by force and not duly, has entered and occupied against all reason and justice the said valleys...

==== Sentence of 1553 ====
The first sentence (in degree of view), of 17 October 1553, was positive for the valleys, who achieved advances in matters of taxes and rents for the dukes, as well as considering the civil and criminal jurisdiction of their territory as royal right, returning it to the royal manor. This conclusion came when it was considered that the Mendozas had forced their power over the valleys, saying that they had obtained the favour of:

"the older relatives of the said valleys so that they would be his vassals, giving them many gifts and lay downs because they would have manners with the other minors so that they would receive them as such a lord."

— Ortiz Real, J.; Cantabria..., pp. 84-99.

This sentence did not grant validity to the documents presented by Íñigo López de Mendoza regarding his inheritance. The prosecutor Juan García even considered perjury more than fifty witnesses who testified in favor of the duke, who filed as many as four allegations.

==== Sentence of 1568 ====
The first sentence was appealed by the dukes, but in 1568 the previous sentence was confirmed.

==== Sentence of 1578 ====
In 1578, the Chancellery of Valladolid confirmed the return of civil and criminal jurisdiction to the mayors of the valleys. The valleys of Reocín and Cabuérniga—which had not been part of the manorialism until 1544—were included.

==== Sentence of 1581 ====
In 1581, the royal manor status of the valleys was confirmed for the last time and the construction of a province including them was fixed.

=== Province of the Nine Valleys ===
The direct consequences of the resolution of the conflict were the return of the valleys to the Castilian crown, integrated in 1589 the "Province of the Nine Valleys of the Asturias de Santillana", the recovery of the royal power and the reduction of the manorial power in the area. The new province was constituted in the Casa de juntas de Puente San Miguel, where in 1778 it was decided to integrate it into another province—province of Cantabria—which although short-lived is considered the political and historical origin of the current autonomous community.

The province of the Nine Valleys obtained privileges, among other monarchs, from Philip IV (1630), who allowed it to be governed by "ordinary mayors". This fact is the reason why 1630 is oftentimes considered the date for the creation of the province. Other times, the assumed date is 1581, the year in which the lawsuit ended. In 1645, the general ordinances of the province came into force, which were reformed in 1757.

== Arguments ==
=== Of the valleys ===
The Nine Valleys wanted to join the Carriedo lawsuit as a precedent and concentrated their arguments on the following points:

1. Justice. The dukes did not allow them to adopt mayors, merinos or other judicial positions, which forced them to always receive justice from the town of Santillana del Mar, controlled by the dukes themselves.
2. Security. The roads between the towns were not protected, which meant that travelers who had to go to Santillana were easily assaulted and even killed many times. The insecurity was increased by taking advantage of the lawsuits, so that those who had to go to Santillana died on the roads.
3. Economy. The dukes forced the peasants to pay tribute to pay for the administration of justice, which they complained about. They also imprisoned the rebellious council procurators.
4. Corruption. The dukes paid the scribes to have them at their disposal. In addition, the soldiers, to the orders of the dukes, taking advantage of the tension generated by the lawsuits, did not punish the violence, not even the murder, which caused the murder rate to increase.

=== Of the dukes ===
1. Rights. The Dukes of Infantado argued that the territories had belonged to the house of de la Vega for 100 years. They also claimed that in 1420, John II of Castile had given Leonor de la Vega confirmation of possession over the valleys, even though this was not exercised until 1448, when it was done by means of force.

== Reactions ==
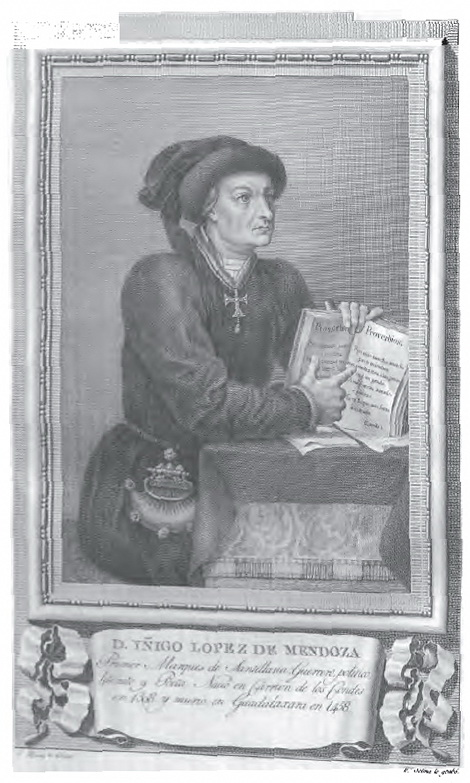
Íñigo López de Mendoza in an engraving of 1791.

=== Royalty ===
The royalty was happy to regain power in the north of the Iberian Peninsula, successively lost for three centuries. In addition to the creation of the province of the Nine Valleys, to which different kings were adding ordinances, the valley of Carriedo, antecedent of the Valleys lawsuit, received from the king the title of "Royal Valley of Carriedo."

=== Dukes of the Infantado ===
The response of the dukes was very violent. There are several testimonies about the atrocities committed by order of Íñigo López de Mendoza, his friends and followers before and during the years that the lawsuits lasted. Juan Martínez, witness in the lawsuit, assured that the duke had entered his valley surrounded by men with banners, atabals and trumpets and had made it surrender by force, making people and cattle flee to the mountains. Afterwards, he burned the houses and imposed punishments on those he could find. Pero Díaz and Juan de Matamorosa, opponents of the duke, had their houses burned and were thrown out of windows. Don Íñigo even mistreated hidalgo opponents related to the house de La Vega, and imprisoned one of them for eight months. When the Infantado finally lost the lawsuit of 1581, the contemporary duke decided to focus his attention on the last territories that were granted to him in other parts of the peninsula.

== Memorial ==
The name of the document of the lawsuit, printed in 1566, is Memorial contra las escrituras que el fiscal y valles presentan por autos de jurisdicción (English: "Memorial against the deeds filed by the prosecutor and valleys for writs of jurisdiction"). In it are contained documents of previous lawsuits against the same noble family, being one, for example, from 1398, prior to the "Old lawsuit"; another of the attached documents dates from 1351. In 1910, the Jurisdiction of Cantabria published it under the title Memorial presentado al Rey por el Duque del Infantado en el pleito sostenido contra el Fiscal y los 7 valles de Villaescusa, Cayón, Penagos, Camargo, Cabezón, Alfoz de Lloredo y Piélagos. (English: "Memorial presented to the King by the Duke of Infantado in the lawsuit against the Prosecutor and the 7 valleys of Villaescusa, Cayón, Penagos, Camargo, Cabezón, Alfoz de Lloredo and Piélagos").

The documentation of the lawsuit, lost, was recovered on 8 February 1957, when the journalist and writer Antonio Bartolomé Suárez discovered the original documents in a house in Reocín, where a family was preserving them. Manuel Bartolomé García, Antonio's son, was appointed in 2016 Escribano de la Merindad de las Asturias de Santillana, in recognition of his literary career and collaboration to the history of the Nine Valleys; appointment supported by all the representatives of the Nine Valleys in the Casa de Juntas of Puente San Miguel on the Institutions Day

The memorial as a whole has numerous additions and documents that give a good sample of the state of La Marina since the beginning of the 14th century, among them the Apeo de Pero Alfonso de Escalante.

=== Manorial places of the valleys ===
The memorial of the lawsuit has been studied in reference to the history of Cantabria for including a list of the towers and fortresses that contained the eight valleys (not including Carriedo). In total there are 43 towers and 2 fortresses, in addition to the Castle of Pedraja, quite a number of fortifications for such a small territory. It is believed that in the 16th century there were in the whole of Asturias de Santillana more than 200 towers and fortresses along with more than 1000 hidalgo plots, as mentioned in the memorial. The following table shows the contribution of Fernando José de Velasco y Ceballos, who associated some of the towers cited to possible lineages.

Towers and fortresses cited in the memorial
Valley	Towers and lineages
Villaescusa	Liaño tower (Liaño); La Concha tower (de la Concha); Obregón tower (Obregón); Villanueva tower (Ceballos).
Cayón-Penagos	Totero tower; La Penilla tower; Tahulú tower (Ceballos Escalante).
Camargo	Estaños tower; Maliaño tower (Herrera); Orozco family tower in Escobedo (Escobedo); four towers in Igollo (Portas _{[Disputed]}); Herrera tower (Herrera).
Piélagos	Cianca tower (Ceballos); two towers in Quijano (Quijano); Renedo tower (Ceballos _{[Disputed]}); Zurita tower (Ceballos); Rueda fortress (Ceballos, later Sánchez de Tagle); three towers in Oruña, Arce tower (Ceballos Escalante); Liencres castle (House de la Vega).
Cabuérniga	Sancho de los Ríos tower; tower in Terán (Terán); Valle tower (Díaz Cossío _{[Disputed]}); Ucieda tower (Terán _{[Disputed]}); tower in Sopeña (Díaz de Cossío), tower in Ruente (Mier y Terán).
Alfoz de Lloredo	Comillas fortress (House de la Vega); Ruiseñada tower (Bracho); Udías tower (Ceballos); Cubillas tower (Villegas _{[Disputed]}), tower in Trasierra (Villegas); tower in Castro (Villegas); tower in Nuño (Villegas).
Reocín	Quijas tower (Bustamante); tower in Quijas (Calderón); tower in Ibio (Guerra); tower in Cabezón de la Sal (House de la Vega); tower in Cos (House de la Vega); tower in Santibáñez (Gayón); tower next to the Agüera river (Agüeros, after the Peredo family).

== See also ==
- Cantabria
- Defensive towers of Cantabria
- Asturias de Santillana

== Additional bibliography ==
- Escafedo, M. (1917). La Casa de la Vega. Comentarios a las behetrías montañesas y al pleito de los valles (in Spanish). Torrelavega.
- González de la Vega, Rogelio; Pérez; Bustamante (1989). El pleito de los valles, las juntas de Puente San Miguel y el origen de la Provincia de Cantabria (in Spanish) (1 ed.). Santander: J. Bedia. ISBN 8472690334.
- Pérez-Bustamante (1994). El Pleito de los valles (in Spanish). Santander.
