= Defensive towers of Cantabria =

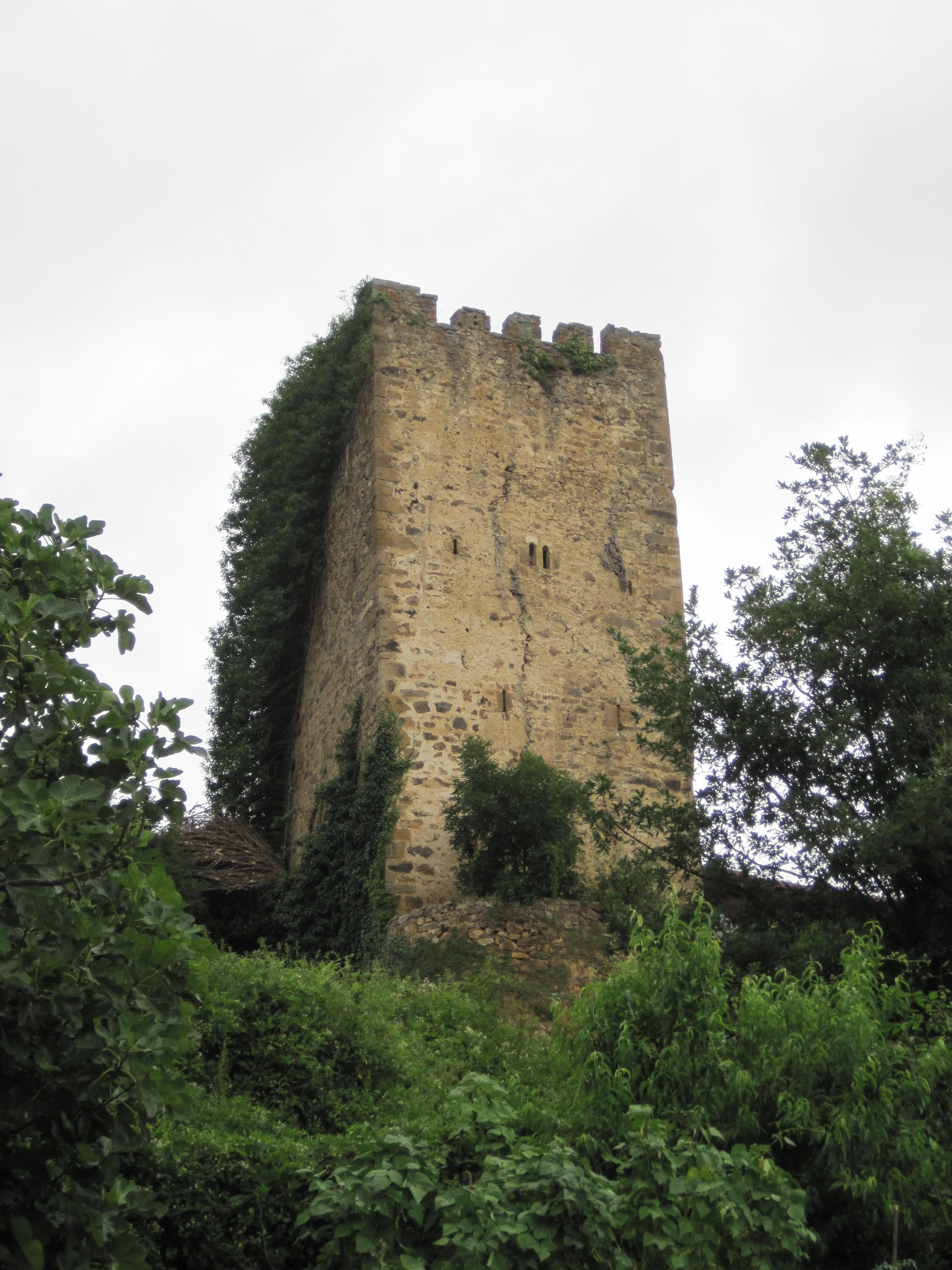
Tower of Mogrovejo.

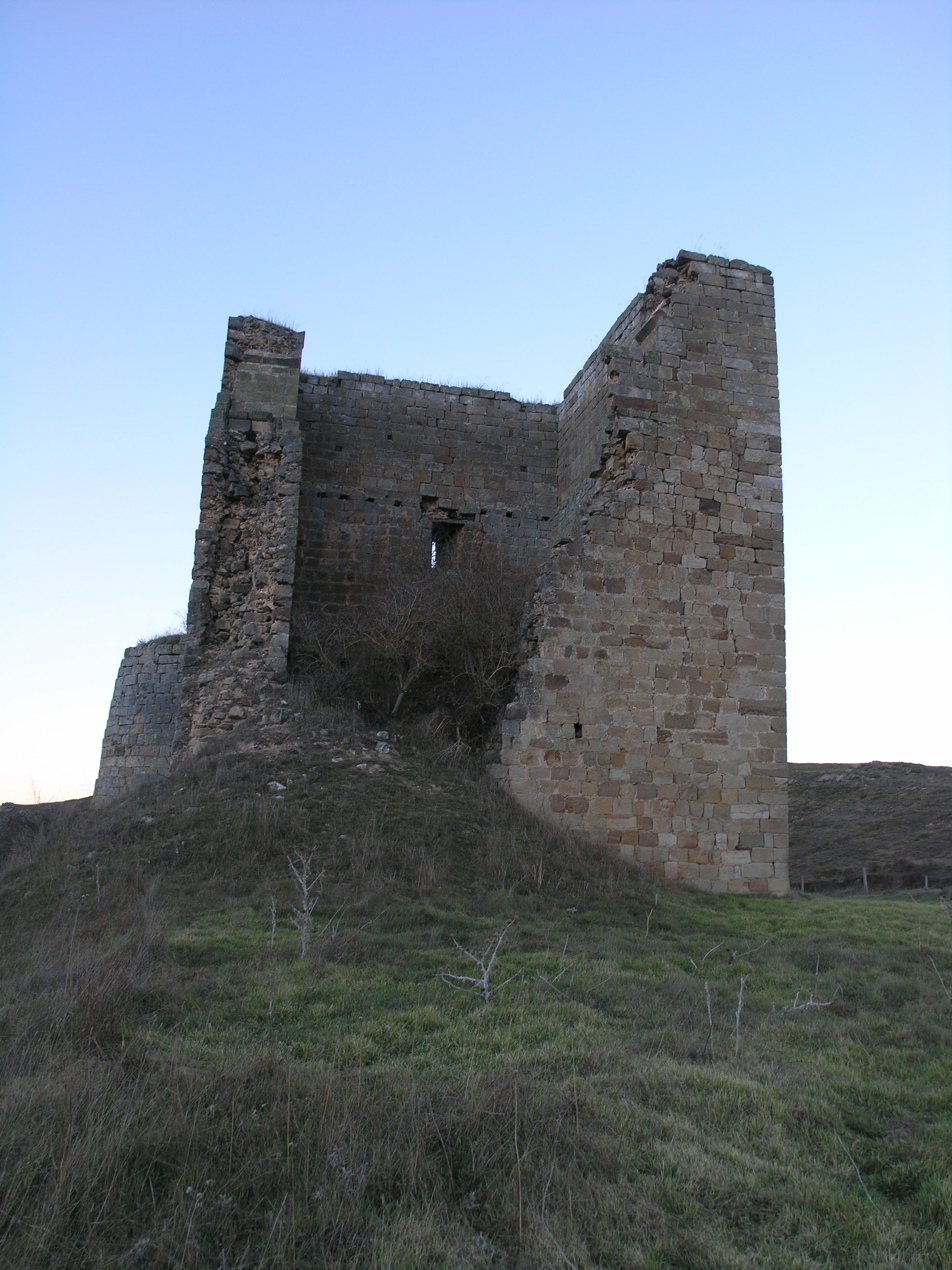
Tower of Ruerrero.

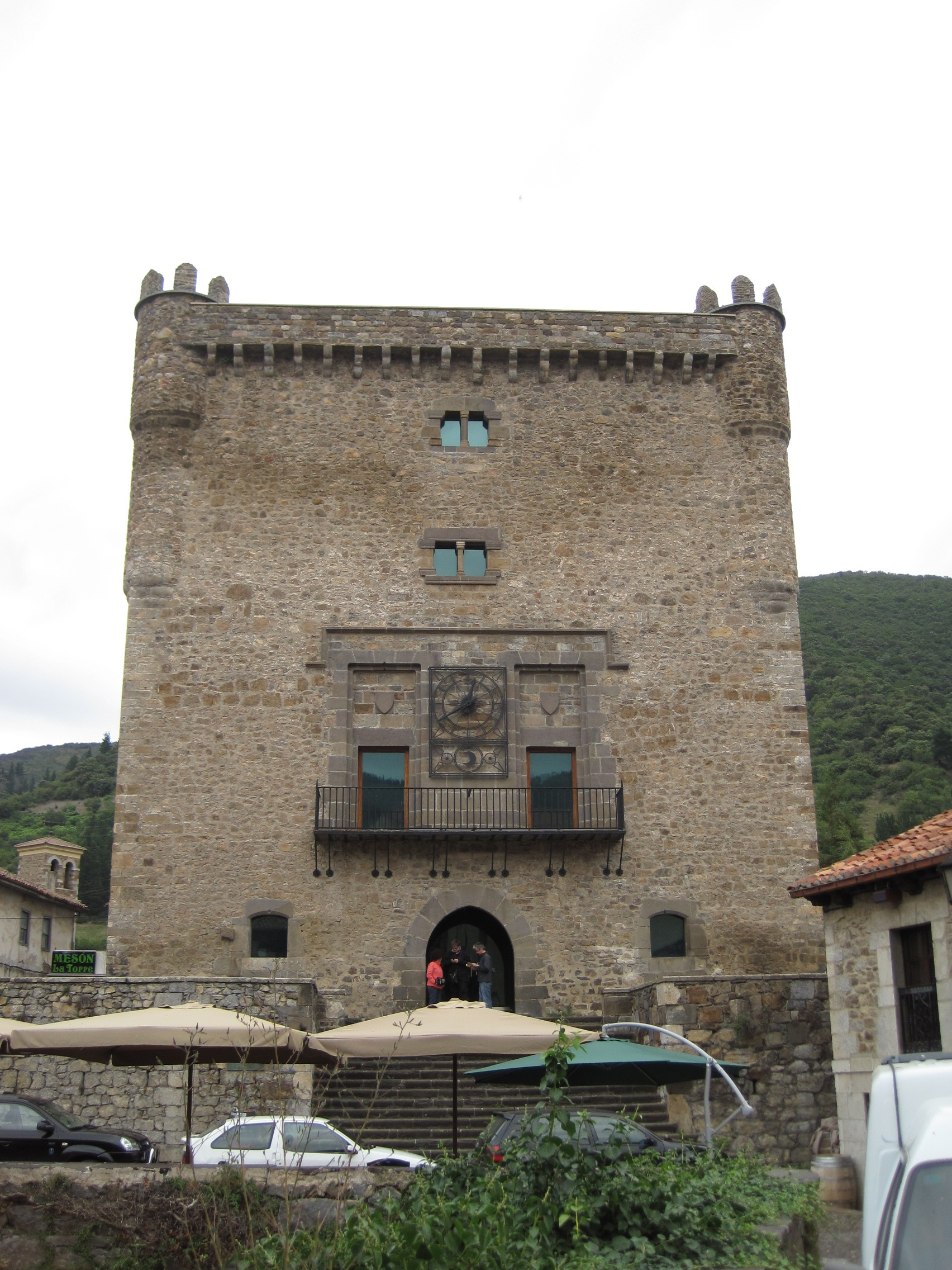
Tower del Infantado.

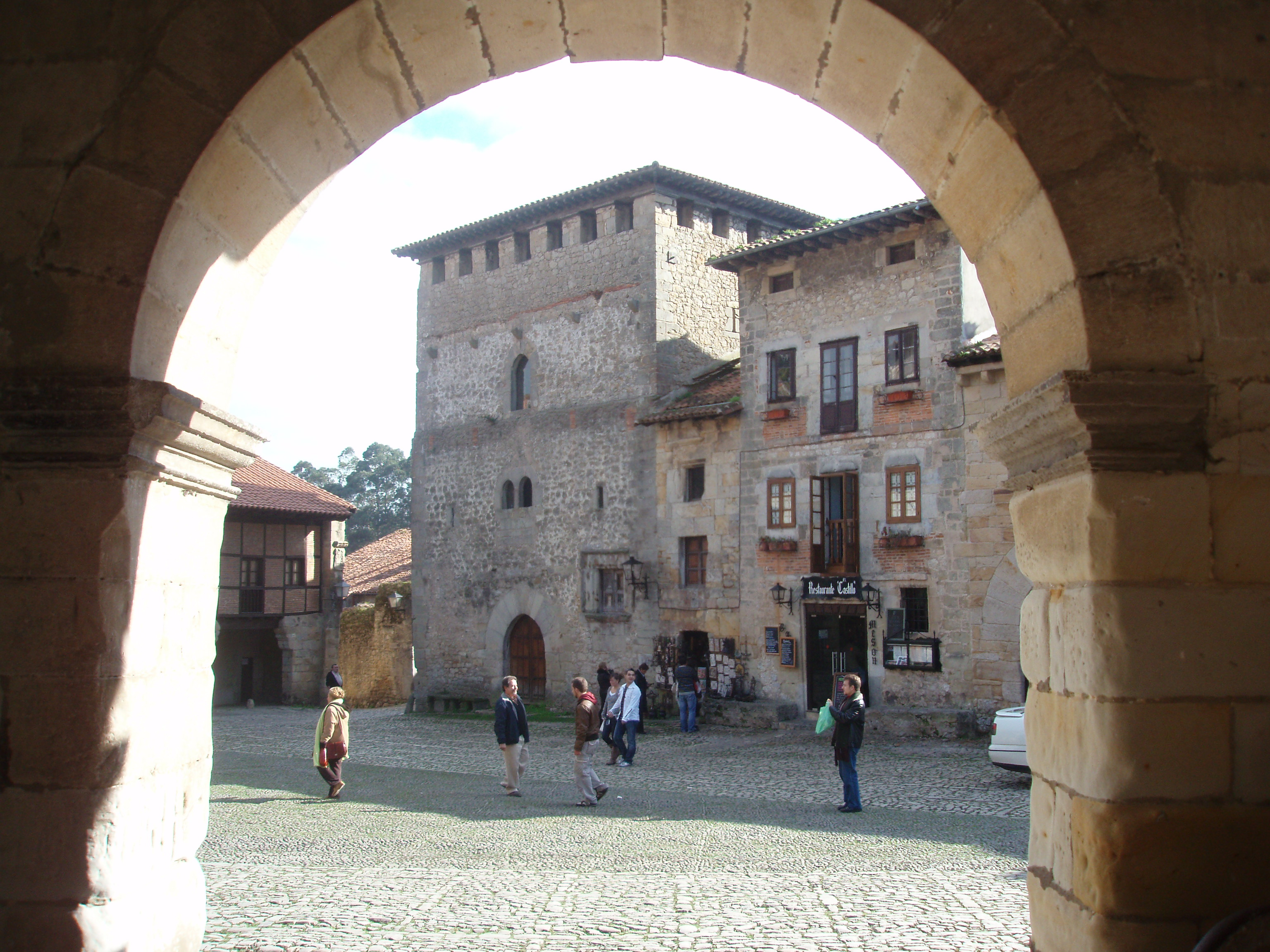
Tower del Merino.

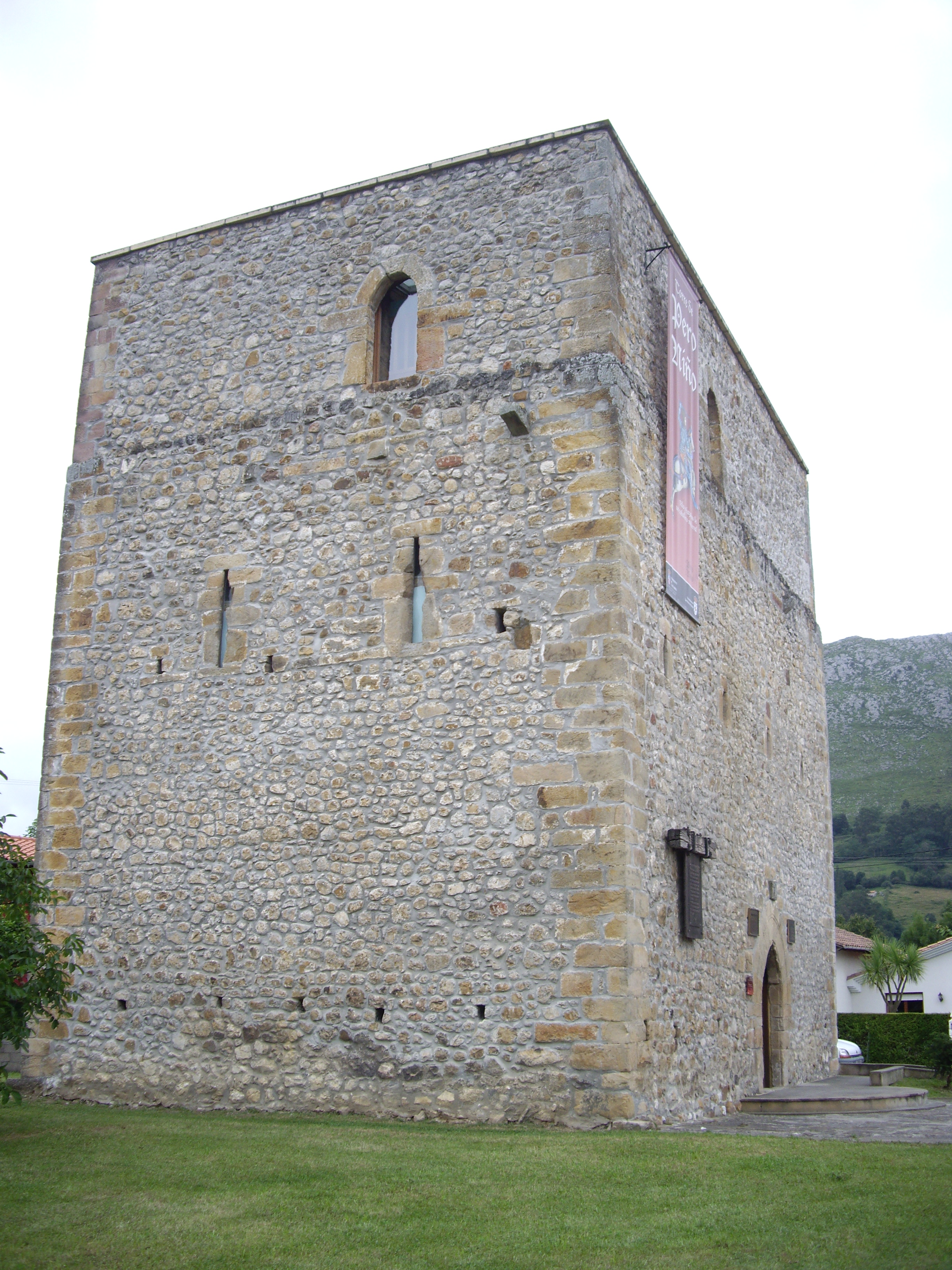
Tower of Pero Niño.

In Cantabria, there is a large number of fortified towers that fulfilled functions of housing and defense. These buildings, generally battlements, were erected mostly between the 13th and 15th centuries by noble families and influenced significantly the architecture of Cantabria, passing some to be fort-houses, a prelude to the future casona montañesa. A curious fact is that there are no circular towers in the region (except in some churches), unlike in the neighboring community of Asturias. Today, most of the towers that remain are either in ruins or have been drastically altered.

The towers and castles that appear in medieval documents as castellum were very popular both as fortresses and as residences of nobles, mayors and lords. They eventually became widespread in the lower valleys of Cantabria, built on hills and within towns. One of the best examples of urban towers that gave rise to new settlements was the now-disappeared Torre de la Vega, the origin of Torrelavega.

The defensive towers of Cantabria, due to their architectural features, can only be compared with those of Enkarterri, a neighboring comarca of Biscay.

== Evolution of the Cantabrian towers ==
=== High medieval fortifications ===
In the territory currently occupied by Cantabria, three stages of medieval military architecture can be distinguished. The first, around the 7th and 12th centuries, is documented by about twenty sites that correspond with small castles, presumably linked to respective alfozes, and are the first organization in the Cantabrian territory that are not monastic in nature. These castles are arranged in high places, easily defensible and often visible to each other. At the end of the stage, the new castles, related to the founding of the four villas (Castro Urdiales, Santander, Laredo and San Vicente de la Barquera), are more complex and are located in the same urban centers. Successively renovatedand staged centuries later in the third phase, the walls around the villas were constructed.

From 13th century, with the gradual increase of feudal power appearing across Cantabria and a large number of fortified towers covered the entire territory. These are still preserved through several preservation and restoration works. In the late Middle Ages, the only instance of an interior castle in Cantabria was Castle of Argüeso.

=== The medieval tower ===
On low medieval stage family fortifications dotted the Cantabrian geography with buildings designed to defend the coast and protect against the war of the bands. Isolated towers built between the late 12th century and early 15th met certain military functions and served as watchtowers over the territory. Many of these fortifications were Gothic in style but did not show up in urban centers.

Many had common features such as square plants and walls of masonry with reinforcements of ashlar, narrow windows and mullions or ensaetadas that usually adorned a single entry with wood floors. Commonly, they had three to four floors, with services like the cellar and salting area in the basement, a banquet and reception hall at the first floor and stately premises on upper floors. The main staircase was located near the entrance and was usually made of wood. Each floor was free of divisions except for the tapestries that hid the lord's bed. No traces of partitions were found during excavation. Some possessed walls surrounded by a pit. In some cases, virtually all walls were made of masonry. The entrance was often a lowered arch flanked by loopholes; inside, a staircase beside it with two sections per floor that attached to the front progresses. The overall volume had few voids and created a heavy atmosphere. Decor was virtually nonexistent, but the fortifications were normally topped by battlements. Inside, there was open walls near the window, with a bench, adn was covered by a segmental arch.

The inner structure consisted of a central wooden trunk holding a large wooden beam on each floor, this was then covered by masonry between it and the stone walls. Sometimes, an inner wall of masonry was built, replacing the wooden pillar.

In some cases, few of these towers were surrounded by a high barbican that made them seem like castles in the style of Álava. The presumed existence of these defense systems (ramparts, moats, countermoats, corbels, etc.) marked the typological difference of the towers.

=== The tower-house ===
The stately fortresses kept to the medieval styles until the 16th century. During the 16th century, these towers were expanded upon to make manors or small palaces. These houses were still built in the Gothic tradition of cubic volume, were developed in height and had owned more open fields surrounding them than the then modern palaces. From the 16th century, the union of the Catholic Monarchs brought a longer period of peace in the region. This lead the towers to decline in military function, but were still being built and preserved as a sign of stately power. This led to the building of typical tower-houses of Cantabria as some existing watchtowers were expanded or modified.

The evolution resulted in the 18th century casona montañesa, a typical example of a Cantabrian palace. Some Baroque palaces, such as of Soñanes, were built respecting the ruins of existing ancient medieval towers.

Destruction of the tower houses

It is known that king Henry IV of Castile had the Tower of Arce built in 1403. Largely speculated but ultimately false rumors were that other towers were demolished by order of the Catholic Monarchs, such as those in Gipuzkoa and Galicia. In truth, in 1437, Henry IV began a campaign to tear down castles, fortresses and tower-houses that were built with no royal license. The tower houses of Gipuzkoa were ordered demolished in the year 1457, and in 1500, Isabella and Ferdinand continued that legacy.

The following is a list of towers, fortified towers and tower-houses (fortified houses) of Cantabria built between the 12th and 17th centuries. Not listed are castles of the region castle here refers to the popular name, and does not refer to the proper name of the fortification.

Defensive towers of Cantabria Built between the 12th and 16th centuries
Image	Name	Century	Municipality	Figure of protection	Notes
	Tower of Cabanzón	12th century	Herrerías	Well of cultural interest (1992)	Has barbican quite well preserved, high and with loopholes. It is demolished the top.
	Tower-house of the Calderón de La Barca	12th century	Santillana del Mar	Well of local interest (2002)	Ancient medieval tower transformed into a tower house. Owned pit and Barbican.
	Castle of Agüero	13th century	Marina de Cudeyo	Law 16/1985	Wide and lowest form, which earned it the name of the castle, although are not fit to the Castilians.
	Tower of Mogrovejo	13th century	Camaleño	Well of cultural interest (1985)	Medieval tower then transformed tower-house, with perimeter wall.
	Castle of Montehano	13th century	Escalante	Well of cultural interest (1993)	Had barbican and blind towers at the corners.
	Tower of Estrada	13th century	Val de San Vicente		It has wall and chapel.
	Tower of Carrejo	13th century	Cabezón de la Sal	Well of cultural interest (1984)	Transformed into palace in the 18th century. Today is the Museum of Nature of Cantabria.
	Tower of Proaño	13th century	Brotherhood of Campoo de Suso	Well of cultural interest (¿?)	
	Tower La Guerra	13th century	Mazcuerras		Converted into tower-house in the 15th century and later extensively renovated.
	Tower of las Henestrosas	13th century	Valdeolea	Law 16/1985	Tower converted then into castle.
	Tower of Hojamarta	13th century	Reocín	Well of cultural interest (1982)	Beside was built the palace of the Bustamante of Quijas.
	Tower of Quijas	13th century	Reocín		
	Tower of Velo		Piélagos		Big tower located in the town of Puente Arce.
	Tower of Venero		Arnuero	Law 16/1985	Rebuilt one of its walls that was collapsed.
	Tower of Cabrahigo	14th century	Arnuero	Well of cultural interest (1992)	
	Castle of Allendelagua	14th century	Castro Urdiales	Law 16/1985	Only remain the startups of the walls.
	Tower of Gajano	14th century	Marina de Cudeyo		Renovated in the 16th century. Has a skylight of 19th.
	Tower del Condestable		Colindres	Law 16/1985	A palace was built around the tower thus became an integral part thereof.
	Tower del Infantado	14th century	Potes	Well of cultural interest (1983)	
	Tower of Pero Niño	14th century	San Felices de Buelna	Well of cultural interest (1983)	
	Tower del Merino	14th century	Santillana del Mar		
	Tower of Ruerrero	14th century	Valderredible	Well of cultural interest (1992)	Are preserved remains of a moat. It has a cylindrical body as an abutment.
	Tower of San Martín de Hoyos	14th century	Valdeolea	Well of cultural interest (¿2004?)	
	Tower del Pontón	14th century	Peñarrubia		The exterior retains full.
	Tower of la Vega	14th century	Comillas	Ley 16/1985	Restored.
	Tower of don Beltrán de la Cueva	15th century (or 16th century)	Santillana del Mar	Well of cultural interest (1981)	Leads attached a palace.
	Tower of los Velasco	15th century	Soba	Well of cultural interest (1992)	
	Tower of San Martín de la Arena	15th century	Suances		
	Tower of Don Borja	15th century	Santillana del Mar		It was probably built on an earlier medieval tower.
	Towers of Bores	15th century	Vega de Liébana		Two similar towers along the way to the neighborhood of Campo (Bores). One of them is fairly well preserved, while the other missing parts and threatens ruin.
	Tower of los Bustamante	15th century	Campoo de Yuso	Well of cultural interest (1985)	Two nearby similar towers were demolished in the 18th century by threatening ruin.
	Tower of Terán	15th century	Cabuérniga		Restored.
	Torreón of Cartes	15th century	Cartes	Well of cultural interest (1985)	
	Tower of Orejón de la Lama	15th century	Potes		Located in the neighborhood of Sol. Three levels and relatively good conservation.
	Tower of Villegas	15th century	Santiurde de Toranzo	Well of cultural interest (1992)	Renaissance fortified house.
	Tower-house of los Alvarado	16th century	Medio Cudeyo		
	Tower of Cadalso	16th century	Valderredible	Well of cultural interest (1992)	
	Tower of los Barreda	16th century	Suances		Located in Cortiguera, formerly it belonged to a missing fortress.
	Tower of los Ezquerra	16th century	Soba		
	Tower of Gómez de Bárcena	16th century	San Miguel de Aguayo		Good condition.
	Tower of Hoz	16th century	Laredo	Law 16/1985	
	Tower-house of los Zorrilla	16th century	Soba		
	Tower of Pronillo		Santander	Law 16/1985	Transformed into a palace in the middle of 16th century.
	Tower-house of Riva Herrera	16th century	Marina de Cudeyo	Well of cultural interest (1992)	
	Tower-house of Ruiz Bustamante	17th century	Corvera de Toranzo	Historic and artistic complex (1985)	
	Tower of Agüero	17th century	Corvera de Toranzo	Law 16/1985	Two-storey building added later. Good condition.
	Tower-house of Bustamente Rueda	17th century	Corvera de Toranzo		Historic and artistic complex (1985)
	Tower of Caviedes	18th century	Valdáliga		Existed in Caviedes another tower of the 13th century, now defunct.
	Tower of Acereda	Unknown	Santiurde de Toranzo		Totally ruined. It was destroyed in the 15th century by the Marquis of Aguilar de Campoo and Count of Castañeda Garci Fernández Manrique.
	Tower of Barriomonte		Guriezo	Law 16/1985	
	Tower of Berdeja		Peñarrubia		Only remain the foundations.
	Tower of Carasa		Voto	Law 16/1985	
	Tower of Ceballos		Corvera de Toranzo		
	Castle of Cobejo		Molledo		
	Tower of Cos		Mazcuerras		
	Tower of Donadío		Selaya		Medieval tower embedded in a construction of 18th century for conversion into palace.
	Tower of Espina		Ampuero	Law 16/1985	
	Tower of Hoznayo		Entrambasaguas	Law 16/1985	
	Tower of Jado		Argoños		Law 16/1985
	Tower of Mazcuerras		Mazcuerras	Law 16/1985	
	Tower of Otañes		Castro Urdiales	Ley 16/1985	Have annexed old buildings in two of its sides, making tower-house.
	Tower of Penagos		Penagos	Law 16/1985	
	Tower of Piedrahita		Peñarrubia		Only preserves some canvases of walls.
	Tower del Rebollar		Arnuero		Law 16/1985
	Tower of Roiz		Valdáliga		
	Tower of Rubín de Celis		Rionansa		
	Tower of Ruente		Ruente		Converted into hotel.
	Tower of San Miguel de Aguayo		San Miguel de Aguayo	Law 16/1985	
	Torre de San Telmo		Suances	Law 16/1985	Only preserved part of two of its walls.
	Tower of Secadura		Voto	Law 16/1985	
	Tower of los Señores de Isla		Arnuero		
	Tower of Treto		Bárcena de Cicero	Law 16/1985	
	Tower of Velo		Piélagos	Well of cultural interest (1983)	Medieval tower extended and fenced to make it palace compound during the 16th and 17th centuries, located in Renedo.
	Tower of la Villa		Marina de Cudeyo	Law 16/1985	
	Tower of Villacarriedo		Villacarriedo	Well of cultural interest	Now part of the Palace of Soñanes, which is building in around him, preserving it.
	Tower of Villapresente		Reocín		
	Castle of Villegas		Alfoz de Lloredo		
	Castle of Vispieres		Santillana del Mar	Law 16/1985	Remains of a fortified tower built on Roman and Castro ruins.
	Tower of Zurita		Piélagos	Law 16/1985	

== See also ==
- Cantabria
- Nine Valleys lawsuit

== Bibliography ==
- Fortified towers of Cantabria
