= Hermandad de las Cuatro Villas =

Commercial routes and fisheries of the Brotherhood of the Four Cities.

The Hermandad of the Cuatro Villas de la Costa de la Mar ('Brotherhood of the Four Cities'), also cited under the name Cuatro Villas de la Costa de Cantabria, was a medieval and modern administrative entity that grouped the coastal cities of the north of the kingdom of Castile, all of them part of present-day Cantabria; namely, from west to east: San Vicente de la Barquera, Santander, Laredo, and Castro-Urdiales. At the end of the 15th century, it became part of the corregimiento of the Cuatro Villas along with other territories in the north of the Iberian Peninsula. In 1514 the province was renamed the corregimiento de las Tres Villas de la Costa, by separation from the town of San Vicente, which rejoined in 1521. Towns twinned since the 13th century, its foundation as a corregimiento dates back to the reign of the Catholic Monarchs, around 1496, surviving until its inclusion in the province of Cantabria in 1778.

They formed a naval and commercial power of the first order at the service of the kingdom of Castile and their economic importance was such that together with the brotherhood of the Marismas (of which the Basque seafaring towns also formed part) they stopped the expansion of the Hanseatic League towards the south of the Atlantic Arc. As a corregimiento, they constituted the largest and most important historical administrative entity of those that preceded the current autonomous community of Cantabria and as a brotherhood, from the mid-15th century to the mid-16th century, they absorbed 40% of all commercial activity generated in the Iberian Cantabrian Sea. The Cuatro Villas was also, together with the town of Santillana del Mar, the only urban fabric of the region in the Middle Ages, whose structure was eminently rural until the 19th century.

== Extension ==
The Hermandad de las Cuatro Villas included the towns of Castro-Urdiales, Laredo, Santander, and San Vicente de la Barquera, as well as a territory around them that included several villages and fields. The brotherhood, from the end of the 15th century, was registered in the corregimiento de las Cuatro Villas de la Costa del Mar, with headquarters first in each of the towns and later centralized in Laredo. The corregimiento included most of present-day Cantabria and small parts of what are now the provinces of Burgos and Asturias. Specifically, the corregimiento included, in addition to the four towns and their municipalities, the valleys of Peñamellera and Rivadedeva (present-day Asturias), the valleys of Tudela, Mena, and nearby towns (Burgos), the merindad of Trasmiera and its twin towns of Santoña, Argoños, and Escalante, the royal valleys of Liendo, Guriezo, the councils of the board of Parayas, and the royal valleys of the Asturias de Santillana, separated from the duchy of Infantado after the lawsuit of the Nine Valleys.

In 1511, San Vicente de la Barquera and Peñamellera formed their corregimiento, although in 1521 they were once again included in that of the Cuatro Villas. Previously, the town had asked the king, in 1517, not to appoint any more corregidores, after the economic difficulties it experienced after suffering several fires. Castro-Urdiales separated from the corregimiento between 1739 and 1763, being part of the lordship of Vizcaya for several of those years. The Asturias de Santillana separated from the Cuatro Villas in 1674 when Carlos II created the corregimiento of the same name to avoid dissensions between the valleys. The Asturias de Santillana was reintegrated into the Cuatro Villas in 1678 because of the economic cost of maintaining the new corregidor.

== History ==
=== The new coastal urban structure (1163–1296) ===
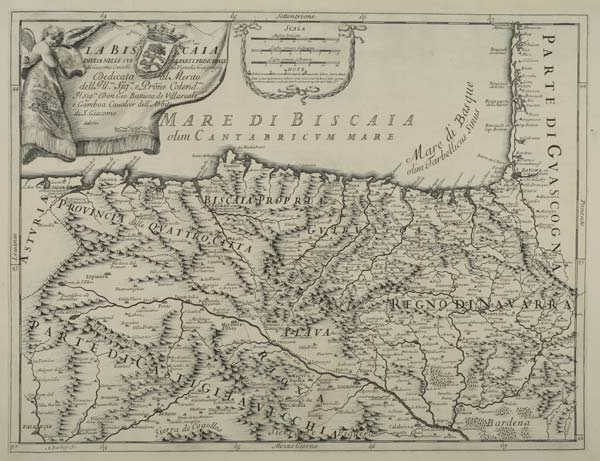
Mare di Biscaia in 1696 by the cartographer Giacomo Cantelli da Vignola.

At the end of the 12th century, the seafaring towns of what is now Cantabria were the only ports available to the Kingdom of Castile. At that time, the Castilian King Alfonso VIII (1158–1214), who was traveling through these lands, granted several charters that gave commercial advantages, among other freedoms, to Castro-Urdiales in 1163, Santander in 1187, Laredo in 1200 and San Vicente de la Barquera in 1210, to project Castilian trade towards the maritime trade routes. The four towns thus obtained the status of cities and began to take off in terms of population and economy. With the foundation of these cities, the only ones in the Kingdom of Castile from its separation from León in 1157 until the annexation of Guipúzcoa and Duranguesado around 1200, the royalty secured control of a coastline adjacent to lands closely controlled by nobles and abbots. As direct effects, the new cities created the first urban structure of Cantabria since the fall of the Roman Empire and the Castilian kings shifted part of their attention to La Montaña and not only to the borders of the Reconquest. Between the 9th and 11th centuries, the coastline was not safe due to Viking and Muslim incursions.

The privileges they received were similar to those of Sahagún and Logroño. All the towns were founded on pre-existing populations, and inhabited as urban centers until the 6th century. Santander has proven Roman remains and Castro-Urdiales, Roman, and even pre-Roman. Documentarily and archaeologically, the populations vanished between the 6th and 11th centuries, when the villages linked to the monasteries that Alfonso VIII found in the following century appeared.

The four cities became famous in 1248 because their ships were the majority in the fleet with which Ferdinand III of Castile conquered Seville. Santander deserved special congratulations, one of whose ships destroyed the chains of the Triana bridge. The king gave the town its coat of arms, obliged Seville to pay it a periodic amount of maravedis, and rebuilt its collegiate church, now a cathedral. This feat has been recorded in the heraldry of both the city and the coat of arms of Cantabria.

They also participated in other conflicts of the time, such as the conquest of Tarifa (1339) and the battle of Rochela (1372).

It is difficult to know the power of the four cities around the 13th century, although the data available today suggest that it was great. For example, the fiscal documents of 1293 show that the four cities had collected more than twice as much money as the Guipuzcoan ports, Santander being the one that had collected the most, with 46% of the total. At the end of the 13th century, Alfonso X the Wise practiced a policy of commercial exemptions in the urban centers to generate wealth in them. The Cuatro Villas was the most benefited of the whole kingdom, thanks to the protectionist measures on its star products: wine, salt, and iron. However, this type of measure caused the king an aristocratic revolt in 1272. These measures exempted Santander from the portage tax in 1253 in a certain locality and from 1255, throughout the kingdom except Seville and Murcia, which San Vicente de la Barquera had already had since 1241, except for the portage of Toledo. That same year Laredo and Castro-Urdiales obtained privileges of exemption in Medina de Pomar, through which most of the goods of the time passed between the sea and the interior; in addition, Laredo obtained the same exemption as Santander and the right of fishing and salting at any point in the kingdoms of Galicia, León, and Castile. Santander was exempted in 1263 from taxes in the fairs of Valladolid, in 1276 from the royal tithes on salt, and in 1281 from those of its wine harvest. As proof of its importance, three of the four towns (except San Vicente) are mentioned in 1268 among the eighteen most important merchandise ports of the kingdom in a document of the Cortes de Jerez. (Note: In current terms, two Basque (San Sebastián and Fuenterrabía), three Cantabrian (Castro-Urdiales, Laredo, and Santander), one Asturian (Avilés), and twelve Galician (La Coruña, Ribadeo, Vivero, Betanzos, Ortigueira, Cedeira, Ferrol, Bayona, La Guardia, Pontevedra, Padrón and Noya).)

No less important than the land jurisdiction and privileges was the concession that the Castilian kings made to the cities. They gave them common jurisdiction over the sea from the Tina Mayor estuary to Ontón, as well as over the rivers that flowed between these points and their banks. The influence over this territory, which caused the growth of the villas at the same time as the anger of the medieval lords who previously controlled it, must have caused between the reigns of Alfonso VIII and Alfonso X the walling of the towns and the development of urban models planned for their expansion.

=== Hermandad de las Marismas (1296–1490) ===
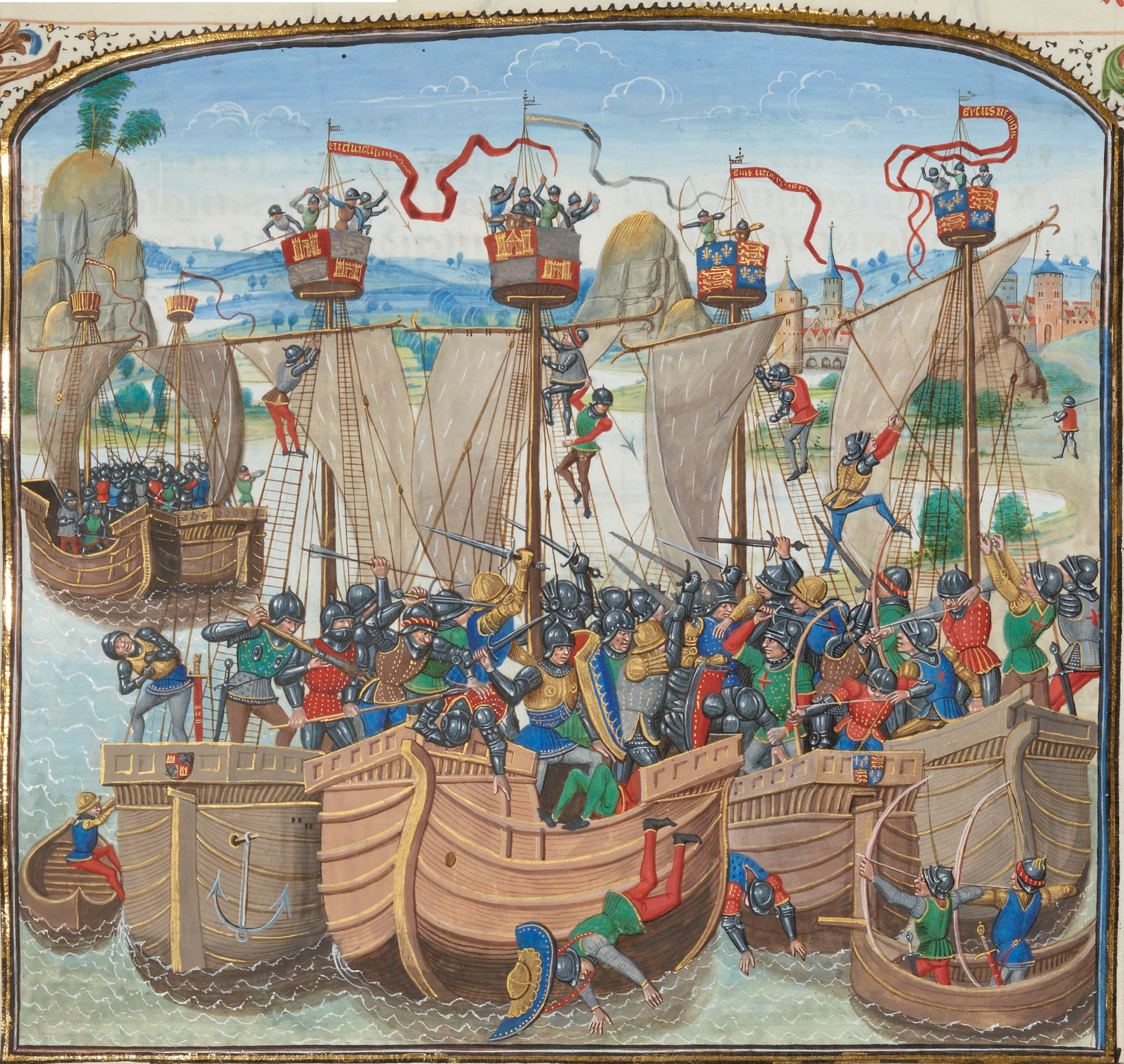
Naval Battle of La Rochelle (15th-century French miniature). In it the Castilian fleet, formed by Cantabrian ships, obtains a resounding victory against the English navy, passing the control of the English Channel to the hands of Castile.

The four cities joined Vitoria and several Basque ports on May 4, 1296, forming the Brotherhood of the Marshes, a dynamic institution that maintained commercial relations with some of the most important port cities throughout Europe and survived the other brotherhoods of the same territorial scope, which emerged from 1295 onwards. Although it was constituted in Castro-Urdiales, the town that became its capital, in 1296, its de facto brotherhood is earlier. This brotherhood, diluted in 1490, followed the example of the Hanseatic League and, according to historians such as Fernando García de Cortázar, was an international power. It included the ports of San Vicente de la Barquera, Santander, Laredo, Castro-Urdiales, Guetaria, Bermeo, Fuenterrabía, San Sebastián, and the town of Vitoria. By 1342 the brotherhood had expanded to include eighteen towns. (Note: A nombre de Dios e de Santa María. Sepan cuantos esta carta vieren como nos, los concejos de Santander, e de Laredo, e de Castro dordiales, e de Vitoria, e de Bermeo, e de Guetaria, e de Sant Sebastián, e de Fuent arrabia, a servicio de Dios, e de nuestro senor don Ferrando, facemos hermandat e uno, e la hermandat es esta (...)) The brotherhood had sufficient power to legislate itself, sign treaties with cities all over Europe and even with the king of England without the intercession of the kings of Castile, although it was subordinate to the kingdom and, in the case of the treaty with the king of England, Alfonso XI gladly supported the proposal. This freedom allowed the port towns to make peace with ports belonging to states at war with Spain, so that trade was not interrupted. The presence of the town of Vitoria - a former seat - in the brotherhood ensured the control of a trade route that, thanks to the creation of a series of towns in the mid-13th century, linked the plateau with the Basque Coast, passing through Vitoria. The coastal towns used this route to export wool from Castile and import manufactured goods from France and Flanders.

Thus, the Hundred Years' War benefited trade between the towns and several other European ports, especially with Bruges, which imported wool from Castile for the development of a powerful textile industry. Dieppe, Harfleur, and Rouen also stood out, although at a different level. The trade of the Cantabrian and Basque towns with the Netherlands and France rivaled that of the English and Hanseatic ships.

During this period, the commercial power of the towns grew, and wealthy oligarchies began to emerge, representing the people before the king and obtaining royal recognition. The antecedents of this class are present in the middle of the 13th century.

=== Corregimiento de las Cuatro Villas de la Mar de Cantabria (1494–1778) ===
At the time of the Catholic Monarchs, who reformed the entire Castilian institutional system, the brotherhood of the Marismas disappeared. The four Cantabrian towns were then united in the corregimiento de las Cuatro Villas, with initial headquarters, tax collection, and militia regiment in Laredo, the capital that was long disputed by Santander. These villas were governed by juntas (councils) until their inclusion in the province of Cantabria in 1778 when the corregimiento disappeared. In 1477 the fiscal demarcations of the villas took place. This would arise from prolonged leases under the formula alcabalas and salines of the towns of San Viçente and Santander and their lands and the alcabalas and tercias of the towns of Laredo and Castro Ordiales and their lands and terminos. In 1483 the term Quatro Villas appears in the taxation of the kingdom. The Accounting Office of Castile treated the four cities as a single fiscal demarcation, a fact that was consolidated over time, contrary to what happened in other parts of the kingdom, although from 1490 San Vicente de la Barquera was intermittently considered a separate fiscal party.

In 1494, with the creation of the Consulate of Burgos, the four cities were perceived as a unit that shared a common geographic region and royal status. The towns then enjoyed privileges over five leagues around them. With the constitution of the corregimiento, the four cities were joined by the rest of the royal territories of La Montaña, except for merindad of Campoo. The new corregimiento of the Cuatro Villas de la Costa del Mar de Cantabria was made up of three entities that held their separate assemblies: the Cuatro Villas de la Costa, the province of the Nueve Valles, and the merindad of Trasmiera. From the institution in 1749 of the Bourbon intendancies, the corregimiento became politically, administratively, and jurisdictionally in charge of the bastón de Laredo, which obeyed the intendancy of Burgos. Thus, the brotherhood of the Cuatro Villas de la Costa de la Mar was represented by a junta and depended on the corregimiento of the same name, which from the 18th century onwards depended in turn on a council and this, on a monarchical intendancy. Until 1629 the capital of the corregimiento was itinerant so the corregidor spent three months in each of the villas. That same year the corregidor took advantage of the fact that Laredo obtained the seat of tax collection to establish his residence there, the feeling of equality between the cities was broken and lawsuits and disputes were generated that would last until Santander was chosen as the capital of its future province.

Until the foundation of the corregimiento, Santander and San Vicente de la Barquera were part of the merindad of Asturias de Santillana, while Castro-Urdiales and Laredo depended on the merindad of Castilla la Vieja. At the end of the 15th century, the general councils of the Cuatro Villas and the merindad of Trasmiera were constituted. In both cases the twinning charters were presented without the interjection of interests external to each council, contrary to what happened in other places such as Galicia. The third general council of the corregimiento, those of the Nueve Valles, was constituted after a long judicial process called the Lawsuit of the Nine Valleys, at the end of the 16th century.

=== Formation of the province of Cantabria (1778) ===
After several attempts at territorial unification of what is now the autonomous community of Cantabria, some coming from the four villas, these finally joined most of the Cantabrian territory in the province of Cantabria in 1778, on July 28 of that year, although Castro-Urdiales was not part of it until 1796.

These villages were the only ones in all of Cantabria to have walls, which suggests the importance, accumulation of wealth, and economic capacity of these settlements to build these defenses.

Before the commercial fleet, the fishing fleet was born in Cantabria. Documents from the 13th century already inform us of whale fishing and its landing in Santoña. At the end of the same century, cloth, leather, arms, and other merchandise were transiting through the ports of Santander and Castro-Urdiales. The Cantabrian Roy García de Santander is the first navigator of the Castilian Navy to sail the southern seas, participating with his ships in the conquest of Cartagena.

The precise date of the creation of this coalition is unknown, but it is known that when the Catholic Monarchs, already in the 14th century, definitively established the regime of royal corregimientos, most of Cantabria was included in what would be called the corregimiento de las Cuatro Villas, heir to the brotherhood and encompassing the areas of influence of the ports of the former.

This federation would last until the eighteenth century as a useful instrument to prevent the abuse of centralism and safeguard traditional privileges.

== Policy ==
Until the creation of the province of Santander in 1833, the administrative division of Cantabria was extremely complex due to the incompatibility of interests between lords, towns, and kings. In the Modern Age, once the corregimientos were established, the capital of the Cuatro Villas was established in Laredo, a town that had a mayor, who served as advisor to the corregidor in judicial and military matters. Santander, which disputed the capital status with Laredo, also had a mayor, who was delegated by the corregidor and administered justice in the town. In San Vicente de la Barquera and Castro-Urdiales, there were ordinary mayors, who were in charge of governmental matters and, in the first instance, of justice. Again, the exception was Santander, which had two ordinary mayors, one for Puebla Vieja and the other for Puebla Nueva; these mayors had powers in governmental and administrative matters. Both mayors were the highest offices of the councils, which could be restricted, in which case they were formed by an oligarchy, or open, in which a delegation of neighbors could participate. (Note: In the Ancien Regime, the concept of "neighbor" was that of head of household, and the number of heads of household (i.e. families) was counted in the censuses for tax reasons. The censuses of this period, therefore, do not reflect the real population.) Each council had its own ordinances.

In Cantabria, the administrative structure immediately above the council was the valley. In each valley, valley boards were held in which the councils were represented by a delegate who received a different name depending on the place, such as "general representative " or "deputy". In turn, these councils had their own delegates for the general councils of each corregimiento or province; in the case of the Cuatro Villas, the corregimiento of the Cuatro Villas de la Costa del Mar. Ultimately, all the representatives of councils and boards were hidalgos and other members of the lower nobility who, thanks to the political structure described above, dominated the distribution of taxes, the management of public and private property, and all matters of administrative interest. In turn, the Cuatro Villas formed a block within the corregimiento of the same name, together with the Nueve Valles de las Asturias de Santillana and Trasmiera, which from 1749 depended on the intendancy of Bastón de Laredo and this, in turn, on the Intendancy de Burgos. The constant element throughout this overlapping of institutions was that all of them had the king as the sole lord, without depending on abbots or intermediate aristocrats. Government by general boards was common on the Cantabrian coast of Spain. However, while Galicia, Asturias, the Basque provinces separately, and Navarre developed powerful general boards that covered each territory and created their own legislative baggage, this did not happen in Cantabria during the Modern Age. The general boards of the corregimiento of the Cuatro Villas de la Costa were not the only ones in the territory and did not have representation in the Court.

Corregimientos that existed in Cantabria (15th–16th century)
Corregimiento	General board	Jurisdiction
Cuatro Villas de la Costa de la Mar	Cuatro Villas de la Costa de la Mar; Merindad de Trasmiera; Nueve Valles	Crown property (Crown of Castile)
Merindad de Campoo	Merindad de Campoo	Crown property (Crown of Castile)
Province of Liebana	Province of Liébana	Lordship (House of Vega-Casa de Mendoza)
Mayordomazgo de la Vega	Mayordomazgo de la Vega; Honor de Miengo	Lordship (House of Vega-Casa de Mendoza)
Soba, Ruesga and Villaverde	Señorío se Sobra; Señorío de Ruesga; Señorío de Villaverde (or Villaverde de Trucíos)	Lordship (House of Velasco)
Non-existence of corregimiento	Marquesado de Argüeso; Condado de Castañeda; Villa de Pesquera; Villa de Tresviso; Villa de Suances; Other	Lordship, abbacy, and shared jurisdictions.

The meetings of the corregimiento of the Cuatro Villas de la Costa del Mar were held either in Bárcena de Cicero or in rotation among the towns that made it up. Special care was always taken to ensure that none of the towns prevailed over the others under drastic threat of lawsuits (as was the case in 1557 and 1653). From this federation of towns arose, from 1726, the first attempts to merge all the Cantabrian jurisdictions into a single entity under the name of Cantabria, a goal achieved in 1778.

== Demographics ==
The four towns experienced a population increase linked to their economic evolution after the granting of their charters. In 1561 they reached their highest population peak until then, except for Castro-Urdiales, which did so around 1584. However, the plague epidemics brought from Europe that hit Cantabria in 1568, 1596, 1597, and 1598 reduced its population by about 40%. At the same time, there was a succession of economic crises, which meant that the foundations for a population increase were not laid. The 17th century was no kinder, as it was prodigal in terms of corsair attacks, recruitments for the royal armies, food crises, and epidemics, processes analogous to those that also occurred on the Basque Coast. Forced recruitment greatly affected the towns during the 16th and 17th centuries. Thus, the population of Castro-Urdiales shortly before 1590 exceeded 7,000 inhabitants (1,500 residents), but this figure was greatly reduced by the forced conscription for the wars against Portugal, Flanders, and England. In 1741 the number of inhabitants did not even reach 200. Castro-Urdiales sent 380 men to the Invincible Armada alone.

The plagues of 1596–1598 affected Laredo less, whose economy experienced a slight improvement that, together with an immigration phenomenon, allowed it to undertake a modernization of its infrastructures and buildings. From 1652 Santander and Laredo faced slow population increases punctuated by short crises of mortality. In 1752 Laredo had 483 inhabitants, 417 of whom lived in the town center (about 1668 inhabitants), and Santander had 1095, of whom 680 lived in the town (about 2400 inhabitants). Santander, therefore, doubled the population of the second most populated town, Laredo, especially if we count the people of its municipal district, which totaled around 4038 people.

Residents of the Four Towns between 1534 and 1752
Place	1534	1552	1561	1584	1591	1631	1752
Castro-Urdiales	488	660	700	853	656	460	346
Laredo	415	552	586	465	454	380	483
Santander	368	595	808	534	789	690	1095
San Vicente de la Barquera	629	440	1078	343	266	242	250
Total	1900	2247	3172	2195	2165	1772	2174

== Economy ==
The privileges received from Alfonso VIII of Castile gave a great economic boost to the four towns, focused on fishing and European trade. At the beginning of the 16th century, the four towns were the largest cities in what is now the autonomous community of Cantabria, having surpassed other towns, such as Santillana del Mar. In addition, the four towns had their own territories around them, specified in their autonomous charters, and between them, they exercised full jurisdiction over the maritime activities of the entire coast that today forms part of Cantabria. The basis of the economy of the towns was commerce. Thus, the Cadastre of the Marqués de la Ensenada put the salary earnings in Santander at 50,280 reales, compared to 180,345 for the commercial ones.

At the end of the 16th century, the economy contracted, while the population suffered the consequences of successive plagues. From that moment on, mortality in the different towns marked their development. San Vicente de la Barquera and Castro-Urdiales languished slowly, while Laredo and, above all, Santander, faced the 17th century better. In the 18th century, the population increase intensified in Santander, so the town took off economically more than the others. However, the end of the 16th century had put an end to the leadership of the towns, dependent on the Consulate of Burgos, due to the emergence of the port of Bilbao, which since 1511 had its own consulate and foral rights that allowed it to establish a free trade zone and control its taxation. This put an end to the leadership in the transport between Castile and Europe of the four towns and, in addition, that of practically all the towns of the Cantabrian coast. The transfer of the wool trade to Bilbao due to the decline of Burgos was especially detrimental to Santander. The causes of this decline are the decline of Castilian agricultural and livestock production and the wars that Spain fought in the sixteenth century against England, France, and the Netherlands; this caused the decline of trade exchange of Castile with these regions, the main trading partners of the four towns. Another blow was the centralization of the Indian trade in the ports of Seville and Cadiz since the four towns exported American products to Europe.

=== Fishing activities ===
The ships of the four cities anchored both in the Cantabrian Sea and in the Atlantic Ocean, focusing on the capture of cod and whales, from the African coast to the islands of Newfoundland and Ireland. Castro-Urdiales, San Vicente de la Barquera, and Laredo benefited from this activity, in this order, and very little Santander. Subsequently, fishing became almost the only activity in San Vicente. The catches were destined for the northern half of the central plateau, in Castilian territory. However, factors such as competition with English fishing boats, the decline in demand in the interior, and the salt tax of 1631 meant that from 1650 fishing had lost much of its profitability. In 1731 the activity suffered its worst affront when the Treaty of Utrecht prohibited the fishing of the Cantabrian villages in the North Atlantic.

=== Commercial activities ===
Although it was a minor activity, the export of wine to Europe was of some importance in the 16th century. However, most of the wine that reached the villas was sold for local consumption and for the crews. The real commercial importance of these villas, as major ports owned by the Crown of Castile in the north of the Iberian Peninsula, was the wool trade. Wool was shipped from these ports to Atlantic Europe, mainly from Santander and to a lesser extent from Laredo. The wool trade from these localities was regulated in 1494 with the creation of the Consulate of Burgos and constituted its first source of wealth. Other exported products were iron, wood, artillery pieces, and, from Santander, also cereals, while wine, fish and manufactured products were imported from Europe. When wars prevented trade, the towns turned to privateering, under the protection of the Crown of Castile.

In 1529, Laredo received the permit that allowed it to trade with the Indies, provided that on the return voyage its ships docked first in Seville. At the same time, Laredo specialized in importing cloth from the Netherlands, while Santander specialized in importing a vegetable dye called pastel. The most important trade was international trade, which in the case of Santander grew by 534.2% between 1763 and 1768, well above the growth of other large Spanish ports, such as La Coruña (+227.0%) and Gijón (+89.5%).

Commercial income according to the cadastre of the Marquis de la Ensenada of 1753.
City	Income (in reales)	Percentage of income with respect to the total for Cantabria
Castro-Urdiales	No data	No data
Laredo	55 487	12,10%
Santander	108 345	39,40%
San Vicente de la Barquera	17 195	3,80%
Total Cantabria(Reinosa) (Potes)	457 511 (70 470) (24,90%)	100% (15,40%) (5,40%)

=== Industrial activities ===
Fishing was complemented by an industry of pickled and cured fish. There were also industrial and craft workshops, whose projection was modest and reached the regions, exporting any surplus between the towns, especially barrels, oars and tanned products. Shipbuilding also had a certain impact, especially in Laredo, which built a shipyard in Colindres at the service of the Crown in 1619.

== The four cities ==
Castro-Urdiales, San Vicente de la Barquera, Laredo, and Santander received charters in a short period, at the end of the 12th and beginning of the 13th century, initiating a rapid economic development that translated into urban development. Thus, all the towns were walled and, except for Laredo, built urban castles. Their expansion was cut short at the end of the 16th century due to successive crises that affected the Castilian crown. At that time a phenomenon of deurbanization took place and abandoned buildings and plots of land within the walls were reused for the development of primary sector activities. In the case of San Vicente de la Barquera this process was especially serious, lasting until the 19th century, as well as in Castro-Urdiales, while Laredo managed to weather the 17th century and Santander, somewhat less affected by many of the crises, took off again in the mid-eighteenth century.

Castro-Urdiales and Laredo received a foundational charter similar to that of Logroño, so that their jurisdictional terms were wider, with an urban center acting as capital over a rural territory, and their craft and commercial activities were especially enhanced. Santander received the charter of Sahagún and San Vicente de la Barquera that of San Sebastián.

=== Castro-Urdiales ===
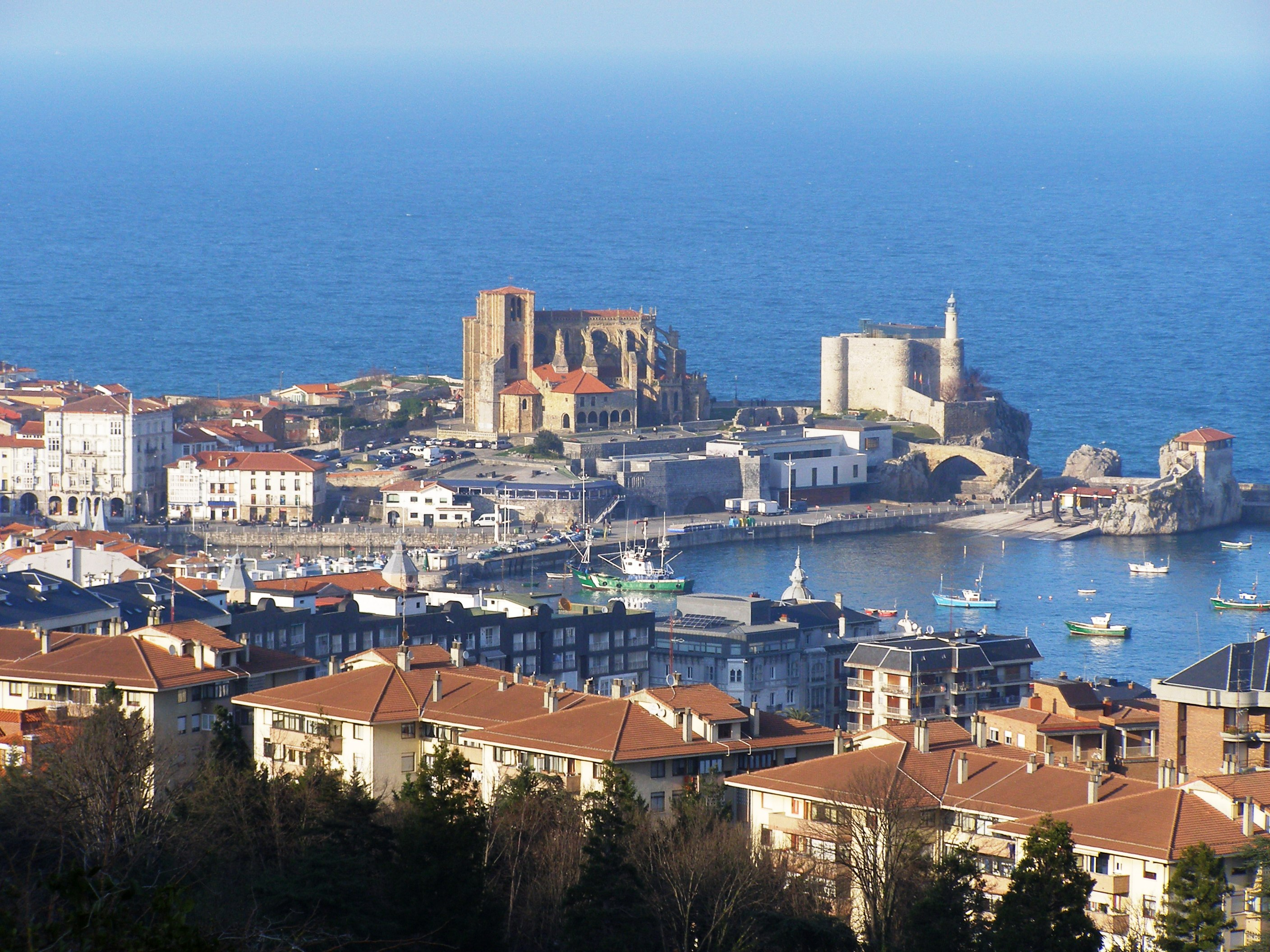
View of the urban center of Castro-Urdiales from the Cantabrian highway.

It was the first to receive a charter and the denomination of city (1163). In 1591, with 2175 inhabitants, it was the most populated of the four towns, although it progressively lost its position to Santander and Laredo. In 1787, with 2243 inhabitants, it only possessed more power than San Vicente de la Barquera. It was governed by a restricted council, also called a regiment, whose positions were until 1641 elected every year except for the mayor, who was handpicked by the corregidor of the Cuatro Villas. In addition to the mayor, the council was made up of a general procurator, a procurator representing the corporation Cabildo de Mareantes de San Andrés, four aldermen, a faithful or steward, and a bailiff. In 1641 the town paid Philip IV 1000 ducats and obtained two privileges: the election of its own mayors and the integration into the Junta de las Cuatro Villas, no longer depending directly on the Corregimiento de las Cuatro Villas. At the time of the corregimiento, the town was divided into two villages or neighborhoods: the Puebla Vieja, the original nucleus, and the Puebla de Abajo, with its origins in a medieval suburb. There was also the Castro, a walled citadel located in the heart of the town that contained a hermitage, a Gothic church, a hospital, a medieval castle, a cemetery and a complex called Palacios del Rey, possibly a vestige of the passage of Alfonso VIII, stationed in Castro-Urdiales in 1208 and 1209, and whose ruins disappeared at the beginning of the 19th century. At the beginning of the 16th century, a cay and a contracay or land pier were built, which as the century progressed gave way to a protected port.

The relationship of Castro-Urdiales with the other towns was unequal. It maintained territorial tensions with Laredo due to the exact limits between its councils and certain economic privileges. Worse were the tensions with the corregidor, who in 1642 tried to appropriate the right to elect the officers of the town's militias. As for disasters, in addition to the epidemics that decimated the European population at the beginning of the 16th century, population growth and the town's fleet suffered greatly with the loss of the Invincible Armada, to which was added a tidal wave that devastated its coast in 1595. Between 1597 and 1598 a great epidemic devastated the entire corregimiento, with special virulence in Castro-Urdiales.

In 1738 Castro-Urdiales, like other Cantabrian towns (at that time, part of the Consulate of Burgos), requested its inclusion in the Lordship of Vizcaya to enjoy the privileges that it had, despite the rejection of Bilbao. In 1741 it was left out of Vizcaya, although it tried to join it again. However, Charles III, on July 23, 1763, resolved the situation by returning the town to the Corregimiento de las Cuatro Villas and returning the money paid for the Basque privileges, a fact that marked its belonging to the Maritime Province of Santander (1799-1801) and, therefore, to present-day Cantabria. Despite the economic loss that the separation from Vizcaya entailed, Castro-Urdiales obtained compensation in 1477 and 1485 with the confirmation of its rights by the Catholic Monarchs.

=== Laredo ===
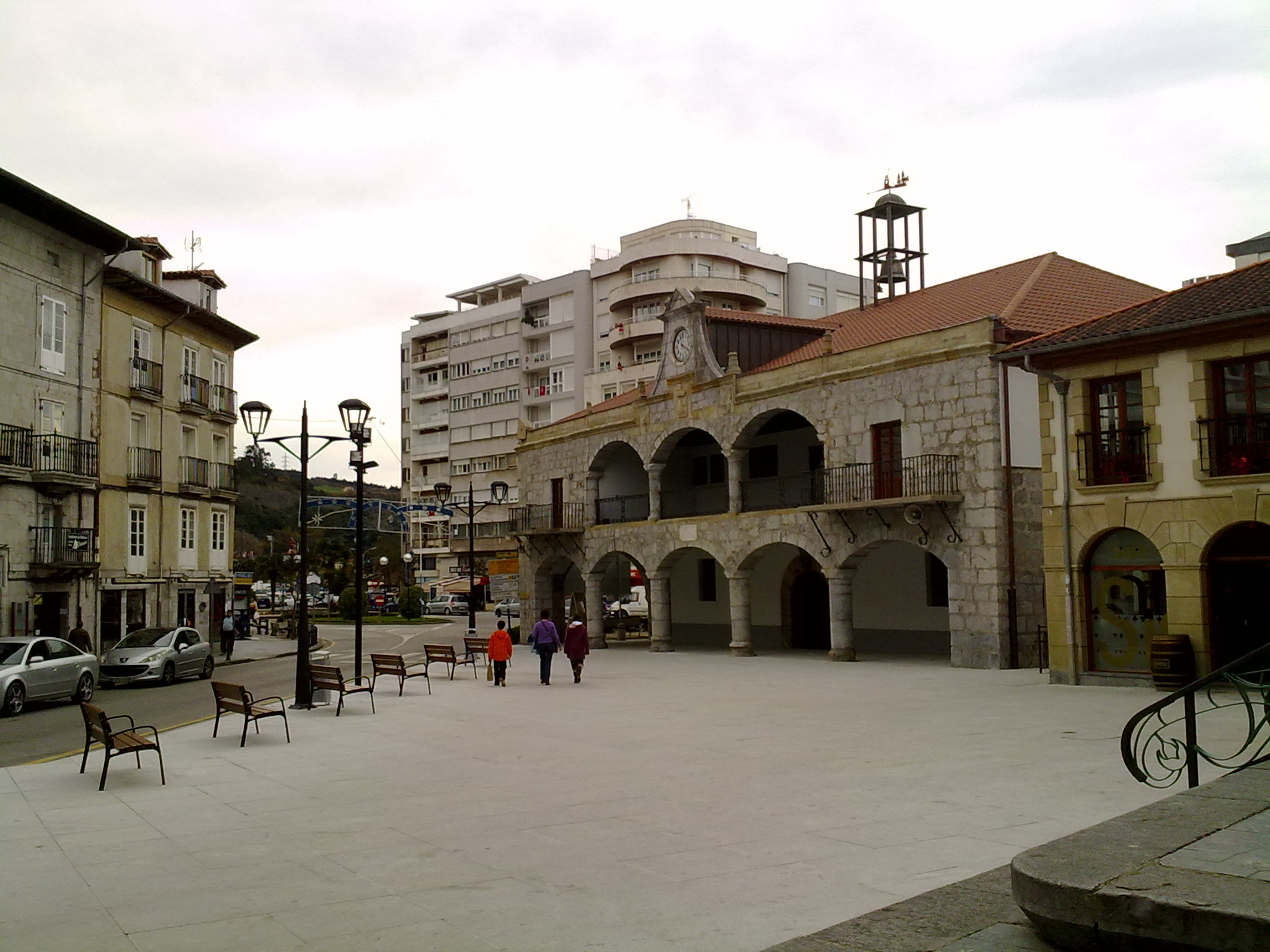
Plaza de la Constitución, at the Puebla Vieja (old suburb) entrance. It highlights the old town hall.

The walls of Laredo protected both the Puebla Vieja and the Arrabal, neighborhoods separated by the river Bario, partially covered in modern times. Primitively only the Puebla Vieja (Old Town) had been walled, disappearing the stretch of wall that separated it from the Arrabal when its extension was built. A Gothic church and prominent tower houses were built in the town, as well as the town hall and the jail. Initially, the town was inhabited by clergymen and nobles, while the artisans and fishermen occupied separate blocks in the suburb. From the 16th century onwards, the suburb became very important, with the main buildings being constructed there and becoming the new urban center. Its jurisdiction extended from the mouth of the Asón River to the mouth of the Agüera River, and inland to Ampuero. Proof of its medieval prestige is its mention in the Cantigas de Santa María and its choice as the port from which Juana la Loca embarked to marry Felipe el Hermoso.

There was some kind of defensive structure in a peninsula that overhung the suburb, but Laredo was the only one of the four towns that lacked a castle. However, it possessed a crenelated breakwater that guarded its inner harbor since 1526, part of a plan that modified the town's and port's urban planning.

Laredo was the seat of the corregidor from 1629, becoming the de facto capital of the four towns of Trasmiera, Santoña and the other towns twinned with Trasmiera, and of the Nine Valleys. However, in 1639 it suffered an attack by the French Armada that devastated the town, which led to the beginning of a slow decline. The seat of the corregimiento was established in Laredo as it was the best communicated with Burgos, using a road that crossed the Cantabrian mountain range through the port of Los Tornos.

=== Santander ===
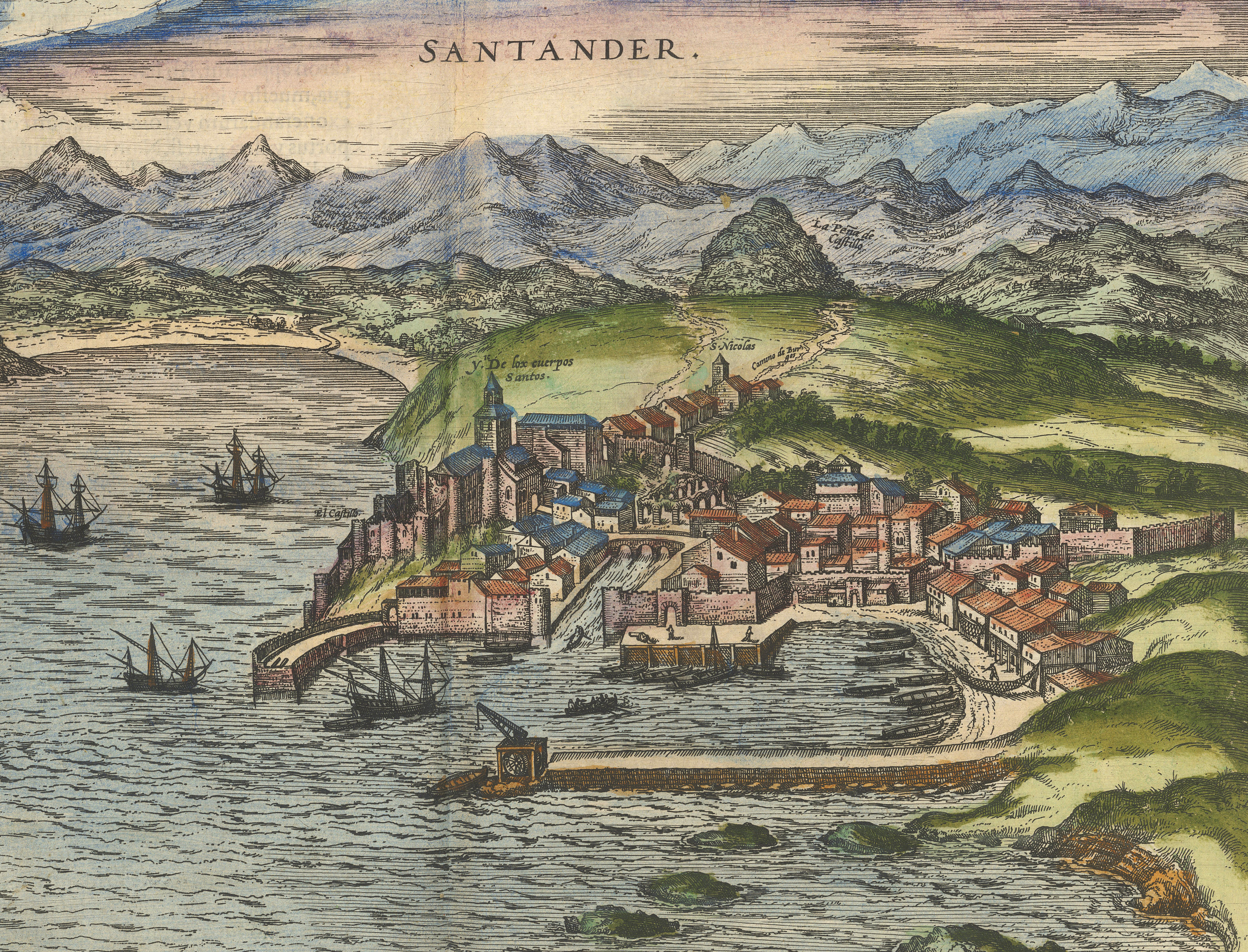
Santander as seen by Joris Hoefnagel at the end of the 16th century. This engraving is the oldest existing image of the city. It is known that Hoefnagel was not in the town at that time and that he did it from other sources for his work Civilates orbis terrarum (The Cities of the World) of 1572.

At the end of the 15th century, when the Corregimiento de las Cuatro Villas was born, Santander had the neighborhoods of Puebla Vieja, Puebla Nueva, separated by the Becedo estuary and joined by a wooden bridge, the Arrabal de Fuera de la Puerta and the Arrabal de la Mar. It had walls, a castle and a Gothic collegiate church, the church of Cuerpos Santos, cathedral since 1754. The castle, called San Felipe, was already old at that time and its fabric was deteriorated. It also had a fortress called La Bastida, located at sea level, which protected the entrance to an inland port, protected by a curved pier. At the end of the Middle Ages, the urban center had moved from the Puebla Vieja to the Puebla Nueva, where the new aristocratic families settled. The city of the time was completed with three hospitals, wool warehouses, a jail, a shipyard built in the 14th century, and several towers and convents.

Santander suffered, like the other towns, the disasters that interrupted the good development of its economy from the second half of the 16th century to the first half of the 17th century. During the second half of the eighteenth century, however, its bourgeoisie and, above all, the Spanish monarchy, recovered the wool trade of Santander. In this way the taxes were passed on to the State, not being lost due to the taxation of the Basque provinces if the wool was exported from Bilbao. The idea, proposed by José Patiño Rosales and developed by the Marquis de la Ensenada, led to the creation of the Flour Road and the economic take-off of the places it crossed, up to Santander. This growth led, among other rights, to Santander obtaining the title of city in 1755.

=== San Vicente de la Barquera ===
The Puebla Vieja (Old Town) of San Vicente, elevated on a promontory overlooking the estuary of San Vicente, had a wall since the 13th century, as well as two suburbs, Tenerías, inhabited by artisans and merchants, and La Ribera or La Mar, where fishermen and sailors lived, united in the Brotherhood of fishermen and sailors of San Vicente de la Barquera, which had its own chapel. In turn, the Puebla Vieja had two neighborhoods, Corro de Arriba and Corro de Abajo, which in the Modern Age were renamed Santa María and San Nicolás, respectively. The former stood out for its Gothic church and the latter for its castle.Two bridges connecteded the isthmus where the town was settled with two sides of the estuary, crossing its arms or estuaries of La Maza and El Peral. In the second half of the 15th century, there was a stone dock and a shipyard in La Ribera, replacing the old docks in El Peral.

== Bibliography ==
- Linares Argüelles, Mariano; Pindado Uslé, Jesús; Aedo Pérez, Carlos. Gran Enciclopedia de Cantabria. Editorial Cantabria. 1985.
- Casado Soto, J. L.; La provincia de Santander. Nota sobre su constitución y ordenanzas (1727-1833). Santander, 1979.
- Maza Solano, T.; Juntas de las Cuatro Villas de la Costa; La revista de Santander, II (1930).
