= Castle of Pedraja =

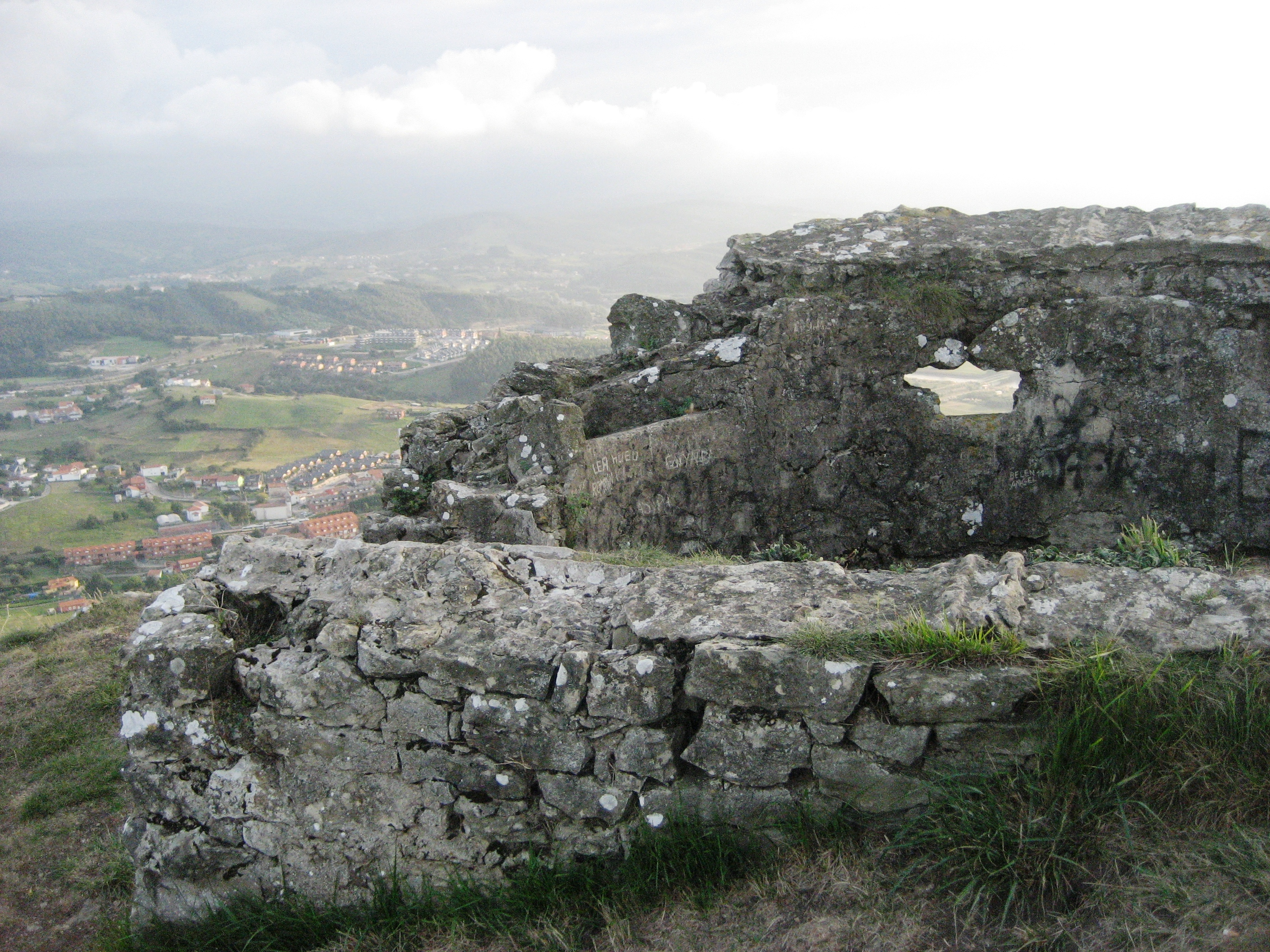

General information
- Status: Archaeological site and castle
- Classification: Asset of cultural interest
- Town or city: Pielagos
- Country: Spain

43°27′17″N 3°55′46″W

The Castle of Pedraja, the Castle of Liencres or Castle of Hercules was a castle-type fortification located on La Picota mountain (also called, at the time, Castle Mountain), overlooking the town of Liencres (Cantabria). It was probably founded by Garcilaso I de la Vega at the end of the 13th century or beginning of the 14th century, as part of the defense of the lordship of La Vega, owned by the House de La Vega. The first clear document that proves its existence is from 1403, when it became the administrative and judicial center of the Vega family, although there is another from 1338 that seems to refer to it. It is considered the largest fortification in the eastern part of the Asturias de Santillana. The castle disappeared at some point in the 19th century. The last known record of it is the citation of Father Sota in 1861, who, upon seeing the ruins, considered that it had been burned and abandoned, probably during the lawsuits that took place in Cantabria during the Modern Age. In reality, it must have been a fairly fortified tower, incorrectly called a castle, like other medieval defensive structures in Cantabria.

Its architecture, according to archaeological remains, was a transition between Romanesque and Gothic. It had a moat 5 m wide and 2 m high, which protected a more or less square enclosure of 36 meters on each side, whose entrance was protected by a rectangular tower. Today the ruins of the tower and the remains of a fence and the moat are preserved. For this reason, it has been protected as an archaeological site since 2004.

== See also ==
- Defensive towers in Cantabria
- House de La Vega
