= Peñarrubia =

Peñarrubia may refer to the following places:

- Peñarrubia, Andalusia, a municipality in Andalusia, Spain
- Peñarrubia, Abra, a municipality in Abra, Philippines
- Peñarrubia, Cantabria, a municipality in Cantabria, Spain
