= Architecture of Cantabria =

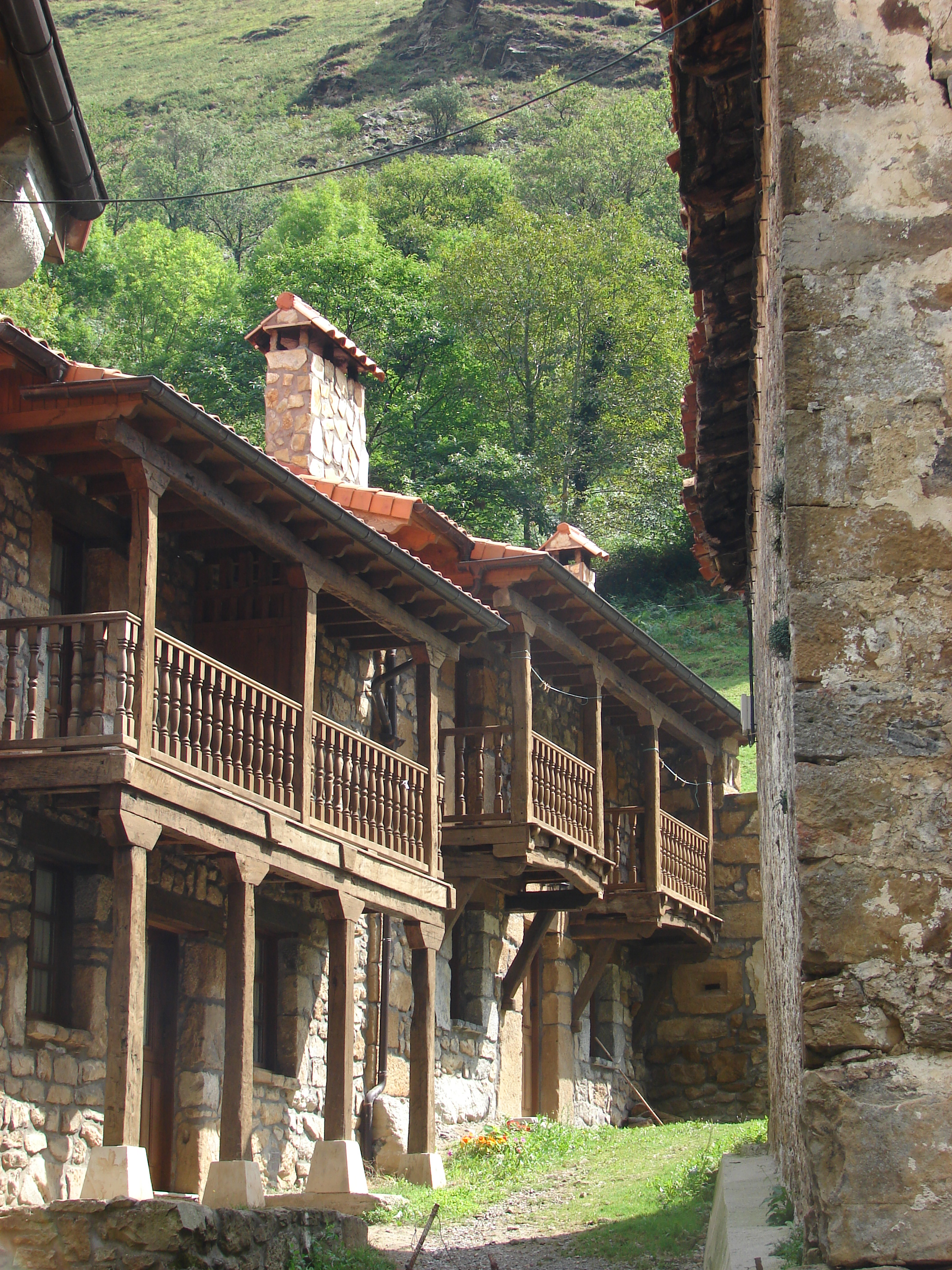
Traditional houses in Soba

The architecture of Cantabria, Spain has developed over centuries from a medieval origin to a unique ensemble of numerous influences and civil works. Direct elements from Gothic Revival, Plateresque, and Renaissance architecture are all consistent throughout. Building on the integration of culture and religion into physical structures to give them purpose.

== Influences ==
=== People ===
From traditional culture to way of life, the people of Cantabria are the influence architectural style. Designed with ancient practices in mind, small homes to palaces all retained that culture. Engraining religion, beliefs, and culture into the foundation of Cantabria's architectural style.

=== Climate ===
Being a mountainous region any structure had to withstand the extreme shifts. Applying materials to ensure the greatest longevity while also conserving to the highest degree. Promoting both the minimization of consumption and significance to architecture. This practice instilled a purpose to the structure itself that altered the view towards its design. Creating a form that meant something on a deeper cultural level working with the environment rather than against it.

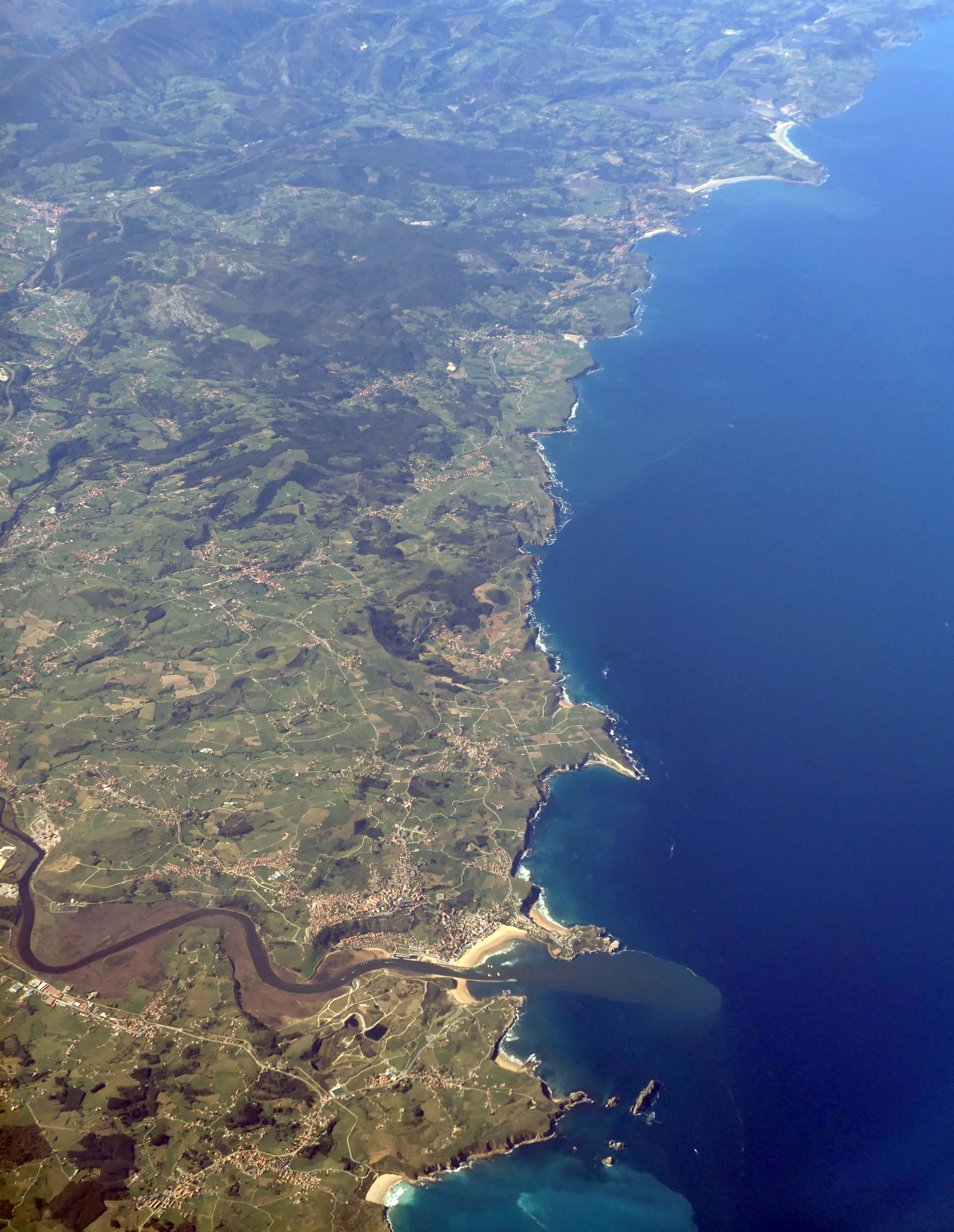
The mountainous coast of Cantabria.

=== Melting Pot Style ===
Cantabria is a unique region in climate, culture, and location. Roman architecture was spread across Spain specifically after the Cantabrian Wars when Roman occupation was secured. Pre-Romanesque influences were most notable throughout the dark period of the ninth to tenth century in Cantabria. Also known as the repopulation period in which the isolated nature was broken as a population increase enhanced connectivity across Europe. This broke the seal on cultural influences as Gothic and Baroque architecture that was extremely prevalent in all other parts of Europe now made impacts to Cantabria.

== Monasteries ==
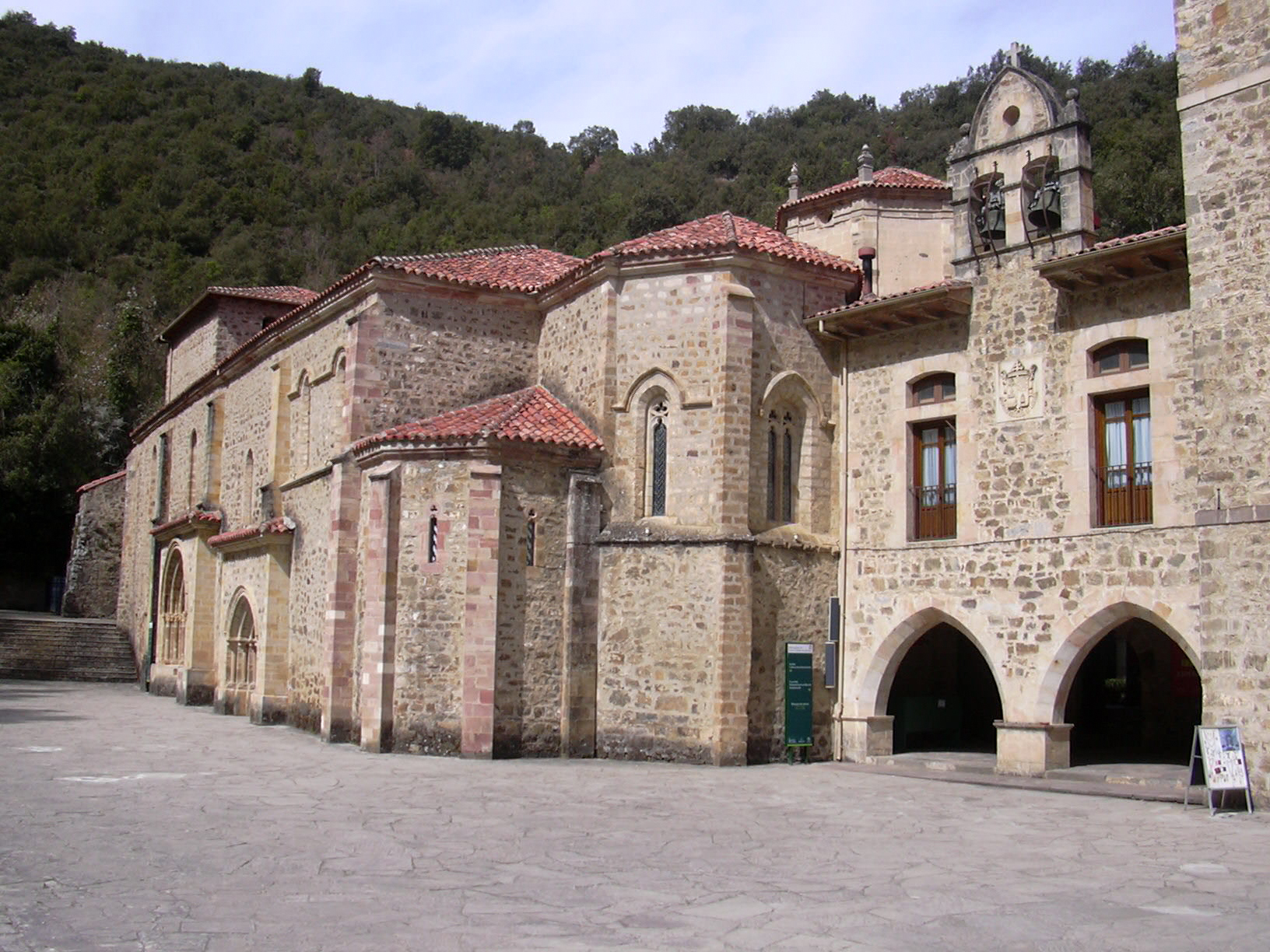
Bare stone exterior of the Monastery.

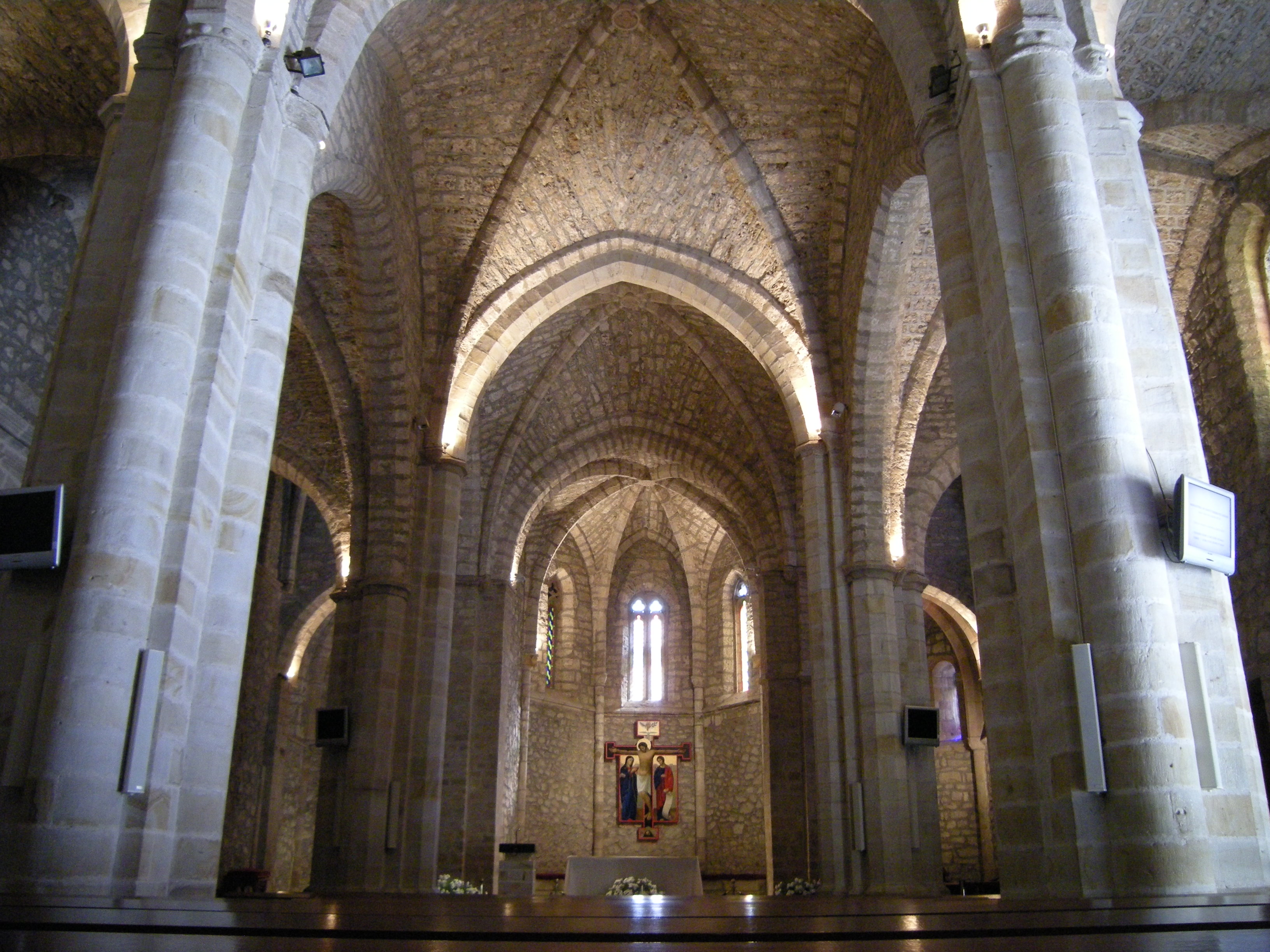
Traditional combination of ribbed and barrel vaulting within the Monastery.

During the Roman occupation of the Cantabrian region, religion was more centralized into the culture. While it had always been integral to the culture and architecture it wasn't until after the tenth century that pure Romanesque influences were developed. In the large and developing space of Cantabria there were few consolidated communities. Rather people opted for rural development which dynamically changed architecture as monasteries began to take on more uses. Instead of a singular functioning religious purpose they took on both cultural and agricultural responsibilities. Retaining the traditional combination of ridge and barrel vaulting within its structure to the buttressing meant for reinforcement. Use of depth exteriorly in brick, stone, and sculptural elements mirroring classical interior element design. Contained within supportive stone walls that were extensively designed to support the vaulting by being thicker and shorter. All the classical Roman elements of religious architecture adapted into a multifunctioning collaboration of community and culture. Monastery of Santo Toribio de Liebana demonstrates the traditional deep arching entrance portals through the thick stone carved exterior. With no access to additional washing or colorants the bare stone was only accented by the terracotta red shingled roof. Kept minimal following the Romanesque style of a sacred space free from any distractions of opulence.

== See also ==
- Spanish Architecture
