= Asturias de Oviedo =

Historical comarca in the Kingdom of Asturias

Asturias de Oviedo is one of the historical comarcas in the Kingdom of Asturias. It extended from the Eo River in the west to the Deva River in the east, and from the Bay of Biscay in the north to the Cordillera Cantábrica in the south. Its capital and chief city was Oviedo. To its east lay the comarca of Asturias de Santillana.

The comarca received official status only with the reorganisation enacted by Ferdinand III of Castile in 1230 shortly after his accession to the Kingdom of León. It was designed, in part, to unite the two kingdoms, León and Castile, permanently. While the Asturias de Oviedo remained a part of León, the Asturias de Santillana with their capital in Santillana del Mar was placed within Castilian jurisdiction. In the 1833 territorial division of Spain the comarca was mostly converted into the province of Oviedo, now the province of Asturias.
