= Asturias de Santillana =

Territorial division of large and small royal political merindades during the Later Middle Age.

Asturias de Santillana is a historical comarca whose territory in large part corresponded to the central and western part of today's autonomous community of Cantabria, as well as the extreme east of Asturias. Most of the province of Asturias belonged to the comarca of Asturias de Oviedo. Also known as a merindad and documented since the 13th century, Asturias de Santillana comprised the western part of Cantabria (except Liébana which belongs to another comarca) including the Saja River valley and the Nansa River. Its borders used to go along the coast from the council of Ribadedeva to the municipality of El Astillero (old Camargo Valley), to the shores of the Bay of Santander), which leads to the administrative division of Trasmiera. From the south it went up to the Cantabrian cordillera. All of the valleys of this comarca are perpendicular to the coast.

The merinos were representatives of the king and they lived in this administrative division of Santillana del Mar (Cantabria), which is the capital of that territory since 1209. For their living quarters they built a Gothic tower which was secluded from the original urban center, thus creating a new town center, of civil character, around the Torre del Merino (Marine Tower). In 1581, soon after the Nine Valleys Lawsuit, the governor stopped being a marine major and became known as a "corrigador," a local administrative and judicial official.

Along the marine coast one finds the localities of Santillana del Mar, Comillas and San Vicente de la Barquera. To the west one finds the Saja and Nansa valleys.

During the Early Middle Ages and the Ancien Régime, Asturias de Santillana was dominated by the large nobility lines: that of the houses of Mendoza-de la Vega, Dukes of the Infantado, the Marquises of Santillana, and those of Manrique de Lara, the Marquis of Aguilar de Campoo and the Counts of Castañeda.

Between 1785 and 1833 it became part of the Quartermaster of Burgos.
