= Piélagos =

- Municipality
- Coat of arms

- Location of Piélagos

- Location in Spain
- Coordinates: 43°21′28″N 3°57′29″W
- Country: Spain
- Autonomous community: Cantabria
- Province: Cantabria
- Comarca: Santander
- Judicial district: Santander
- Capital: Renedo de Piélagos

Government
  - Alcalde: Carlos Caramés

Area
  - Total: 83.33 km^{2} (32.17 sq mi)
- Elevation: 37 m (121 ft)

Population (2025-01-01)
  - Total: 26,901
  - Density: 322.8/km^{2} (836.1/sq mi)
- Time zone: UTC+1 (CET)
  - Summer (DST): UTC+2 (CEST)

Piélagos is a municipality in Cantabria, Spain.
