= Reocín =

Coordinates: 43.3611°N 4.0864°W

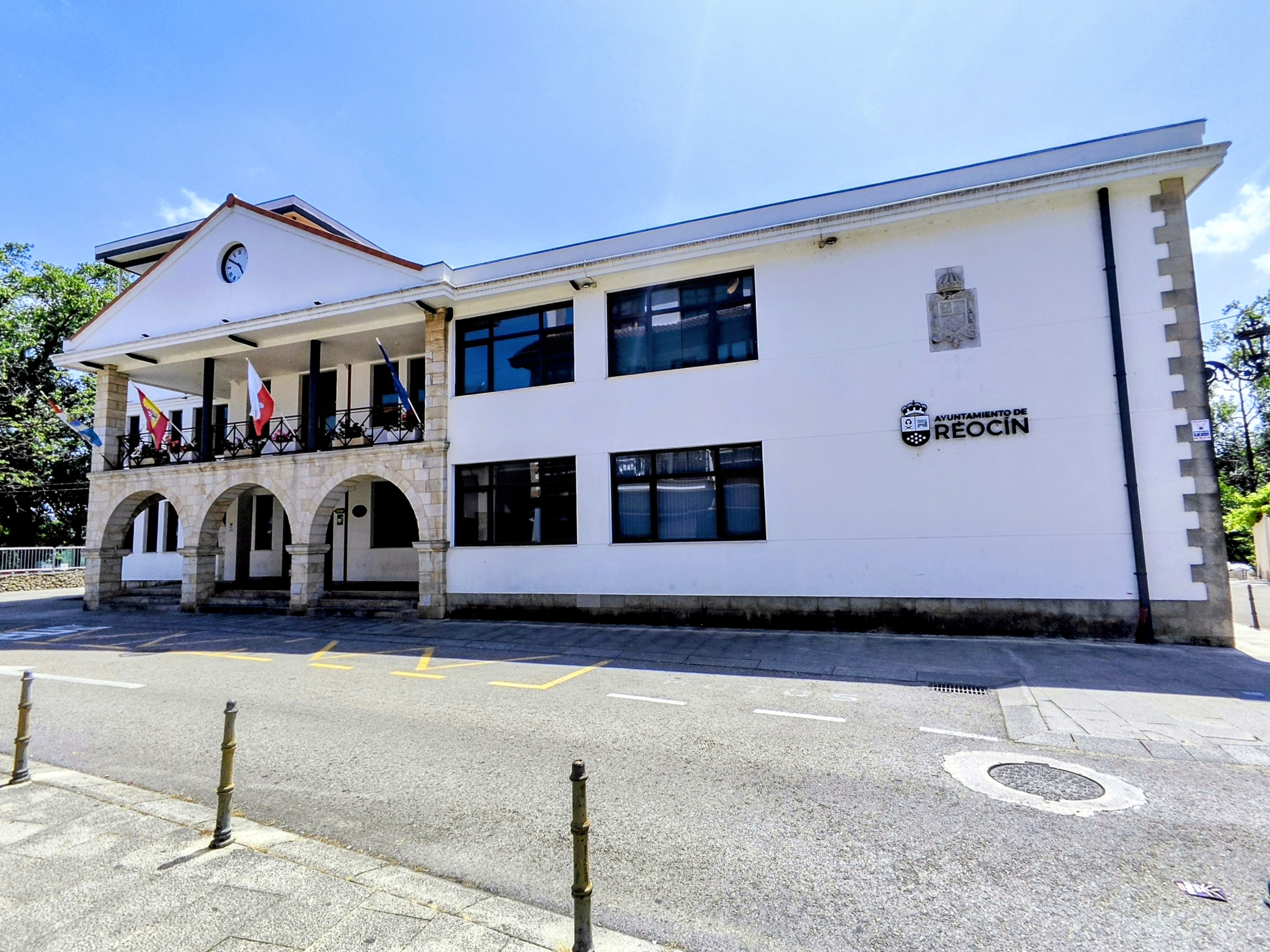
- Town hall Bandera_de_Reocín_(Cantabria).svg

- Coat of arms

- Location in Spain.
- Country: Spain
- Autonomous community: Cantabria

Area
  - Total: 32.09 km^{2} (12.39 sq mi)
- Elevation: 79 m (259 ft)

Population (2025-01-01)
  - Total: 8,389
  - Density: 261.4/km^{2} (677.1/sq mi)
- Time zone: UTC+1 (CET)
  - Summer (DST): UTC+2 (CEST)
- Website: www.reocin.es

Reocín is a municipality in Cantabria, Spain.
