= Peñarrubia, Cantabria =

Municipality in Cantabria, Spain

Peñarrubia
- Municipality
- Coat of arms

- Location of Peñarrubia in Cantabria.

- Location in Spain
- Coordinates: 43°15′21″N 4°34′43″W
- Country: Spain
- Autonomous community: Cantabria
- Province: Cantabria
- Comarca: Saja-Nansa

Government
  - Mayor: Secundino Caso Roiz (PSC-PSOE)

Area
  - Total: 18.61 km^{2} (7.19 sq mi)
- Elevation: 23 m (75 ft)
- Highest elevation: 210 m (690 ft)
- Lowest elevation: 0 m (0 ft)

Population (2025-01-01)
  - Total: 301
  - Density: 16.2/km^{2} (41.9/sq mi)
- Demonym: Peñarru(s)co (Spanish)
- Time zone: UTC+1 (CET)
  - Summer (DST): UTC+2 (CEST)
- Postal code: See list of postal codes in Spain
- Dialing code: +34
- Official language(s): Spanish
- Website: Official website

Peñarrubia is a municipality in the west of Cantabria, Spain. The municipality includes La Hermida, a mountain gorge. The Deva river crosses the municipality.
