= Penagos =

- Municipality
- Coat of arms

- Location of Penagos

- Location in Spain
- Coordinates: 43°21′46″N 3°25′29″W
- Country: Spain
- Autonomous community: Cantabria
- Province: Cantabria
- Comarca: Santander
- Judicial district: Medio Cudeyo
- Capital: Penagos

Government
  - Alcalde: José Carlos Lavín Cuesta

Area
  - Total: 31.67 km^{2} (12.23 sq mi)
- Elevation: 134 m (440 ft)

Population (2025-01-01)
  - Total: 2,253
  - Density: 71.14/km^{2} (184.3/sq mi)
- Time zone: UTC+1 (CET)
  - Summer (DST): UTC+2 (CEST)
- Website: Official website

Penagos is a municipality located in the autonomous community of Cantabria, Spain. It has a population of 2,020 inhabitants (2013).

== Localities ==
- Arenal.
- Cabárceno.
- Llanos.
- Penagos (Capital).
- Sobarzo.
