= Count of Castañeda =

Spanish nobility title

- Crown of Count
- Creation: August 25, 1430
- Created by: Henry II of Castile
- First holder: Garcí Fernández Manrique
- Present holder: Álvaro Travesedo y Juliá

The Count of Castañeda, ruled by the Counts of Castañeda, a Spanish noble title of late medieval origin, was the first physical territory granted to an aristocrat in the region now occupied by the autonomous community of Cantabria. It initially belonged to the Manrique family. Geographically, it was located in territory originally belonging to the Asturias de Santillana comarca, bordering to the west with the marquisate of Santillana. The nobility title was used for centuries by the eldest sons of the holders of the marquisate of Aguilar de Campoo, first class Grandee of Spain, nowadays, both dignities are separated.

== History ==
=== Lords of Castañeda ===
The family origins of the Lordship of Castañeda.

- 1st Lord of Castañeda. Gutiérrez Rodríguez de Asturias (of Santillana). Son of the Duke of Asturias and Count of Oviedo Rodrigo Díaz "the Asturian" (so called to differentiate him from his cousin and brother-in-law "the Castilian", Rodrigo Díaz, the Cid) and the Infanta Jimena de Carrión, he was the first Lord of Castañeda as he married a lady of the ancient and powerful house of the López de Haro family, who held the Lordship of the Castañeda valley.
- 2nd Lord of Castañeda. Muño Gutiérrez of Asturias married to Sancha of Castile, daughter of Alfonso VI.
- 3rd Lord of Castañeda. Gómez Muñoz de Castañeda.
- 4th Mr. De Castañeda. Diego Gómez de Castañeda married to his aunt, Mayor Álvarez de las Asturias.
- 5th Mr. De Castañeda. Pedro Díaz de Castañeda
- 6th and last Mr. De Castañeda. Diego Gómez de Castañeda. He sold his rights over the lordship to Alfonso XI, to his son D. Tello, Count of Vizcaya and Aguilar. This is the end of the Castañeda lordship and the creation of the County of Castañeda.

King Alfonso XI (1312–1350) granted the lordship, together with the territory of Liébana and Aguilar de Campoo (1339), to one of his bastards, the Infante Don Tello Count of Vizcaya and Aguilar, brother of King Enrique II, his son Juan Téllez who married Leonor de la Vega. To begin with, the marriage between Juan Téllez and Leonor de la Vega united the two most powerful houses of Las Asturias de Santillana (present-day Cantabria). Juan Téllez was the heir of Don Tello, Count of Vizcaya, Lord of Aguilar and Castañeda, legitimised son of Alfonso XI. For her part, Leonor de la Vega, as the only descendant of the House of Vega, was the rich female heir of the Garcilaso family, a lineage that had accumulated a considerable patrimony in the Asturias of Santillana, far beyond its original domain in present-day Torrelavega. A link devised to unify control of the north of Castile. Aldonza Téllez, daughter of Juan Téllez and his wife Leonor de la Vega, the sole heir to her father's possessions, had married Garci Fernández Manrique, so that his consort would end up holding the title of 1st Count of Castañeda.

King Henry II of Castile, in the 14th century, confirmed Castañeda to his brother Tello Alfonso, Lord of Biscay. Shortly before his death in 1370, Tello wrote in his will that Castañeda was to go to an illegitimate daughter named María, who had not been raised with him and who later married Juan Hurtado de Mendoza. Henry II, however, annulled the will on 18 February 1371, giving it to Juan Tellez, the first-born son of Tello Alfonso, who also held, among other titles, the title of Marquis of Aguilar de Campoo.

Through his descendants came Garci Fernández Manrique married to Aldonza Tellez, of whom it is known that in 1398 he used the titles of "lord of Aguilar de Campoo" and "marquis of Castañeda", titles that are repeated in the Chronicle of Juan II from 1510. It is possible, therefore, that Garci Fernández Manrique received in 1420 the title of count and perhaps some lands, but not the majority of the county.

Juan Téllez died in 1385, and soon after his son Juan el Mozo. This was the beginning of some of the problems for Aldonza Téllez, his heir, which became greater when the widow Doña Leonor remarried, just two years after her first husband's death, to Diego Hurtado de Mendoza, Admiral Major of Castile and Mayor of the Merindad de la Asturias de Santillana, who continued the expansion of the territorial domains of medieval Cantabria. Their son, Íñigo López de Mendoza, born in the family home of the De La Vega family in Carrión de los Condes, was granted the title of Marquis of Santillana by King Juan II in 1445, and thirty years later the Catholic Monarchs named his heir, Diego Hurtado de Mendoza, Duke of the Infantado.

Doña Aldonza and her mother Doña Leonor quarrelled for many years. The former because she wanted to keep what she had inherited from her father, and Doña Leonor because once married to Diego Hurtado de Mendoza she wanted to keep her interests in Liébana, Campoo and the Asturias de Santillana intact, which led to serious conflicts between the two houses, the Manrique Counts of Castañeda and future Marquises of Aguilar and the Mendoza family, future Marquises of Santillana, for the possession of the latter territories.

=== Title holders ===
==== First Count Garci Fernández Manrique ====
The title of Count of Castañeda was granted to Garci IV Fernández Manrique de Lara in 1430, who at the time was chief steward of the Infante Enrique de Trastámara. The county came into being as a privilege of King Ferdinand I of Aragon on the occasion of the marriage of his son Henry, for Garci's service to the latter. The title was challenged by Pero Fernández de Velasco, who claimed that the lands of the new lordship were his. To compensate him, the king promised him the delivery of 60,000 maravedis a year, which put an end to the claim. It is probable that the Velasco family had possessed part of the lands of the county, if we take for certain the hypothesis already put forward that in 1420 Fernández Manrique received lost lands through sale or inheritance and a title of count, but not the whole county or his first noble title. This same loss of land occurred at the same time in other nearby lordships, such as the Marquisate of Aguilar, from which Liébana and La Pernía were separated. It is possible that the Velascos received the lands by concession from Enrique III. In addition, the Velascos received the county of Castañeda from the hands of Juan II.

In 1421, due to certain bellicose acts and disobedience to the king, John II of Castile gave Álvaro de Luna the town of San Esteban de Gormaz, which belonged to the dominions of Fernández Manrique. The latter, determined to assert the privileges he had received, called himself Count of Castañeda and took possession of the place. The king forbade his lordship and ordered the inhabitants to seize Fernández Manrique if he tried to impose himself on them as lord, and to send him to his court. However, the messenger carrying the orders was beaten by knights loyal to Manrique. Months later Juan II set out for Castañeda to take reprisals. He stayed in Aguilar de Campoo and sent ahead the corregidor Pedro González del Castillo with a large escort. Pedro tried the count's followers, killing some of them, and demolished several houses and towers. Garci Fernández Manrique, however, fled. He presented himself before the king in Madrid together with the Infante Enrique on 13 June 1422 to pay him homage, but the king imprisoned them in the Alcázar. From there Manrique was taken to Ávila, and his goods were confiscated until 1428, when he was released and his lands were returned to him. In 1429 he took the oath of the great knights to the king, after which Juan II definitively established the title of Castañeda in his favour.

The first count tried to seize the valley of Toranzo and some territories of the Asturias de Santillana, usurping the jurisdiction of the justice in Cartes.

==== Second Count Juan Fernández Manrique ====
Juan Fernández Manrique was the second Count of Castañeda. He was heir to Garci Manrique, who left him the county, along with other lands, in his will of 1436, and great-grandson of Tello, brother Henry II of Castile through his mother. Juan took advantage of his power in matters of justice to give shelter to various criminals. In 1480 he established an entailed Majorat. Juan Manrique was bellicose and ambitious, so that the inhabitants of the county continually complained to the kings. In 1480, the kings ordered the demolition of the manor tower of Toranzo as a punishment. He sought to extend his dominion and to extend the privileges of his lineage.

Juan Manrique received from his mother Aldonza, in her will of 1443, the lordship of Campoo. To prove his right over Aguilar, Juan presented documents purporting to prove the inheritance, documents that Enrique II had given to Tello before he died in a strange way. Despite the complaints of his brother Gabriel Fernández Manrique, the first Count of Osorno, Juan gave the marquisate to his first-born son Garci Fernández Manrique (1st Marquis of Aguilar de Campoo), a bastard son legitimised in 1453 by King John II. The Council of Castile allowed this inheritance with the exception of the monastery of Santa María la Real.

In 1462 he bought the county of Buelna (the territory, not the title), so he was called "Count of Buelna". His great-great-grandson Luis Fernández Manrique de Lara, 4th Marquis of Aguilar de Campoo, also used this title, as did his son Bernardo Manrique de Lara y Mendoza de Aragón, 5th Marquis of Aguilar de Campoo, although none of these three possessed the title of Count of Buelna.

==== Third Count Garci Fernández Manrique ====
Juan Manrique, who died at the age of 95, left Castañeda to his son Garci Fernández Manrique, who managed to legitimise his possession of Aguilar, as the Catholic Monarchs officially recognised his title of 1st Marquis over that lordship and allowed him to appoint merinos in Trasmiera, Toranzo and Carrión; however, the kings took the opportunity to curtail the rights that the Counts of Castañeda had taken by force in royal territories. The legitimisation of these domains made the 3rd Count of Castañeda and 1st Marquis of Aguilar de Campoo one of the most powerful figures in what is now Cantabria, if not the most powerful. However, his power was threatened by the complaints of various valleys, which rose up in lawsuits against him, although only Orbaneja managed to impose itself on him by judicial means, in 1494. After Garci Fernández Manrique, the lordships of Castañeda and Aguilar were united.

The current holder of the title is Álvaro Travesedo y Juliá, XXVIII Count of Castañeda, since 2003.

== Bibliography ==
- Salazar Y Castro (2001). Elenco de grandezas y títulos nobiliarios españoles (in Spanish). HIDALGUIA. ISBN 8489851298.
