= Latarmá River =

River in Spain

Coordinates: 43°16′45″N 4°28′57″W

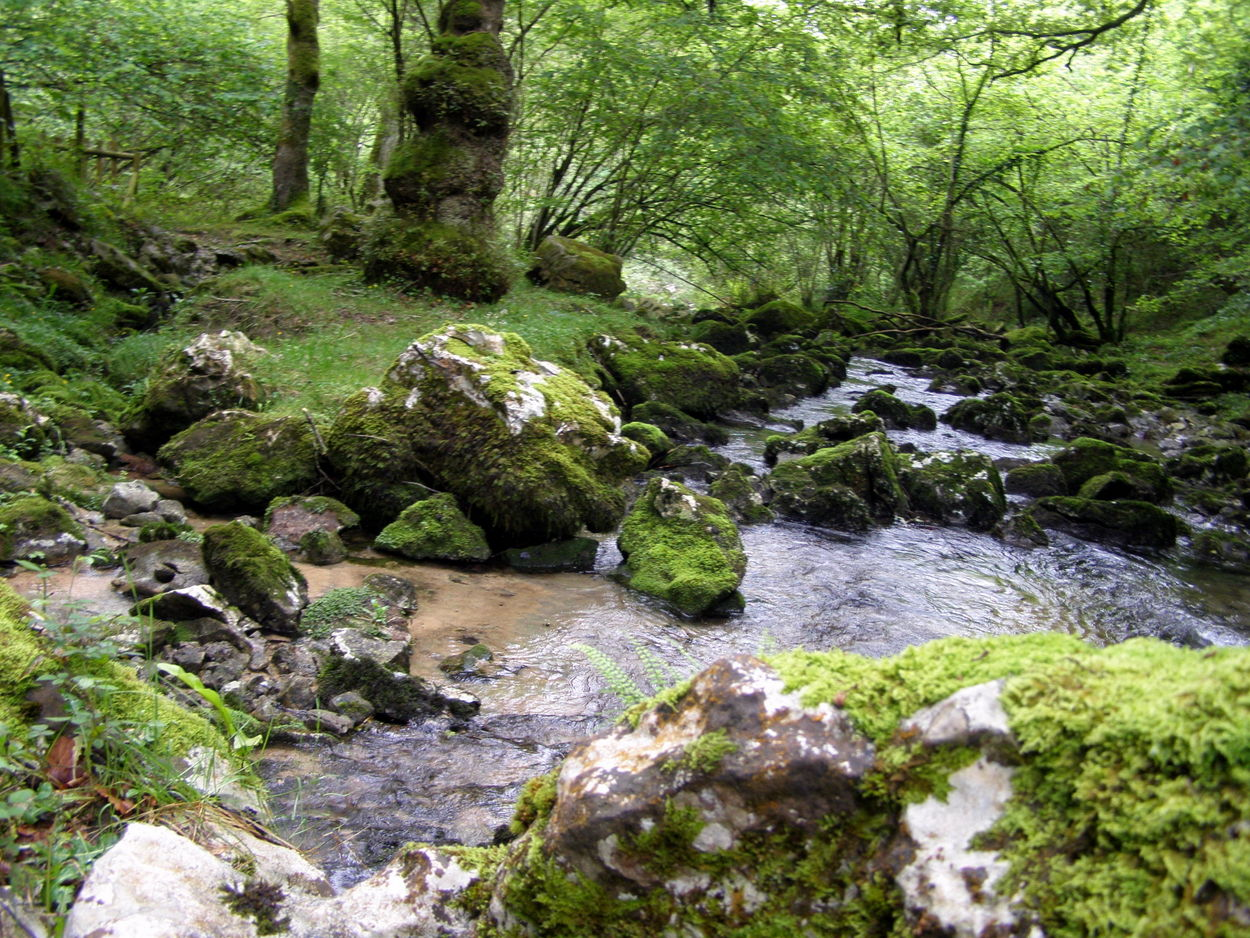
Latarmá River

The Latarmá, Latarma or Arria river is a fluvial course in Cantabria, Spain. It is a tributary of the Lamasón River and a subaffluent of the Nansa River, to whose river basin it belongs. Measuring 9 kilometres (5.6 mi) in length, it rises from an altitude of 339 metres (1,112 ft) to 180 metres (590 ft) at discharge.

== Geography ==
The headwaters begin at the macizo de Arria, in the Peña Rubia, and the first third of its route passes through Asturias, until its confluence with the Lamasón, the Latarmá alternates between being submerged and visible. There are two important upwellings, one at the height of the Lafuente (339 msnm), and another next to Venta Fresnedo (180 msnm). The last cave in which to submerge is the cueva del Toyo, before joining with the Lamasón in Venta Fresnedo. Flowing in a west to east direction, its course is located in the partially karst valley that bears its name, in the town of Herrerías. The successive tributaries are named, beginning with the first one, Chorro Bucero, Arauco, Seguedal, La Huerta, Pozo del Agua and Nacimiento del Agua.
