= Hispania Tarraconensis =

Roman province on the Iberian Peninsula

Coordinates: 41.1165°N 1.2552°E

Provincia Hispania Tarraconensis
- Province of the Roman Empire
- 27 BC–472
- Capital: Tarraco
- Historical era: Antiquity
  - Established: 27 BC
  - Visigothic conquest: 472
Preceded by	Succeeded by
Hispania Citerior	Visigothic Kingdom; Kingdom of the Suebi
- Today part of: Spain; Portugal

Hispania Tarraconensis was one of three Roman provinces in Hispania. It encompassed much of the northern, eastern and central territories of modern Spain along with modern northern Portugal. Southern Spain, the region now called Andalusia, was the province of Hispania Baetica. On the Atlantic west lay the province of Lusitania, partially coincident with modern-day Portugal.

== History ==
Hispania Tarraconensis in 27 BC

=== Establishment ===
The Phoenicians and Carthaginians colonised the Mediterranean coast of Iberia in the 8th to 6th centuries BC. The Greeks later also established colonies along the coast. The Romans arrived in the 2nd century BC during the Second Punic War.

The province Hispania Citerior Tarraconensis was established in the reign of Augustus as the direct successor of the Roman Republican province of Hispania Citerior ("nearer Hispania"), which had been ruled by a propraetor. The roots of the Augustan reorganisation of Hispania are found in Pompey the Great's division of Hispania between three of his legates at the end of the Republic, immediately before his civil war with Julius Caesar. As a result of the agreements that led to the formation of the First Triumvirate in 60 BC, Pompey had received the governorship of the Iberian provinces. Given that he preferred to remain in Rome, where he could oversee affairs in the capital, he delegated the government of Hispania to three legates:

- Lucius Afranius in Hispania Citerior, with three legions;
- Marcus Petreius in the eastern part of Hispania Ulterior, with two legions;
- Marcus Terentius Varro in the western part of Hispania Ulterior, with two legions.

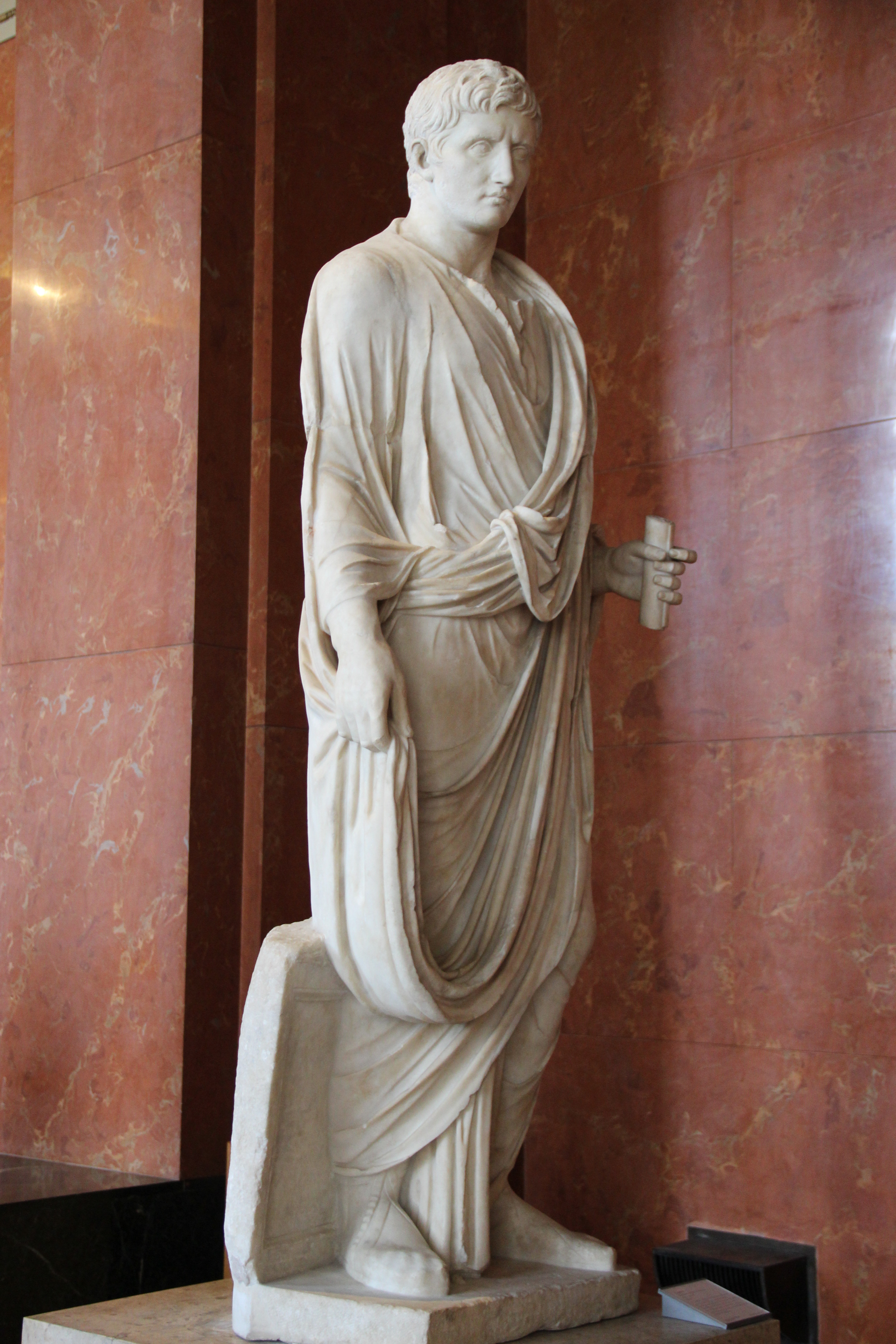
Augustus, wearing the toga of a consul, the role that he held in 27–26 BC when he founded Tarraco

At the end of the civil wars, Pompey's division was consolidated by Augustus in 27 BC, when he formally established the three provinces of Hispania Citerior Tarraconensis, Hispania Ulterior Lusitania (corresponding to modern Portugal, apart from the northern region of the modern country, plus Spanish Extremadura), and Hispania Ulterior Baetica (corresponding to the southern part of Spain, i.e. Andalusia). Citerior and Lusitania were Imperial provinces, while Baetica was a Senatorial province.

The creation of these new provinces was achieved in order to facilitate the incorporation of the northwestern portion of the Iberian peninsula, inhabited by the Gallaeci, Cantabri, and Astures, into the Roman empire. Tarraconensis thus served as a base for the annexation of these territories during the Cantabrian Wars (27–19 BC). Augustus himself resided from 27 to 26 BC at Segisama (modern Sasamón, Burgos), and at Tarraco, where he received an embassy from India. During this period he was accompanied by his nephew and heir, Marcellus, and his stepson, the future emperor Tiberius, both of whom served as military tribunes in 25 BC in the conflict with the Cantabrians – the pair's first military commands.

The name of the province derives from its capital, Colonia Urbs Triumphalis Tarraco. The provincial borders were modified in 12 BC, in order to incorporate the Galician and Asturian territories which had previously belonged to Lusitania, and perhaps to an ephemeral Transduriana province before that, as well as the mining area around Castulo that had previously been part of Baetica. This reorganisation meant that all Roman troops stationed in Hispania were henceforth under the command of a single Roman legate based at Tarraconensis and that the main mining regions, which supplied precious metals to the Imperial treasury (gold in the Galician Massif, silver in Sierra Morena), were under the direct control of the Imperial administration, with easy access by sea to Italia and Rome, where the Imperial mints were located.

=== Pacification and Romanisation under the Julio-Claudians and Flavians ===
In addition to creating the province and setting its borders, Augustus followed the directions left by Julius Caesar in granting many communities in the province the privileged status of colonia or municipium (Roman or Latin), especially along the Levante coast, the part of Baetica transferred to the province in 12 BC, and the Ebro Valley, along with some foundations on the Meseta Central and in the northeast. He also regularised the status of the other political entities in the province, the civitates stipendiaria (communities subject to tribute), whose affairs could be directly intervened in by the governor.

This policy was continued by Tiberius (AD 14–37), who increased the number of municipia in the northern part of the Meseta Central.

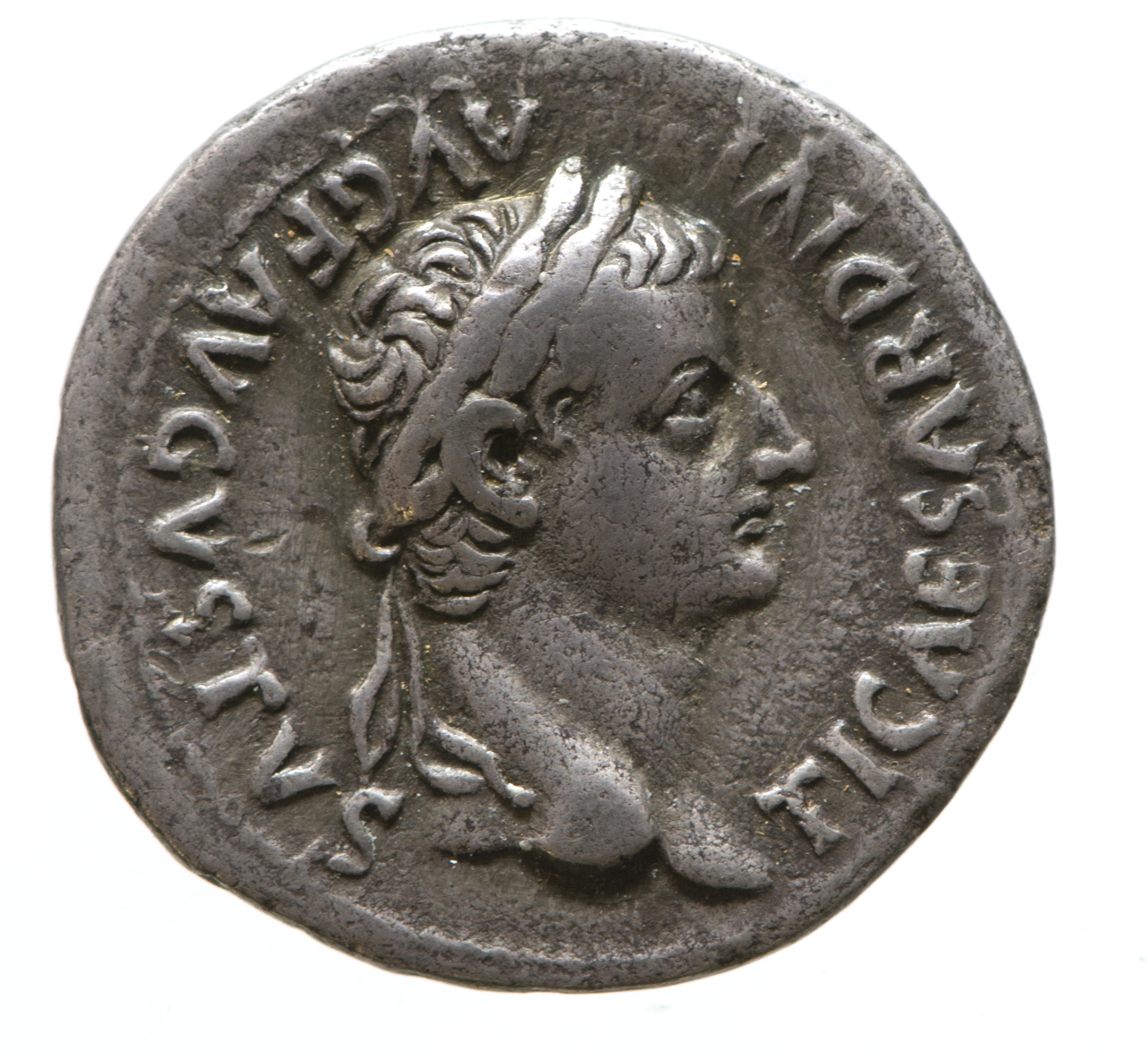
Denarius of Tiberius. The introduction of Roman coinage throughout Tarraconensis allowed its inhabitants to engage more closely with the commercial networks of the Mediterranean world.

Between the reigns of Augustus and Nero, imperial interventions led to the regularisation of the old pre-Roman roads and their conversion into Roman roads, which formed a framework for the provincial territory which brought the provincials into contact with Roman culture (Latin rapidly became the common language of the province) and gave them access to highly developed economic networks and a monetary economy. Ceramics began to be imported in large quantities – Arretine ware from Italy under Augustus and Tiberius and Samian ware from Gaul between the reigns of Caligula and Vespasian.

The province was effectively at peace except for an attempt at rebellion by the Astures under Nero which was easily suppressed by a primus pilus of the Legio VI Victrix. As a result, it was possible to progressively reduce the military garrison of the province. In AD 42–43, Claudius transferred the Legio IV Macedonica to Germania and in AD 63 Nero sent the Legio X Gemina to Pannonia.

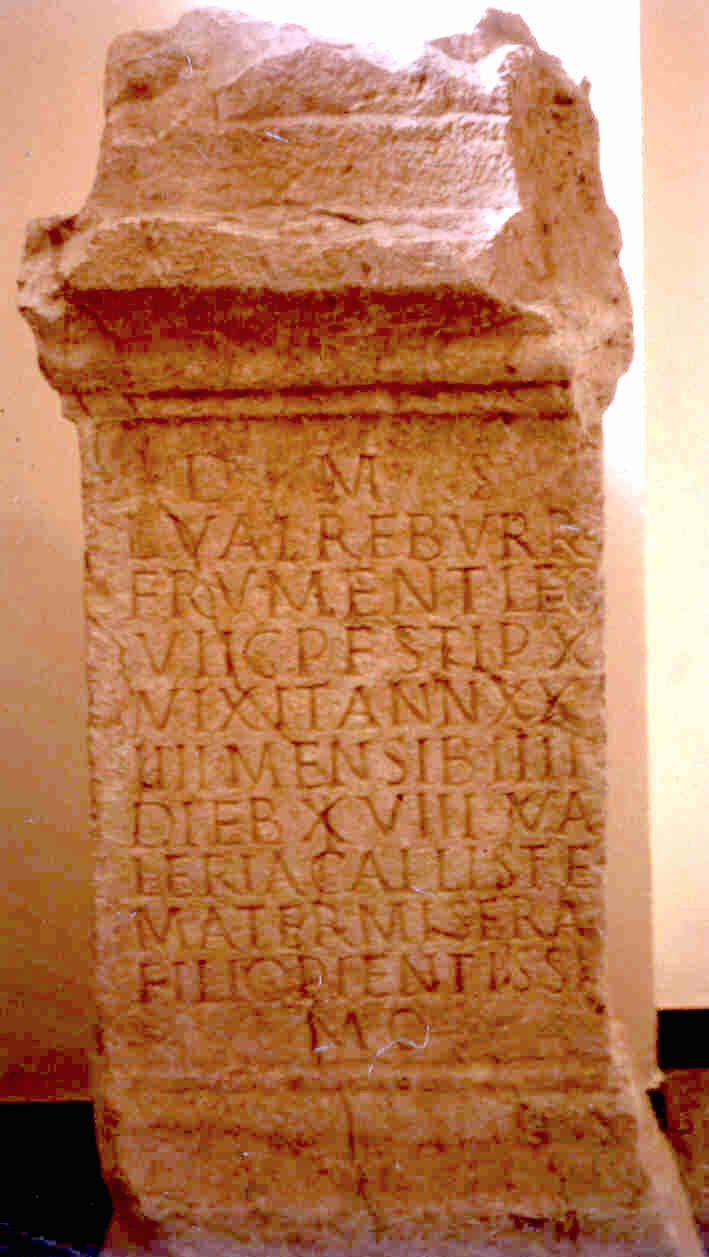
Epitaph of L. Valerius Reburrinus, frumentarius of the Legio VII Gemina, who was an important member of the governor's officium under Septimius Severus

In AD 68, Galba, who had governed the province since AD 61, was invited by Vindex to join his rebellion against Nero. When Galba received news that Nero had decided to have him killed, he accepted Vindex's offer, justifying the decision, according to Suetonius, by an oracle delivered by a young prophet two centuries earlier, which predicted that a new ruler of the world would arise in Clunia.

Therefore, Galba proclaimed himself emperor at Clunia. After receiving the support of the governor of Lusitania, the future emperor Otho, he expanded the military forces of the province, which consisted of the Legio VI Victrix, two cavalry alae, and three infantry cohortes, by recruiting various auxiliaries, at least three cohorts of Vascones, and the Legio VII Galbiana, and then he set out for Rome in order to seize power. After Galba was assassinated, the province was controlled in succession by partisans of Otho, then Vitelius, before finally coming under the control of Vespasian, the first Flavian emperor.

Under Vespasian an edict seems to have been promulgated, perhaps in AD 74, which permitted many of the province's urban communities to become municipia with Latin rights over the course of his reign and that of his successors, Titus and Domitian. Vespasian also decided to maintain a reduced military garrison in the province, consisting of the Legio VII Gemina Felix and its auxiliary units, which was focused mainly on supporting the work of the provincial governor, carrying out policing, and supervising mining work in the province.

Pliny the Elder served as procurator in Tarraconensis in AD 73.

Under Diocletian, in 293, Hispania Tarraconensis was divided in three smaller provinces: Gallaecia, Carthaginensis and Tarraconensis. The Imperial province of Hispania Tarraconensis lasted until the invasions of the 5th century, beginning in 409, when Suebi, Vandals and Alans crossed the Pyrenees, and ended with the establishment of a Visigothic kingdom.

The invasion resulted in widespread exploitation of metals, especially gold, tin and silver. The alluvial gold mines at Las Medulas show that Roman engineers worked the deposits on a very large scale using several aqueducts up to 30 miles (48 km) long to tap water in the surrounding mountains. By running fast water streams on the soft rocks, they were able to extract large quantities of gold by hydraulic mining methods (Ruina montium). When the gold had been exhausted, they followed the auriferous seams underground by tunnels using fire-setting to break up the much harder gold-bearing rocks. Pliny the Elder gives a good account of the methods used in Hispania, presumably based on his own observations.

== Geography and political organisation ==
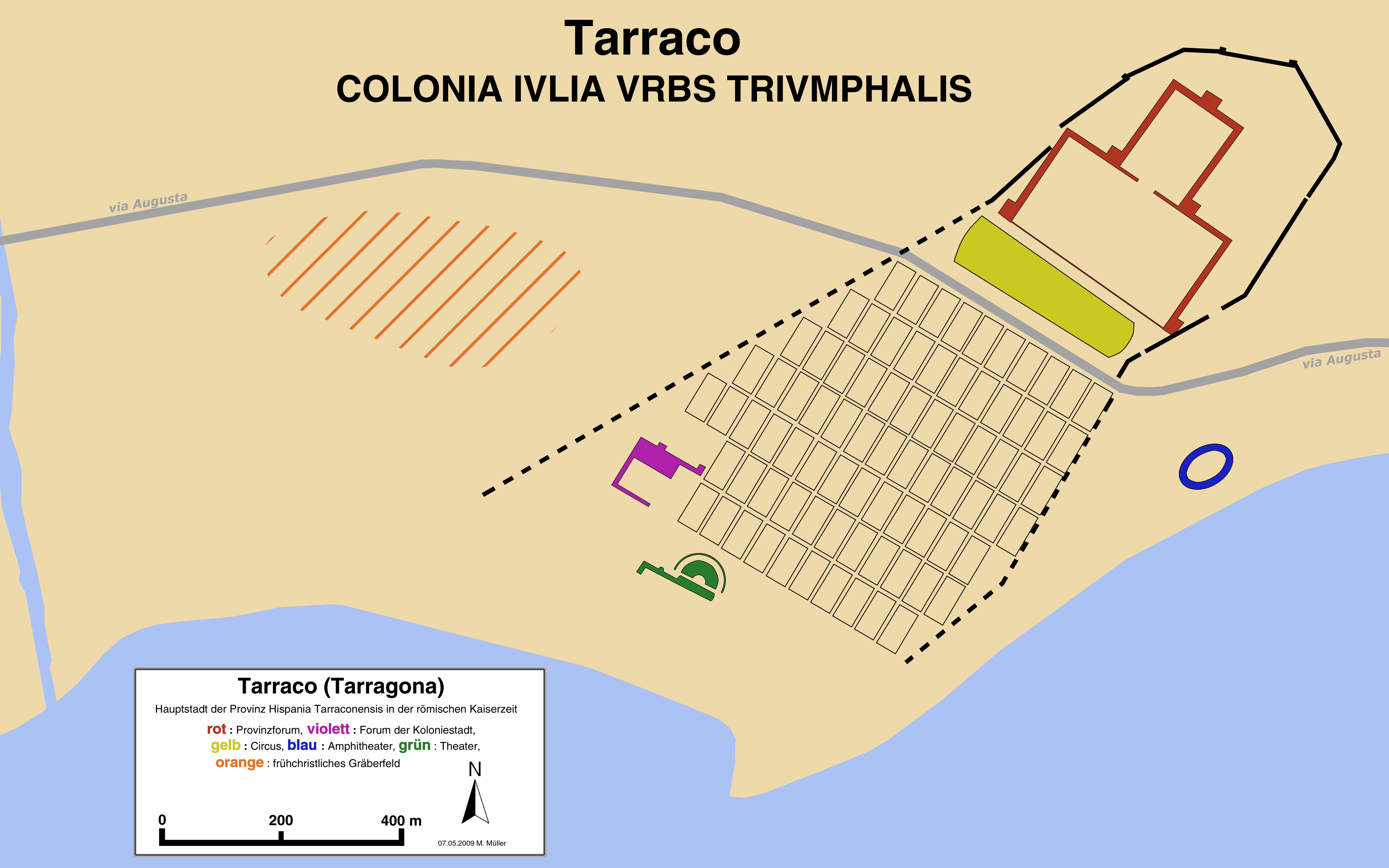
Plan of the city of Tarraco, capital of Tarraconensis

=== Borders and extent ===
At its greatest extent, the province Hispania Tarraconensis covered about two thirds of the Iberian Peninsula. The Pyrenees mountains to the north formed the border with Gaul. The border with Lusitania to the southwest ran from the Cale (modern Porto, Portugal) along the Douro river and then the Tormes river. The border with Baetica ran from Castulo (modern Linares), through Acci (Guadix), to the bay of Almería.

With a surface area of around 380,000 km^{2} (150,000 sq mi) and an estimated population of 3–3.5 million (giving an average population density of 8–9 people/km2), at the date of its creation, Tarraconensis was probably the largest province in the Roman empire.

=== Administrative organisation ===
Under Augustus' division of the provinces in 27 BC, Tarraconensis was an Imperial province like Lusitania, while Baetica was a Senatorial province. Tarraconensis was of consular rank, while the other two were praetorian. The governor was entitled legatus Augusti pro praetore, who was a senator of consular rank. The capital of the province was the colonia of Tarraco. In the time of Augustus and Tiberius, according to Strabo, the province was garrisoned by three legions – subsequently reduced to two by Caligula, and to one by Nero.

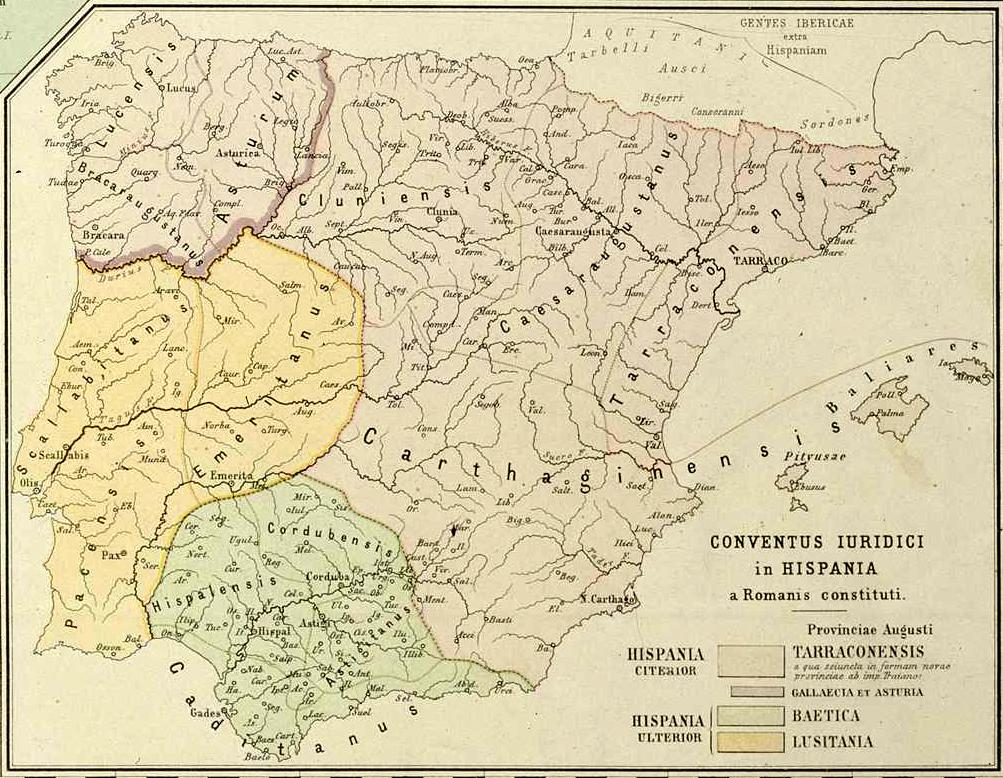
Division of Hispania into provinces and conventus

Because of the scale of the province, at some point between the reigns of Tiberius and Claudius, the province was divided into seven conventos iuridicos, 'assize districts', each managed by a legatus iuridicus appointed by the Emperor directly. These districts were:

- Tarraconensis, with its capital at Colonia Tarraco (Tarragona).
- Carthaginensis, with its capital at Colonia Carthago Nova (Cartagena).
- Caesaraugustanus, with its capital at Colonia Caesar Augusta (Zaragoza).
- Cluniensis, with its capital at Colonia Clunia Sulpicia (Coruña del Conde).
- Asturicensis, with its capital at Municipium Asturica Augusta (Astorga).
- Lucensis, with its capital at Lucus Augusti (Lugo).
- Bracarensis, with its capital at Municipium Bracara Augusta (Braga).

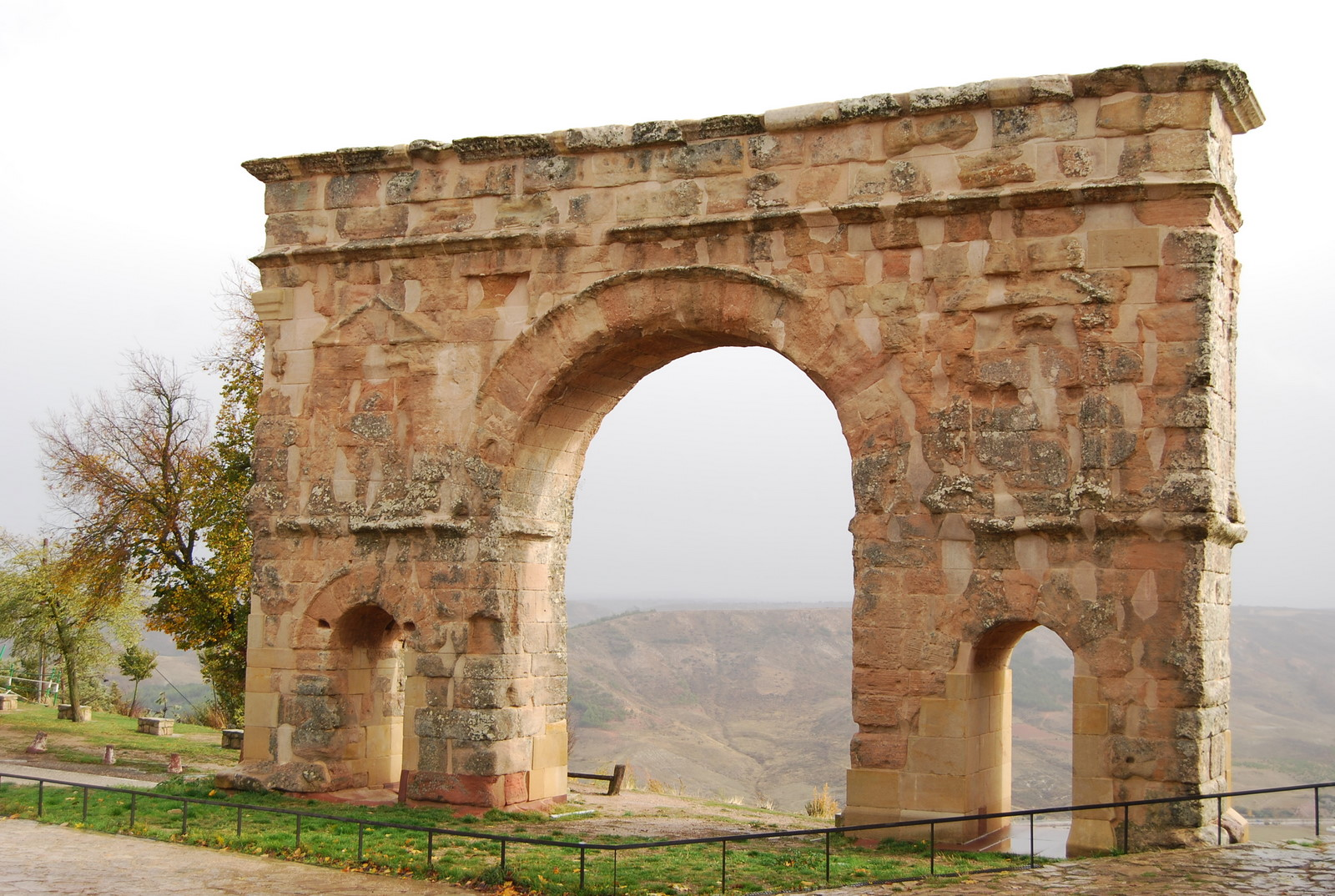
The Arch of Medinaceli, which may have marked the boundary between the Conventus Cluniensis and Caesaraugustanus

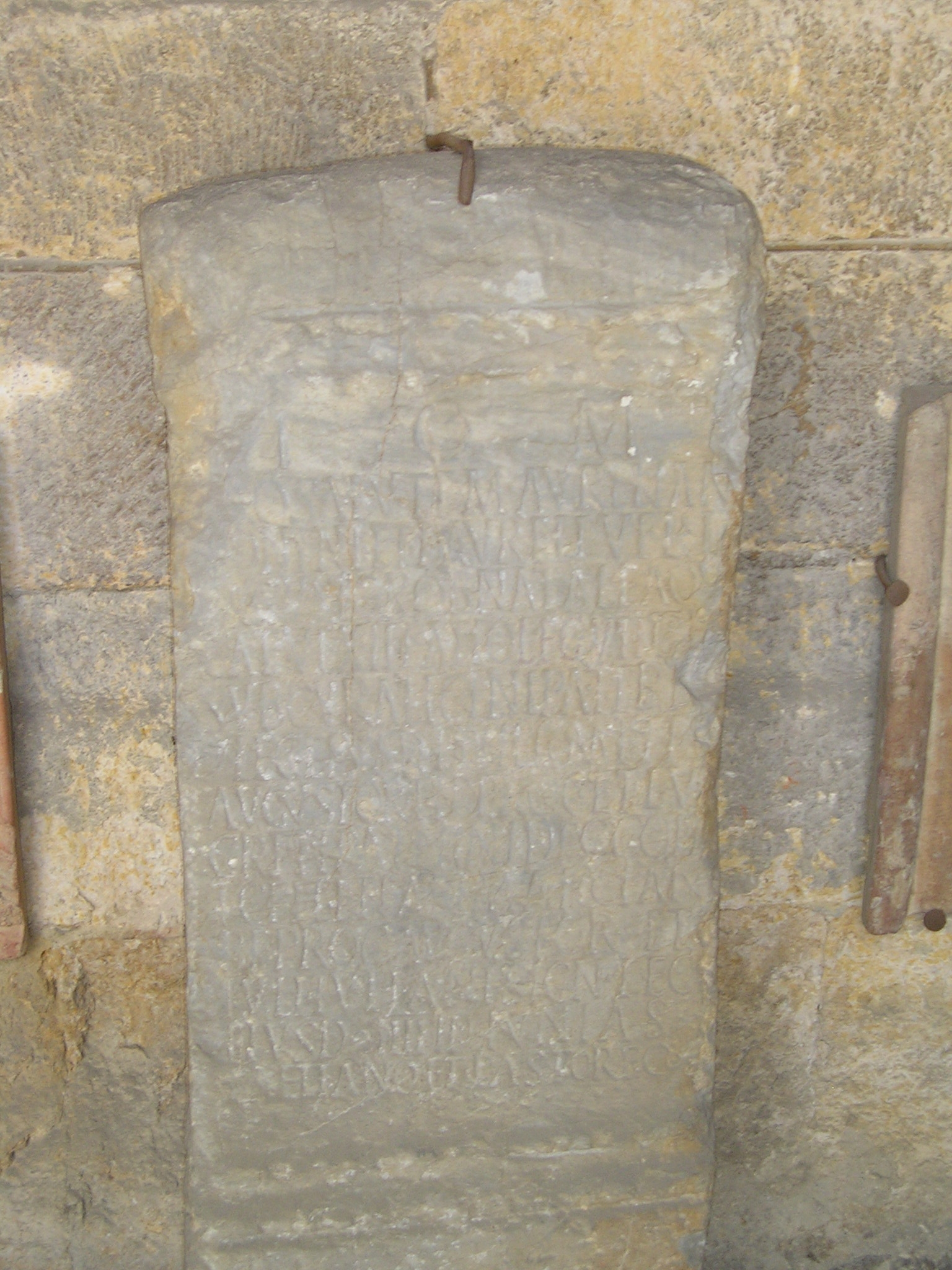
CIL II 2552, a votive inscription erected in honour of Jupiter by the Legio VII Gemina for the health of the emperors Marcus Aurelius and Lucius Verus which includes among the dedicants, the procurator metallorum, an imperial freedman called Hermes

In each of the conventus capitals there was an Imperial cult centre, dedicated to the Genius Augusti and the deified emperors, with its own male and female priests, the flamen Augusti and flamenica Augusti, who were chosen by the elites of the privileged communities of the province (the coloniae and municipia). Each year, they chose one of their number to be the flamen and flamenica (they were not required to be married to one another) of the Imperial cult for the whole province, discharging their functions in the provincial forum in Tarraco.

The fiscal administration of Tarraconensis mostly fell to an Imperial procurator (procurator Caesaris), appointed by the Emperor directly from among the equestrian order. This procurator was based in the provincial capital and managed the collection of taxes for the whole province. Nevertheless, from the late first century or early second century AD, the gold mines in the northwestern part of the province were managed by a separate procurator, the procurator metallorum, who was usually and Imperial freedman and was based at Asturica Augusta. These procurators reported directly to the emperor, not to the provincial governor, although in practice both had to collaborate with the provincial administration.

=== Urban framework ===
The lowest level of administration in the province were the cities (Latin: civitates), organised politically in the Roman manner (coloniae and municipia) or in a traditional mode retaining institutions that preceded the Roman conquest but operating under the direct supervision of the provincial governors. These communities – both Roman and indigenous – generally enjoyed a high level of autonomy, administering themselves without excessive intervention from the governors. Over time, the indigenous communities tended to adapt their institutions of self-government to match the model of the Roman municipia and coloniae. The principal difference between the two types of community was the application of Roman law to them. For citizens of coloniae and muncipia it was obligatory, while for non-Romans it was optional, except in interactions with the Imperial authorities and with individual Roman citizens, in which case Roman law over-ruled local legal systems.

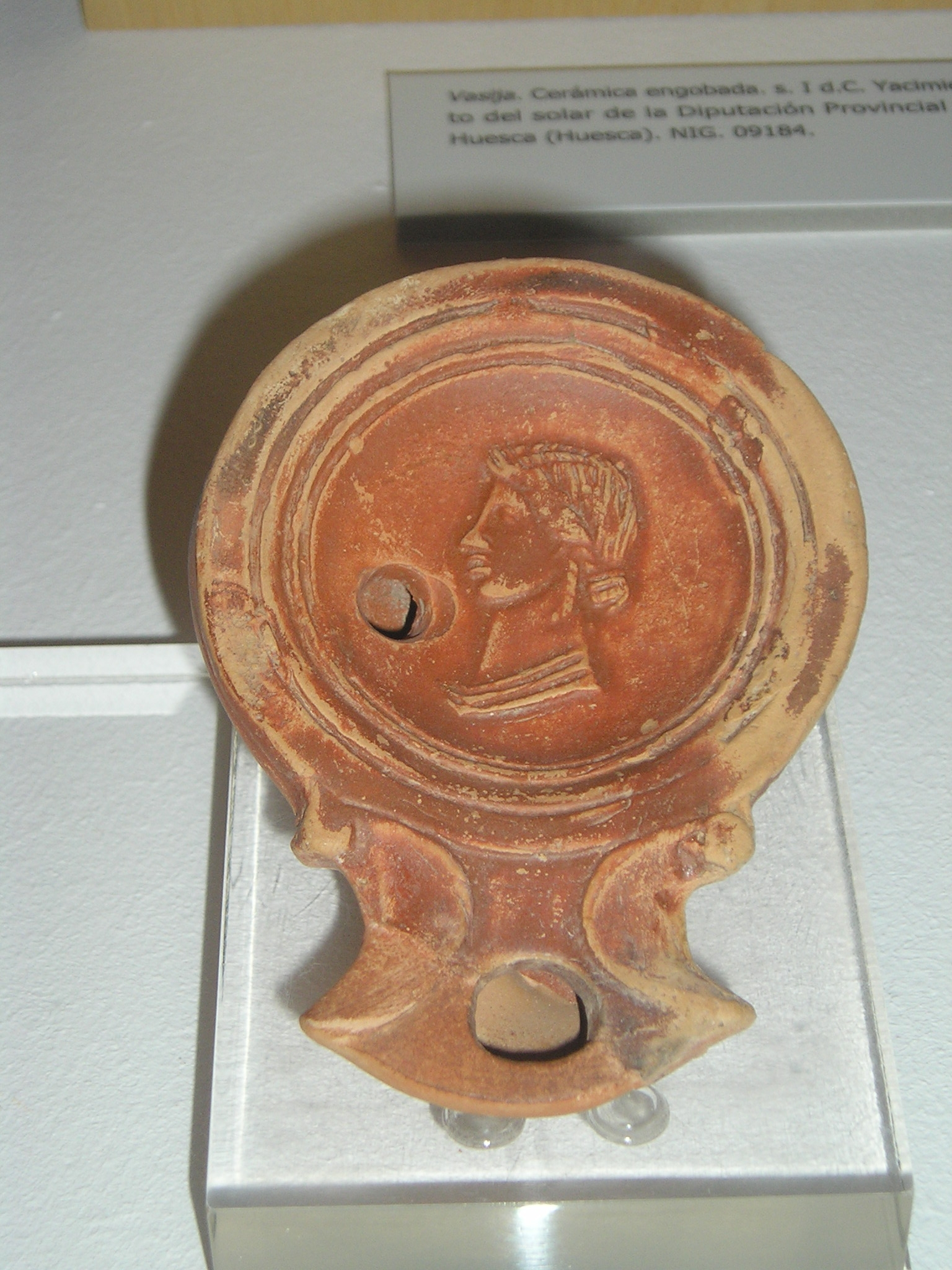
First-century AD Roman lamp from the Municipium Urbs Victrix Osca (modern Huesca)

According to Strabo, Pliny the Elder (who served as procurator the province), and Claudius Ptolemy, there was a substantial number of cities in Tarraconensis, especially in the Ebro Valley and on the Mediterranean coast, but fewer in number in the north and northwest, along the Cantabiran coast and in Galicia.

Excepting the communities on the Balearic Islands, Pliny states that:

Now, the whole province is divided into 7 conventus: Carthaginiensis, Tarraconensis, Caesaraugustus, Clunienis, Asturus, Lucensis, and Bracarus... The province itself contains (aside from the 293 communities that are subordinate to others) 179 cities, among which there are 12 coloniae, 13 cities of Roman citizens, 18 of old Latins, 1 city of foederati, and 135 cities subject to tax.

— Pliny the Elder, Naturalis Historia 3.18

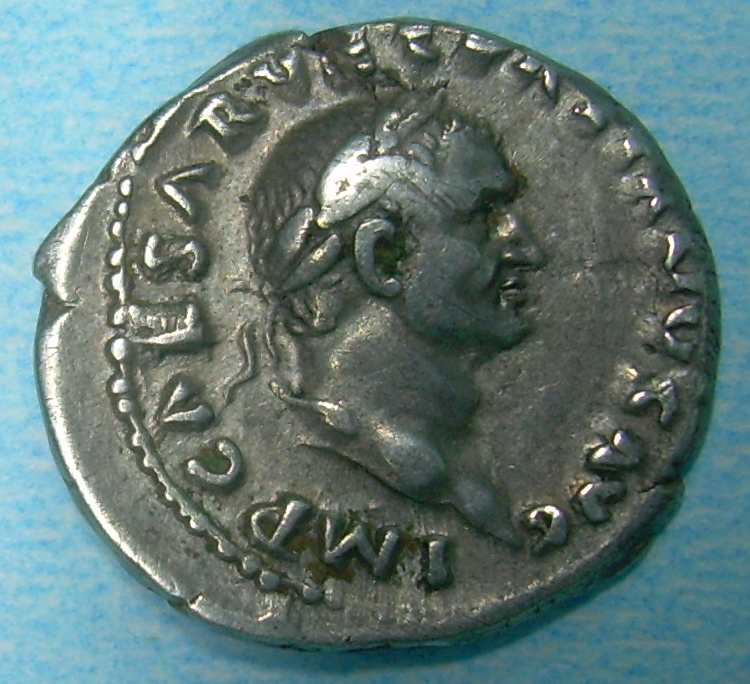
Denarius of Emperor Vespasian, who extended Latin citizenship to all communities of Hispania in the AD 70s

All free inhabitants of Roman coloniae held Roman citizenship. The coloniae in the province, established by Julius Caesar, the Second Triumvirate, or Augustus, both coloniae and municipia belonged to the Roman tribe of Galeria, except for Caesaraugusta, which was in that of Aniensis. All free men who served as municipal magistrates (duoviri or aediles) in municipia would obtain Roman citizenship, being assigned to the tribe Quirina.

According to Pliny the Elder, the Emperor Vespasian extended Latin citizenship to all other inhabitants of Hispania, which meant that they were legally permitted to conduct business under Roman law (ius commercii) and marry Roman woman (ius conubii). The date of this grant is disputed, perhaps falling shortly after his accession to power in AD 69 or in AD 74. The concession of this right was used by many tributary and subordinate communities in Tarraconensis to transform themselves into municipia, e.g. Nova Augusta (Lara de los Infantes, Burgos), Bergidum Flavium (Torre del Bierzo, El Bierzo, León), Segovia, Duratón (Segovia), and Aqua Flaviae (Chaves, Portugal).

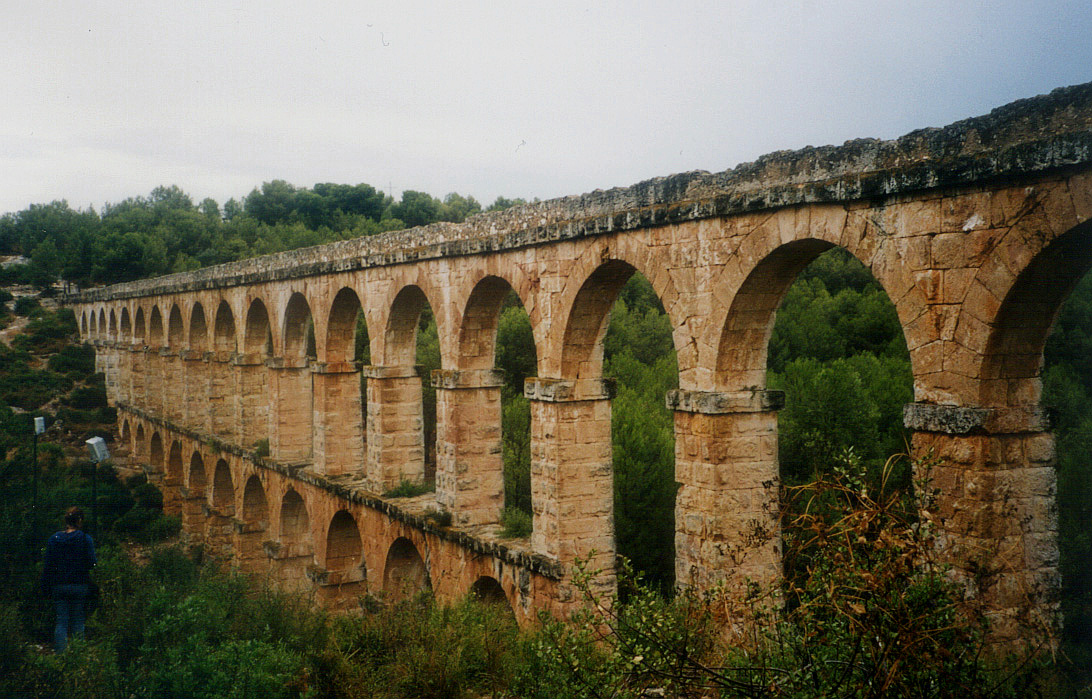
Les Ferreres Aqueduct, built under Augustus to supply water to the provincial capital, Tarraco

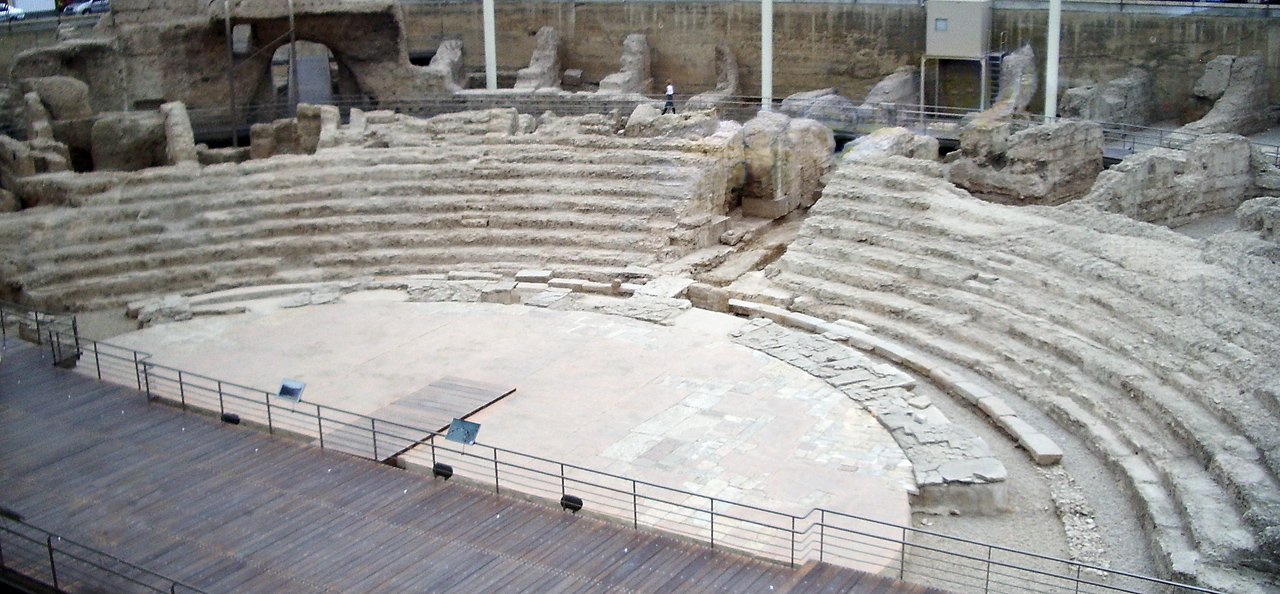
Roman Theater of Zaragoza, capital of a conventus iuridicus, built under Augustus and Tiberius

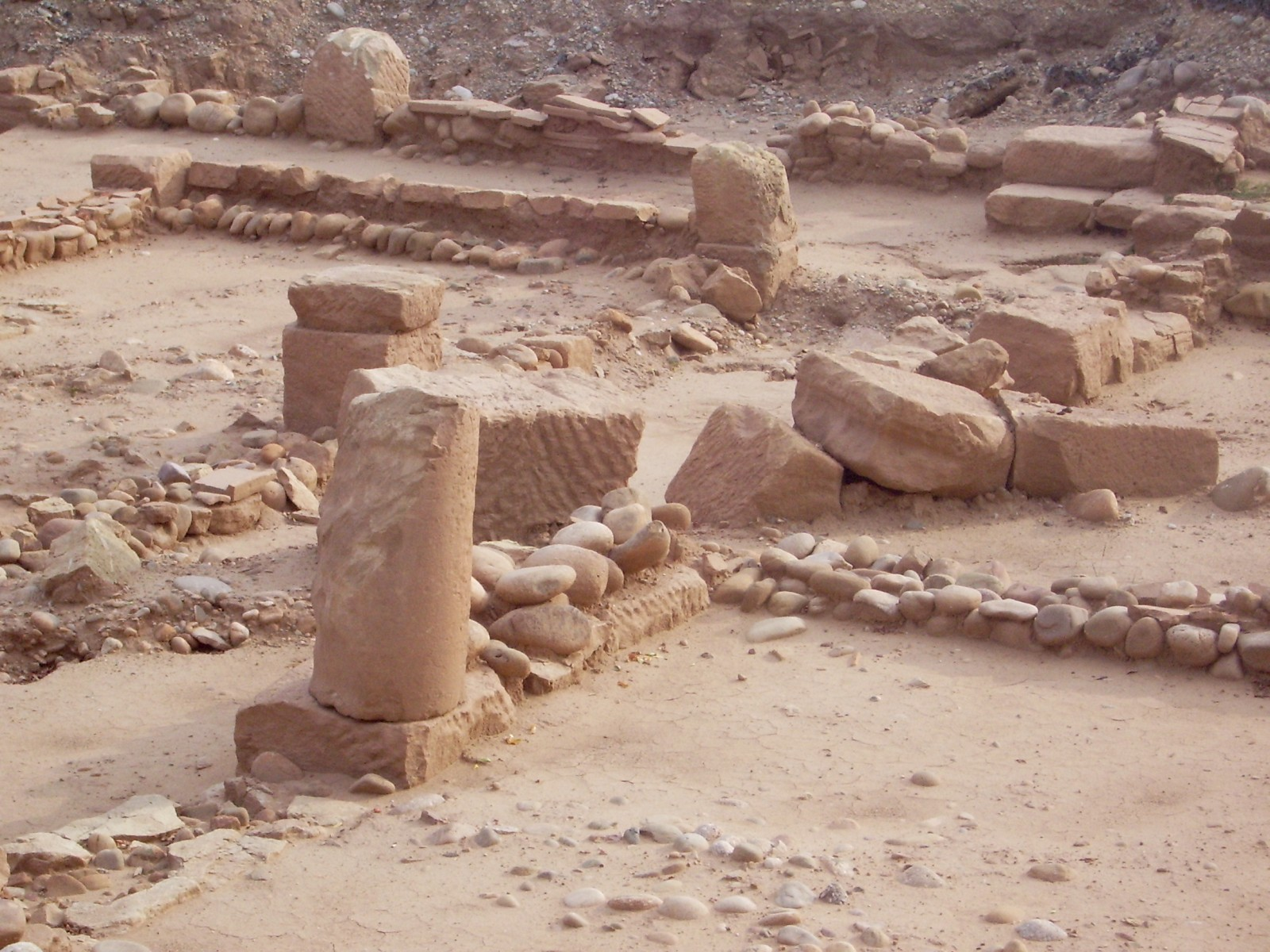
Remains of a Roman house at Vareia (Logroño)

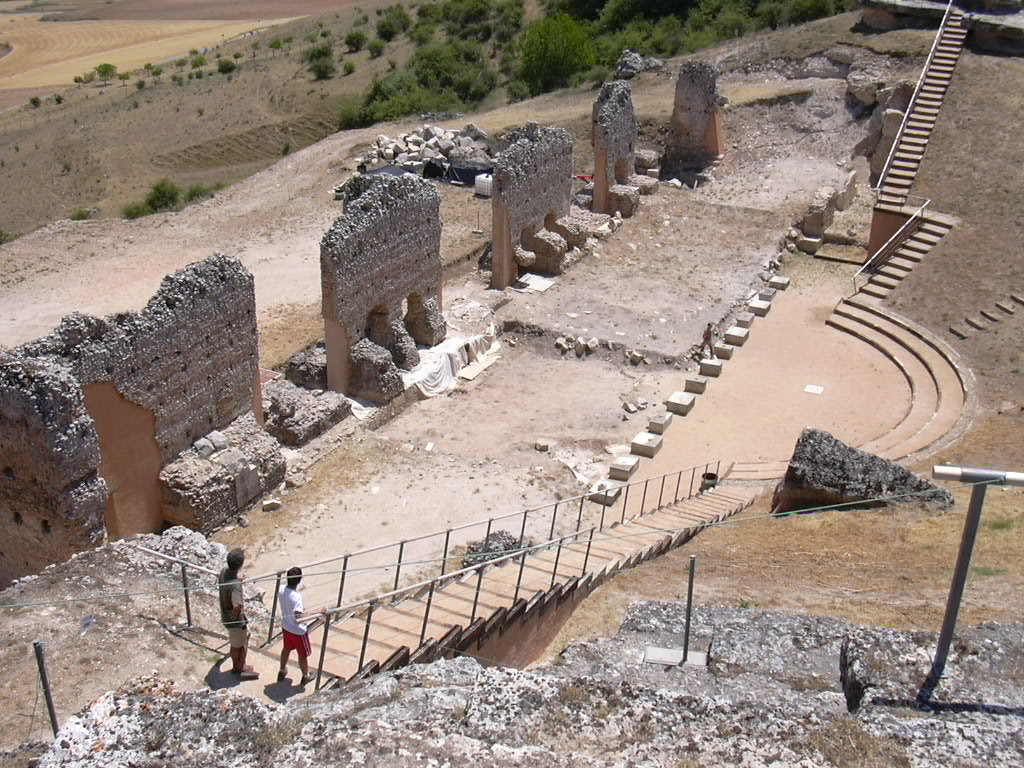
Theatre of Clunia Sulpicia, built by Tiberius in the most important city of Duero basin, capital of the largest conventus iuridicus in Hispania

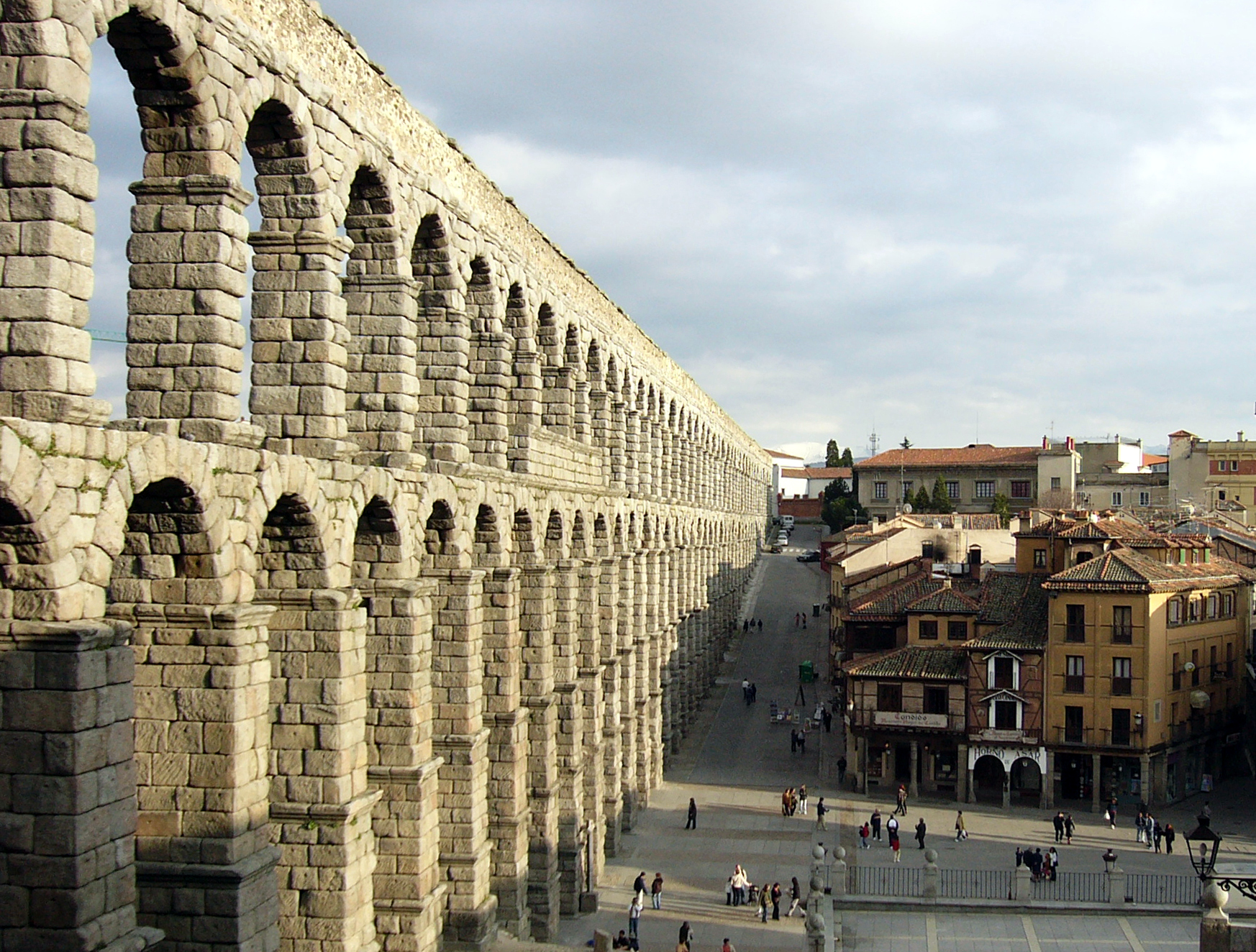
Aqueduct of Segovia, built by Domitian

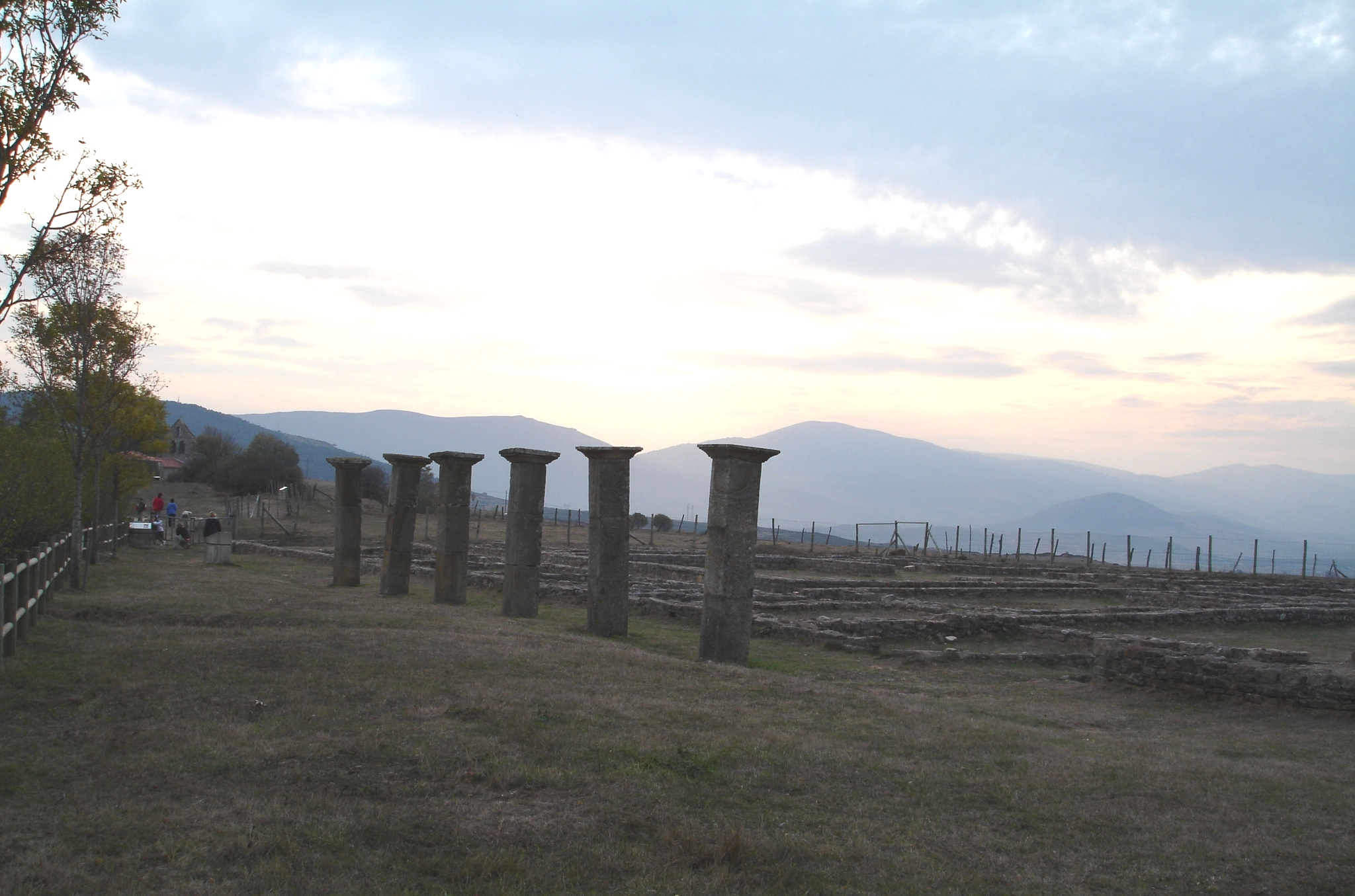
Detail of the remains of Iuliobriga, the most important city in Roman Cantabria, showing the columns of the stoas which ran along the decumanus maximus

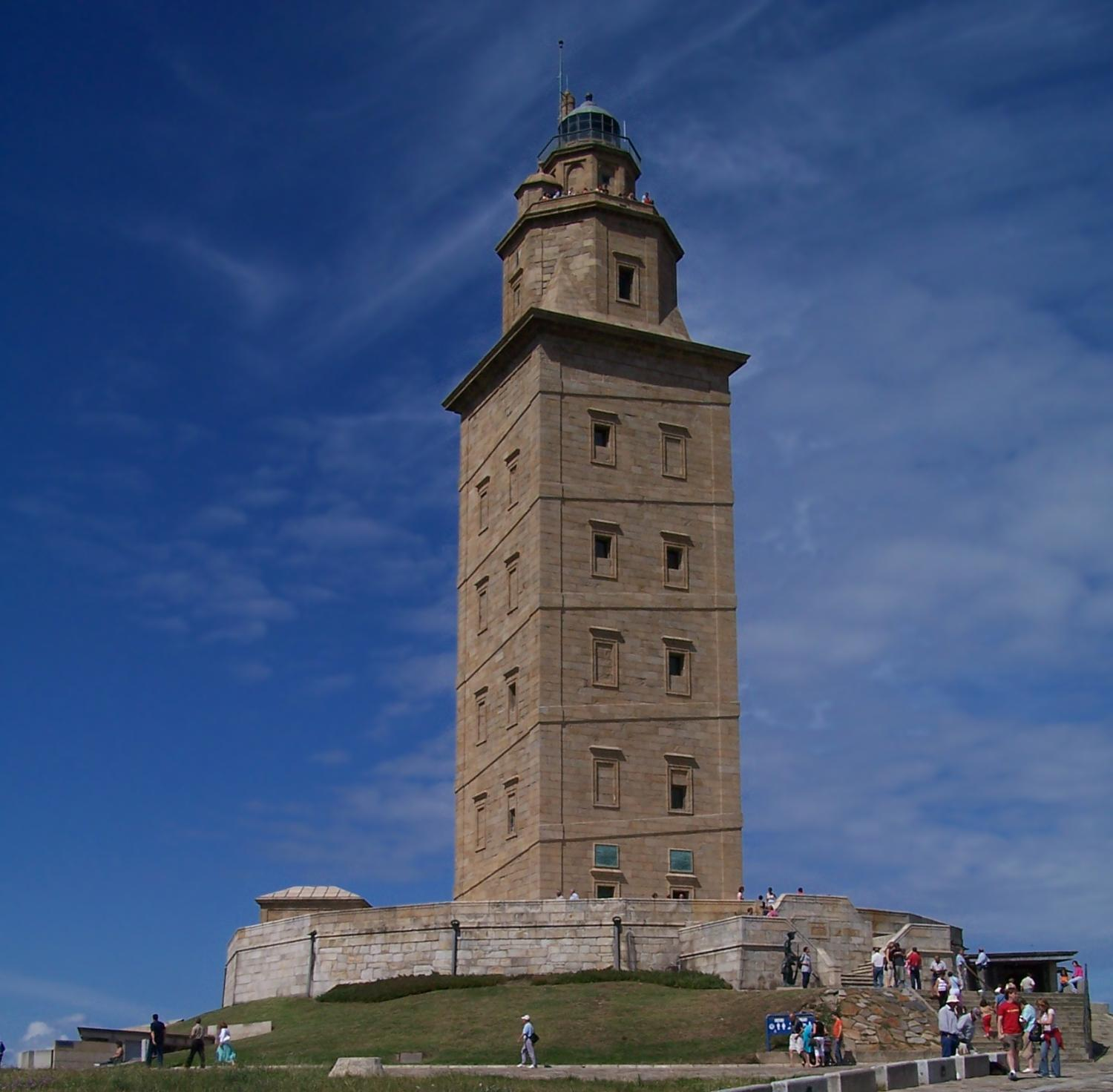
Tower of Hercules, a Roman lighthouse built in the second century AD at the Municipium Flavium Brigantium in A Coruña

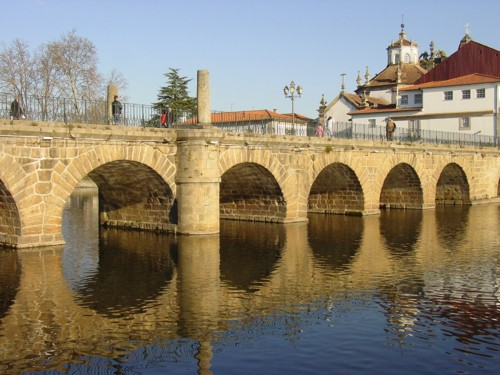
Roman Bridge of Chaves at Aqua Flaviae. The cadrao dos pobos inscription indicates that its construction was funded by ten local communities with the aid of the Legio VII Gemina.

The main cities in the province were:

Conventus Tarraconensis
Name	Modern name	Status	Established by
Tarraco	Tarragona	Colonia	Julius Caesar and Augustus
Barcino	Barcelona	Colonia	Julius Caesar and Augustus
Iesso	Guissona, Lleida	Municipium	Flavian dynasty
Aeso	Isona i Conca Dellà, Lleida	Municipium	Flavian dynasty
Iulia Libica	Llívia, Girona	Municipium	Julius Caesar
Ausa	Vic, Barcelona	Municipium	Augustus
Baetulo	Badalona, Barcelona	Municipium	Augustus
Iluro	Mataró, Barcelona	municipium	Julius Caesar
Emporiae	Empúries, Girona	Colonia	Julius Caesar
Gerunda	Girona	Municipium	Augustus
Dertosa	Tortosa, Tarragona	Municipium	Augustus
Valentia	Valencia	Municipium	Augustus
Saguntum	Sagunt, Valencia	municipium	Julius Caesar
Edeta	Llíria, Valencia	Municipium	Augustus
Conventus Caesaraugustanus
Name	Modern name	Status	Established by
Ilerda	Lleida	Muncipium	Augustus
Osca	Huesca	Muncipium	Augustus
Iaca	Jaca, Huesca	Municipium?	
Labitolosa	La Puebla de Castro, Huesca	Municipium	Flavian dynasty
Caesar Augusta	Zaragoza	Colonia	Augustus
Augusta Bilbilis	Calatayud, Zaragoza	Municipium	Augustus
Turiaso	Tarazona, Zaragoza	Municipium	Augustus
Celsa	Velilla de Ebro, Zaragoza	Colonia	Second Triumvirate
Bursau	Borja, Zaragoza	Municipium	Flavian dynasty
Arcobriga	Monreal de Ariza, Zaragoza		
Osicerda	La Puebla de Híjar, Teruel	Municipium	Augustus
Segontia	Sigüenza, Guadalajara	Municipium	Flavian dynasty
Pompaelo	Pamplona, Navarra	Municipium	Julius Caesar
Cara	Santacara, Navarra		
Andelos	Mendigorría, Navarra		
Vareia	Logroño, La Rioja	Municipium	Augustus
Tritium Magallum	Tricio, La Rioja	Municipium	Flavian dynasty
Libia	Herramélluri, La Rioja	Municipium?	Flavian dynasty?
Graccurris	Alfaro, La Rioja	Municipium	Augustus
Cascantum	Cascante, Navarra	Municipium	Augustus
Calagurris	Calahorra, La Rioja	Municipium	Julius Caesar
Oiasso	Irún, Guipúzcoa	Municipium?	
Veleia	Iruña de Oca, Province of Álava	Municipium	Augustus
Ercavica	Cañaveruelas, Cuenca	Municipium	Augustus
Complutum	Alcalá de Henares, Province of Madrid	Municipium	Augustus
Conventus Carthaginensis
Name	Modern name	Status	Established by
Carthago Nova	Cartagena, Murcia	Colonia	Julius Caesar
Saetabi	Xàtiva, Valencia	Municipium	Augustus
Illici	Elche, Alicante	Colonia	Augustus
Dianum	Denia, Alicante	Municipium	Augustus
Lucentum	Alicante	Municipium	Augustus
Toletum	Toledo	Municipium	Augustus
Begastri	Cehegín, Murcia	Municipium?	Flavian dynasty?
Libisosa	Lezuza, Albacete	Colonia	Augustus
Salaria	Úbeda, Jaén	Colonia	Augustus
Sisapo	Almodóvar del Campo, Ciudad Real	Municipium	Augustus
Ilugo	Venta de San Andrés, Santisteban del Puerto, Jaén	Municipium	Flavian dynasty
Castulo	Linares, Jaén	Municipium	Julius Caesar
Acci	Guadix, Granada	Colonia	Augustus
Valeria	Valeria, Cuenca	Municipium	Augustus
Titulciam	Titulcia, Madrid	Municipium	Flavian dynasty
Segobriga	Saelices, Cuenca	Municipium	Augustus
Conventus Cluniensis
Name	Modern name	Status	Established by
Flaviobriga	Castro-Urdiales, Cantabria	Colonia	Vespasian
Portus Victoriae Iuliobrigensium	Santander o Santoña (Cantabria)	Municipium?	Flavian
Portus Blendium	Suances, Cantabria	Municipium?	
Juliobriga	Retortillo, near Reinosa, Cantabria	Municipium	Flavian
Clunia	Peñalba de Castro, Burgos	Municipium; Colonia	Tiberius; Vespasian
Occilis	Medinaceli, Soria	Municipium?	Flavian
Numantia	Numancia, Soria	Municipium?	Flavian
Termentia	Montejo de Tiermes, Soria	Municipium	Tiberius
Uxama Argaela	El Burgo de Osma, Soria	Municipium	Tiberius
Augustobriga	Muro de Ágreda, Soria	Municipium?	Flavian?
Palantia	Palencia	Municipium?	Flavian?
Pintia	Padilla de Duero, Valladolid	Municipium?	
Intercatia	Montealegre de Campos, Valladolid	Municipium?	Flavian?
Albocela	Villalazán, Zamora	Municipium?	Augustus?
Septimanca	Simancas, Valladolid		
Rauda	Roa, Burgos	Municipium?	Flavian?
Deobrigula	Tardajos, Burgos	Municipium	Flavian?
Virovesca	Briviesca, Burgos	Municipium?	
Deobriga	Miranda de Ebro, Burgos	Municipium?	Augustus?
Segisama Iulia	Sasamón, Burgos	Municipium	Flavian
Nova Augusta	Lara de los Infantes, Burgos	Municipium	Flavian
Cauca	Coca, Segovia	Municipium	Flavian
Confluenta	Duratón, Segovia	Municipium	Flavian
Segovia	Segovia	Municipium	Flavian
Brigeco	Dehesa de Morales de las Cuevas, Castrogonzalo, Zamora	Municipium	Flavian
Conventus Asturicensis
Name	Modern name	Status	Established by
Gigia	Gijón, Asturias	Municipium?	Flavian?
Lucus Asturum	Lugo de Llanera, Asturias		
Flavionavia	Pravia, Asturias?	Municipium?	Flavian?
Asturica Augusta	Astorga, León	Municipium?	Augustus?
	León	cannaba of Legio VI Victrix and then Legio VII Gemina	
Lancia	Villasabariego, León	Municipium	Flavian
Bedunia	San Martín de Torres, León		
Bergidum Flavium	Cacabelos, León	Municipium	Flavian
Interamnium Flavium	Bembibre, León	Municipium	Flavian
Petavonium	Rosinos de Vidriales, Zamora	cannaba of Legio X Gemina and of Ala II Flavia Hispanorum, later Municipium?	
Conventus Lucensis
Name	Modern name	Status	Established by
Ardobicum Coronium	A Coruña	Municipium	Flavian
Flavium Brigantium	Betanzos, A Coruña?	Municipium	Flavian
Iria Flavia	Padrón, A Coruña	Municipium	Flavian
Vico Spacorum	Vigo, Pontevedra	Municipium	Flavian
Lucus Augusti	Lugo	Municipium?	Augustus?
Conventus Bracaraugustanorum
Name	Modern name	Status	Established by
Municipium Limicorum	Xinzo de Limia, Ourense	Municipium	Flavian
Bracara Augusta	Braga, Portugal	Municipium?	Augustus?
Aquae Flaviae	Chaves, Portugal	Municipium	Flavian
Cale and Portum Cale	Porto, Portugal	Municipium?	

=== Roman military garrisons ===
In order to guarantee order and security in the province after the Cantabrian Wars (26–19 BC), three legions were established in the province:

- Legio VI Victrix, in Leon until transferred to Germania Inferior;
- Legio X Gemina in Petavonium until transferred to Pannonia in AD 63;
- Legio IV Macedonica in Pisoraca until transferred to Germania in AD 43.

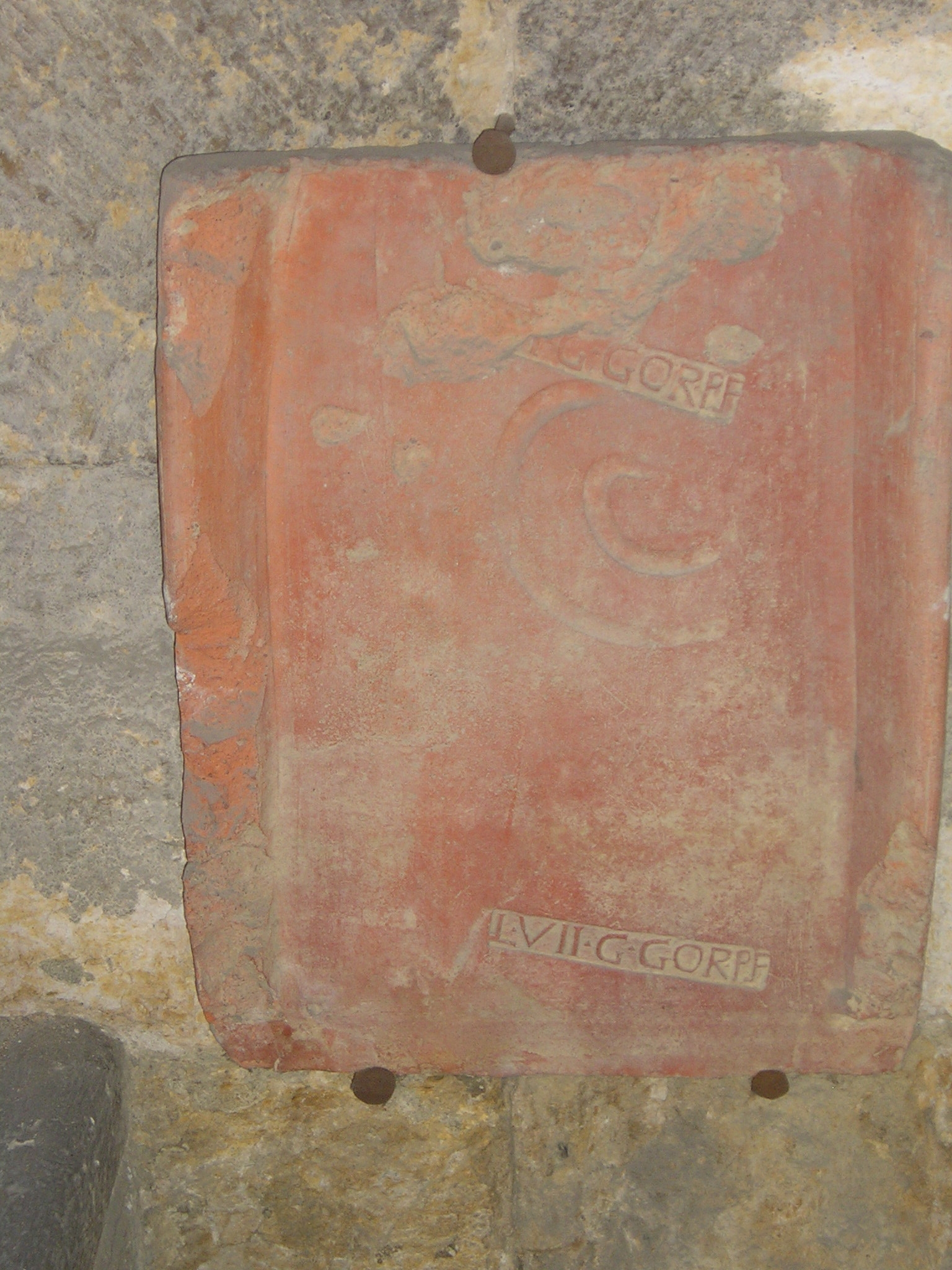
Tile inscribed L(egio) VII G(emina) GORD(iana) P(ia) F(elix), produced by the Legio, which indicates the presence of the Legio VII Gemina in Tarraconensis in the 3rd century AD

Hispania under Hadrian (AD 117–138), with the location of the castra legionis VII Geminae, with the principle locations for the extraction of precious metals and the main roads

These legions were supported by various auxiliary units, like the Ala Parthorum and the Cohors IV Gallorum, but it is very difficult to tell exactly where and when these units were garrisoned in the peninsula.

In AD 68, according to Suetonius, Galba removed one legion, the Legio VI Vitrix, two cavalry alae, and three infantry cohortes. In order to reinforce these troops, a new legion was recruited, the future Legio VII Gemina and a number of similar auxiliary units, notably the Vascones cohortes, but all these units joined Galba when he invaded Italy to seize the Imperial throne.

In AD 69, Vitellius ordered the Legio X Gemina to be dispatched to the Iberian peninsula, accompanied by the Legio I Adiutrix. We do not know exactly where they were stationed; it may have been in Baetica and the southeastern part of Tarraconensis to prevent a possible invasion from North Africa, which was controlled by Lucius Clodius Macer. In any case, both legions and the Legio VI Victrix abandoned Vitellius and declared their support for Vespasian, who quickly sent them to Germania Inferior to suppress the revolt of Gaius Julius Civilis.

Subsequently, in AD 74, Vespasian ordered the Legio VII Gemina to be garrisoned in Leon at the site of the old camp of the Legio VI Victrix. The Legio VII Gemina continued to garrison the province until the beginning of the 5th century AD.

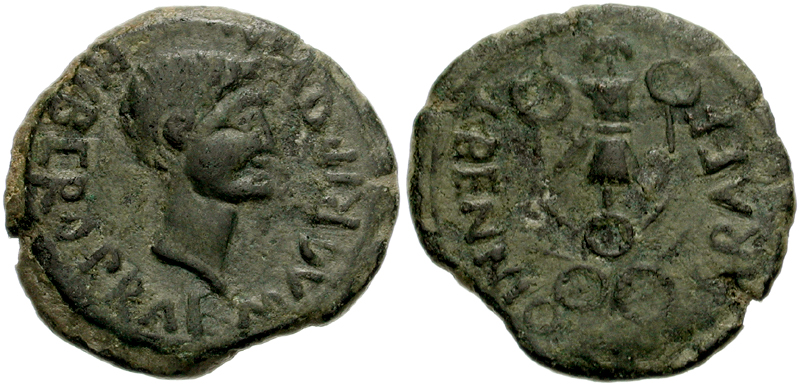
Semis minted at Carthago Nova under Augustus, dedicated to Marcus Vipsanius Agrippa, with a trophy on the reverse, celebrating Agrippa's victory over the Cantabrians and the Asturians. The coin indicates the economic power of the province and the Cartagena mining region.

The Legio VII Gemina dispatched vexillationes to the following parts of the provinces in Hispania:

- Tarraco, serving the governor of Hispania Tarraconensis;
- Augusta Emerita, serving the governor of the province of Lusitania;
- In the mining area around Birgidum to supervise the extraction of mineral ore and its transportation;
- In the mining area in the north of Portugal, to supervise the extraction of gold ore and its transportation;
- In Tritium Magallum (Tricio, La Rioja) to manage the portorium of this pottery production centre;
- In Lucus Augusti (Lugo) to manage the portorium;
- In Segisama (Sasamón, Burgos) at the statio, controlling the road towards Burdigala.

By the last quarter of the 1st century AD at the latest, five auxiliary units of the Legio VII Gemina were stationed in the province:

- Ala II Flavia Hispanorum civium romanorum, a cavalry ala stationed at Petavonium;
- Cohors I Celtiberorum Equitata civium romanorum, a cavalry cohors, based at Sobrado dos Monxes (A Coruña), in the territory of the Municipum Flavium Brigantia;
- Cohors I Galica Equitata civium romanorum, encamped at Pisoraca (Herrera de Pisuerga, Palencia);
- Cohors III Lucensium, based at Lucus Augusti (Lugo);
- Cohors II Galica, located at the unknown site, ad cohortem Galicam

This arrangement endured from the 2nd century through to the fifth century AD, with the maximum garrison of Roman troops in Hispanis never exceeding a total of 7712 soldiers.

== See also ==
- List of Roman governors of Hispania Tarraconensis
- Pre-Roman peoples of the Iberian Peninsula
- Asturica Augusta
- Libisosa
