= Legio IV Macedonica =

Roman legion

Fourth Legion Macedonica
- Legio IV Macedonica; Legio Quarta Macedonica
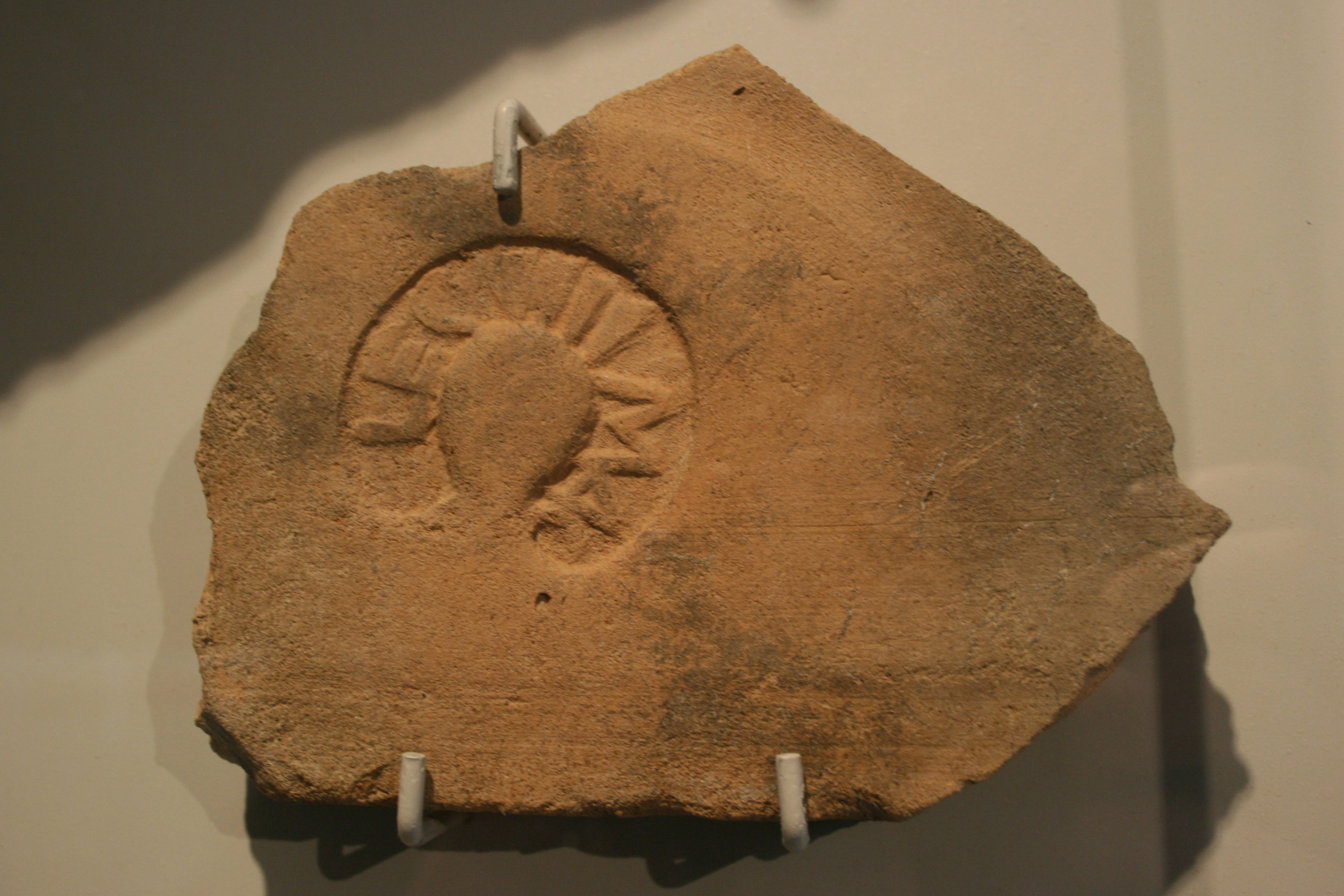
- Brick stamp LEG IV MAC found in Rheinzabern
- Active: 48 BCE until the 4th century
- Country: Roman Republic (closing years) and Roman Empire
- Type: Roman legion

Legio IV Macedonica ("Fourth Legion Macedonian," also written Legio IIII), was a legion of the Imperial Roman army founded in 48 BC by Gaius Julius Caesar (dictator of Rome 49–44 BC) with Italian legionaries. The legion was disbanded in AD 70 by Emperor Vespasian. The legion symbols were a bull (as with all of Caesar's legions) and a capricorn.

== History ==
=== Early history ===
This legion was possibly founded in Italy during the 48 BCE Julius Caesar, who needed it in his war against Pompey. It saw its first action at the Battle of Dyrrhachium. After the civil war the legion was stationed in Macedonia. It was supposed to serve in Caesar's campaign against the Parthian Empire. However, the expedition was canceled after Caesar's death. This legion would go onto fight in the civil war between Antony and Augustus. Before the conflict erupted, the legion was moved to Italy by Mark Antony, although this did not deter them from siding with Augustus during the Battle of Mutina, where they fought against Antony and suffered heavy losses. In 42 BC, the legion fought at the Battle of Philippi and returned to the Italy with Augustus. It was nearly destroyed at the Battle of Phillipi, however it survived to be rebuilt. Likely resulting in the name Macedonica. They were subsequently present at the siege of Perugia in the winter of 41 BC, where Lucius Antonius, Mark Antony's brother, had taken refuge. The legion was also present at the Battle of Actium in 31 BC.

=== Cantabrian Wars ===
After Augustus became Emperor, in 30 BC it was moved to Juliobriga in Hyspania Tarraconensis to fight the Cantabrian Wars. After the war the soldiers continued to serve as civil servants in Hispania.

=== Early service in Germania ===
Emperor Claudius likely transferred the legion to Mainz in Germania Superior to replace the XIV Gemina. Probably in 41 AD.However. Some people think that the legion was transferred in 39 AD, when emperor Caligula waged war against the Germanic Chatti. While stationed in Germania the Fourth shared the fortress with the recently founded XXII Primigenia. The younger unit occupied the less honorable left-hand side, whereas IV Macedonica was living in the right-hand side.

=== Year of Four Emperors ===
During the Year of Four Emperors the Fourth legion were among the first to side with Vitellius. Soldiers of this took part in Vitellius' march to Italy. It conquered the road through Switzerland, fought at Cremona and Bedriacum against the troops of the emperor Otho. Several of its soldiers were rewarded for their service. Later they were defeated by Vespasian.

=== Later service in Germania ===
Meanwhile, in Germania Inferior, the Batavians revolted. During the revolt the IV Macedonica guarded Mainz against attacks by Germanic Chatti, Usipetes and Mattiaci. Although it had been successful during the campaign, it was regarded with some suspicion by the new emperor. Because of this it was punished, reconstituted under a new name, IV Flavia Felix, and given a new symbol, the lion. The lion was related to Hercules, Vespasian's favorite deity.

=== After Germania ===
The new Legio IV Macedonica was moved to Burnum, a Roman military camp in Dalmatia. It would remain there until 70 CE. In the year 85 CE, the legion was transferred to Singudunum, Moesia. The legion would also be transferred to Syria by general Corbulo. During the reign of Domitian, it fought against the Alemmani and Dacians. Later it fought in Trajan's Dacian Wars. The Legio IV Macedonica would remain in Singudunum for the next 200 years. Afterwards it disappears from history.

== Epigraphic inscriptions ==
- - Caius Valerius Cai filius Voltinia (tribu) Donatus miles legionis IIII Macedonicae annorum XXXIX hic (...). Logrono, Spain. Hisp. Epi. 14626.

== Attested members ==
Name	Rank	Time Frame	Source
Lucius Blattius	Centurio	Flavian Dynasty	
Lucius Martius Macer	Legatus	Unknown	

== See also ==
- List of Roman legions
