= List of Roman governors of Hispania Tarraconensis =

List of governors of Hispania Tarraconensis, also known as Hispania Citerior. This imperial province was created from Hispania Ulterior in 27 BC, and existed until AD 293 when Diocletian divided it into 3 smaller provinces.

Legati pro praetore or governors of Hispania Tarraconensis
Date	Prefect
24 - 22 BC	Lucius Aelius Lamia
22 - 19 BC	Gaius Furnius
19 - 17 BC	Publius Silius Nerva
13 - 9 BC	Marcus Licinius Crassus
c. 3 BC	Paullus Fabius Maximus
AD 9/10	Gnaeus Calpurnius Piso
13 - 20	Marcus Aemilius Lepidus
c. 25	Lucius Calpurnius Piso
25 - 31	Lucius Arruntius
c. 41	Appius Junius Silanus
60 - 68	Servius Sulpicius Galba
68 - 69	Cluvius Rufus
70 - 73	Titus Aurelius Fulvus
73/74	Lucius Junius Quintus Vibius Crispus
74 - 78	Marcus Arrecinus Clemens
78 - 81	Gaius Calpetanus Rantius Quirinalis Valerius Festus
between 81 & 85	Quintus Pomponius Rufus ?
85 - 90	Gaius Catellius Celer
99 - 102	Aulus Cornelius Palma Frontonianus
between 119 & 138	Marcus Lollius Paulinus Decimus Valerius Asiaticus Saturninus
between 130 & 138	Junius Homullus
before 145	Cornelius Priscianus
between 145 & 161	Lucius Venuleius Apronianus Octavius Priscus
c. 161 - c. 164	Salvius Julianus
c. 164 - c. 167	Titus Pomponius Proculus Vitrasius Pollio
171 - 172	Gaius Aufidius Victorinus
c. 186 - c. 189	Pollienus Auspex
189 - 192	Quintus Hedius Rufus Lollianus Gentianus
c. 192 - c. 197	Lucius Novius Rufus
197 - 198	Tiberius Claudius Candidus
between 198 & 209	Marcus Maecius Probus
between 198 & 209	Titus Flavius Titianus
211/212 or 209/212	Marcus Nummius Umbius Primus Senecio
c. 214 - 217	Gaius Julius Cerealis
between 198 & 217	Junius Faustinus (Placidus ?) Postumianus
between 222 & 235	Quintus Atrius Clonius
before 235 ?	Lucius Domitius Gallicanus Papinianus
