= Clunia =

Ancient Roman city

- Colonia Clunia Sulpicia
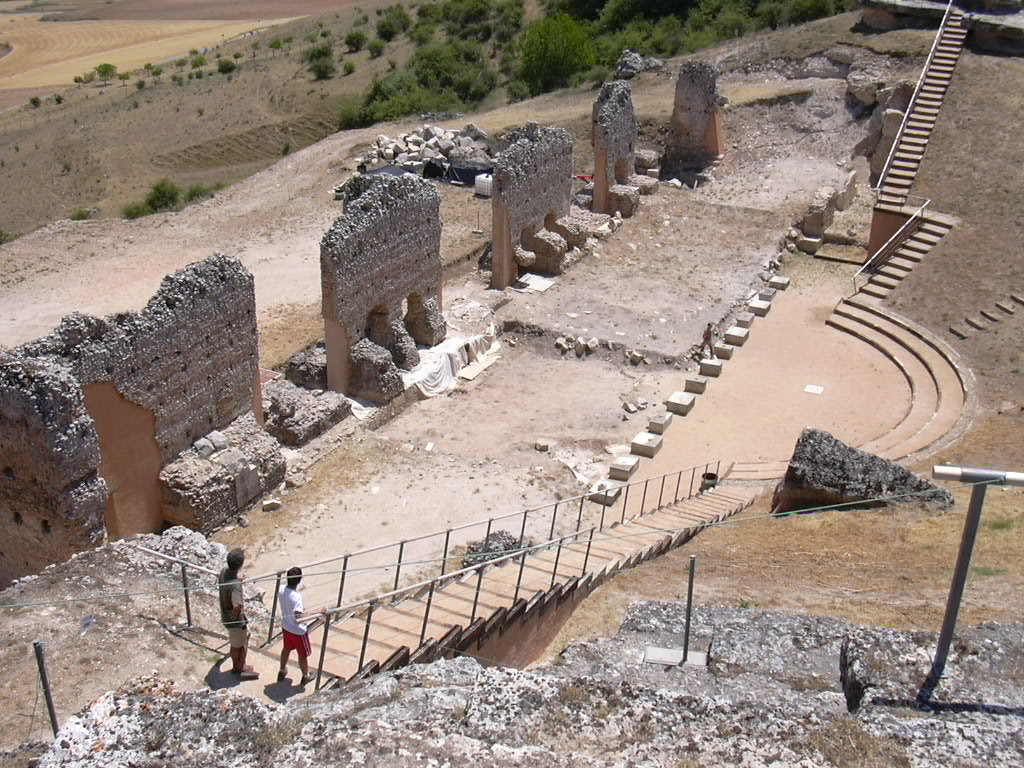
- Theater of Clunia.

- Location within Spain
- 41°46′50″N 03°22′14″W
- Type: Settlement
- Location: Peñalba de Castro, Province of Burgos, Castile and León, Spain

Site notes
- Website: Spain.info

Clunia (full name Colonia Clunia Sulpicia) was an ancient Roman city. Its remains are located on Alto de Castro, at more than 1,000 metres (3,300 ft) above sea level, between the villages of Peñalba de Castro and Coruña del Conde, 2 km away from the latter, in the province of Burgos in Spain. It was one of the most important Roman cities of the northern half of Hispania and, from the 1st century BC, served as the capital of a conventus iuridici in the province Hispania Tarraconensis, called Conventus Cluniensis. It was located on the road that led from Caesaraugusta (Zaragoza) to Asturica Augusta (Astorga). The city declined during the 3rd century and was largely abandoned by the Visigothic era. Clunia is a toponym of Arevacian origin.

== History ==
=== Origins ===
The city of Clunia was founded on a mount a short distance from a Celtiberian settlement called Cluniaco, or Kolounioukou, belonging to the Arevaci, a Pre-Roman tribe that belonged to the family of Celtiberians.

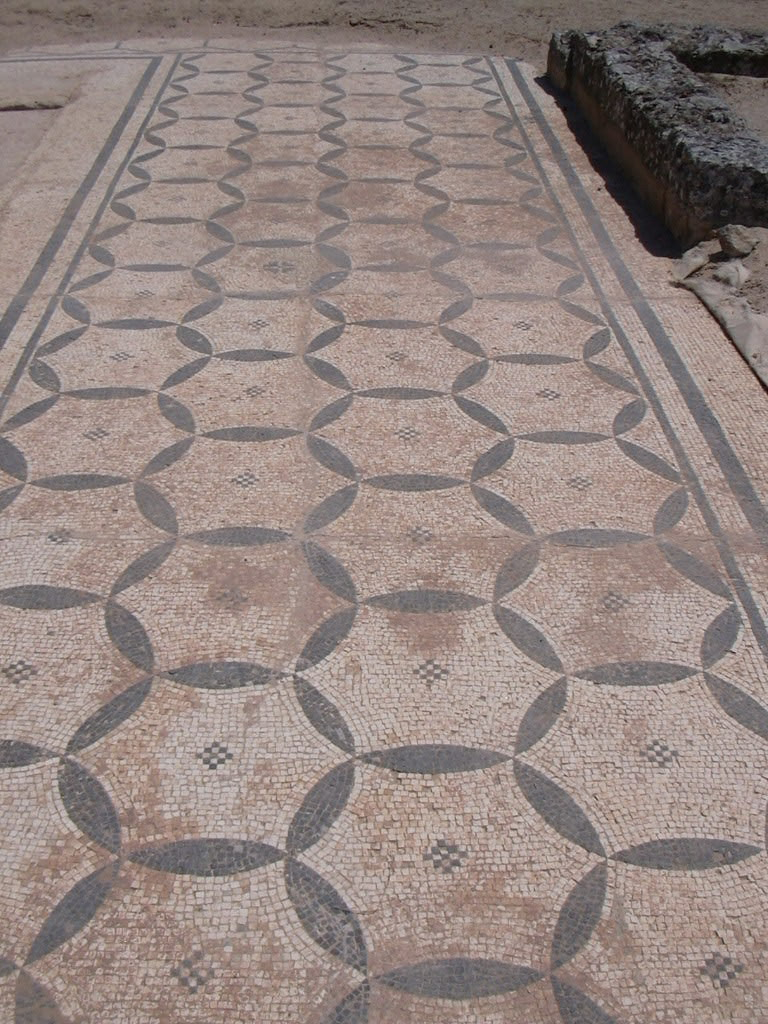
Mosaic at Clunia.

Clunia was built from scratch. Unlike other sites conquered by the Romans, Clunia did not occupy the site of an earlier city or town. Clunia boasted two public baths, a basilica, a forum, many taverns and shops, a theater, and a large temple dedicated to Jupiter.

=== Apogee ===
From Livy, we know that the site was besieged by Pompey in his fight against Sertorius in 75 BC; Pompey was forced to leave Clunia partly due to weather conditions there. After resistance by Sertorius, Pompey finally destroyed what existed of Clunia in 72 BC. Clunia fell under the control of the Vacceos in 56 BC, but subsequently fell again under Roman control, as did the rebelling Vacceos and Arevaci.

Years later, the city was formally founded ex novo during the time of Emperor Tiberius, as part of the Roman plan to pacify the region after the Cantabrian Wars. It was first granted the status of municipium, and minted small coinage, asses and dupondi, on which appear the local quattuorviri, who were in charge of their minting.

The city acquired, possibly during the reign of Galba or Hadrian, the status of colonia and the epithet of Sulpicia after Sulpicius Galba, governor of Hispania, proclaimed himself emperor, and who in 68 AD took refuge in Clunia during the anti-Neronian revolution. At this town he received news of the death of the emperor and the announcement of his own elevation as emperor by the Roman Senate (because of this some essayist added the epithet of Galba to the name of the city). He traveled to Rome from Clunia.

The splendor of the Roman city of Clunia was extended during the 1st and 2nd century AD, the same as other cities of the northern plateau of Hispania such as Asturica Augusta or Iuliobriga, located in the provinces of León and Cantabria, respectively. During its maximum apogee, it is calculated that the city of Clunia came to have around 30,000 inhabitants.

=== Decline ===
During the 3rd century, a gradual depopulation of the urban nucleus took place which was connected with the crisis of the 3rd century and the incipient decline of the Western Roman Empire.

It is evident that there were Barbarian invasions into Clunia. In fact, it is verified that, towards the end of the 3rd century, the city was burned by Barbarian tribes.

These invasions, as well as economic instability, may have contributed to the inexorable decline of Clunia. Nevertheless, it does not appear that there was a violent and general destruction; in any event, this preludes the end of the Roman cultural influence in the city of Clunia and its surroundings. Excavations reveal destroyed urban areas in Clunia, which were not rebuilt at the end of the 3rd century. Some limited reconstruction took place during the reigns of Diocletian and Constantine, but large parts of the city were uninhabited by the 7th century, during the Visigothic era.

The full conquest of Visigothic Hispania by the Muslims, the city and its surroundings were conquered by the troops of the Berber general Tariq ibn-Ziyad during the year 713. Later, Christians repopulated the city in 912, locating their city on the site that the current Coruña del Conde occupies, located where many Roman ruins from the city of Clunia can be seen.

Later, the village of Peñalba de Castro was built, which received the plateau of the enclave of Clunia in exchange for water in a time when the value of water was more valuable than the few ruins not yet buried that remained of the abandoned Roman city.

== Archaeological remains ==
Clunia constitutes an archaeological enclave of exceptional interest in a collection of the Iberian Peninsula. This interest is determined by its urban morphology and by the cultural sequence of the findings that it provides. Also, its ruins are the most representative of all the ones that have been found of the Roman period in the north of the Iberian Peninsula.

The archaeological excavations in the deposit began in 1915. The work resumed in 1931 and 1958, bringing to light the glorious past of one of the principal cities of Hispania whose extension — judging by the archaeological excavation — neared 1.2 square kilometres (0.46 mi^{2}), this being one of the largest cities of all of Roman Hispania. The excavations permitted the discovery —after centuries of being hidden— a theater excavated into rock, various domus with mosaics, streets, ruins of the buildings of the forum and a great cloaca, just as important sculptural findings, like an effigy of Isis and a torso of Dionysus, which are preserved at the National Archaeological Museum of Spain and in that of Burgos, including a large quantity of coins, epigraphic ruins, Roman ceramics such as Samian ware, glass and bronze objects.

== Urban morphology ==
As in every city, the majority of the space developed in Clunia was occupied by dwellings. The archaeological excavations have permitted the following of the evolution of the domestic town planning and verify some of its most characteristic features.

In the archaeological deposit, the following buildings can be observed:

=== Theater ===
The most significant ruin is the theater, one of the largest of its time in Hispania, it was excavated into rock, and had a capacity of 10,000 spectators. It had the purpose of serving for the interpretation of theatrical acts of the Classical period. Its recuperation has merited the award in the section of Restoration and Rehabilitation given by the biannual Awards of Architecture of Castile and León of 2004–2005. The panel of judges highlighted "the respectful recuperation of the theater and the general landscaping treatment."

=== Forum ===
The center of Romana cities, where the cardo maximus and decumanus maximus crossed, frequently receiving the forum of the city, a public square surrounded by porticos. In it political, commercial, judicial and, habitually, also religious, activities unfolded. In Clunia, the forum is not very far from the theater, in whose environs the ruins of three domus stand out, a basilica and a macellum (market). The mosaics grab the attention, the subterranean habitations and the systems of heating of some of these homes. On top of the market in the 17th century, a hermitage of limited artistic value was built, damaging the deposits.

=== Thermae ===
With the Roman forum are the ruins of the Roman thermae, of great dimensions and covered in mosaics somewhat simpler than that of the homes of the forum. Here also is very visible the system of heating of the different thermae rooms, the hypocaust.

=== Other buildings ===
In the subsoil of the city, where no visiting is allowed due to its fragility, are the systems of water supply and a priapic sanctuary.
