= Theatre of Clunia Sulpicia =

Ancient Roman theater in Burgos, Spain

Coordinates: 41.7839°N 3.3653°W

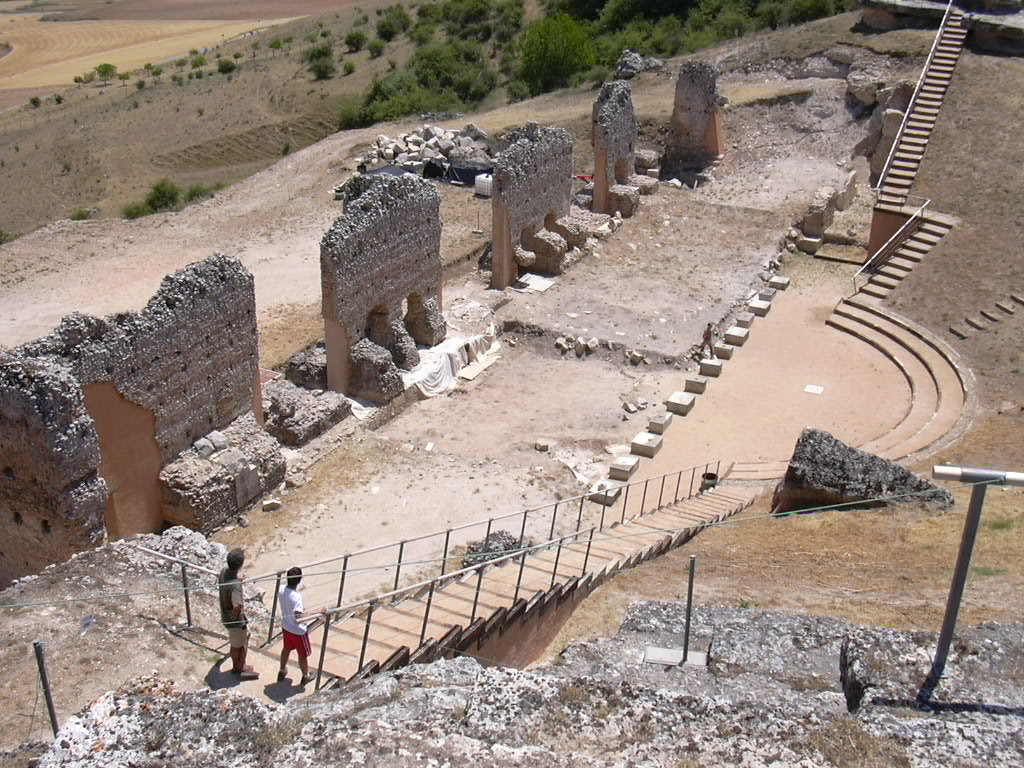
Partial view of the theatre

The Theatre of Clunia Sulpicia is a Roman theatre in the ancient city of Colonia Clunia Sulpicia, in what is now province of Burgos, northern Spain. Built on a hill called Alto de Castro (at a height of 1,000 metres (3,300 ft)), it is located between the modern-day villages of Coruña del Conde and Peñalba de Castro, in the south of the province of Burgos.

The edifice was built under the reign of Emperor Tiberius to monumentalize the most important city, along with Asturica Augusta, of the Douro basin. The city was in the province of Hispania Citerior Tarraconensis

The theatre is the most significant structure to survive at Clunia. Carved out of rock, it had a capacity of 10,000 spectators, which made it one of the biggest of its time in Hispania. It was intended to house performances of theatrical works of the classical period.

== History ==
It was built under the mandate of Emperor Tiberius as part of the monumentalization program of the 1st century AD, which provided the city with the necessary infrastructure for its new status as the capital of the legal convent. However, in the 2nd century, it underwent a renovation to adapt it for use as an amphitheater. This resulted in the removal of parts of the lower cavea, the orchestra, and the podium of the scene.

Next to the remains of the postscenium, thirty burials were found during the 2008-09 excavation campaign, which can be associated with the 5th century. Some of these showed evidence of violence.

== Features ==
The theater's cavea was constructed in the Greek manner by utilizing a semicircular eastern slope of the hill. An upper portico and a two-story scenic facade framed by Corinthian columns were added to it. The total diameter is 102 meters, and it had a seating capacity for around 10,000 spectators, making it one of the largest in Hispania.

Based on the remains discovered in various archaeological campaigns, its elevation and decorative program have been accurately reconstructed.

== Conservation ==
The theater is the best-preserved monument of Clunia, as part of the scenic facade has been partially maintained to the present day. Loperráez easily identified its typology and proceeded to draft an initial plan of it in the 18th century.

Its restoration was awarded in the Restoration and Rehabilitation section of the Biannual Architecture Awards of Castilla y León for 2004-2005. The jury highlighted "the respectful recovery of the theater and the general landscape treatment." Currently, various cultural events are held at the site.

== See also ==
- List of Roman theatres
- Clunia
- Hispania
