= Lucius Domitius Gallicanus Papinianus =

Lucius Domitius Gallicanus Papinianus was a Roman senator who lived during the 3rd century AD. He was suffect consul before the year 238. His murder of two soldiers of the Praetorian Guard, assisted by Macenus in March 238, triggered the revolt that brought down the Emperor Maximinus Thrax.

Details of his senatorial career have been recorded in an inscription found at Tarragona. He was governor of Dalmatia, Hispania Tarraconensis and Germania Inferior.
