= Ruina montium =

Roman mining technique

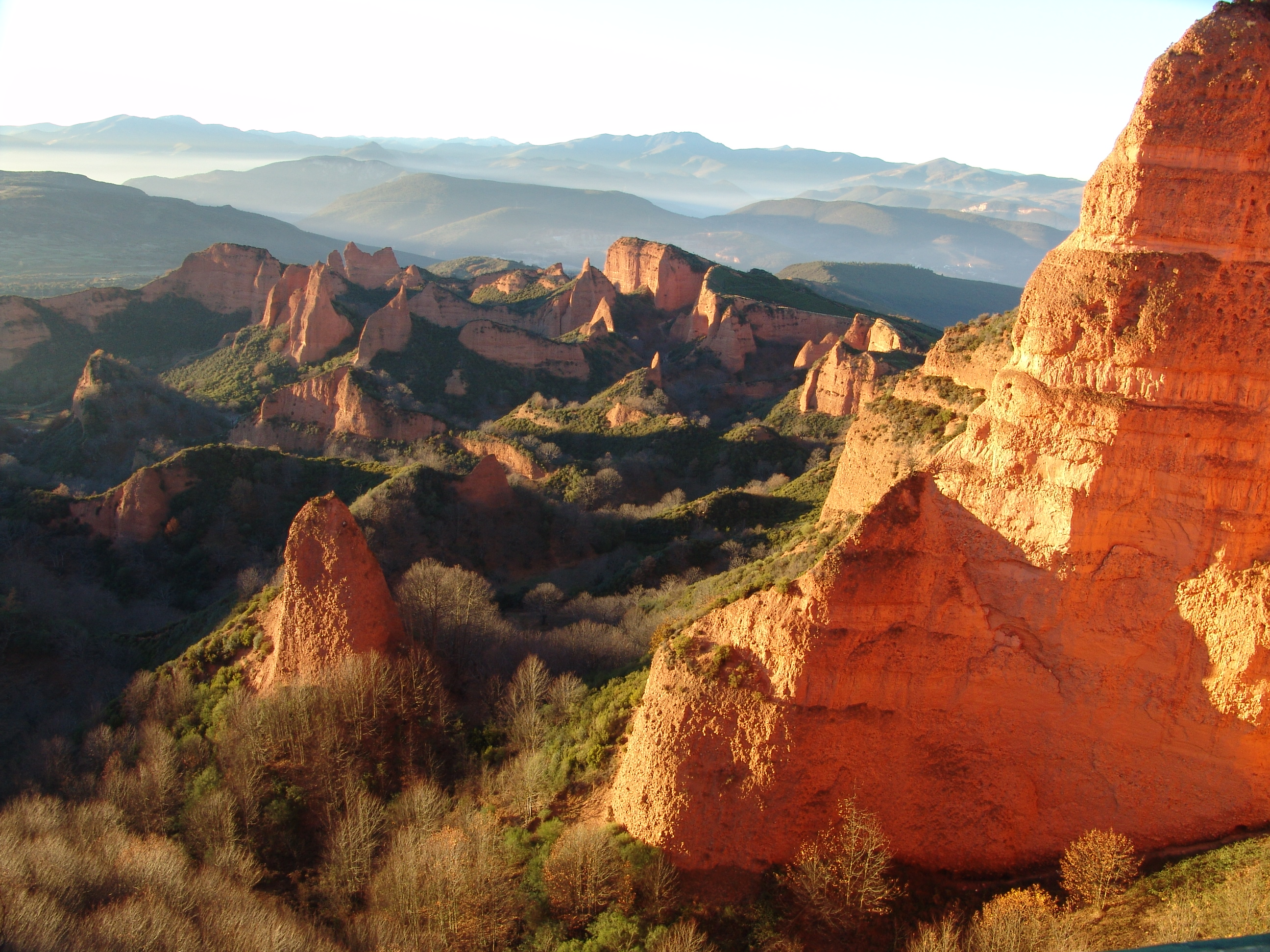
Las Médulas, a gold-mining site used in the Roman Empire (now Spain). The landscape resulted from the ruina montium mining technique.

Ruina montium (Latin for "wrecking of mountains") was a mining technique in Ancient Rome described by Pliny the Elder, who served as procurator in Spain. It is thought to draw on the principle of Pascal's barrel. Miners would excavate narrow cavities down into a mountain and fill them with water, causing pressures large enough to fragment thick rock walls.

In Natural History, Pliny writes:

Gold in our part of the world [...] is obtained in three ways: in the detritus of rivers, [...] Another method is by sinking shafts; or it is sought for in the fallen debris of mountains [aut in ruina montium quaeritur].

[...]

The third method will have outdone the achievements of the Giants. By means of galleries driven for long distances the mountains are mined by the light of lamps—the spells of work are also measured by lamps, and the miners do not see daylight for many months.

The name for this class of mines is arrugiae; also cracks give way suddenly and crush the men who have been at work, so that it actually seems less venturesome to try to get pearls and purple-fishes out of the depth of the sea: so much more dangerous have we made the earth!

== See also ==
- Hushing
- Hydraulic mining
- Las Médulas
- Mountaintop removal mining
