= Villalazán =

Coordinates: 41°30′N 5°35′W

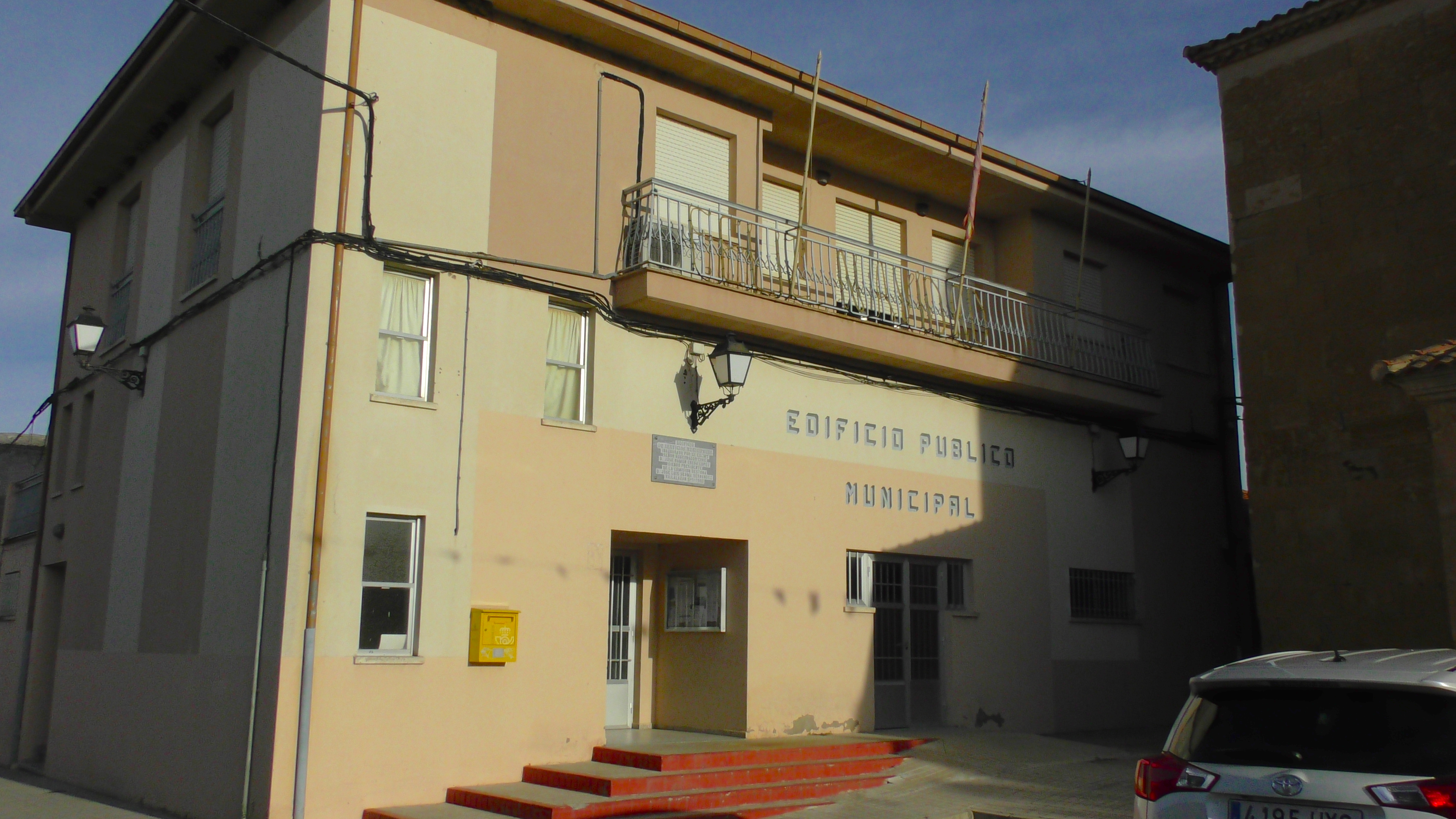

- Flag Coat of arms
- Interactive map of Villalazán
- Country: Spain
- Autonomous community: Castile and León
- Province: Zamora
- Municipality: Villalazán

Area
  - Total: 15 km^{2} (5.8 sq mi)

Population (2025-01-01)
  - Total: 241
  - Density: 16/km^{2} (42/sq mi)
- Time zone: UTC+1 (CET)
  - Summer (DST): UTC+2 (CEST)

Villalazán is a municipality located in the province of Zamora, Castile and León, Spain. According to the 2004 census (INE), the municipality has a population of 375 inhabitants.
