= Juliobriga =

Coordinates: 42.9866°N 4.1123°W

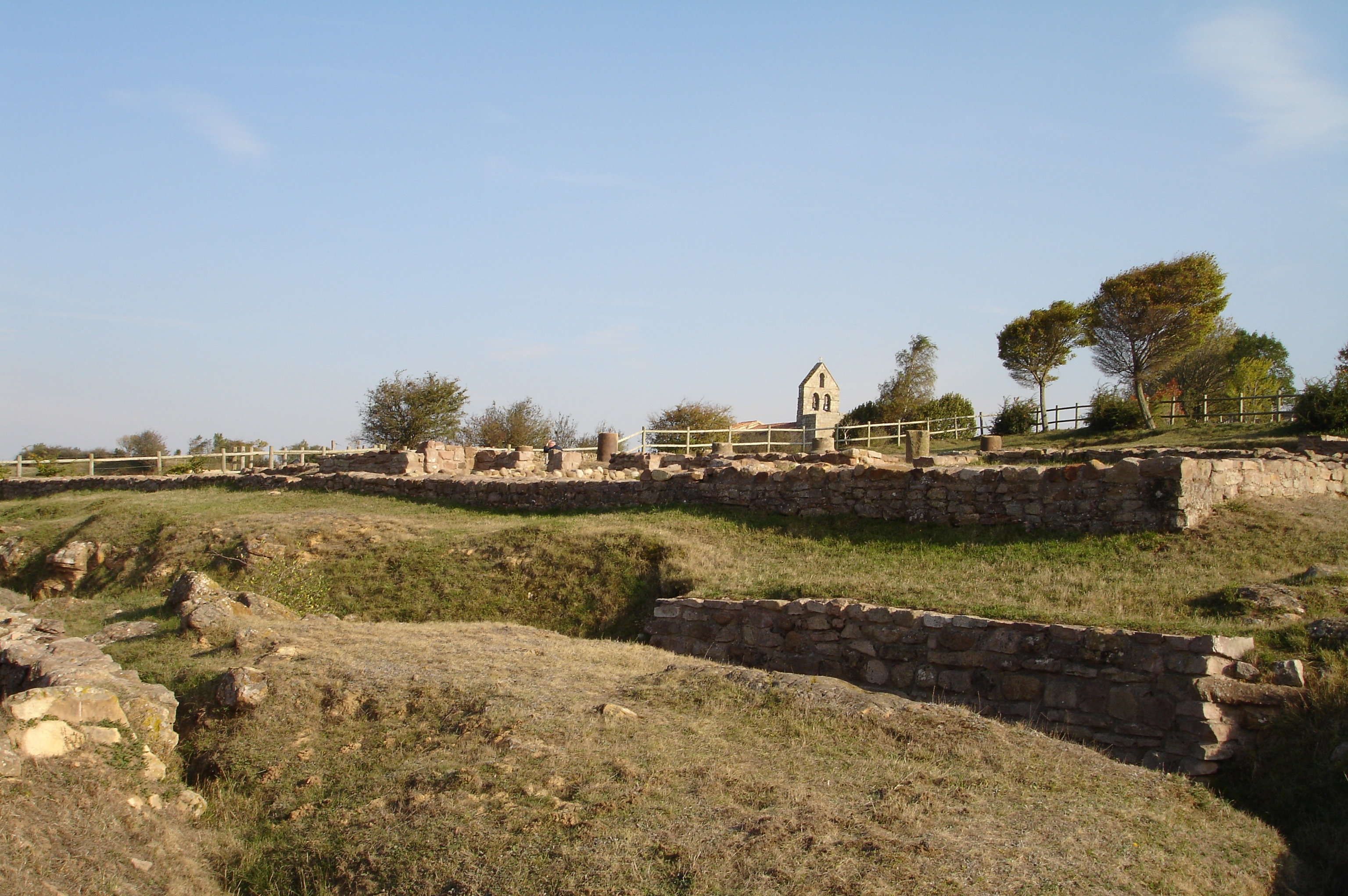
Partial view of the house of mosaics, Juliobriga

Juliobriga (Spanish: Julióbriga, Latin: Iuliobriga, Ancient Greek: Ἰουλιόβριγα) was the most important urban centre in Roman Cantabria, as stated by numerous Latin authors including Pliny the Elder. The site has traditionally been identified with ruins in the village of Retortillo (Cantabria) and its Villafría district, in the municipality of Campoo de Enmedio.

== History ==
Roman Cantabria during the Cantabrian Wars. The map shows the historical borders, modern borders, principal cities, rivers and tribes

The founding of Juliobriga, during the Cantabrian Wars (29–19 BC), made it a powerful symbol of Roman domination of the tribes of the Cantabri. The city was named after the reigning emperor Augustus and his adopted family name, the gens Julia, with the Celtic toponym element -briga, common in Iberia.

Due to its strategic location in the Besaya valley, Juliobriga was able to control trade between the Douro river and the Bay of Biscay. Juliobriga grew slowly, reaching its peak between the end of the 1st century and the early 2nd century AD. Following that, its population began to decline, until the city was completely abandoned in the 3rd century.

=== Rediscovery ===
The ruins of Retortillo were first identified with Julióbriga in the second half of the 18th century by Enrique Florez. Numerous historians and archaeologists have worked on the site since, including some of Spain's foremost. The ruins of Juliobriga were declared a Heritage Site (Spanish: Bien de Interés Cultural) by the Spanish Government on March 29, 1985.
