= Castromocho =

- municipality
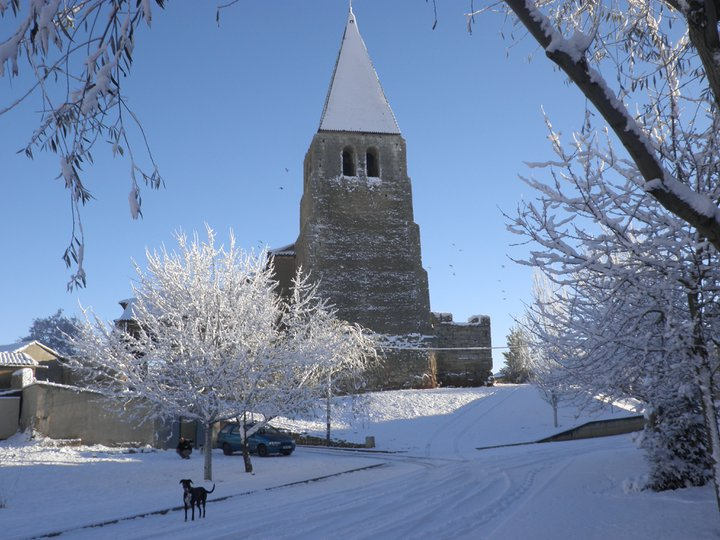

- Flag Coat of arms

- Location of Castromocho, Spain
- Coordinates: 42°2′0″N 4°49′0″W
- Country: Spain
- Autonomous community: Castile and León
- Province: Palencia
- Municipality: Castromocho

Government
  - Mayor: Florencio Pablo Caballero de la Torre (PP)

Area
  - Total: 52.0 km^{2} (20.1 sq mi)
- Elevation: 762 m (2,500 ft)

Population (2025-01-01)
  - Total: 193
  - Density: 3.71/km^{2} (9.61/sq mi)
- Time zone: UTC+1 (CET)
  - Summer (DST): UTC+2 (CEST)
- Post Code: 34305
- Area code: (+34)...
- Vehicle registration: P
- Website: Official website

Castromocho is a municipality located in the province of Palencia, Castile and León, Spain. According to the 2004 census (INE), the municipality had a population of 258 inhabitants.

The municipality borders Fuentes de Nava, Baquerín de Campos, Torremormojón, Villerías de Campos, Boada de Campos, Capillas, Villarramiel and Abarca de Campos.

== History ==
The area dates back to Roman times and there is evidence presented in coins and other remains found in the municipality. Castromocho has a ruined fort or castle. After the expulsion of the Arabs from the kingdoms of Castile and León, Castromocho blossomed after the tenth century but it formally founded as a town in the late fifteenth century.

The St. Stephen church was built in the sixteenth century, although recently renovated, with two renaissance facades, and the other church, Iglesia Santa Maria, dedicated to St. Mary, stands out for its beautiful terraced tower and steeple with glazed tiles which were also recently restored. The church contains a notable sculpture of Our Lady of the Angels, known as the "Queen of the Angels", a work attributed to the Baroque sculptor Lucia Ignacia Roldán.
