= Monte Bernorio =

Mountain in Palencia, Spain

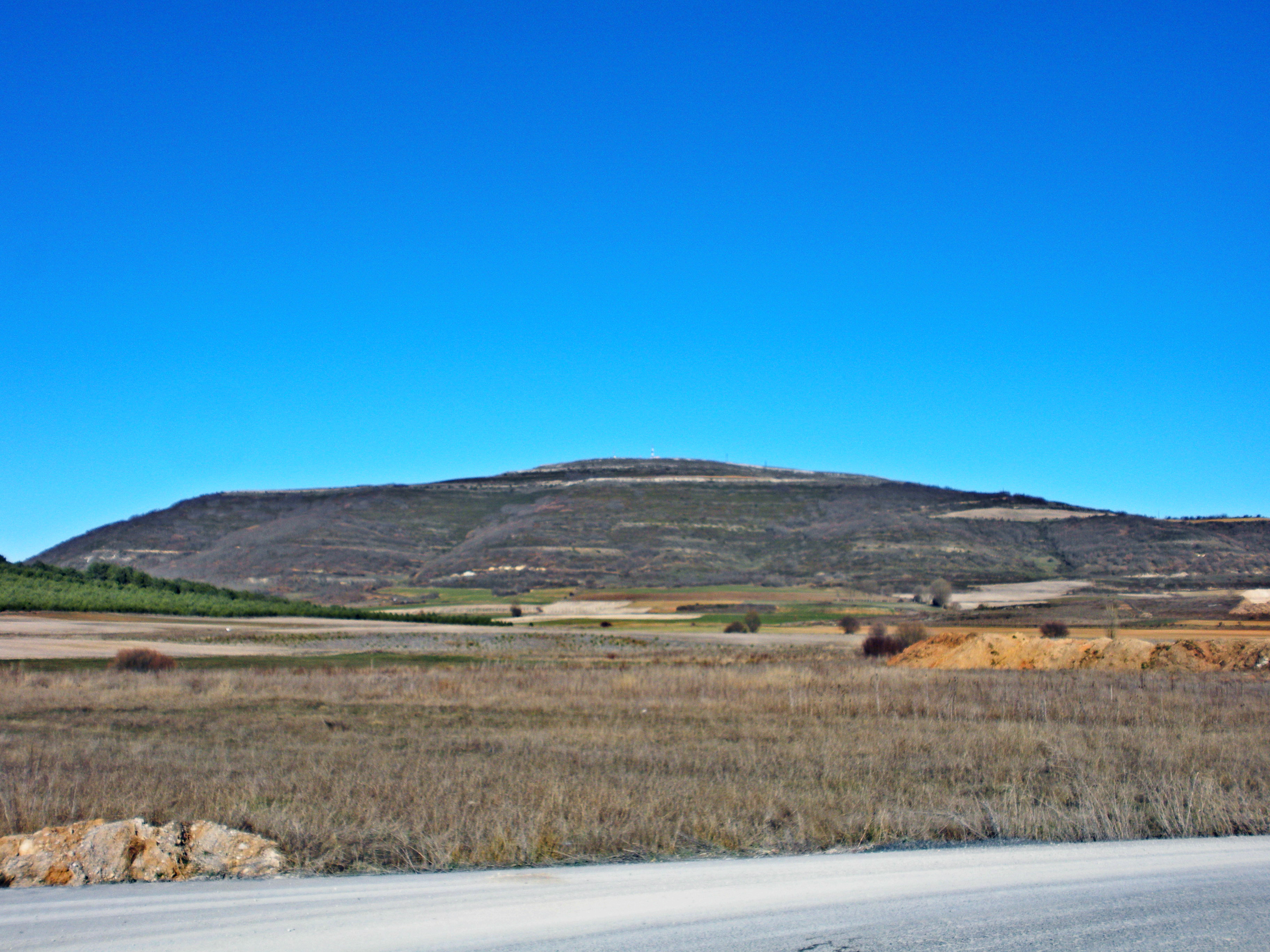

Highest point
- Elevation: 1,170 m (3,840 ft)

Naming
- Native name: Yacimiento del Monte Bernorio

Geography
- Location within Province of Palencia Location within Spain Location within Europe
- Europe: Spain
- Autonomous community: Castile and León
- Province: Province of Palencia
- Town: Villarén de Valdivia
- Range coordinates: 42°47′38″N 4°11′34″W

The Monte Bernorio is an elevation located next to the town of Villarén de Valdivia, in the north of the province of Palencia (Spain) where important archaeological remains have been found, as well as the remains of a fortified Cantabrian city, which exceeds 120 ha and is one of the largest found in Spain and also in Europe. This oppidum is one of the most important archaeological sites from the pre-Roman period in the Iberian Peninsula, also known as Castro de Monte Bernorio.

== Location ==
Monte Bernorio is a mountain of 1,170 m (3,840 ft). Its summit has a flat shape that extends over about 28 ha (69 acres). Overlooking a large plain, it is located next to the town of Villarén de Valdivia, which belongs to the municipality of Pomar de Valdivia, on the Montaña Palentina, 7 km from Aguilar de Campoo and close to the Cantabria-Meseta highway.

== Conservation ==
Despite treasuring the history of more than 1400 years at its peak, its emblematic character in the historiography of the Iron Age and having been declared an Asset of Cultural Interest in 1992, the Monte Bernorio site was threatened by the aggression that the project to install a wind farm with 24 wind turbines would entail if it were carried out. This is why it has been included in the Red List of Spain's Heritage in Danger, by the association Hispania Nostra. This project has been the object of significant popular rejection, considering it "a patrimonial aggression" of the highest level.

== Archaeological site ==
Located in a strategic place overlooking a large plain, currently occupied by some 40 towns, this impressive hill has been used as a fort and fortress.

The first archaeological excavations were carried out in 1890, commissioned by Claudio López Bru, the second Marquis of Comillas. Throughout the various archaeological campaigns carried out, a good number of constructions and utensils have been located that testify to the events that took place there, which range from the Bronze Age to the Middle Ages, The latest research works have been funded by public entities, mainly the Diputación de Palencia, and entities such as the Universidad Complutense de Madrid, the University of Frankfurt and the University of Oxford.

According to these investigations, the mountain has been occupied uninterruptedly since the c. 8th century BCE to the c. 1st century BCE, although there are indications of occupation during the Chalcolithic period and the Bronze Age (3000–2000 BCE ). During the 2006 survey, ceramics, weaponry and ornaments from the Iron Age were found, as well as the skeletal remains of a baby.

The perimeter of the mountain was surrounded by a wall, some of the remains of which have been found, as well as an inner wall that protected the acropolis. In the 2007 campaign, the first stone and adobe walls of the houses appeared, as well as personal belongings, weapons and remains of fauna. The remains of another baby were also found.

The site is completed with the remains of a Roman camp of more than 18 ha (the largest found in the Iberian Peninsula) located 2 km away, on the top of Castillejo (Pomar de Valdivia), from which two legions predictably undertook the siege. Numerous remains of military equipment have been found inside: arrowheads, caligae tacks, tent pole studs, a pilum, bronze remains of legionary equipment and some coins.

The site was declared an Asset of Cultural Interest in 1992, with the category of Archaeological Zone. Despite the fact that in 2004, the Junta de Castilla y León ceased its financial contributions to subsidize the excavations, they have continued thanks to the aid of the Provincial Council of Palencia and the municipalities of the region. Thanks to this support, the Monte Bernorio Institute for the Study of the Antiquity of the Cantabrian Sea was created, which in 2009, planned the creation of an interpretation centre for this site.

The latest discoveries made at the Bernorio confirm this site as one of the most important in Europe.

== Cantabrian Castro ==
The Castro de Monte Bernorio has been identified by some authors as the Cantabrian city of Bergida, which was the first to be attacked by the Roman legions during the Cantabrian Wars, whose inhabitants are supposed to have fled to Monte Vindio, although several other locations have been attributed to this mythical city.

Some parts of the fort are deteriorated due to erosion, agricultural work, and fighting during the Spanish Civil War in October 1936, when the mountain was also used as a fortress. Remains of dwellings and fragments of pottery have been found inside.

A ploughshare and other agricultural tools were also found, indicating the importance of this practice within the enclave.

== Battle of Mount Bernorio ==
In the c. 1st century BCE, the Roman Empire began its final assault on the territories dominated by Cantabrians and Astures, carried out by Emperor Caesar Augustus. In the vicinity of Pomar de Valdivia, the remains of a large Roman camp were found, one of the largest in Europe, studied by Eduardo Peralta Labrador, from which the attack and destruction of the fortress of Monte Bernorio was carried out, apparently by the powerful Legio IV Macedonica. Due to the size of this camp, Peralta maintains that it had to be occupied by at least two legions. The large number of Roman artillery shells found in the area show that the siege to which the fort was subjected took place on a large scale, as evidenced by the arrowheads, crossbow projectile points and stone balls of different calibers found. Evidence has also been found that the main core was destroyed by a fire, possibly set after it was taken.

== Acropolis ==
After the final subjugation of the Cantabrians, the Romans took advantage of the existing foundations to convert the area of the Acropolis into a castellum, which they occupied from the c. 1st century BCE to the c. 1st century AD, taking advantage of its strategic location to exert control over all adjacent territory.
