= Fontaneda =

Fontaneda may refer to:

- Fontaneda, Andorra, a village
- Galletas Fontaneda, a Spanish food company
- Hernando de Escalante Fontaneda (c. 1536–after 1575), Spanish shipwreck survivor in Florida
