= List of Bienes de Interés Cultural in the Province of Palencia =

This is a list of Bien de Interés Cultural landmarks in the Province of Palencia, Spain.

- Castle of Torremormojón
- Hermitage of Santa Eulalia
- San Martín de Tours de Frómista
- San Salvador de Nogal de las Huertas
