= Cohors I Cantabrorum =

The Cohors I Cantabrorum ("1. Cohort of Cantabri") was a Roman auxiliary infantry unit. It is attested by military diplomas, inscriptions and brick stamps.

== Name ==
- Cohors: The cohort was an infantry unit of the auxilia in the Imperial Roman army.
- I: The Roman numeral stands for the first (Latin prima). Therefore the name of the unit is pronounced Cohors prima Cantabrorum.
- Cantabrorum: of Cantabri. The soldiers of the cohort were recruited from the Cantabri people, when the unit was formed. The Cantabri lived in the northern coastal region of Spain, in the area of the conventus Cluniensis (with the capital Clunia).
- equitata: part-mounted. According to Margaret M. Roxan and Eduardo Peralta Labrador the unit was possibly a cohors equitata. Since the military diplomas were issued for infantry- and cavalrymen (peditibus et equitibus), but only cohorts were included in the diplomas, some cohorts had to be part-mounted, possibly one of them the cohors I Cantabrorum. In case Crispus (see below) has been a decurio, the unit would have been a cohors equitata; however, the reading of the inscription is controversial.

Since there is no firm evidence, that the unit was a cohors milliaria (1000 strong) or a cohors equitata, it is assumed, that it was a cohors quingenaria peditata. The authorized strength was therefore 480 men, consisting of 6 centuriae with 80 infantrymen each. In case the unit has been a cohors quingenaria equitata, in addition to the 480 infantrymen a further 120 cavalrymen would be attached, consisting of 4 turmae with 30 cavalrymen each.

== History ==
The cohort was part of the Roman army in the Roman province Moesia. It is attested by military diplomas for AD 78.

Military diplomas
Military diploma in the Epigraphik-Datenbank Clauss-Slaby (EDCS)	Date in the EDCS	Garrisoned in	In the military diploma the cohort is listed as; Expansions and restorations are marked with () and [], see Leiden Conventions.
Chiron-2008-319	78	Moesia	I Cantabrorum
CIL XVI, 22	78	Moesia	I Cantabrorum // I Cantabrorum
RMD-04, 00208	78	Moesia	I [Cantabrorum]
ZPE-173, 237	78	Moesia	I Cantabrorum ... cohort(is) I Cantabrorum cui prae(e)st C(aius) Cammicus C(ai) f(ilius) Fab(ia) Sabinus pediti Octavio Daphni f(ilio) Lingon(i); I Cantabrorum // cohort(is) I Cantabrorum cui prae(e)st C(aius) Cammicus G(ai) f(ilius) Fab(ia) Sabinus pediti Octavio Daphni f(ilio) Lingon(i)

The origins of the cohort are unknown; the date of its formation and the provinces, in which it was displaced originally, can only be surmised. The Roman historian Florus described in his Epitome of Roman History (Book II, chapter 33), that the Cantabri were dealt with harshly during the Cantabrian Wars (29–19 BC) of Augustus; e. g. hostages were taken. According to Roxan the formation of the unit by Augustus is thinkable, if the term hostages covers men conscripted, which were afterwards sent to other regions of the Roman empire. Otherwise, one should consider, that the unit was raised under Caligula (37–41) or Claudius (41–54). José Manuel Roldán Hervás assumed, that the unit was raised at the end of the Cantabrian Wars by Publius Carisius, whereas Peralta Labrador assumed, that it was formed presumably by Tiberius (14–37) around 22/25.

With the evidence available it is not possible to decide, if the cohort was transferred directly from Spain to Moesia or to other provinces in the meantime. The unit is attested in Moesia by military diplomas only for AD 78. Since there is no evidence for its later existence, it was probably annihilated in the Dacian Wars; Peralta Labrador and Florian Matei-Popescu assume, that it perished during Domitian's Dacian War between 84 and 86.

== Stations ==
Garrisons of the cohort are not known.

Several bricks and an inscription were discovered in two places in the area of the former province Moesia:

- Acumincum: bricks with the stamp COH I CANT were found here. According to Peralta Labrador the brick stamps were later read as COH I C AN and were assigned to Cohors I Campanorum.
- Prahovo: the inscription of Crispus Aquilae filius was found here.

== Members ==
The following members of the cohort are known:

=== Commanders ===
- Gaius Cammicus Sabinus: he is attested by one of the diplomas of 78 (ZPE-173, 237).
- Marcus Clodius Ma[],, a praefectus (CIL V, 4326, InscrIt-10, 05, 00737)

=== Others ===
- Crispus Aqui(lae) f(ilius), possibly a decurio (ILJug-02, 00463)
- Octavius Daphni f(ilius), an infantryman: a diploma of 78 (ZPE-173, 237) was issued to him.

== See also ==
- List of Roman auxiliary regiments

== Bibliography ==
- Eduardo Peralta Labrador: Las cohortes cántabras del ejército romano: Cohors I Cantabrorum, Hispania Antiqva. Revista de Historia Antigua XLI (2017) (Online)
- Margaret M. Roxan: The Auxilia of the Roman Army raised in the Iberian Peninsula. Dissertation, 1973 Volume 1 (PDF 1) Volume 2 (PDF 2)
- John Spaul: Cohors² The evidence for and a short history of the auxiliary infantry units of the Imperial Roman Army, British Archaeological Reports 2000, BAR International Series (Book 841), ISBN 978-1-84171-046-4
