= Castle of Torremormojón =

- Castillo de Torremormojón (Spanish)
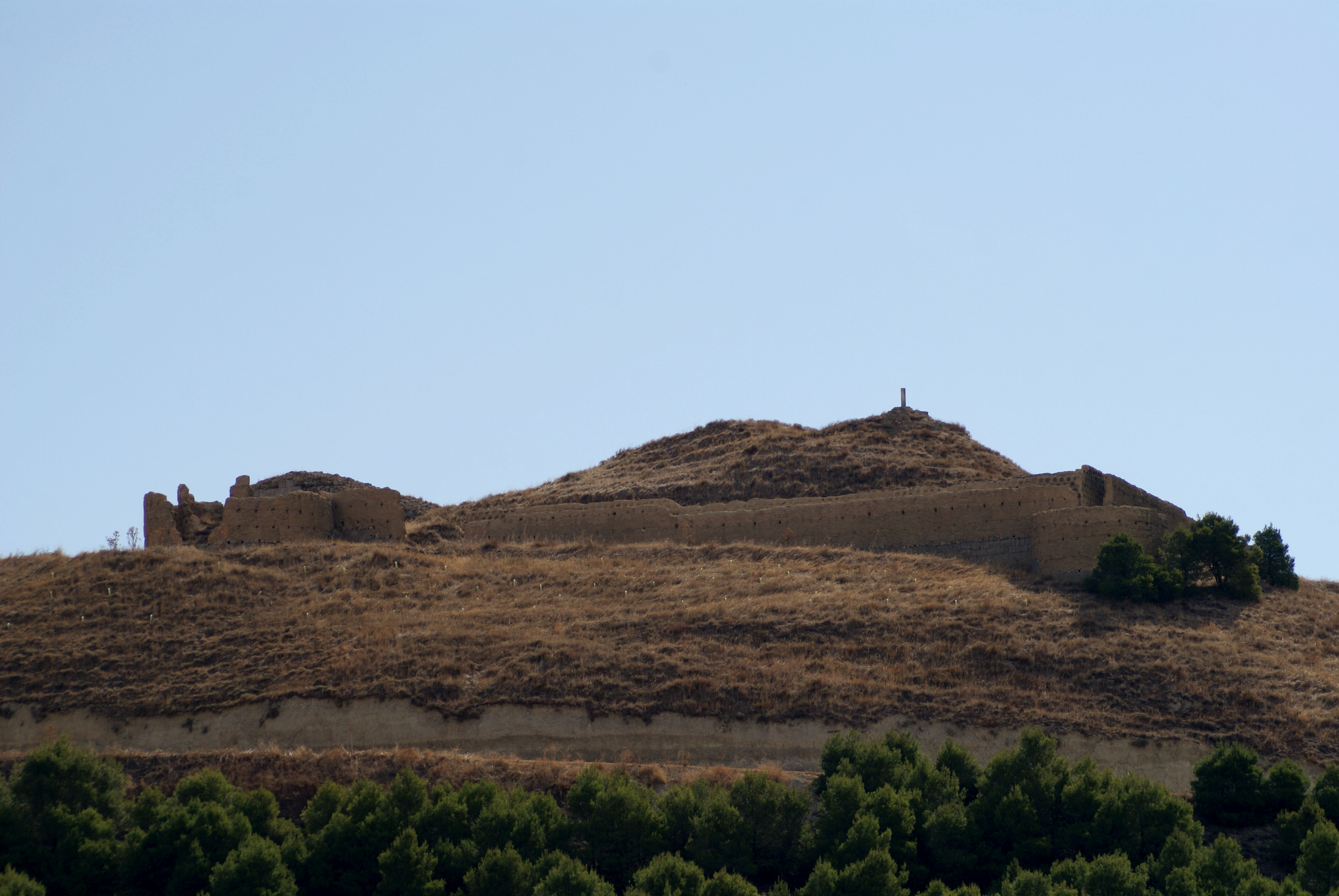

- Location within Spain
- 41.959067°N 4.772285°W
- Location: Torremormojón, Spain

Spanish Cultural Heritage
- Official name: Castillo de Torremormojón
- Type: Non-movable
- Criteria: Monument
- Designated: 1878
- Reference no.: RI-51-0000023

The Castle of Torremormojón (Spanish: Castillo de Torremormojón) is a castle located in Torremormojón, Spain.

== Conservation ==
It has enjoyed protection since 1878. It has been given the heritage listing Bien de Interés Cultural, although its condition has given cause for concern.

== See also ==
- List of Bien de Interés Cultural in the Province of Palencia
