= Torremormojón =

Coordinates: 41°58′N 4°46′W

- municipality
- Coat of arms

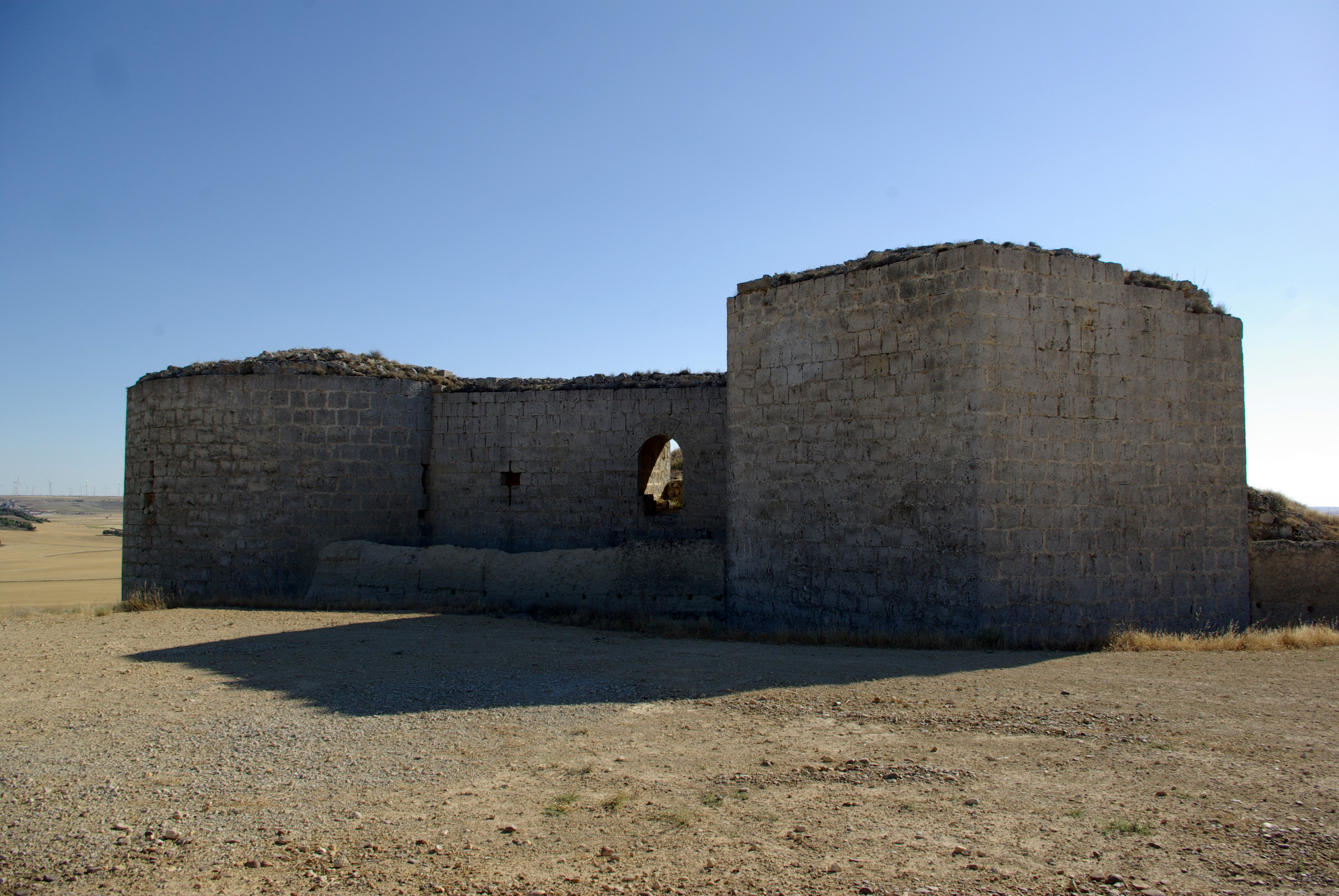
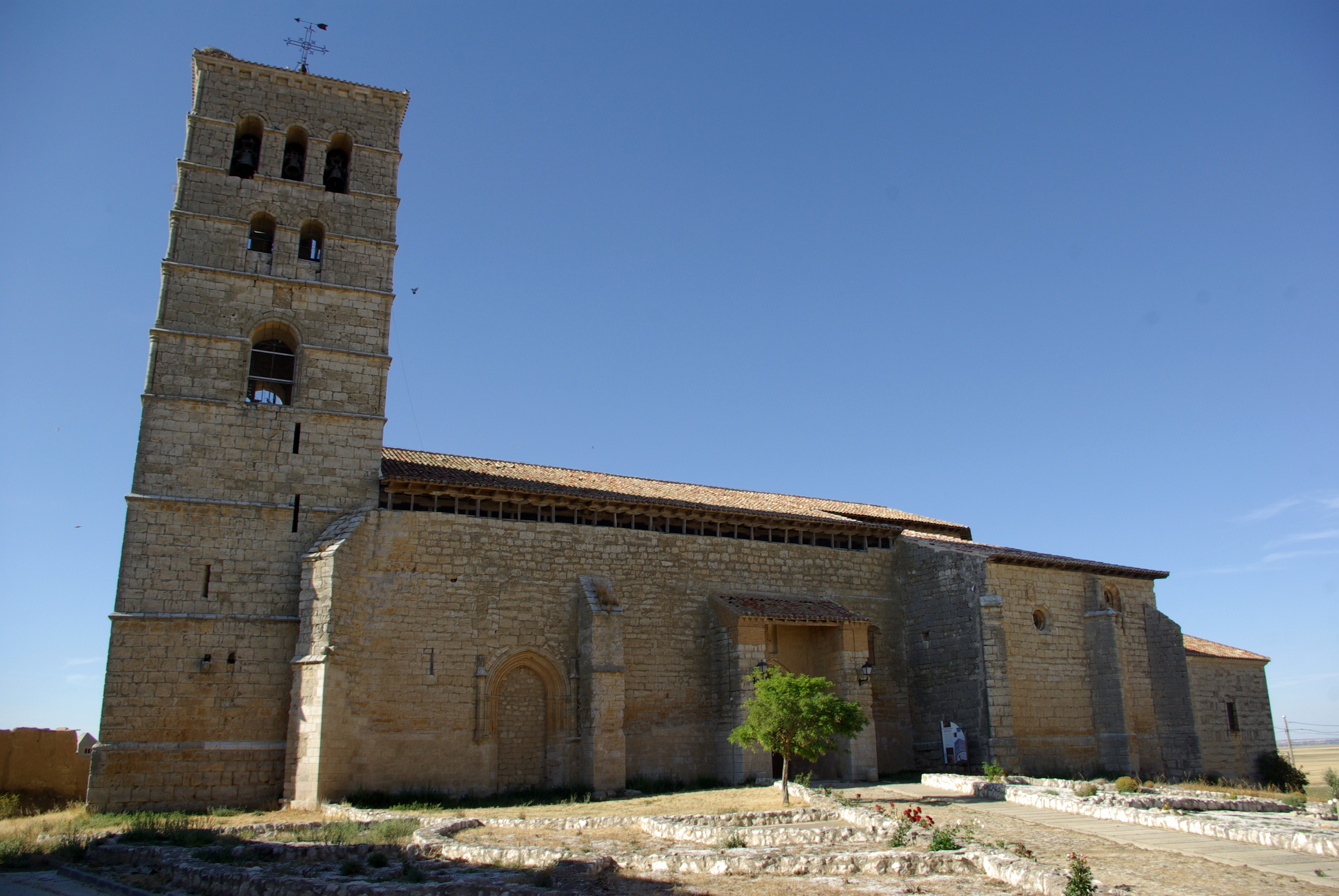
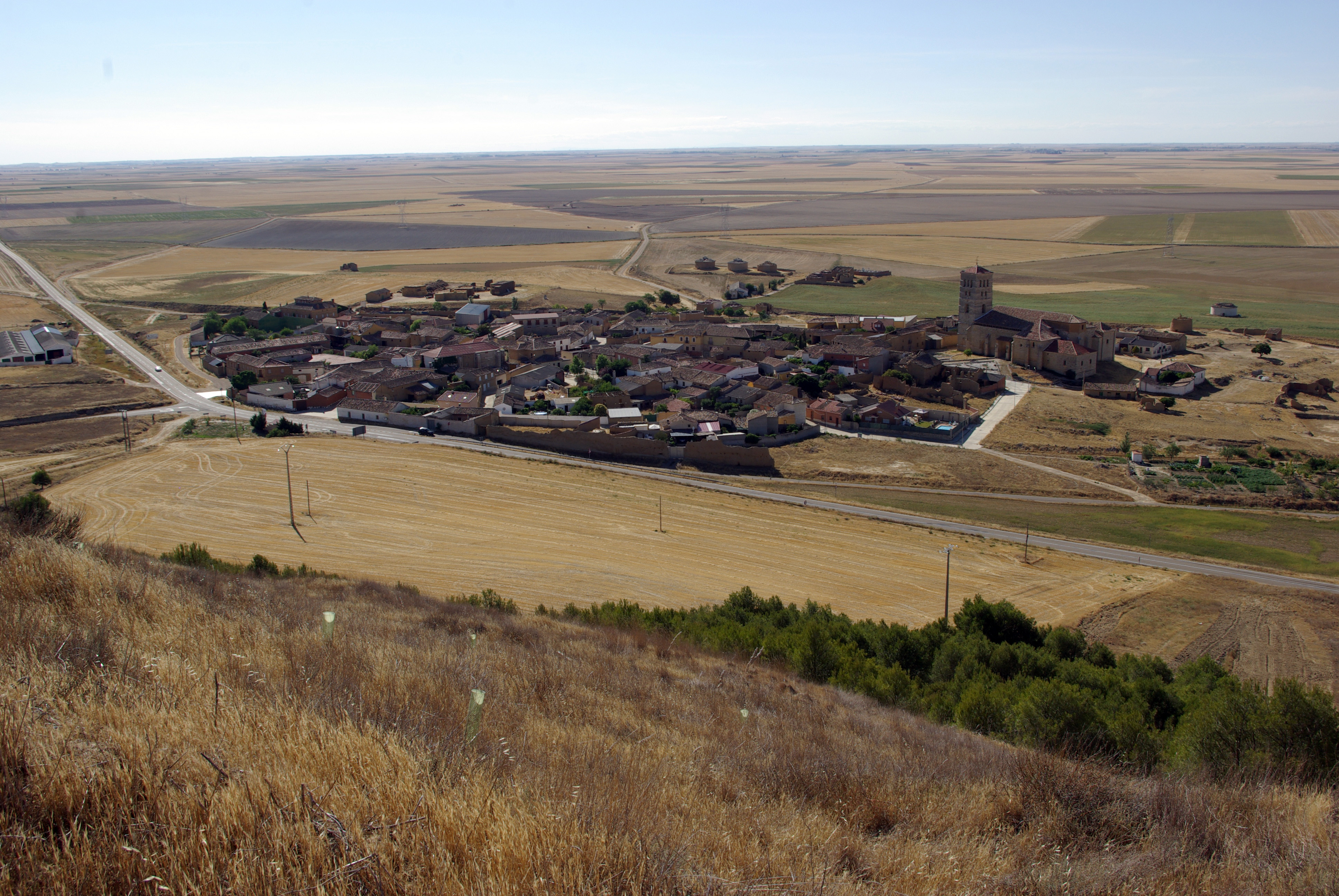
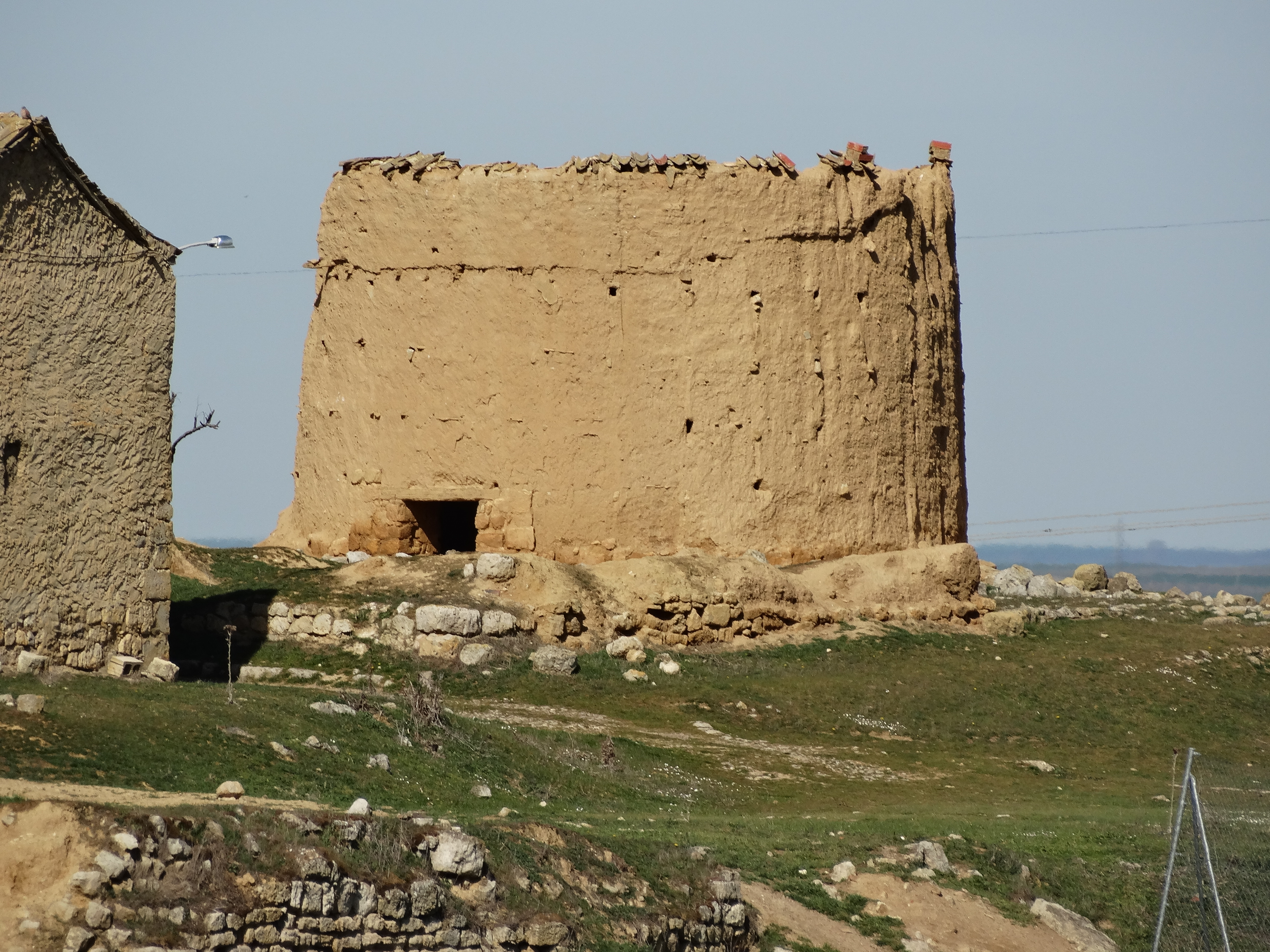
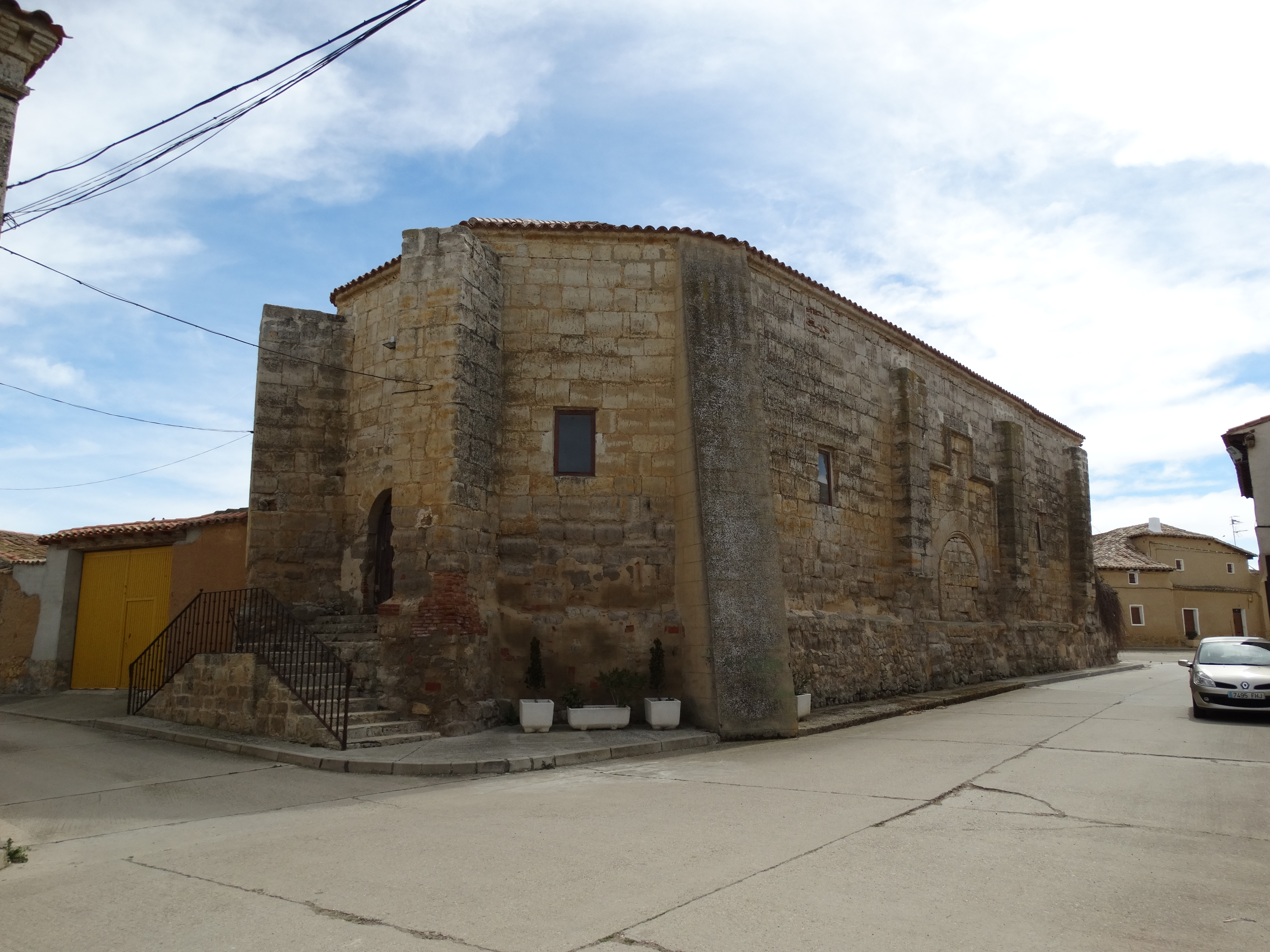
- Country: Spain
- Autonomous community: Castile and León
- Province: Palencia
- Municipality: Torremormojón

Area
  - Total: 28 km^{2} (11 sq mi)

Population (2025-01-01)
  - Total: 41
  - Density: 1.5/km^{2} (3.8/sq mi)
- Time zone: UTC+1 (CET)
  - Summer (DST): UTC+2 (CEST)
- Website: Official website

Torremormojón is a municipality located in the province of Palencia, Castile and León, Spain. According to the 2004 census (INE), the municipality has a population of 78 inhabitants.

== Geography ==
Torremormojón borders the following municipalities: Ampudia, Villerías de Campos, Castromocho, Baquerín de Campos and Pedraza de Campos.

There are roads that connect with Palencia, Medina De Rioseco, Zamora, Valladolid and León. The motorway will pass through here Palencia-Benavente. The typical fauna consists of hares, rabbits, foxes or foxes, wolves, weasels, eagles, storks, geese, snakes, snakes, sparrows, swallows, crows, magpies and flora is composed of pine, poplar, almond, moral, rustic herbs, rosemary, thyme, sloe etc.
