= Bulla Felix =

Early 3rd century Roman bandit leader

Bulla Felix was a legendary Italian bandit leader active around 205–207 AD, during the reign of the Roman emperor Septimius Severus. He gathered a band of over 600 men, among them runaway slaves and imperial freedmen, and eluded capture for more than two years despite pursuit by a force of Roman soldiers under the command of the emperor himself.

The story of Bulla Felix is told by the Greek historian and Roman senator Cassius Dio. Dio's story has several similarities to later legends of "good" bandits: Bulla "combined the attributes of Zorro and the Scarlet Pimpernel (he could never be caught) with a Robin Hood-like concern for social justice." Dio describes him as "never really seen when seen, never found when found, never caught when caught." The Latin name Bulla Felix means roughly "Lucky Charm", and he is likely to be a composite or historical fiction.

== Modus operandi ==
According to Dio, Bulla Felix operated an extensive intelligence network tracking travel and transport into the port at Brundisium and out of Rome. Bulla gathered information on the size of parties making trips from and into Rome and what they were carrying. His band of 600 brigands included runaway slaves who had been mistreated, and a significant number of imperial freedmen, former slaves of the emperor's household who would have been skilled or educated, and who had been cheated of their compensation. These imperial freedmen may have been ousted from privileged positions as a result of the civil wars following the death of Commodus, from which Septimius Severus had emerged to reign as emperor (193–211). Elsewhere, Dio indicates that a band of brigands with this kind of organizational capacity might also include men cashiered from the Praetorian Guard, the followers of usurpers, and those who had lost their property through confiscation during the civil wars. In Dio's view, the Severan reform of the Praetorian Guard that made it no longer a privilege of Italian youth left them at loose ends to become brigands and gladiators.

Though engaging in highway robbery, Bulla Felix did not resort to killing, and instead took only part of his targets' wealth before he released them. He then redistributed the wealth amongst the most in need. When the party included artisans (technitai), he detained them for a time in order to make use of their services. After benefiting from their skills, he gave them a generous gift and let them go.

== Disguises and deceptions ==
In Dio's anecdotes, Bulla Felix is a master of deception, though he was also known to bribe his way out of a situation. When two of his men have been condemned to the beasts in the arena, Bulla dresses as a provincial governor and visits the prison warden. He says he needs some men, presumably for the hard labor often performed by condemned men, and tailors his requirements in such a way that the warden chooses Bulla's own bandits to release to him.

In another incident, he approached a centurion in command of the Roman force sent to capture him, pretended to be someone else, and offered to reveal the location of the bandits' hideout. The centurion went with him, and walked into an ambush. Bulla convened a mock tribunal, dressed himself as a presiding magistrate, and ordered that the centurion's head be partially shaved in the manner of slaves. He then released him, on the condition that he deliver a message to his "masters": "Feed your slaves, that they might not turn to brigandage". The incident may be fictional, but contemporary concern for the feeding and clothing of slaves is expressed by the jurist Ulpian, who served as assessor to the praetorian prefect who eventually brought Bulla Felix to trial.

== Challenging authority ==
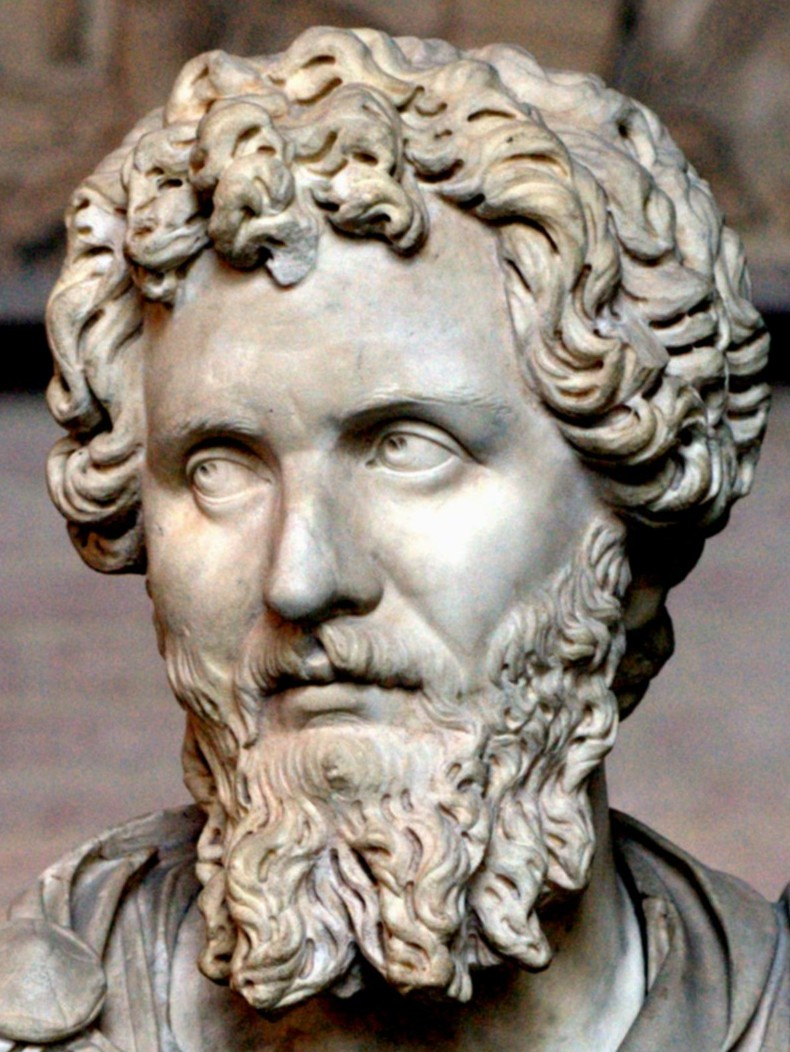
Bust of Septimius Severus, with modern restorations (Glyptothek, Munich)

Dio presents the activities of Bulla Felix as a personal affront to the emperor with a tactical ability as an orator. Septimius Severus expresses indignation that while he was winning wars in Britain, one outlaw in Italy had eluded him. Bulla is portrayed as opposing unjust authority and social inequality, and administering his own brand of justice. He was regarded as a natural leader, with a strong ability to orate and rally people, known for being able to instill a sense of heroism into his men to achieve their missions despite being overpowered.

His band was constituted as an alternative state to Rome, like that of the Lusitanian rebel Viriatus and other "bandit states" idealized in Roman literature: "tightly run, based on the unconditional loyalty of their subjects to their leaders and characterised by absolute discipline". Saint Augustine would later argue that a bandit state (latrocinium), as exemplified by the community organized under Spartacus in the Third Servile War, could not be distinguished structurally from a legitimate regnum ("rule, kingdom"), and a rule could be deemed just if its benefits were shared communally. Bulla Felix presides over a community of 600 men—the same as the number of seats in the Imperial Senate—and like an emperor, he is a patron of the arts, since the term technitai for the artisans he employed includes practitioners of the performing and fine arts as well as master craftsmen.

The possible meanings of the name Bulla Felix contribute to the fictional or symbolic qualities of the bandit leader. Felix was a cognomen adopted by Roman generals and heads of state from at least the time of the dictator Sulla, and had been used most recently by Severus's predecessor, Commodus. Felix advertised a leader as endowed with felicitas, good fortune that brings success not only for himself, but for those around him. "Bulla" recalls the bulbous amulet (bulla) worn by children and triumphing generals as a protective charm.

Dio, a Roman senator, may have intended the name to be a further allusion to an intimidating speech recently made by Severus to the senate. Just after he had defeated the usurper Clodius Albinus, who had supporters of senatorial rank, Severus announced that he was disinclined toward the clemency of Pompeius Magnus or Julius Caesar, and would instead favor a policy of severity, like Augustus, Gaius Marius, and Sulla. The similarity of Sulla Felix to Bulla Felix—whether the name was adopted by an actual man, or was Dio's choice for a fictional composite—helps cast the bandit as a satiric mirror image of the emperor. Bulla Felix is a model ruler and tactful advocate, uniting people to the cause and only taking a fair portion from the rich to distribute to the community, and distributing funds to creative members of society. He is cast as an avenger of those who suffered from the civil wars and heavy taxation. Dio encapsulates his perception of Severus by contrast with a deathbed anecdote in which the emperor is supposed to have told his sons to "enrich the soldiers, and scorn all other men".

== Capture ==
After two years, Bulla Felix was finally captured through a dishonorable betrayal rather than direct confrontation. A military tribune was given command of a substantial force of cavalry and ordered by the outraged emperor to bring Bulla Felix back alive or to face punishment in extremis himself. The tribune learned that Bulla was having an affair with a married woman, and had the wronged husband put pressure on his wife, promising immunity from prosecution in exchange for information. With the help of these informants, the tribune was able to catch Bulla while he was sleeping in a sea cave he used as a hideout.

Bulla was brought before the praetorian prefect Papinianus, who demanded to know why he was a bandit. "Well, why are you a prefect?" Bulla responded, implying that Papinianus himself was no more than a bandit. The encounter is a variation on a narrative theme found in other interrogations of a social renegade by an authority figure. Alexander the Great is supposed to have asked a captured pirate what drove him to harass the sea; the man replied, "The same thing that prompts you to harass the world. I do it with a little boat and am called a bandit; you do it with a big fleet, and are called emperor." A similar story was told of the runaway slave Clemens, who was impersonating Agrippa Postumus and leading a band of rebels when he was captured and brought before Tiberius: the emperor asked how he had made himself into Agrippa, and the impostor is reported to have said, "The same way you become Caesar".

A public announcement was made that Bulla Felix had been condemned to death in the arena by wild beasts (damnatio ad bestias). Without their charismatic leader, his robber band simply broke up.

== Banditry in the later Roman Empire ==
Roman Imperial historians use the Latin word latro (plural latrones) or Greek leistes (plural leistai) for more than 80 individuals, in a range of roles wider than English "bandit" or "robber" would indicate, including "rebel, rival, avenger". The Imperial bureaucracy kept records on crime, and while none of these local archives has survived except for one from Egypt, brigandage had occurred throughout Roman history, and became acute among the social disturbances that characterized the Crisis of the Third Century. The noble-sounding fiction that Bulla Felix preyed only on the rich, and not those of humble means, reflects the practical reality that there is no reason to rob from those who have little of value.

Bandits appear frequently in the fiction of late antiquity, such as Greek romance novels and the Metamorphoses of Apuleius. Latrones in literature are of two character types: common and despicable, or noble and just. The noble bandit, like Bulla Felix, typically can be captured only through treachery; ultimately, however, principled resistance is undone by corrupt authority. Dio writes about several glamorous or idealistic bandits, such as Corocotta, active in Roman Spain under Augustus, and a Claudius in Judaea a few years before Bulla Felix. In Roman Palestine, Jewish bandits became symbols of peasant resistance. The depiction of noble bandits by historians such as Dio was clearly influenced by fiction, and the story of Bulla Felix seems designed to sway elite attitudes toward the grievances of the lower classes, as well as to express Dio's social criticisms on the theme of just and moral authority.

== See also ==
- Eustace Folville
- Salvatore Giuliano
