= Francis Ferdinand de Capillas =

Spanish Dominican friar and missionary to Asia

Saint Francis Fernández de Capillas O.P.
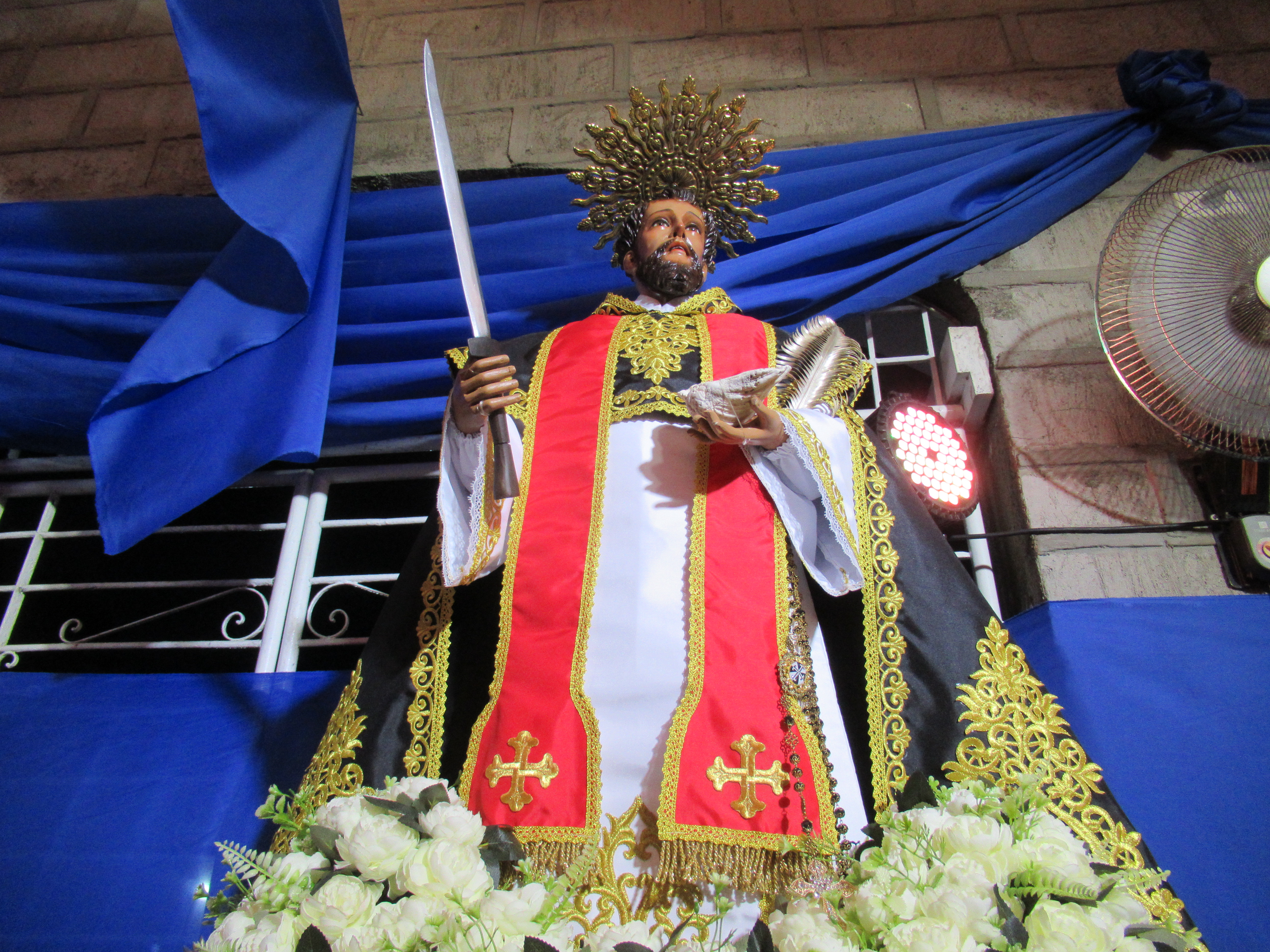

Missionary and Protomartyr of China
- Born: 15 August 1607; Baquerín de Campos, Palencia, Spain
- Died: January 15, 1648 (aged 40); Fu'an, Fujian, Qing China
- Cause of death: Decapitation
- Venerated in: Roman Catholicism
- Beatified: 2 May 1909 by Pope Pius X
- Canonized: 1 October 2000 by Pope John Paul II
- Major shrine: Dominican Priory of St. Paul, Valladolid, Spain
- Feast: 15 January

Francis Fernández (or Ferdinand) de Capillas (15 August 1607 – 15 January 1648) was a Spanish Dominican friar who went as a missionary to Asia. He died in China as a martyr. He was canonized by Pope John Paul II on 1 October 2000, as one of the 120 Martyrs of China.

De Capillas is honored by the Holy See as the protomartyr among the missionaries in China, and is considered the glory and pride of the Dominican Order.

== Biography ==
De Capillas was born in Baquerín de Campos, Palencia, Spain, on 14 August 1607. At the age of 17 he entered the Order of Preachers, receiving the religious habit in the Dominican Priory of St. Paul in Valladolid. While still a deacon he was sent by his Order to do missionary work in the Philippines, landing in Manila during February 1631. Shortly after his arrival he was ordained as a priest. De Capillas remained there for the next decade, working alongside his fellow friars. His own field of labor was the district of Tuao, Cagayan Valley, on the island of Luzon.

De Capillas considered that time spent in the Philippines as a period of preparation for a mission to China. At the Provincial Chapter held by the friars of the Order in Manila in 1641, he was given permission to transfer to the Order's mission there, soon transferring to that island, along with a friend, Francisco Díez. He was one of the last Spanish missionaries in Taiwan before they were ousted from the island by the Dutch later that same year.

The two friars arrived in Fujian, mainland China, in March 1642, where they joined a fellow Dominican who had survived an earlier period of persecution. They then engaged in evangelization among the Chinese people of the region, especially in the cities of Fogan (Fu'an) and Ting-Moyang Ten. They were so successful that they were able to establish a community of the Third Order of Saint Dominic. On 4 November 1644, there was a huge change of fortune for the mission. That day, his friend Francisco Diez died of natural causes. Later the same day, the Manchurians invaded the city of Fuan, where the missionaries were based, in their conquest of the Ming Dynasty. The new dynasty was hostile to Christianity and immediately began to persecute the Christians.

On 13 November 1647, De Capillas was captured while returning from Fogan, where he had gone to administer the sacraments to a sick person. Enduring many insults, he was taken to the local prison where he was repeatedly tortured. He was moved, almost dying, to a prison where they locked up those criminals condemned to death. His example and words led the jailors to show him leniency and allow food and drink to be brought to him, which he shared with other prisoners.

While in prison, he wrote:

I am here with other prisoners and we have developed a fellowship. They ask me about the Gospel of the Lord. I am not concerned about getting out of here because here I know I am doing the will of God. They do not let me stay up at night to pray, so I pray in bed before dawn. I live here in great joy without any worry, knowing that I am here because of Jesus Christ. The pearls I have found here these days are not always easy to find.

On 15 January 1648, De Capillas was sentenced to death on charges of disseminating false doctrines and inciting the people against the new Emperor. His death sentence, by decapitation, was carried out later that day. He thus became the first martyr within the Chinese empire.

== Veneration ==
De Capillas was beatified by Pope Pius X, 2 May 1909, along with 14 Chinese laypeople who had also died as martyrs. He was canonized as part of a group of 120 martyrs of China on 1 October 2000, by Pope John Paul II. Their collective memory is remembered on 9 July, while the feast day of Francis Fernández de Capillas is observed on 15 January. He is considered a protomartyr by the Holy See.

== See also ==
- List of saints
- "Francis Ferdinand de Capillas". Patron Saint Index. Archived from the original on 31 March 2006.
