= Avarigines =

Tribe in Cantabria, Spain

Ancient Cantabrians
- Roman Cantabria during the Cantabrian Wars. The map indicates the borders of the cantabrian territory in relation to the present Cantabria as well as the different tribes who inhabited it, the neighboring people, towns and geographic features.

Regions with significant populations
- Spain

Languages
- Cantabrian

Religion
- Cantabrian paganism

Related ethnic groups
- Blendii, Camarici or Tamarici, Concani, Coniaci or Conisci, Morecani, Noegi, Orgenomesci, Plentuisii, Salaeni, Vadinienses, Vellici or Velliques

The Avarigines or Avarigini were a Cantabrian tribe that lived on the eastern side of the river Namnasa, the modern Nansa, along its middle and upper parts, opposite the Organomesci.

All we know about them is that their name has a Celtic origin. They were mentioned by the Roman geographer Pomponius Mela. For a long time, due to their similar Celtic names, they were confused with Autrigones, a different and better-documented tribe.

== Bibliography ==
- Pomponius Mela, De Situ Orbis or Chorographia (On the Places of the World).
- José María Solana Sainz, "The Autrigones through Literary Sources", Colegio Universitario de Álava (1974).
- Venceslas Kruta, Les Celtes Histoire et Dictionnaire, Bouquins (2000).
- Eduardo Peralta Labrador, The Cantabrians before Rome, Ed. Royal Academy of History (2003), ISBN 978-84-89512597.
