= Galletas Fontaneda =

Spanish food company

Fontaneda
- Industry: Food processing
- Founded: 1881; 145 years ago
- Headquarters: Av. Generalísimo, 36; Aguilar de Campoo; 34800, Spain
- Products: Cookies; Biscuits; Crackers
- Revenue: ▼€30.149 million (1997)
- Net income: ▼€4.281 million (1997)
- Total assets: ▼€16.068 million (1997)
- Number of employees: ▼600 (1997)

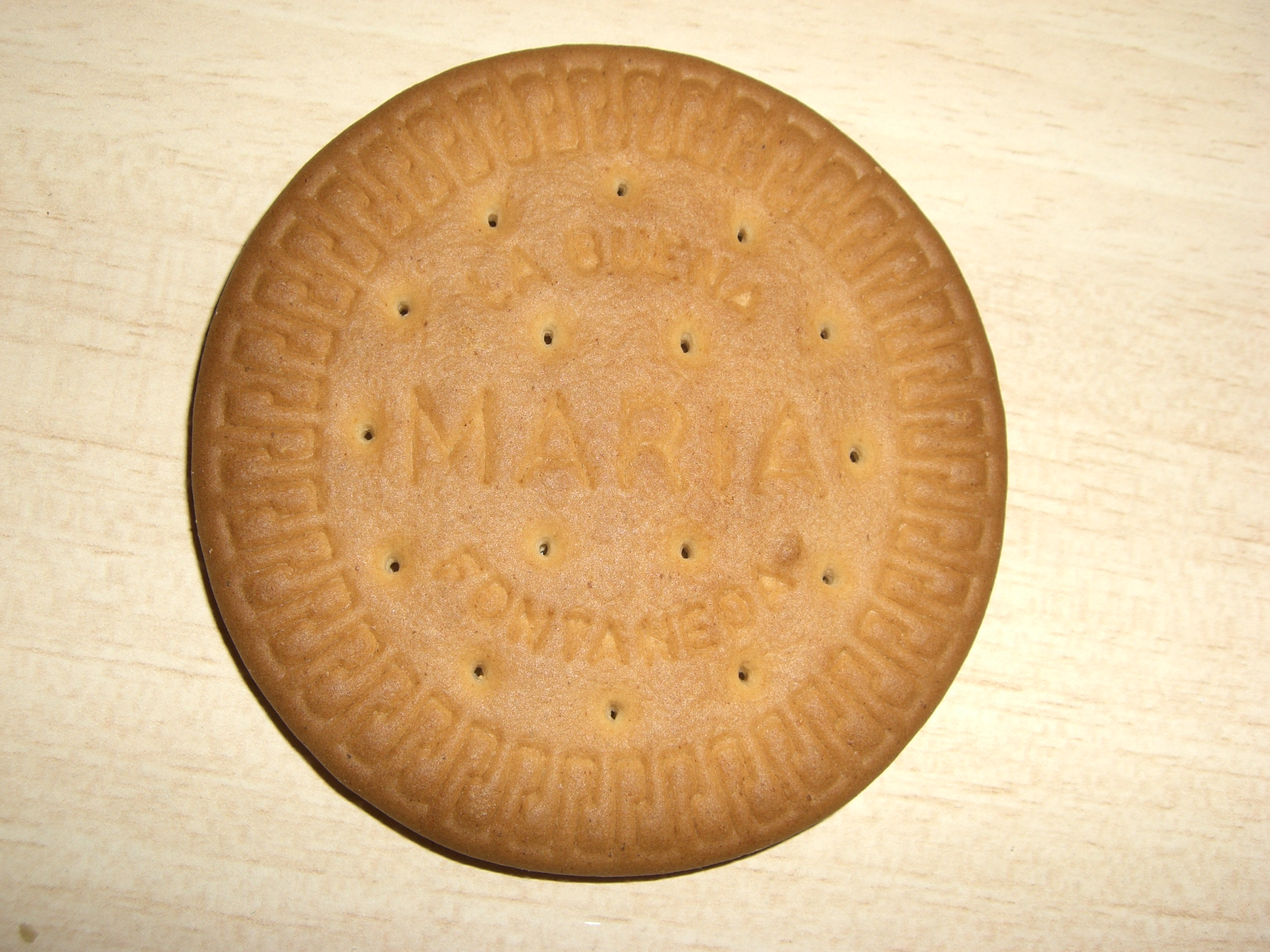
A galleta María of Fontaneda, the brand's classic

Fontaneda is a Spanish food sector company dedicated to the manufacture of crackers and biscuits (called "cookies" in North America). At its height, between 1950 and 1975, Fontaneda had yearly revenues of more than 10 billion pesetas.

It was founded in the town of Aguilar de Campoo, Spain, by Eugenio Fontaneda in 1881. In 1996, the multinational Nabisco bought it for over 4.5 billion pesetas and in 2002, under the direction of United Biscuits, it closed its facilities, maintaining the trademark to manufacture it in other factories in Spain.

The old Fontaneda factory in Aguilar de Campoo was acquired by Grupo Siro, which took over its staff and relaunched the activity in the town, which is considered "the biscuit town" of Spain. Since 2006, the Fontaneda brand has been marketed by the multinational Mondelēz International (former Kraft Foods).

For its part, the old factory in Aguilar de Campoo, where the production of the brand began, was demolished by Siro in April 2014 in order to take advantage of the land on which it was located as developable land.

== History ==
Eugenio Fontaneda y Millán, a confectioner of Burgos who learned the job in Reinosa, began his activity in Aguilar de Campoo in 1881, making biscuits, cookies and chocolates in an artisan way. Around 1920, he acquired a warehouse on the site of his historic factory, where he began to industrially produce the popular "galleta María", acquiring new technology in Switzerland and Germany. His son, Rafael Fontaneda e Ibáñez, would be responsible of this modernisation and the final take-off of the brand, assuming such responsibility upon the death of his father in 1921. He began chain production on March 25, 1923, under the name "Manufactura nacional de galletas, chocolates y bizcochos Hijo de E. Fontaneda". It hired renowned Catalan and Basque biscuit masters to expand its range of die-cut biscuits, and in 1927 Fontaneda already dominated the marie biscuit market in Spain. In 1933, it had tripled the production capacity of its factory. For a time, the name of the biscuit was attributed in Spain to that of Eugenio Fontaneda's granddaughter and Rafael's daughter, but the most likely origins lie with Maria Aleksandrovna of Russia, in honor of her wedding to the Duke of Edinburgh in London, in 1874.

María's sales in the Santander, Castilian and Basque markets grew exceptionally: in 1936, the factory had five ovens, although its progression was stalled by the outbreak of the Spanish Civil War. In the difficult 1940s, Fontaneda managed to overcome the fragile situation thanks to the entrepreneurship of Rafael Fontaneda, who managed to minimise the problems of raw material supplies. His company was greatly favored by the quota policy established by Francisco Franco, and also by legislation that favoured manufacturers who had their own sugar beet and sugar cane plantations, which Fontaneda produced in its extensive properties in Jérez de la Frontera. In the 1950s, Fontaneda had become already in the main biscuit company in the country.

In 1952, Rafael Fontaneda undertook the modernisation of his machinery, at an expense of some 10 million peseta. His good relationship with the Francoist regime allowed him a trip to the United States, subsidized by the National Commission of Industrial Productivity, to learn about the latest technical advances in the biscuit industry. Under the popularity of Fontaneda, other biscuit factories took off in Aguilar de Campoo, such as Galletas Gullón (founded in 1892) and Galletas Fontibre, founded in 1948. In 1958, part of the factory was destroyed by a fire, which forced its owner to make another important disbursement. The factory, located in the heart of the town of Aguilarense, was already a symbol of Fontaneda, and thanks to its expansion, it employed a large part of the population of Aguilar de Campoo.

The third family generation, with Eugenio Fontaneda y Pérez (grandson) at the helm, was involved in the development of the town, and in 1967, he was made president of the Center for Initiatives and Tourism in Aguilar de Campoo. His father, Rafael, died in 1976.

== Popular culture ==
The slogan “How good they are, Fontaneda biscuits” became over the years a benchmark in popular culture. It was used in press advertisements and television campaigns, immediately associating a melody to the brand, becoming the corporate sound identity of the product. It is considered a Jingle-Brand, a slogan created with commercial interest that became a popular success. Starting in 2009, Kraft Foods, owner of the brand since 2006, relaunched the image of the brand with presenter Julia Otero using the old slogan and melody, thus highlighting the value of the brand.

The María Fontaneda biscuit was also a common product in Spanish breakfasts, and is considered a biscuit with a great tradition.

== Chairmen ==
- 1881–1921 Eugenio Fontaneda Millán
- 1921–1976 Rafael Fontaneda Ibáñez
- 1976–1996 José Fontaneda y Pérez
