= Cantabri =

Pre-Roman people of ancient Iberia

The Iberian Peninsula in the 3rd century BC

The Cantabri (Ancient Greek: Καντάβροι, Kantabroi) or Ancient Cantabrians were a pre-Roman people and large tribal federation that lived in the northern coastal region of ancient Iberia in the second half of the first millennium BC. These peoples and their territories were incorporated into the Roman Province of Hispania Tarraconensis in 19 BC, following the Cantabrian Wars.

== Name ==
Cantabri is a Latinized form of a local name, presumably meaning "Highlanders" and deriving from the reconstructed root *cant- ("mountain") in Ancient Ligurian. During the High and Late Middle Ages, as well as Modern Period, the name refers usually to the Basques.

== Geography ==
Location of the Cantabri during the Cantabrian Wars, in relationship to today's Cantabria, along with the tribes that lived there, the neighboring peoples, towns and geographical features, according to classical sources.

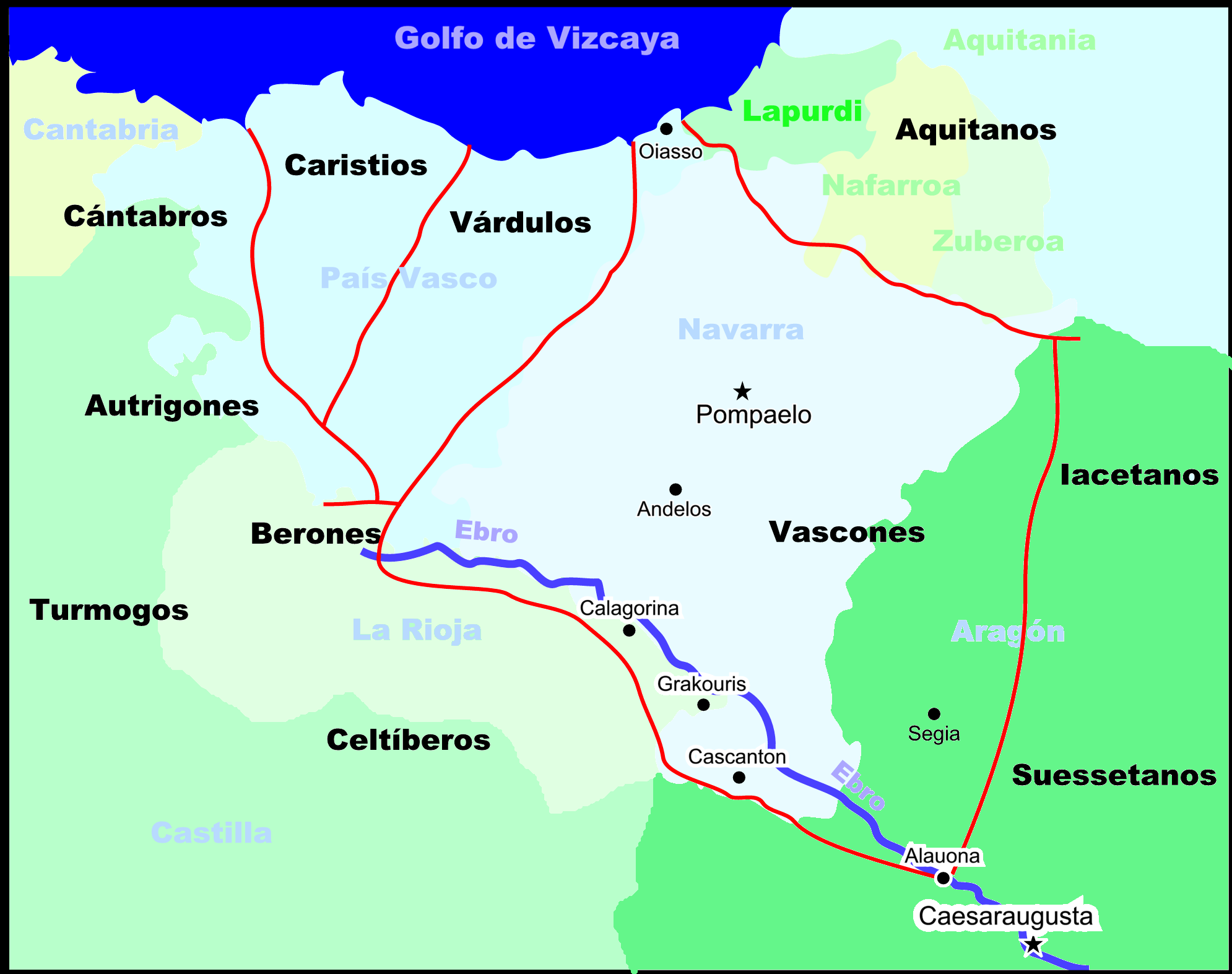
The Cantabri territory and their neighbors.

Cantabria, the land of the Cantabri, originally comprised much of the highlands of the northern Spanish Atlantic coast, including the whole of modern Cantabria province, eastern Asturias, nearby mountainous regions of Castile and León, the northern of province of Palencia and province of Burgos and northeast of province of León. Following the Roman conquest, this area was, however, much reduced, making up only Cantabria and eastern Asturias.

== History ==
=== Origins ===
The ancestors of the Cantabri were thought by the Romans to have migrated to the Iberian Peninsula around the 4th Century BC, and were said by them to be more mixed than most peninsular Celtic peoples. By the 1st century BC they comprised eleven or so tribes—Avarigines, Blendii, Camarici or Tamarici, Concani, Coniaci or Conisci, Morecani, Noegi, Orgenomesci, Plentuisii, Salaeni, Vadinienses, and Vellici or Velliques—gathered into a tribal confederacy with the town of Aracillum (Castro de Espina del Gallego, Sierra del Escudo – Cantabria), located at the strategic Besaya river valley, as their capital. Other important Cantabrian hillforts included Villeca/Vellica (Monte Cildá – Palencia), Bergida (Castro de Monte Bernorio – Palencia) and Amaya/Amaia (Peña Amaya – Burgos).

A detailed analysis of place-names in ancient Cantabria shows a strong Celtic element along with an almost equally strong "Para-Celtic" element (both Indo-European) and thus disproves the idea of a substantial pre-Indo-European or Basque presence in the region. This supports the earlier view that Untermann considered the most plausible, coinciding with archaeological evidence put forward by Ruiz-Gálvez in 1998, that the Celtic settlement of the Iberian Peninsula was made by people who arrived via the Atlantic Ocean in an area between Brittany and the mouth of the River Garonne, finally settling along the Galician and Cantabrian coast.

=== Early history ===
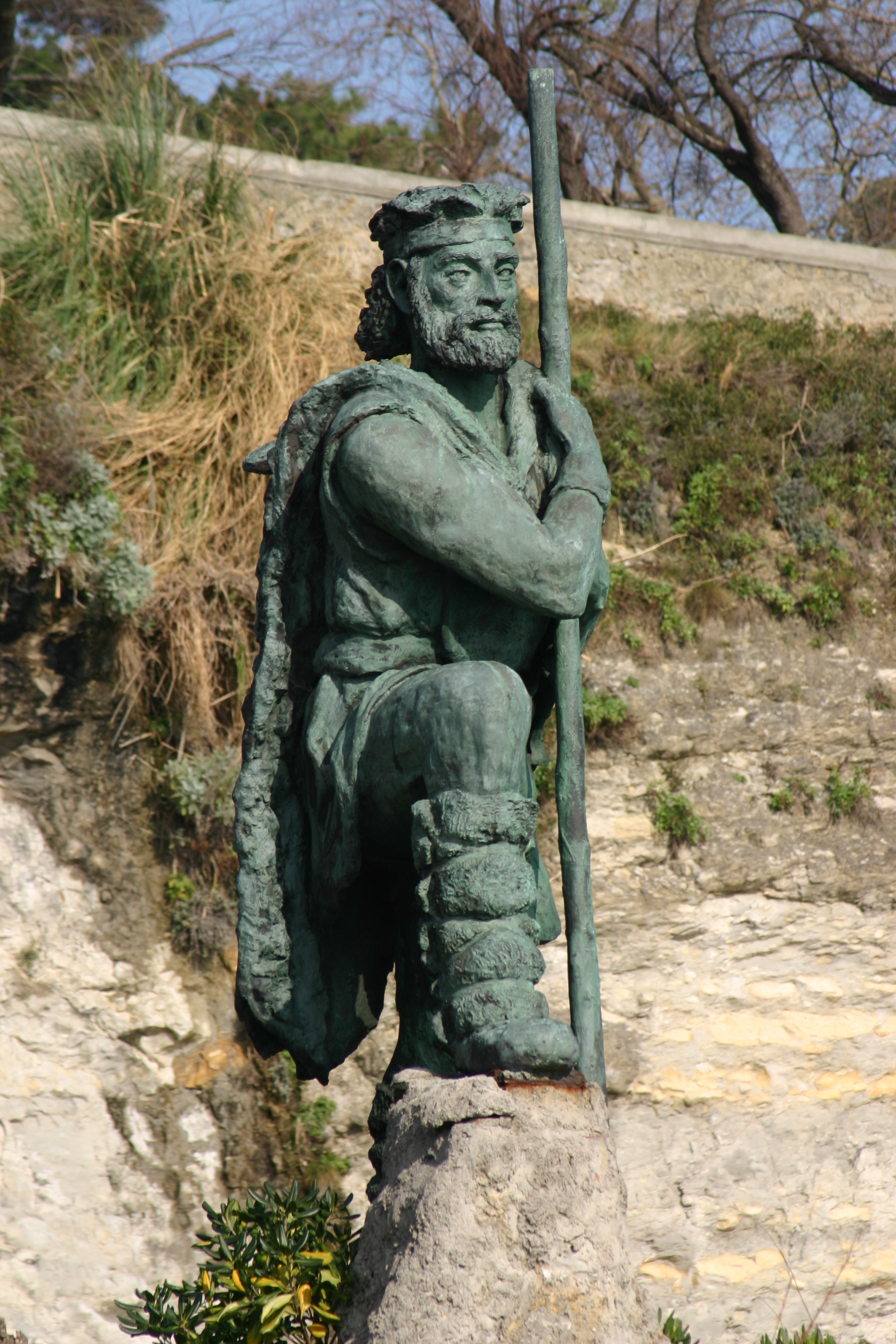
Monument to the Cantabri people in Santander.

Regarded as savage and untamable mountaineers, the Cantabri long defied the Roman legions and made a name for themselves for their independent spirit and freedom. Indeed, Cantabri warriors were regarded as being tough and fierce fighters, suitable for mercenary employment, but prone to banditry.

The earliest references to them are found in the texts of ancient historians such as Livy and Polybius, who mention Cantabrian mercenaries in Carthaginian service in the late 3rd century BC. During the 2nd Punic War, a Cantabrian mercenary contingent is mentioned in Hannibal's army, whilst another Cantabri mercenary band led by a chieftain named Larus was recruited by Mago and fought in Celtiberia against the propraetor Marcus Junius Silanus in 207 BC. That same year, other Cantabrian mercenaries fought alongside the Astures' at the Battle of the Metaurus, and later Cantabrian war-bands fought for the Vaccaei and Celtiberians in the Celtiberian Wars of the 2nd century BC. Another author, Cornelius Nepos, claims that the Cantabrian tribes first submitted to Rome upon Cato the Elder's campaigns in Celtiberia in 195 BC. In any case, such was their reputation that when a battered Roman army under consul Gaius Hostilius Mancinus was besieging Numantia in 137 BC, the rumor of the approach of a large combined Cantabri-Vaccaei relief force was enough to cause the rout of 20,000 panic-stricken Roman legionaries, forcing Mancinus to surrender under humiliating peace terms.

==== The Cantabrian Wars ====
In the early 1st century BC, the Cantabri began to play a double game by lending their services to individual Roman generals on occasion but, at same time, supported rebellions within Roman Spanish provinces and carried out raids in times of unrest. This opportunistic policy led the Cantabri to initially side with Quintus Sertorius during the Sertorian Wars, but at the final phase of the conflict they shifted their allegiance to Pompey, continuing to follow the Pompeian cause until the defeat of their generals' Lucius Afranius and Marcus Petreius at the battle of Ilerda (Lérida) in 49 BC. In between, the Cantabri had unsuccessfully intervened in the Gallic Wars by sending in 56 BC an allegedly 40,000-strong army to help the Aquitani tribes of south-western Gaul against the legate Publius Crassus, the son of Marcus Crassus serving under Julius Caesar, who succeeded in overpowering and destroying the combined Cantabri-Aquitani force of 50,000 men in their own camp and slaughtered 38,000 of them.

Under the leadership of the chieftain Corocotta, the Cantabri's own predatory raids on the Vaccaei, Turmodigi and Autrigones, whose rich territories they coveted according to Florus, coupled with their backing of a Vaccaei anti-Roman revolt in 29 BC, ultimately led to the outbreak of the First Cantabrian War (Bellum Cantabricum), which resulted in their conquest and partial annihilation by Emperor Augustus. The remaining Cantabrian population and their tribal lands were henceforth included alongside the Gallaeci and the Astures into the new Transduriana Province under the suffect consul Lucius Sestius Albanianus Quirinalis.

Nevertheless, the harsh measures devised by Augustus and implemented by his legate Marcus Vipsanius Agrippa to pacify the province in the aftermath of the campaign only contributed to further instability in Cantabria. Near-constant tribal uprisings (including a serious slave revolt in 20 BC that quickly spread to neighboring Asturias) and guerrilla warfare continued to plague the Cantabrian lands until the early 1st century AD, when the region was granted a form of local self-rule upon being included in the new Hispania Tarraconensis province.

=== Romanization ===
Although the Romans founded colonies and established military garrisons at Castra Legio Pisoraca (camp of Legio IIII Macedonica – Palencia), Octaviolca (near Valdeolea – Cantabria) and Iuliobriga (Retortillo – Reinosa), Cantabria never became fully romanized and its people preserved many aspects of Celtic language, religion and culture well into the Roman period. The Cantabri did not lose their warrior skills either, providing auxiliary troops (Auxilia) that served in two identified infantry cohorts (cohortes quingenariae peditatae – Cohors I Cantabrorum, Cohors II Cantabrorum) and in some cavalry units (Ala Hispanorum, Ala I Augusta, Ala Pannoniorum, Ala Batavorum or Baetasiorum, Cohors I Latobicorum) to the Roman Imperial army for decades, and these troops participated in Emperor Claudius' invasion of Britain in AD 43–60.

=== Early Middle Ages ===
The Cantabri re-emerged, as did their neighbors the Astures, amid the chaos of the Migration Period of the late 4th century. Thenceforward the Cantabri started to be Christianized and were violently crushed by the Visigoths in the 6th century. However, Cantabria and the Cantabri are heard of many decades later in the context of the Visigoth wars against the Vascones (late 7th century). They only became fully Latinized in their language and culture after the Muslim conquest of the Iberian Peninsula in the 8th century.

== Culture ==
According to Pliny the Elder Cantabria also contained gold, silver, tin, lead and iron mines, as well as magnetite and amber, but little is known about them; Strabo also mentions salt extraction in mines, such as the ones existent around Cabezón de la Sal, and describes a post-childbirth ritual in which the mother had to get up and the father go to bed, to be cared for by the mother. Strabo's description of the Cantabri implies matrilineality (some property being inherited through the mother's lineage), although there's little evidence of it after the Cantabrian Wars.

== Religion ==
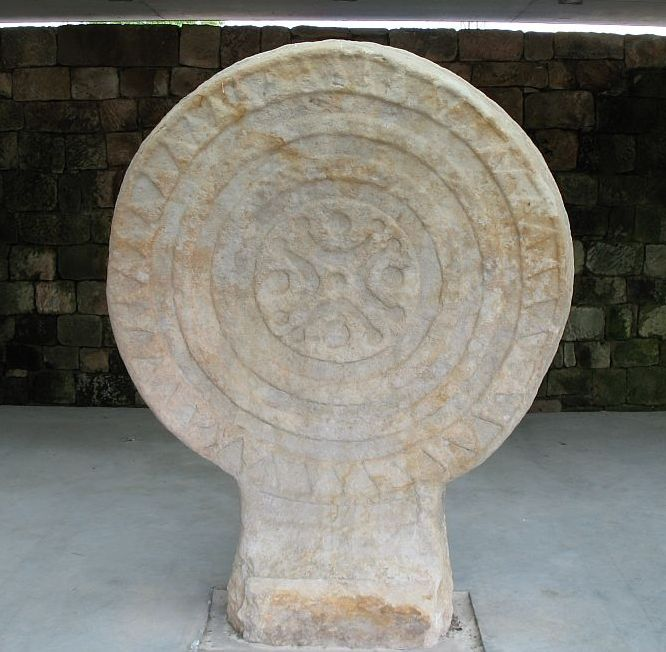
Cantabrian stele, carved in sandstone (1.70 m in diameter and 0.32 m thick)

Literary and epigraphic evidence confirms that, like their Gallaeci and Astures neighbors, the Cantabri were polytheistic, worshipping a vast and complex pantheon of male and female Indo-European deities in sacred oak or pine woods, mountains, water-courses and small rural sanctuaries.

Druidism does not appear to have been practiced by the Cantabri, though there is enough evidence for the existence of an organized priestly class who performed elaborated rites, which included ritual steam baths, festive dances, oracles, divination, human and animal sacrifices. In this respect, Strabo mentions that the peoples of the north-west sacrificed horses to an unnamed God of War, and both Horace and Silius Italicus added that the Concani had the custom of drinking the horse’s blood at the ceremony.

== Language ==
According to Leonard A. Curchin, the place-names from ancient Cantabria shows that a majority of names at the time comes from Celtic and other Indo-European languages. This shows that the people there, instead of the believed idea that they could have spoken a Pre-Indo European or Basque language, spoke the Celtic language that was widely used in Iberia at the time. He also shows that Romanisation was weak in the region.

== See also ==
- Astures
- Cantabria
- Cantabrian Wars
- Corocotta
- Gallaeci
- Sertorian Wars
- Duchy of Cantabria
