= Abarca de Campos =

Coordinates: 42°03′0″N 4°50′0″W

- municipality
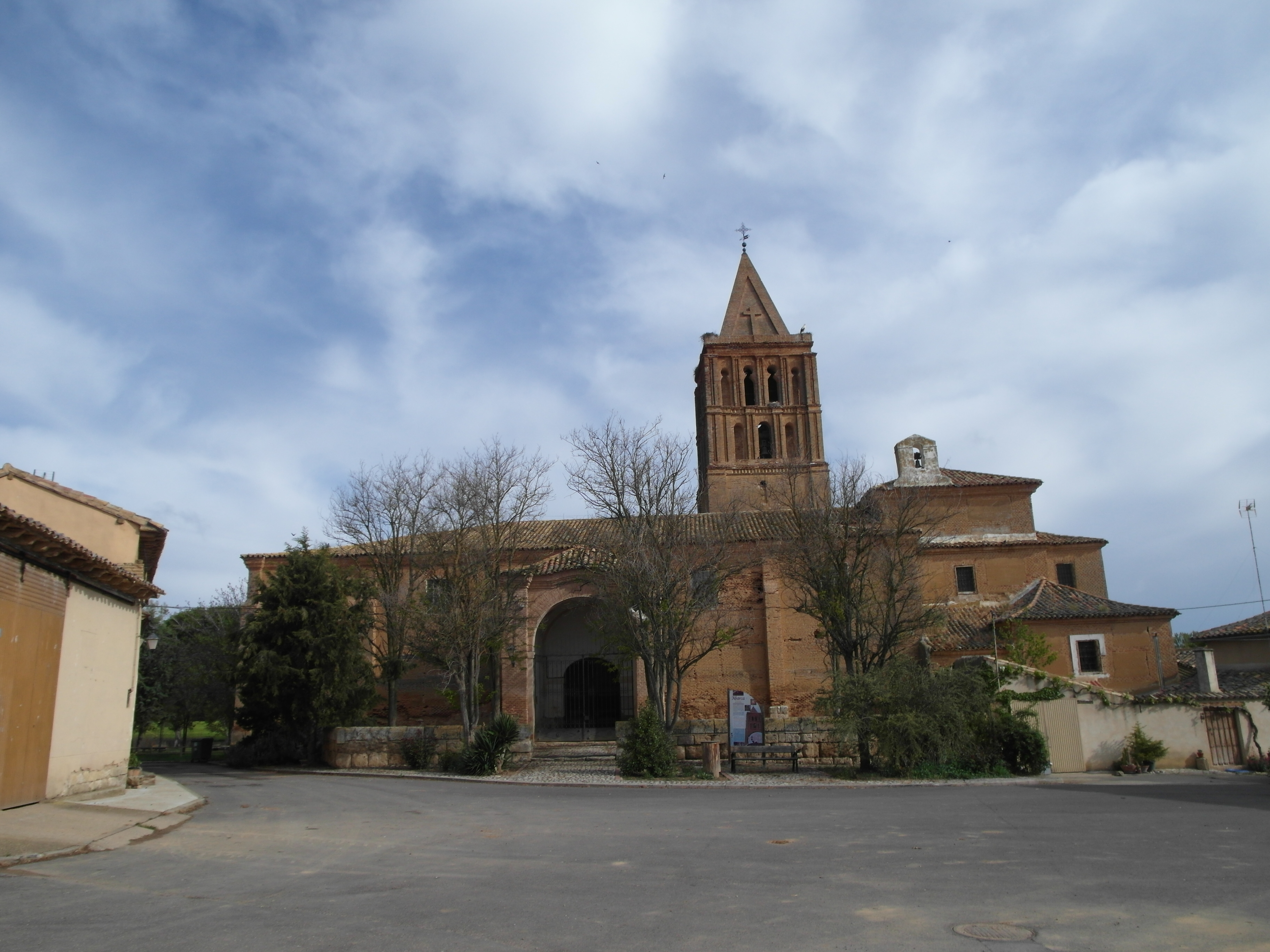

- Coat of arms
- Interactive map of Abarca de Campos
- Country: Spain
- Autonomous community: Castile and León
- Province: Palencia
- Municipality: Abarca de Campos

Area
  - Total: 11.39 km^{2} (4.40 sq mi)
- Elevation: 758 m (2,487 ft)

Population (2025-01-01)
  - Total: 38
  - Density: 3.3/km^{2} (8.6/sq mi)
- Time zone: UTC+1 (CET)
  - Summer (DST): UTC+2 (CEST)
- Website: Official website

Abarca de Campos is a municipality located in the province of Palencia, Castile and León, Spain. According to the 2025 census (INE), the municipality had a population of 38 inhabitants.
