= Margaret Roxan =

British archaeologist and expert on Roman military diplomas

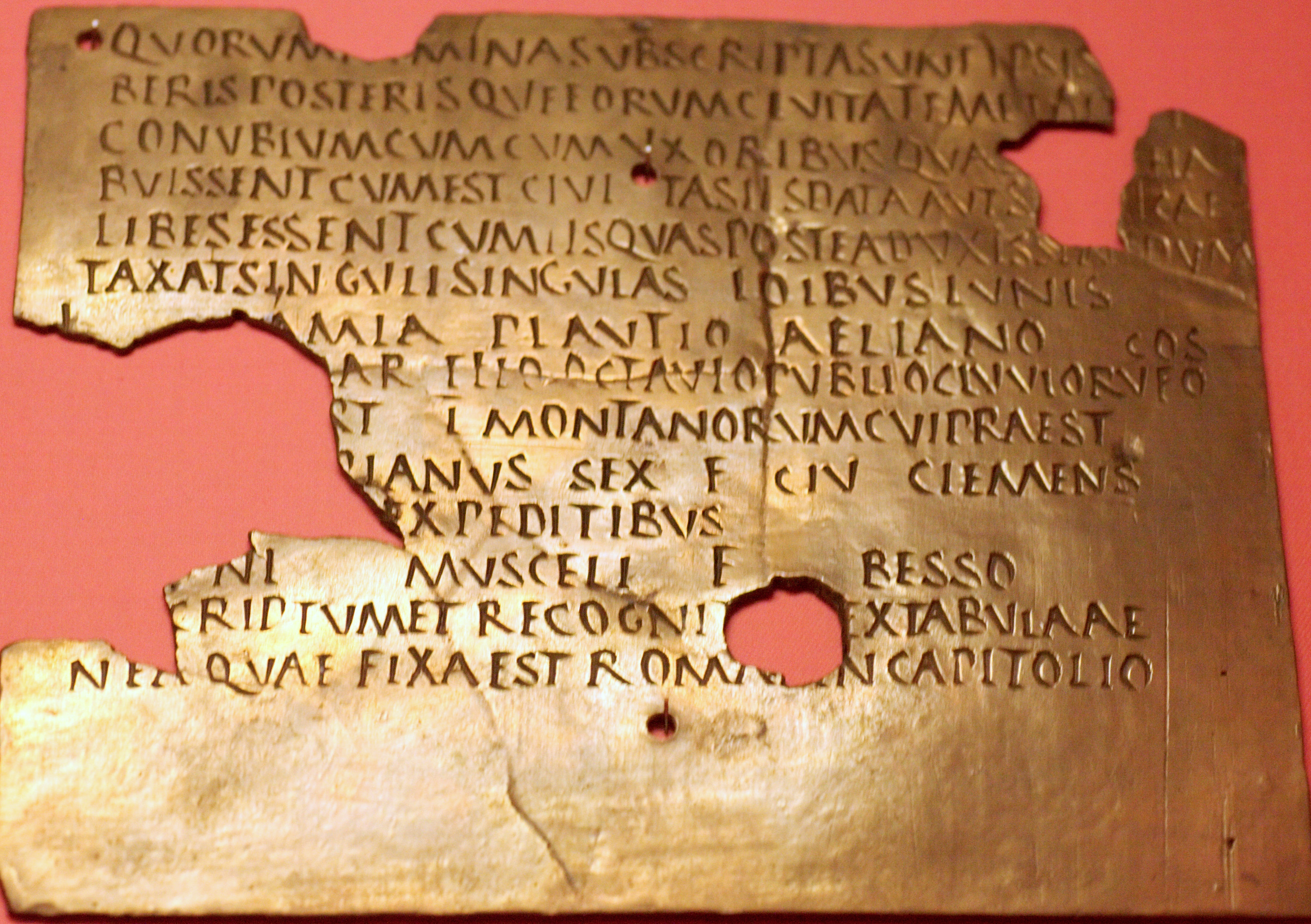
Roman military diploma from Carnuntum

Margaret Roxan FSA (1924–2003) was a British archaeologist and expert on Roman military diplomas. Her major contribution to the discipline was three edited collections of newly-found diplomas that acquired a scholarly authority and place as the direct successor of Theodor Mommsen and Herbert Nesselhauf. She also edited the diplomas for publication in The Roman Inscriptions of Britain.

== Education and career ==
Although her first degree was awarded in Psychology from University College London in 1948, in 1960 she started a university extension course in archaeology. She earned a diploma with distinction from the Institute of Archaeology in 1967, and she gained her PhD some six years later. Her thesis topic was on the auxiliary regiments of the Iberian peninsula. After being awarded her doctorate she lectured at the London University extramural department and the Inner London Education Authority.

She undertook her research for over thirty years with minimal help in kind from a number of institutions, including an Honorary Research Fellowship at the Institute of Archaeology and then at the Institute of Classical Studies in Senate House. Much of her work took place in a tiny room she was granted on the fourth floor of the Institute of Archaeology. Through her numerous publications she made sure the discovery of new military diplomas were made promptly available, travelling widely within Europe to do so, and making her expertise available in connection with the diplomas emerging from eastern Europe.

Through her publications she illuminated the potential for Roman military diplomas as a source material and the significance of the information that could be gleaned from their study. For example, one diploma, issued to a soldier in the army of Britain on 23 March 178, was found in Bulgaria. It was shown to Margaret in the 1990s, and she showed it was possible to clarify—and challenge—part of the account of the suppression of an invasion of Britain given by the Graeco-Roman historian Cassius Dio. Her work was noted for its care, skill and rigor.

== Honours ==
Margaret Roxan was elected a fellow of the Society of Antiquaries in 1981, and was a corresponding member of the German Archaeological Institute. She was awarded an emeritus fellowship by the Leverhulme Trust in 1993, which held a conference in her honour in May 2002.

== Personal life ==
Margaret Roxan (née Quantrill) was born on 21 January 1924 in Hackney, London. In 1945, she married David Roxan, a journalist, with whom she had five children, and remained married to him until his death in 1999. She died on 26 June 2003.

== Selected publications ==
- 1977 (with J. Morris) The witnesses to Roman military diplomata ', Arheoloski Vestnik 28, 299-333.
- 1978 Roman military diplomas 1954-77, Institute of Archaeology Occasional Publication No. 2 (London 1978).
- 1983 Mann, J. C., Legionary recruitment and veteran settlement during the Principáte, edited for publication by M. M. Roxan, Institute of Archaeology Occasional Publication No. 7 (London 1983
- 1985 Roman military diplomas 1978-1984, with contributions by H. Ganiaris and J. C. Mann, Institute of Archaeology Occasional Publication No. 9 (London 1985).
- 1988 (with J. C. Mann) 'Discharge certificates of the Roman army', Britannia 19, 341-47. [Reprinted in J. C. Mann, Britain and the Roman Empire (London 1966) 29
- 1989 'Findspots of military diplomas of the Roman auxiliary army', Bulletin of the Institute of Archaeology 26, 127-81.
- 1990 The military diplomata', R. G. Collingwood and R. P. Wright, The Roman inscriptions of Britain, Vol. II, fase. 1, ed. S. S. Frere, M. Roxan and R. S. O. Tomlin. (Oxford 1990)
- 1991 'Women on the frontiers', Roman Frontier Studies 1989. Proceedings of the XVth international Congress of Roman Frontier Studies, ed. V. A. Maxfield and M. J. Dobson (Exeter 1991), 462-67
- 1994 Roman military diplomas 1985-93, Institute of Archaeology Occasional Publication No. 14 (London 1994).
- 1995 'The hierarchy of the auxilia. Promotion prospects in the auxilia and work done in the last twenty years', La Hiérarchie (Rangordnung) de l'armée romaine sous le Haut-Empire. Actes du Congrès de Lyon (15-18 septembre 1994), rassemblés et édités par Y. Le Bohec (Paris 1995) 139-46
- 1997 'Settlement of veterans of the auxilia - a preliminary study', Roman Frontier Proceedings of the XVIth International Congress of Roman Frontier W. Groenman-van Waateringe, B. L. van Beek, W. J. H. Willems, and S. L. Wynia (Oxford 1997) 483-91
- 2000 'Veteran settlement of the auxilia in Germania', Kaiser, Heer und Gesellschaft in der Römischen Kaiserzeit : Gedankschrfit für Eric Birley, Hrsg. G. Alföldy, B. Dobson, W. Eck (Stuttgart 2000) 307-26.
- 2002 'Vespasianus Velageno', Limes XVIII: Proceedings of the XVIIIth International Congress of Roman Frontier Studies held in Amman, Jordan ( September 2000), ed. P. Freeman, J. Bennett, Z. T. Fiema and B. Hoffmann, BAR International Series 1084 (Oxford 2002) 2v. 945-48.
- 2003 M. M. Roxan and P. A. Holder: Roman military diplomas IV, BICS Supplement 82 (London 2003). (with P. A. Holder) 'A diploma of the Ravenna Fleet: 1 August 142', Zeitschrift für Papyrologie und Epigraphik.
