= Pomar de Valdivia =

Coordinates: 42°46′N 4°10′W

- municipality
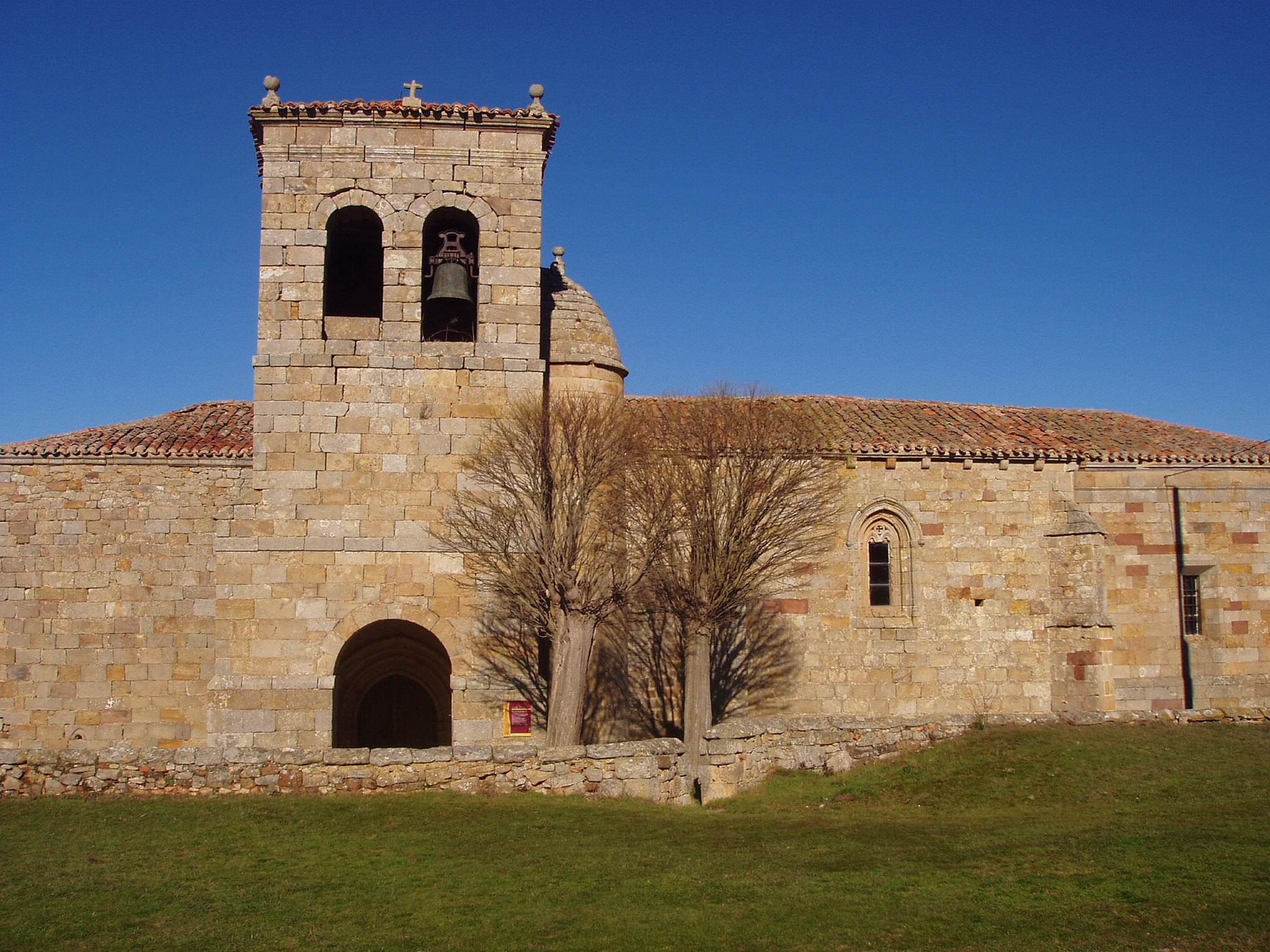

- Flag Coat of arms
- Interactive map of Pomar de Valdivia
- Country: Spain
- Autonomous community: Castile and León
- Province: Palencia

Area
  - Total: 79 km^{2} (31 sq mi)

Population (2025-01-01)
  - Total: 488
  - Density: 6.2/km^{2} (16/sq mi)
- Time zone: UTC+1 (CET)
  - Summer (DST): UTC+2 (CEST)
- Website: Official website

Pomar de Valdivia is a municipality located in the province of Palencia, Castile and León, Spain. According to the 2004 census (INE), the municipality has a population of 531 inhabitants.
