= Hermitage of Santa Eulalia =

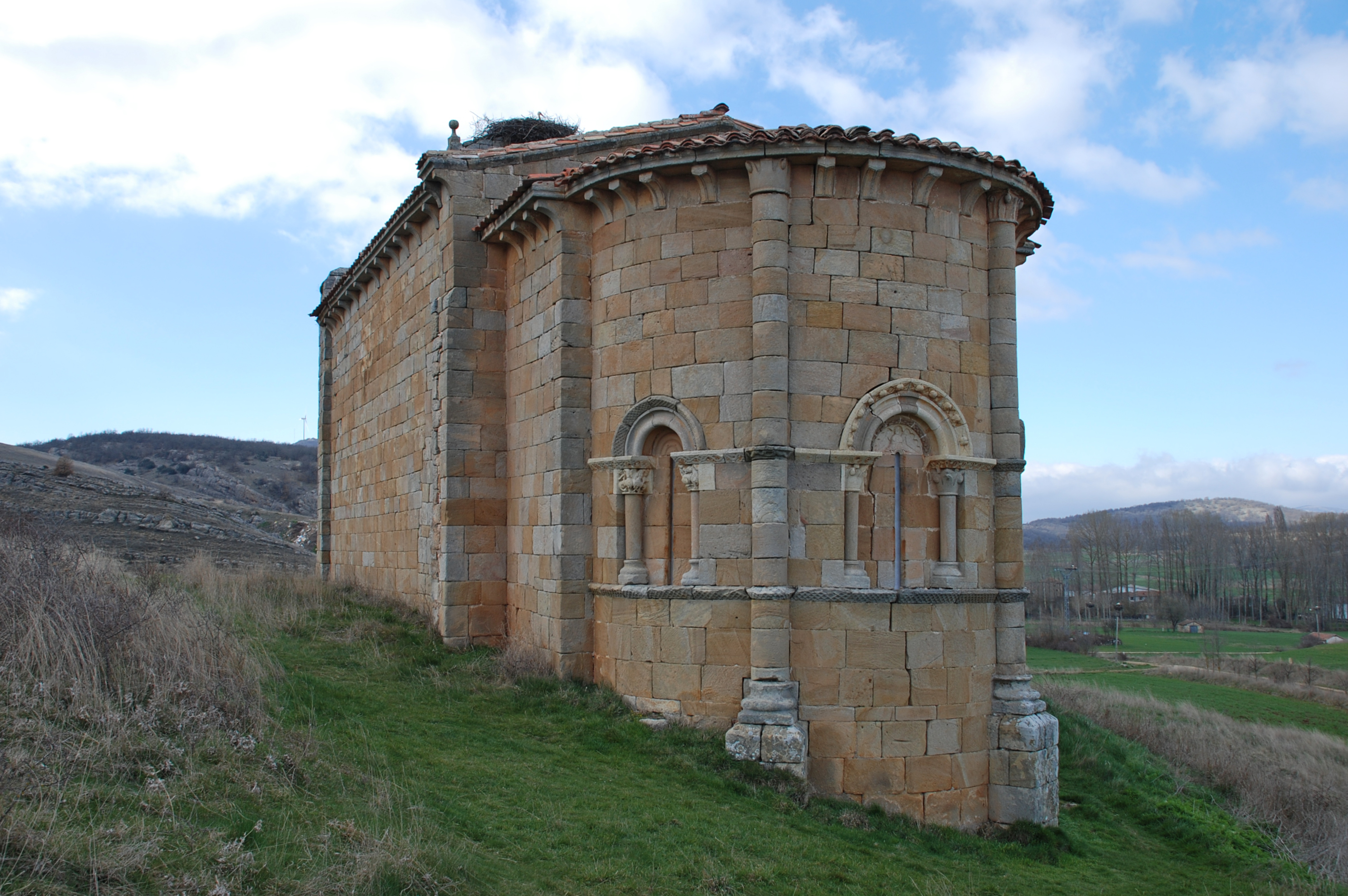
- View of the hermitage

- Location within Spain
- 42°48′37.2″N 4°22′31.7″W
- Location: Barrio de Santa María, Aguilar de Campoo, Province of Palencia, Spain

Architecture
- Heritage designation: Bien de Interés Cultural

The Hermitage of Santa Eulalia is a historic church located in Barrio de Santa María, a village in the municipality of Aguilar de Campoo (Province of Palencia, Castile and León, Spain).

It was built in the late 1 or early 1 as the parish church of a deserted medieval village called Santa Olalla, already abandoned by the Middle Ages. It stands on a hill on the outskirts of the present-day village of Barrio de Santa María, which has its own parish church. It preserves Romanesque wall paintings and was declared a site of cultural interest (bien de interés cultural), with the category of Historic-Artistic Monument, on 20 January 1966.

== Description ==
The church is built of regularly dressed sandstone. The current bell tower on the west façade was built in the 1. On the north side — an unusual orientation for portals of this type of building — set into a narrow roofed porch, there is a slightly pointed portal with four archivolts resting on plain capitals with imposts. The imposts are decorated with small heads, animals and interlacing bands.

The single nave is divided into four bays covered by a pointed barrel vault, with three transverse arches resting on attached semi-columns and decorated capitals. A pointed, triple triumphal arch, also on attached semi-columns, leads into the presbytery, which has a straight bay with a pointed barrel vault and a semicircular apse covered by a half-dome vault with three windows.

Two three-quarter columns divide the outer wall of the apse into three bays, each with a round-arched window. The apse windows have elaborately carved capitals. One capital, known as "Adam and Eve and the Tree of Paradise", depicts the Fall of Man; a lintel shows the serpent. The central bay of the apse has a tympanum in its arched field, depicting a bearded figure with outstretched wings beneath a crenellated arch.

=== Wall paintings ===
The church's wall paintings date from the 1. The apse dome is occupied by a mural depicting a Pantocrator surrounded by a mandorla. The pendentives originally held the symbols of the Evangelists, of which only the lion of Mark and the ox of Luke survive. Better preserved are the paintings on the side walls of the choir, showing scenes of the Last Judgment, the punishments of hell, and Saint Michael weighing souls. The paintings underwent restoration work carried out by the Centro de Estudios del Románico de Aguilar de Campoo in 1989.

== Bibliography ==
- Jaime Cobreros: Las Rutas del Románico en España. Vol. 1, Madrid 2004, ISBN 84-9776-010-7, p. 106.
- Carlos M. Martín Jiménez: Las mejores rutas por el Románico de Palencia. Edilesa, León 2008, ISBN 978-84-8012-632-8, p. 142–145.
- César del Valle Barreda: Antigua Merindad de Aguilar de Campoo. Fundación Santa María la Real, Aguilar de Campoo 2009, ISBN 978-84-89483-55-2, p. 23.
