= Aguilar de Campoo =

- Municipality
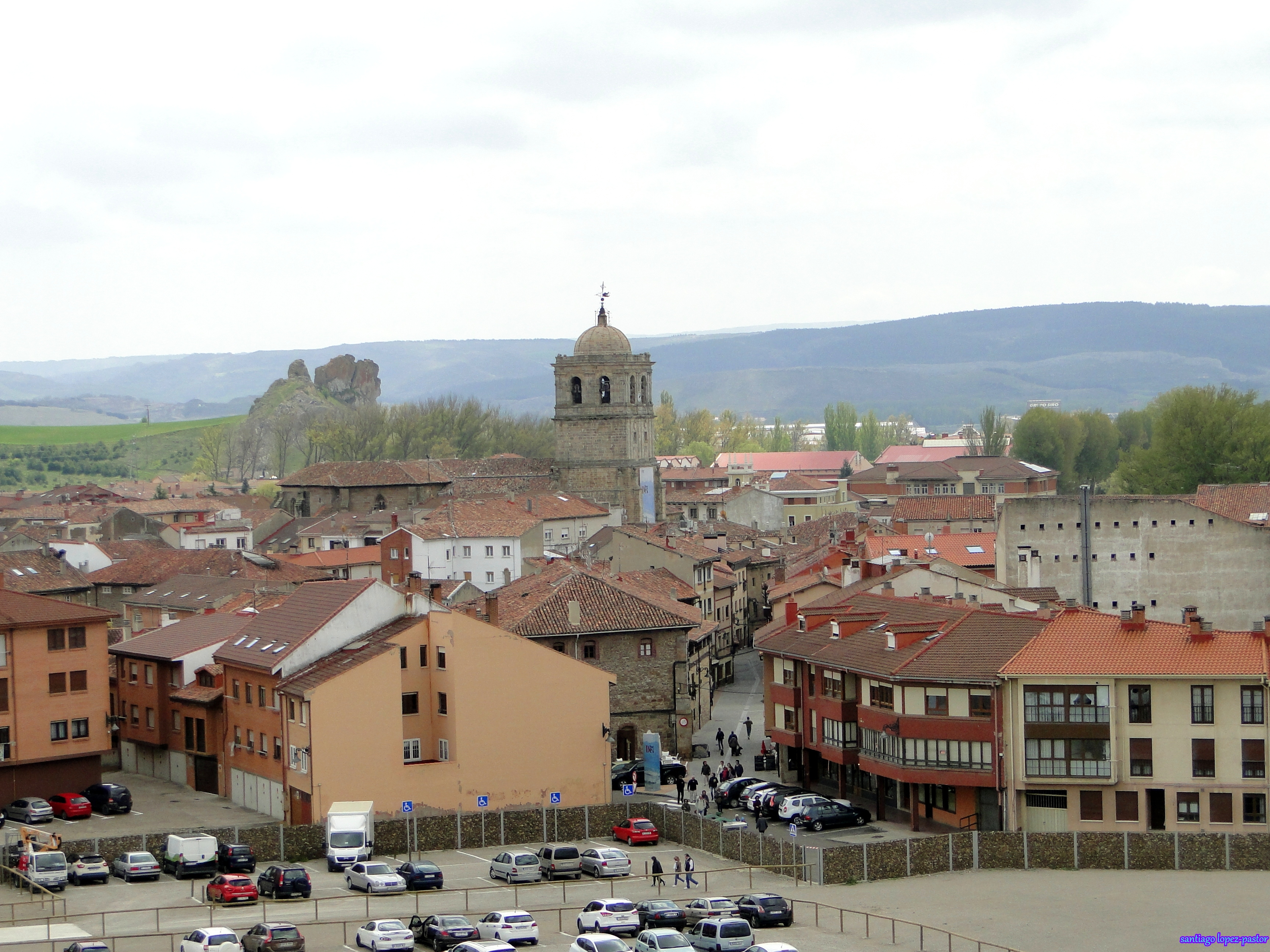

- Coat of arms

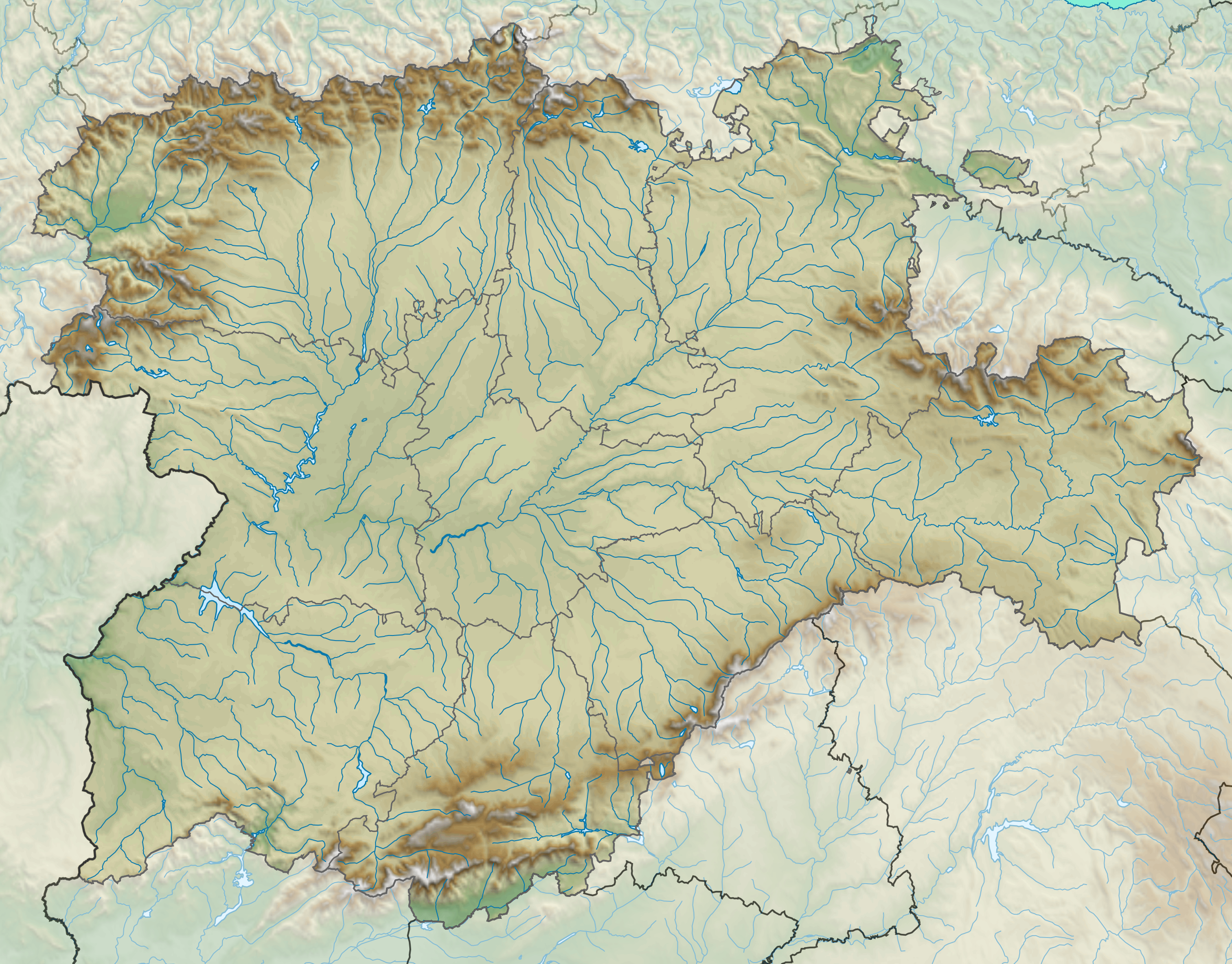
- Location in Spain Aguilar de Campoo (Spain)
- Coordinates: 42°48′N 4°16′W
- Country: Spain
- Autonomous community: Castile and León
- Province: Palencia

Government
  - Mayor: María José Ortega Gómez

Area
  - Total: 30.62 km^{2} (11.82 sq mi)
- Elevation: 892 m (2,927 ft)

Population (2025-01-01)
  - Total: 6,916
  - Density: 225.9/km^{2} (585.0/sq mi)
- Demonym: Aguilarenses
- Time zone: UTC+1 (CET)
  - Summer (DST): UTC+2 (CEST)
- Postal code: 34800

Aguilar de Campoo (Spanish pronunciation: [aɣiˈlaɾ ðe kamˈpo]) is a town and municipality of Spain located in the North of province of Palencia, autonomous community of Castile and León. The River Pisuerga flows through its historic centre. Its 2011 population was 7741.

It is one of the locations of the St. James' Northern Way (Ruta del Besaya). Since 2017, the municipality has been included in the Geopark of Las Loras, the first UNESCO Geopark in Castile and León.

== History ==
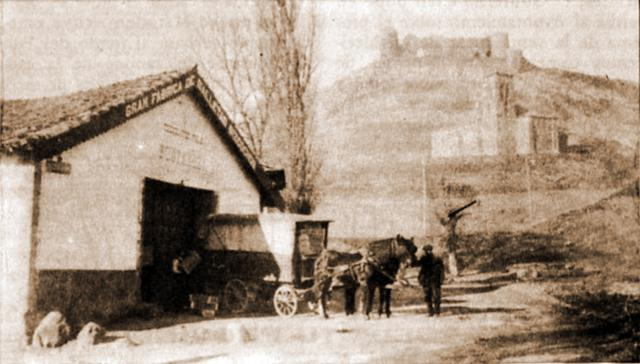
The primitive biscuit factory of Galletas Fontaneda by 1920

In May 1255 Alfonso X the Wise granted Aguilar a royal fuero, and thus the town also became a realengo ('royal demesne'). The town maintained that status until 1332. The town featured a sizeable Jewish community in the middle ages.

Gullón and Fontaneda opened biscuit factories in 1904 and 1913, respectively, and the town acquired a reputation as a renowned biscuit-making centre in Spain in the 20th century.

In medieval times, Aguilar de Campoo was home to a Jewish community. The earliest documentation of Jews in Aguilar de Campoo dates to 1187. The Jewish community was decimated after the 1492 expulsion of the Jews. Over the Reinosa Gate, one of the gates of the city, is an inscription of Judeo-Castilian (Castilian language written in Hebrew letters) detailing who built the gate.

== Main sights ==
=== Religious architecture ===
- Monastery of Santa María la Real (11th-13th centuries)
- Collegiate Church of San Miguel (11th-16th centuries)
- Church of Olleros de Pisuerga (7th-9th centuries)
- Hermitage of Santa Cecilia (12th century)
- Church of San Andrés (12th century)
- Hermitage of Santa Eulalia, in Barrio de Santa María (12th-13th centuries)
- Monastery of Santa Clara (founded in 1430)

== Civil architecture ==
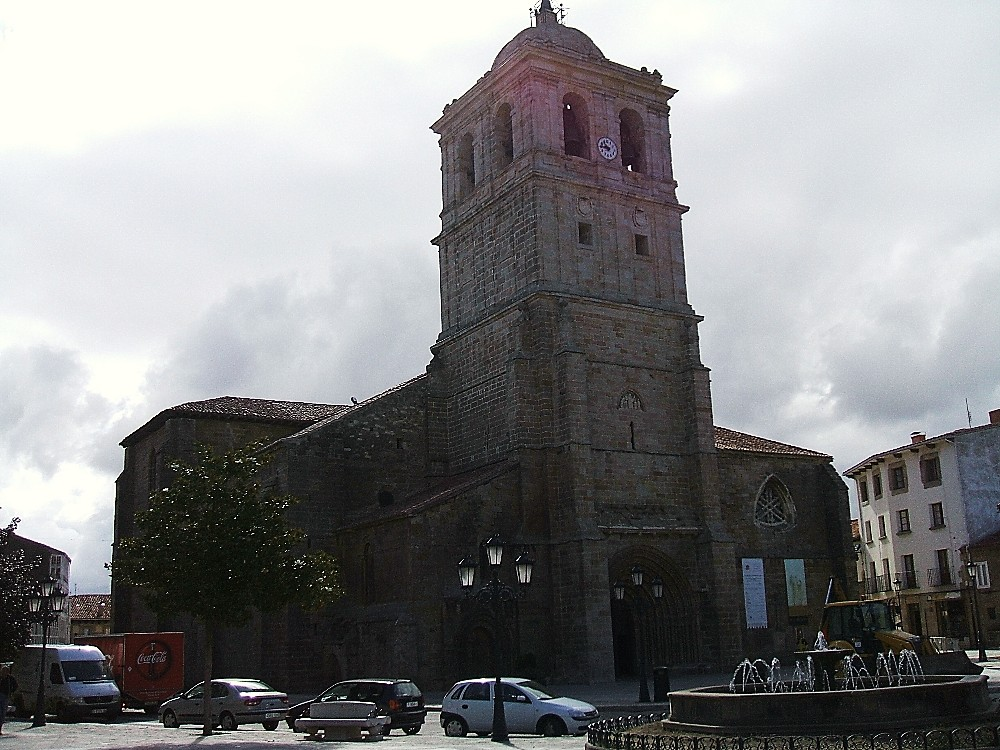
Collegiate Church of Saint Michael, Aguilar de Campoo

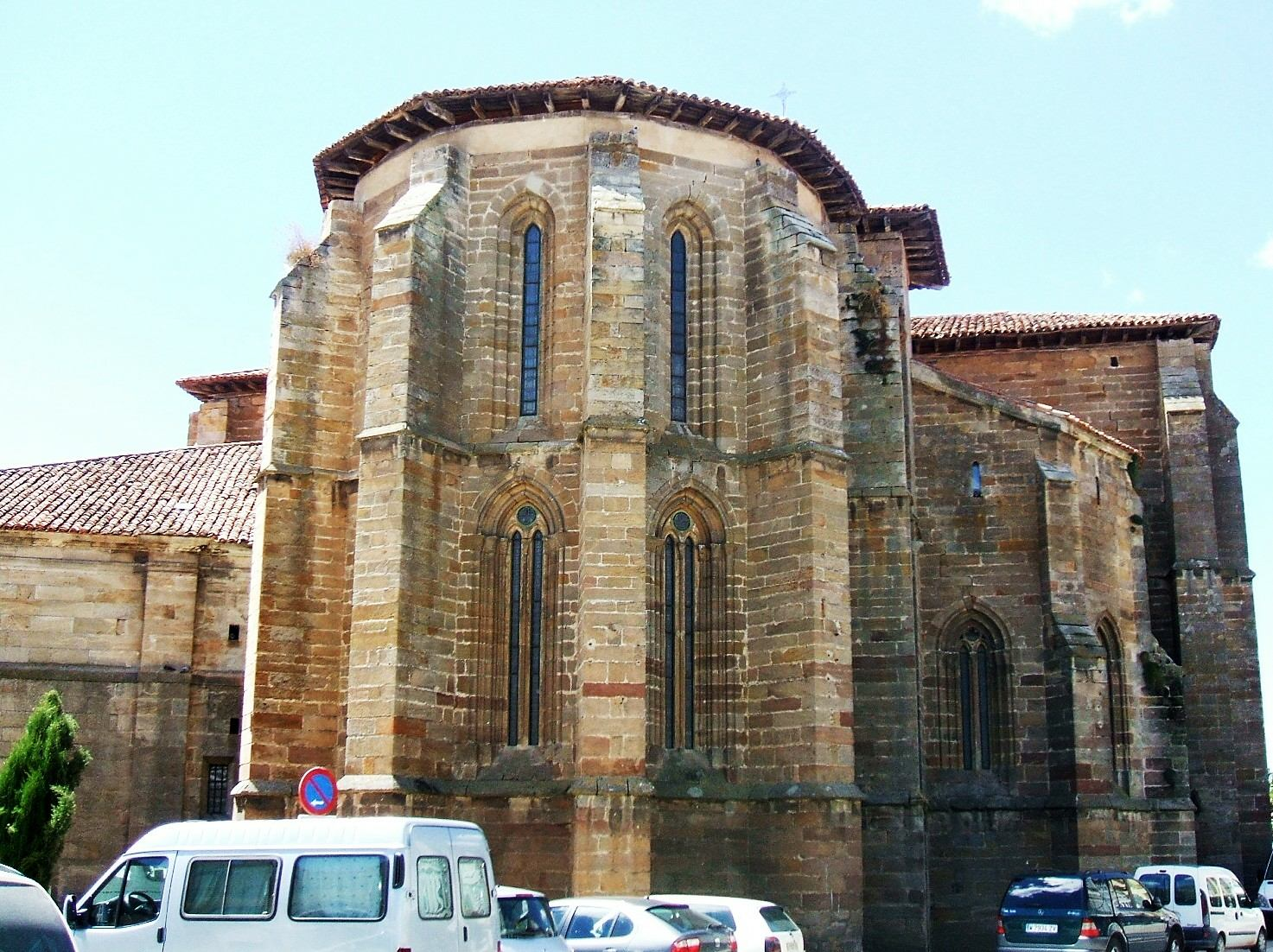
Apse of the Collegiate Church of Saint Michael

- Medieval castle
- Major Square
- Palace of the Manrique (Marquess of Aguilar de Campoo)
- Palace of the Villalobos-Solorzano
- Palace of the Marquises of Villatorre
- House of the Priest
- House of Santa Mª La Real
- House of the Marcos Gutierrez
- House of the Seven Linajes (lineages)
- House of the Velardes
- Medieval walls and gates

== Bridges ==
- Major Bridge
- Bridge of Portazgo
- Bridge of Turruntero Mill
- Bridge of la Teja
- Bridges of Paseo de la Cascajera
- Bridges of Tenerias

== Economy ==
Galletas Gullón, a leading manufacturer of biscuits in Spain and Europe, is headquartered in Aguilar de Campoo.
