= Baquerín de Campos =

Coordinates: 42°01′N 4°47′W

- municipality
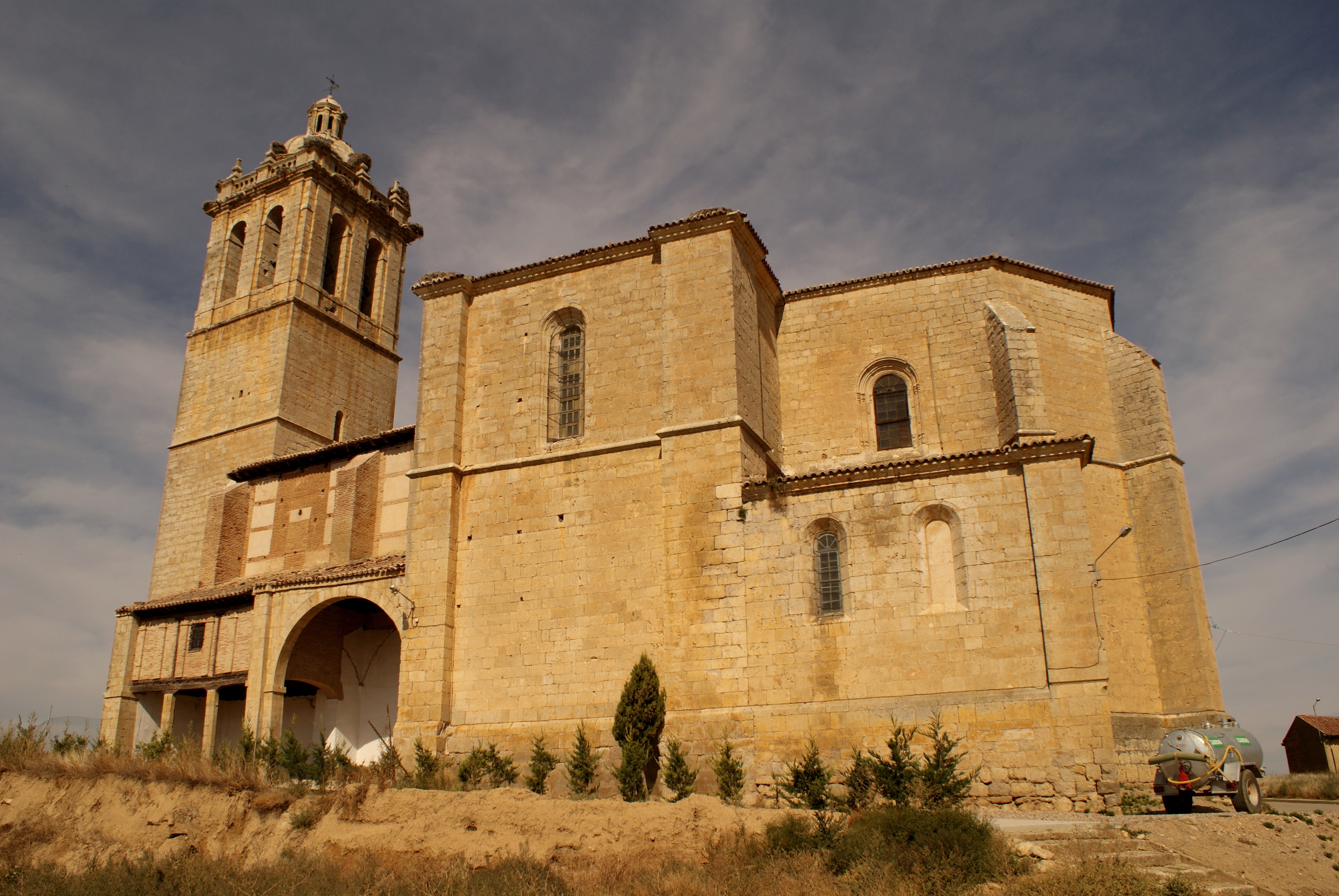
- Interactive map of Baquerín de Campos
- Country: Spain
- Autonomous community: Castile and León
- Province: Palencia
- Municipality: Baquerín de Campos

Area
  - Total: 22.11 km^{2} (8.54 sq mi)
- Elevation: 736 m (2,415 ft)

Population (2025-01-01)
  - Total: 20
  - Density: 0.90/km^{2} (2.3/sq mi)
- Time zone: UTC+1 (CET)
  - Summer (DST): UTC+2 (CEST)
- Website: Official website

Baquerín de Campos is a municipality located in the province of Palencia, Castile and León, Spain. According to the 2004 census (INE), the municipality had a population of 24 inhabitants.

It is the birthplace of the protomartyr saint of China Francis Ferdinand de Capillas.
