= Villerías de Campos =

Coordinates: 41°56′N 4°51′W

- municipality
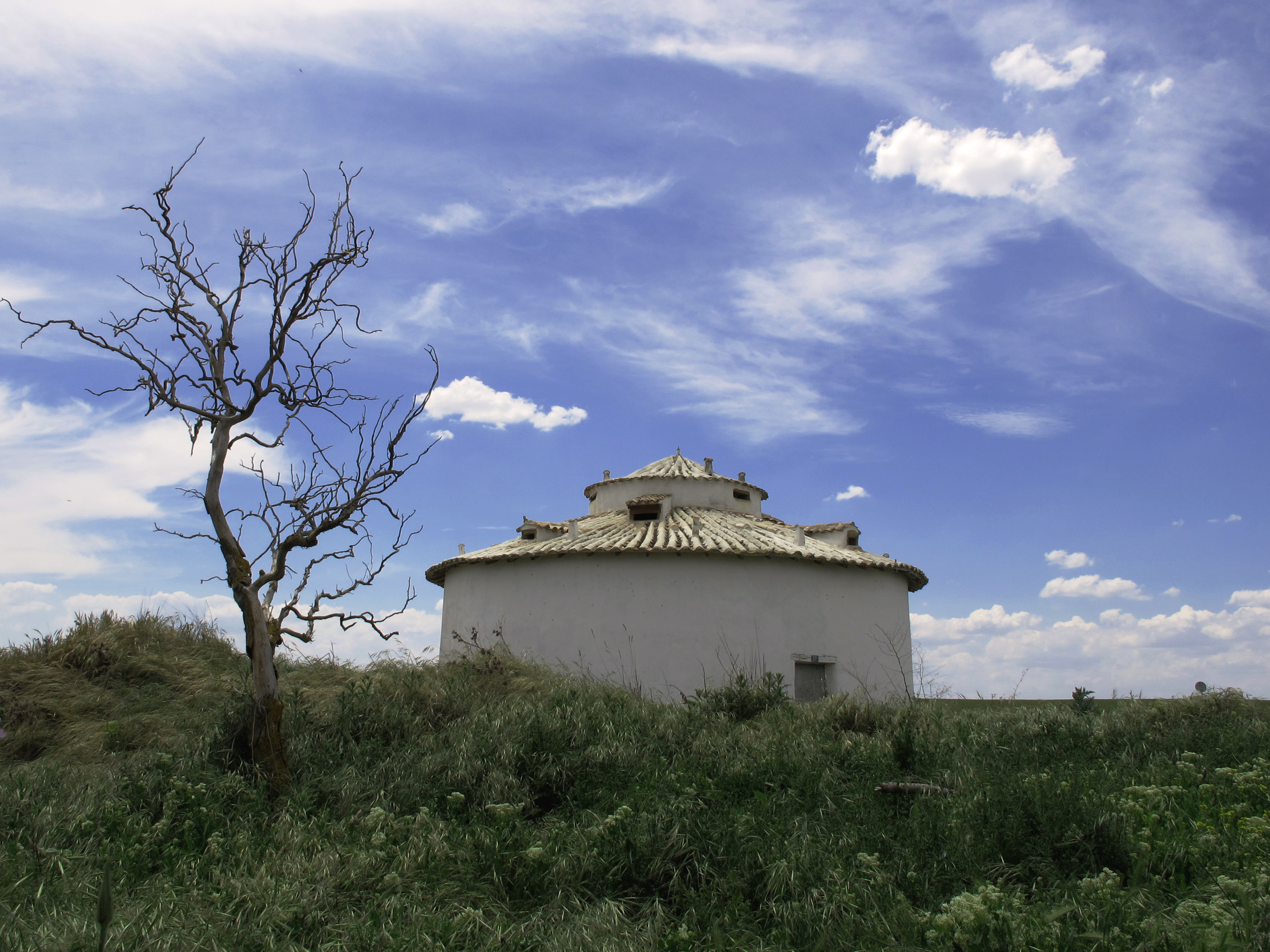
- Interactive map of Villerías de Campos
- Country: Spain
- Autonomous community: Castile and León
- Province: Palencia
- Municipality: Villerías de Campos

Area
  - Total: 22 km^{2} (8.5 sq mi)

Population (2025-01-01)
  - Total: 71
  - Density: 3.2/km^{2} (8.4/sq mi)
- Time zone: UTC+1 (CET)
  - Summer (DST): UTC+2 (CEST)
- Website: Official website

Villerías de Campos is a municipality located in the province of Palencia, Castile and León, Spain. According to the 2022 census (INE), the municipality has a population of 82 inhabitants.
