= Astures =

Ancient Hispano-Celtic people

The Iberian Peninsula in the 3rd century BC.

The Astures or Asturs, also named Astyrs, were the Hispano-Celtic inhabitants of the northwest area of Hispania that now comprises almost the entire modern autonomous community of the Principality of Asturias, the modern province of León, and the northern part of the modern province of Zamora (all in Spain), and eastern Trás os Montes in Portugal. They were a horse-riding highland cattle-raising people who lived in circular huts of stone drywall construction. The Albiones were a major tribe from western Asturias. Isidore of Seville gave an etymology as coming from a river Astura, identified by David Magie as the Órbigo River in the plain of León, and by others as the modern Esla River.

== Location ==
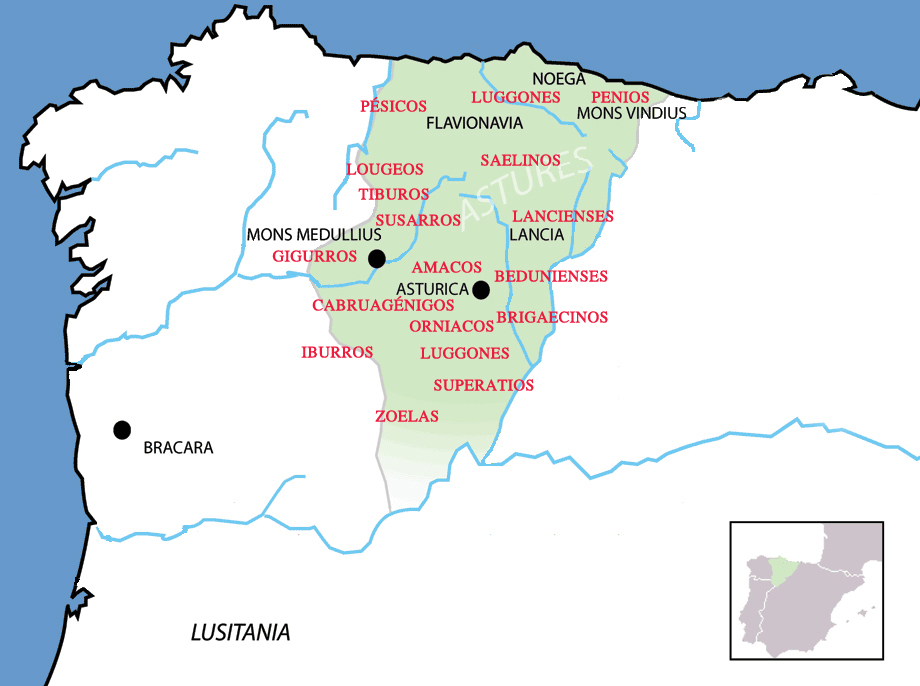
Conventus Asturum

The Asturian homeland encompassed the modern autonomous community of Asturias and the León, eastern Lugo, Orense, and northern Zamora provinces, along with the northeastern tip of the Portuguese region of Trás-os-Montes. Here they held the towns of Lancia (Villasabariego – León), Asturica (Astorga – León), Mons Medullius (Las Medulas? – León), Bergidum (Cacabelos, near Villafranca del Bierzo – León), Bedunia (Castro de Cebrones – León), Aliga (Alixa? – León), Curunda (Castro de Avelãs, Trás-os-Montes), Lucus Asturum (Lugo de Llanera – Asturias), Brigaetium (Benavente – Zamora), and Nemetobriga (A Pobra de Trives – Ourense), which was the religious center.

== Origins ==
The Astures may have been part of the early Hallstatt expansion that left the Bavarian-Bohemian homeland and migrated into Gaul, some continuing over the mountains into Spain and Portugal. By the 6th century BC, they occupied castros (hillforts), such as Coanna and Mohias near Navia on the coast of the Bay of Biscay. From the Roman point-of-view, expressed in the brief remarks of the historians Florus, epitomising Livy, and Orosius, the Astures were divided into two factions, following the natural division made by the alpine karst mountains of the Picos de Europa range: the Transmontani (located in the modern Asturias, "beyond"— that is, north of— the Picos de Europa) and Cismontani (located on the "near" side, in the modern area of León). The Transmontani, placed between the Navia River and the central massif of the Picos de Europa, comprised the Iburri, Luggones, Paesici, Paenii, Saelini, Vinciani, Viromenici and Baedunienses; the Cismontani included the Amaci, Cabruagenigi, Lancienses, Lougei, Tiburi, Brigaecini, Orniaci, Superatii, Gigurri, Zoelae and Susarri (which dwelled around Asturica Augusta, in the Astura river valley, and was the main Astur town in Roman times). Prior to the Roman conquest in the late 1st century BC, they were united into a tribal federation with the mountain-top citadel of Asturica (Astorga) as their capital.

== Culture ==
Recent epigraphic studies suggest that they spoke a ‘Q-Celtic’ language akin to the neighbouring Gallaeci Lucenses and Braccarenses (see Gallaecia). Although the Celtic language was lost during the Roman era, it still endures in many names of villages and geographical features, mostly associated to Celtic deities: the parish of Taranes and the villages of Tereñes, Táranu, Tarañu and Torañu related to the god Taranis, the parish of Lugones related to the god Lugus or the parish of Beleño related to the god Belenus, just to name a few.

According to classic authors, their family structure was matrilineal, whereby the woman inherits the ownership of property. The Astures lived in hill forts, established in strategic areas and built with round walls in today's Asturias and the mountainous areas of León, and with rectangular walls in flatter areas, similarly to their fellow Galicians. Their warrior class consisted of men and women and both sexes were considered fierce fighters.

=== Religion ===
Most of their tribes, like the Lugones, worshipped the Celtic god Lugh, and references to other Celtic deities like Taranis or Belenos still remain in the toponomy of the places inhabited by the Astures. They may have venerated the deity Busgosu.

=== Way of life ===
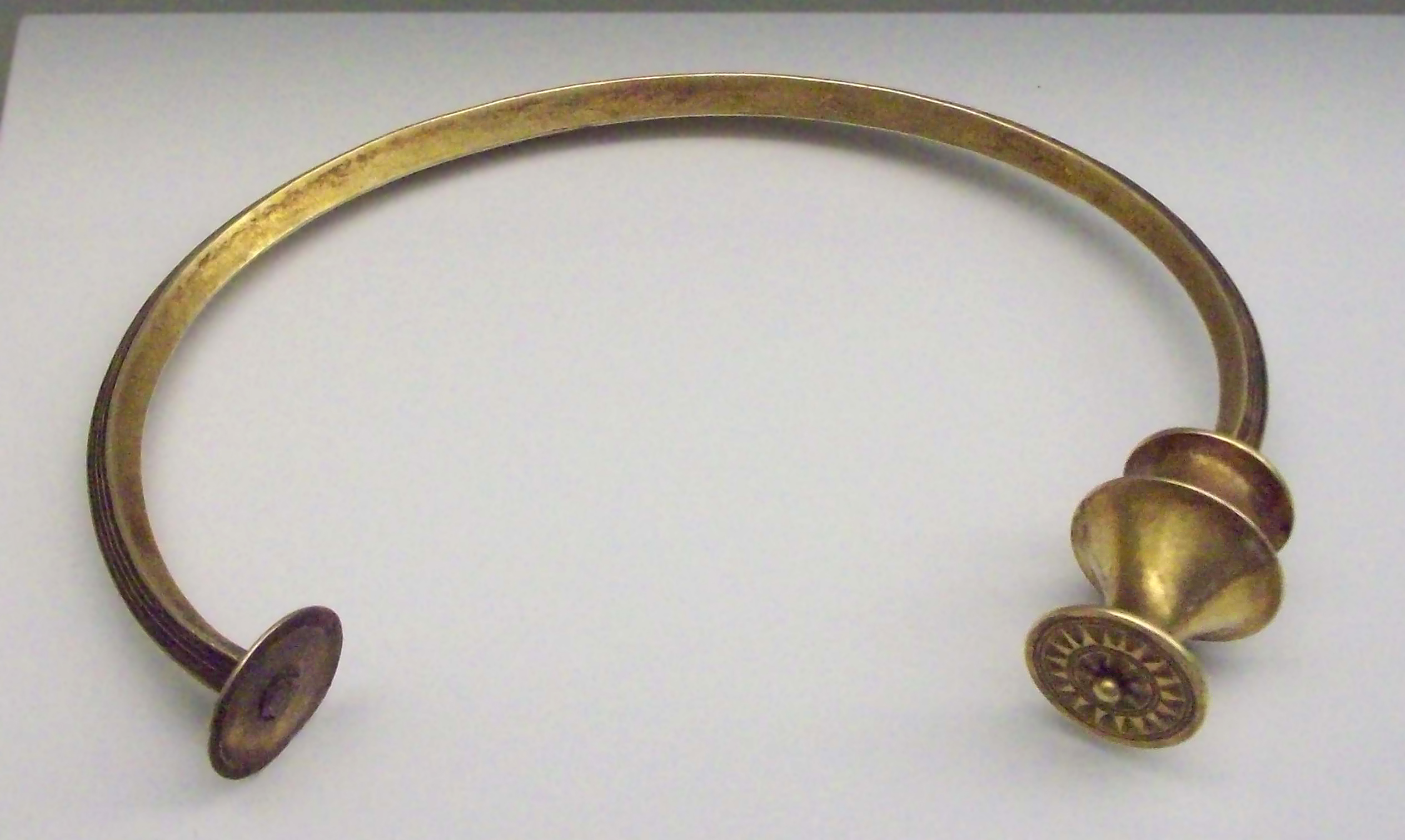
Gallaecian-Asturian gold torc (4th to 2nd century BC)

The Astures were vigorous agropastoralist highlanders who raided Roman outposts in the lowlands; a reputation enhanced by ancient authors, such as Florus ("Duae validissmae gentes, Cantabriae et Astures, immunes imperii agitabant") and Paulus Orosius ("duas fortissimas Hispaniae gentes"), but archeological evidence confirms that they also engaged in stock-raising in mountain pastures, complemented by subsistence farming on the slopes and in the lower valleys. They mostly reared sheep, goats, a few oxen and a local breed of mountain horse famed in Antiquity, the Asturcon, which still exists today. According to Pliny the Elder, these were small-stature saddle horses, slightly larger than ponies, of graceful walk and very fast, being trained for both hunting and mountain warfare.

During a large part of the year they used acorns as a staple food source, drying and powdering them and using the flour for a type of easily preserved bread; from their few sown fields that they had during the pre-Roman period, they harvested barley from which they produced beer (Zythos), as well as wheat and flax. Due to the scarcity of their agricultural production, as well as their strong war-like character, they made frequent incursions into the lands of the Vaccaei, who had a much more developed agriculture. Lucan calls them "Pale seekers after gold" ("Asturii scrutator pallidus auri").

== History ==
The Astures entered the historical record in the late 3rd century BC, being listed amongst the Iberian mercenaries of Hasdrubal Barca's army at the battle of Metaurus River in 207 BC. Silius Italicus also mentions an Astur mercenary contingent in Hannibal's army, led by a chieftain named Cydnus. After the 2nd Punic War, their history is less clear. Rarely mentioned in the ancient sources regarding the Lusitanian, Celtiberian or Sertorian Wars, the Astures re-emerged only at the later 1st Century BC, when they provided auxiliary troops to the Pompeian army led by the generals' Lucius Afranius and Marcus Petreius that faced Julius Caesar at the battle of Ilerda (Lérida) in 49 BC, during the 2nd Roman Civil War.

Led by Gausón, a former mercenary commander, the Astures joined forces with the Cantabri to resist Emperor Augustus's conquest of the whole of the Iberian northwest, even backing an unsuccessful Vaccaei revolt in 29 BC. The campaign against the Astures and Cantabri tribes proved so difficult that it required the presence of the emperor himself to bolster the seven legions and one naval squadron involved. The first Roman campaign against the Astures (the Bellum Asturicum), which commenced in the spring of 26 BC, was successfully concluded in 25 BC with the ceremonial surrender of Mons Medullus to Augustus in person, allowing the latter to return to Rome and ostentatiously close the gates of the temple of Janus that same year. The reduction of the remaining Asture holdouts was entrusted to Publius Carisius, the legate of Lusitania, who, after managing to trap Gauson and the remnants of his troops at the hillfort of Lancia, subsequently forced them to surrender when he threatened to set fire to the town. The Astures were subdued by the Romans but were never fully conquered, and their tribal way of life changed very little.

As far as the official Roman history was concerned, the fall of this last redoubt marked the conclusion of the conquest of the Asturian lands, which henceforth were included alongside Gallaecia and Cantabria into the new Transduriana Province under the suffect consul Lucius Sestius Albanianus Quirinalis. This was followed by the establishment of military garrisons at Castrum Legio VII Gemina (León) and Petavonium (Rosinos de Vidriales – Zamora), along with colonies at Asturica Augusta (Astorga) and Lucus Asturum (Lugo de Llanera – Asturias).

In spite of the harsh pacification policies implemented by Augustus, the Asturian country remained an unstable region subjected to sporadic revolts – often carried out in collusion with the Cantabri – and persistent guerrilla activity that kept the Roman occupation forces busy until the mid-1st century AD. New risings occurred in 24–22 BC (the 2nd Astur-Cantabrian War), in 20–18 BC (3rd Astur-Cantabrian 'War') – sparked off by runaway Cantabrian slaves returning from Gaul – both of which were brutally quashed by General Marcus Vipsanius Agrippa and again in 16–13 BC when Augustus crushed the last joint Astur-Cantabrian rebellion.

=== Romanization ===
Incorporated into the Roman province of Hispania Tarraconensis, the assimilation of the Asturian region into the Roman world was a slow and hazardous process, with its partially romanized people retaining the Celtic language, religion and much of their ancient culture throughout the Roman Imperial period. This included their martial traditions, which enabled them to provide the Roman Army with several auxiliary cavalry and infantry units (Ala I Asturum, Ala II Asturum, Cohors I Asturum, Cohors II Asturum, Cohors V Asturum, Cohors VI Asturum, Cohors I Asturum et Callaecorum) that participated in Emperor Claudius's invasion of Britain in AD 43–60, and which continued to serve into the late Empire. However, epigraphic evidence in the form of an inscribed votive stele dedicated by a Primipilus Centurion of Legio VI Victrix decorated for bravery in action confirms that the Astures staged a revolt in AD 54, prompting another vicious guerrilla war – unrecorded by surviving ancient sources – that lasted for fourteen years but the situation was finally calm around AD 68.

=== The early Middle Ages ===
During the Germanic invasions, the Astures resisted Suevi and Visigoth raids throughout the 5th century AD, only to be ultimately defeated and absorbed into the Visigothic Kingdom by the Visigothic King Sisebut in the early 6th century AD. However, the Astures continued to rebel, with King Wamba sending an expedition to the Asturian lands only twenty years before the Muslim invasion of the peninsula and the fall of the Visigothic kingdom. The Astures chose Pelagius of Asturias as their leader and in due course formed the Kingdom of Asturias.

== Legacy ==
Maximum extension of Kingdom of Asturias, circa 910 AD. King Alfonso III of Asturias, (848 – 910)

At a later date, in the beginning of the Reconquista period in the early Middle Ages, their name was preserved in the medieval Kingdom of Asturias and in the modern town of Astorga, León, whose designation still reflects its early Roman name of Asturica Augusta, the "Augustan settlement of the Astures".

== See also ==
- Asturian people
- Astur-Cantabrian Wars
- Cantabri
- Castro culture
- Eonavian
- Gallaeci
- Gallaecia
- Gausón
- Leonese language
- Leonese people
- Pre-Roman peoples of the Iberian Peninsula
