= Romanization of Hispania =

Cultural change in ancient Iberia

The Romanization of Hispania is the process by which Roman or Latin culture was introduced into the Iberian Peninsula during the period of Roman rule.

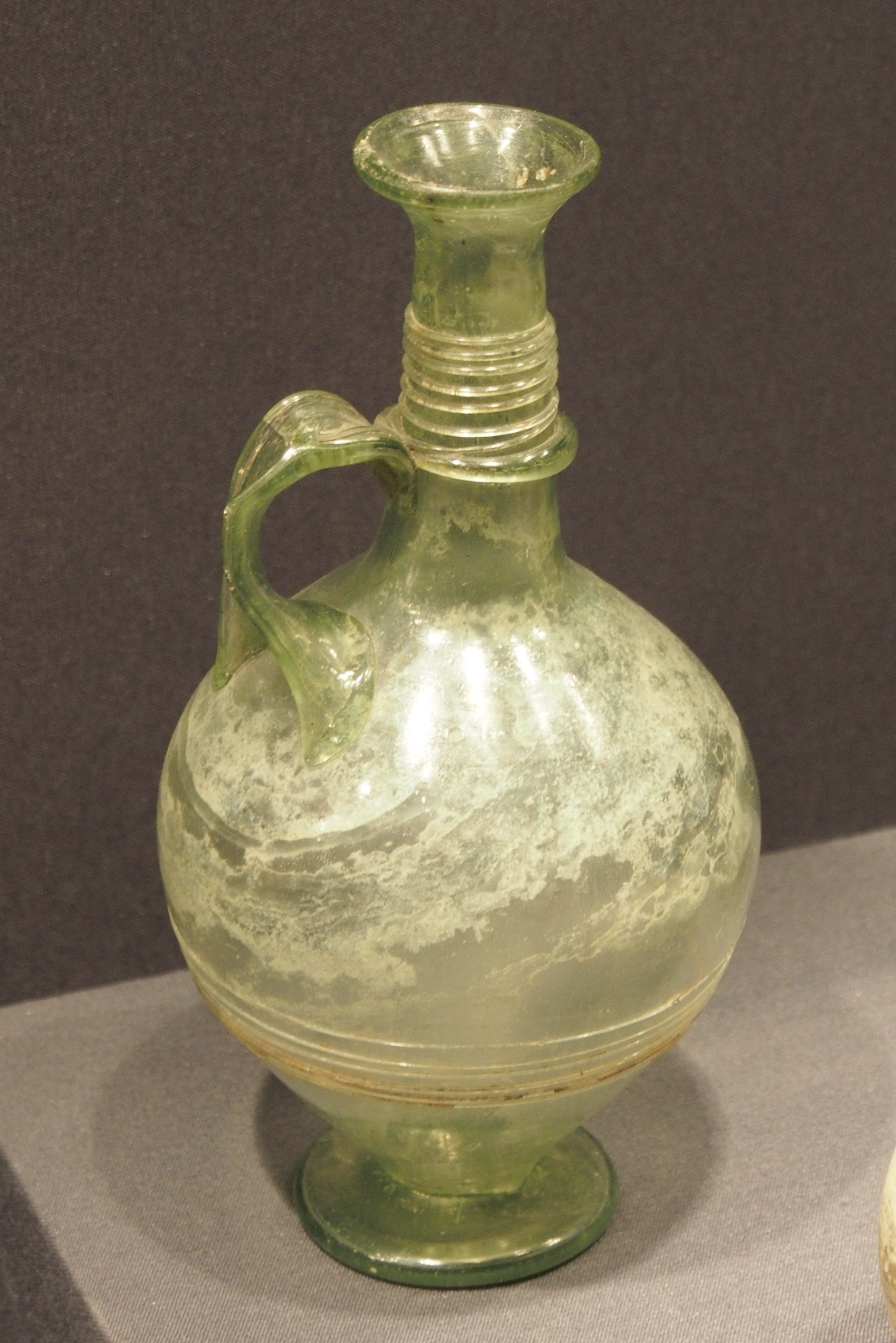
Glass jar, at the Museum of Valladolid. The Romans were pioneers in the technique of glass blowing

.

Throughout the centuries of Roman rule over the provinces of Hispania, Roman customs, religion, laws and the general Roman lifestyle gained much favour in the indigenous population. Together with a substantial minority of Roman immigrants, these eventually formed a distinct Hispano-Roman culture. Several factors aided the process of Romanization:

- Creation of civil infrastructure, including road networks and urban sanitation.
- Commercial interaction within regions and with the wider Roman world.
- Foundation of coloniae; settling Roman military veterans in newly created towns and cities.
- The spread of the hierarchical Roman administrative system throughout the Hispanic provinces.
- Growth of Roman aristocratic land holdings (latifundia).

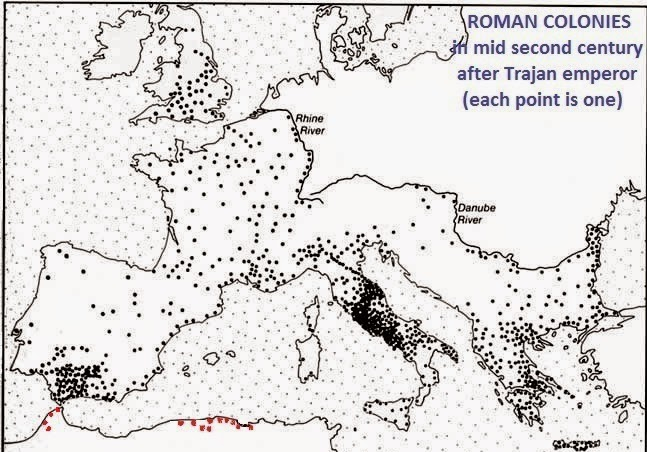
Roman coloniae in Hispania were highly concentrated in the south and along the Mediterranean coast but relatively sparse elsewhere

== Roman settlements ==
Although Roman influence had a major impact on existing cities in the peninsula, the largest urban development effort focused on newly constructed cities: Tarraco (modern Tarragona), Emerita Augusta (now Mérida) and Italica (in the present day Santiponce, near Seville).

Roman towns or settlements were conceived as images of the imperial capital in miniature. Public buildings were constructed by the curator operatum and were run directly by the supreme municipal magistrates.

To allocate public funds to any work, authorization from the emperor was needed. Patriotism and local euergetism encouraged local cities to compete, creating more affluent neighboring municipalities.

Public works undertaken with private funds did not need approval by the emperor. The planners decided the space needed for the houses, plazas and temples, the volume of water required and the number and width of streets. Soldiers collaborated in the construction of the city, as well as local craftsmen together with slaves.

=== Tarraco ===
Tarraco had its origin in the Roman military camp established by the co-consuls and brothers Gnaeus and Publius Cornelius Scipio in 218 BC, when commanding the landing on the Iberian Peninsula during the Second Punic War. The first mention of the city is by Pliny the Elder who characterizes the city as scipionum opus ("work of the Scipios") (Nat.Hist. III.21) and ends "... sicut Poenorum Carthago" (loosely translated, "... just like the original Carthage").

Tarraco was the capital at the outset of the Hispania Citerior during the Roman Republic, and later the very extensive Hispania Citerior Tarraconensis Province. Possibly around the year 45 BC Julius Caesar changed the status of city to a colonia, which is reflected in the epithet Iulia in its formal name: Colonia Iulia Urbs Triumphalis Tarraco, which remained for the duration of the Empire.

=== Emerita Augusta ===
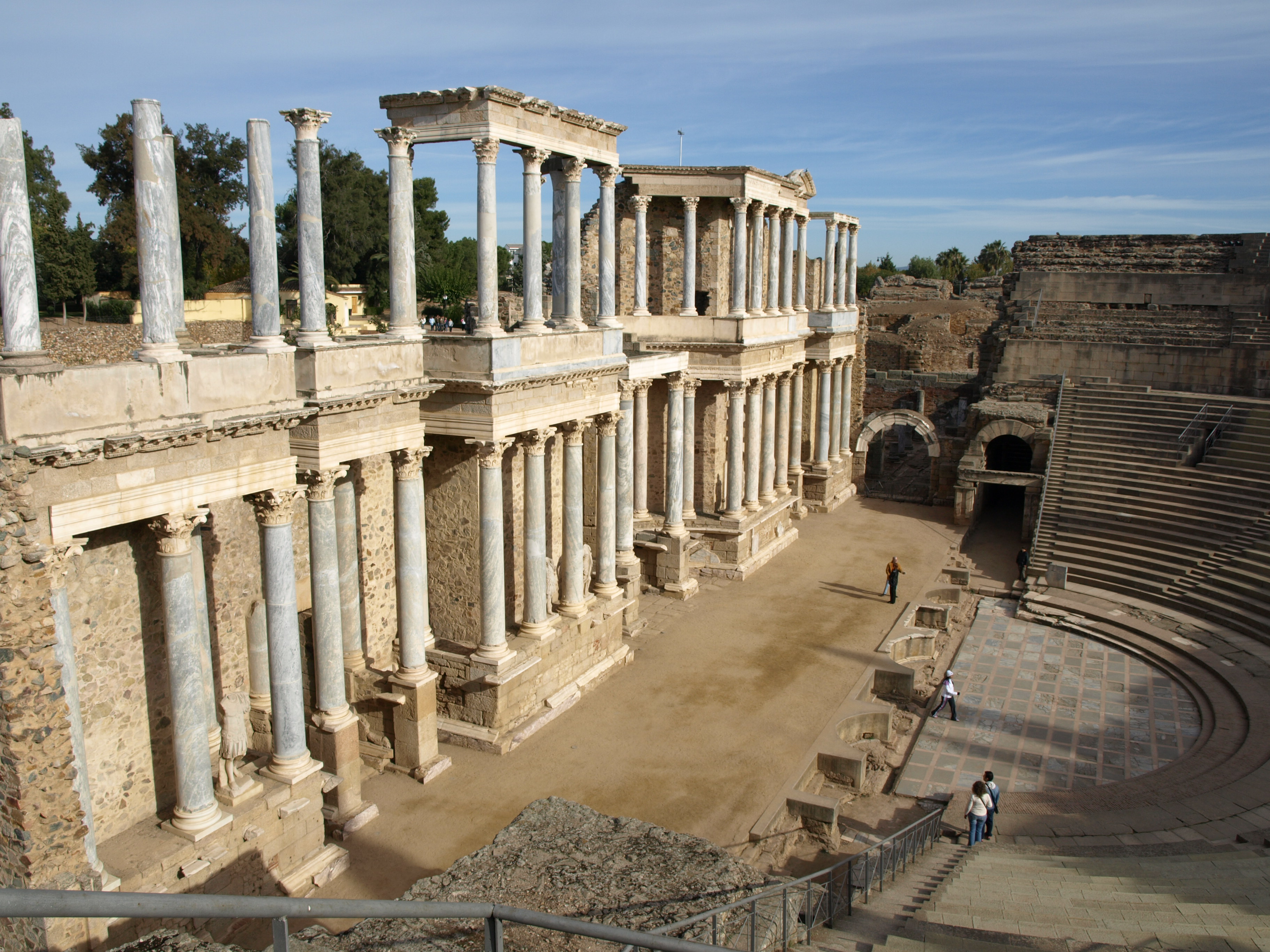
Roman Theatre at Mérida.

Emerita Augusta was founded in 25 BC by Publius Carisius, as the representative of the emperor Octavian Augustus as a resting place for troops discharged from the Fifth Legion (Alaudae) and Tenth Legion (Gemina). Over time, this city became one of the most important in Hispania, capital of the province of Lusitania and an economic and cultural center.

=== Italica ===
Italica (located where the city of Santiponce in the province of Seville stands today) was the first purely Roman city founded in Hispania. After the Second Punic War, Scipio Africanus divided land between the Roman legions in the Betis river valley (now the Guadalquivir), so that although Italica was created as a field hospital for the wounded from the Battle of Ilipa, later it became a settlement for veterans of war and then a municipality, on the west bank of the river Betis in 206 BC.

In the reign of Caesar Augustus, Italica gained the status of municipality, with the right to issue currency, but it came to its zenith during the reigns of the emperors Trajan and Hadrian at the end of the 1st century AD and during the 2nd century. These emperors originated from Italica, which would give great prestige to the former Spanish colony in Rome. Both emperors were particularly generous to their hometown, expanding and revitalizing its economy. Hadrian ordered the construction of the nova urbs, the new city, a city that had only had slight activity over the 3rd and 2nd centuries BC.

Also during the reign of Hadrian, the city changed its status to become a Roman colony. It was at this time renamed Colonia Aelia Augusta Italica, in honor of the emperor. By then, the Roman Senate had an important pressure group originating from the Spanish city.

=== Carthago Nova ===
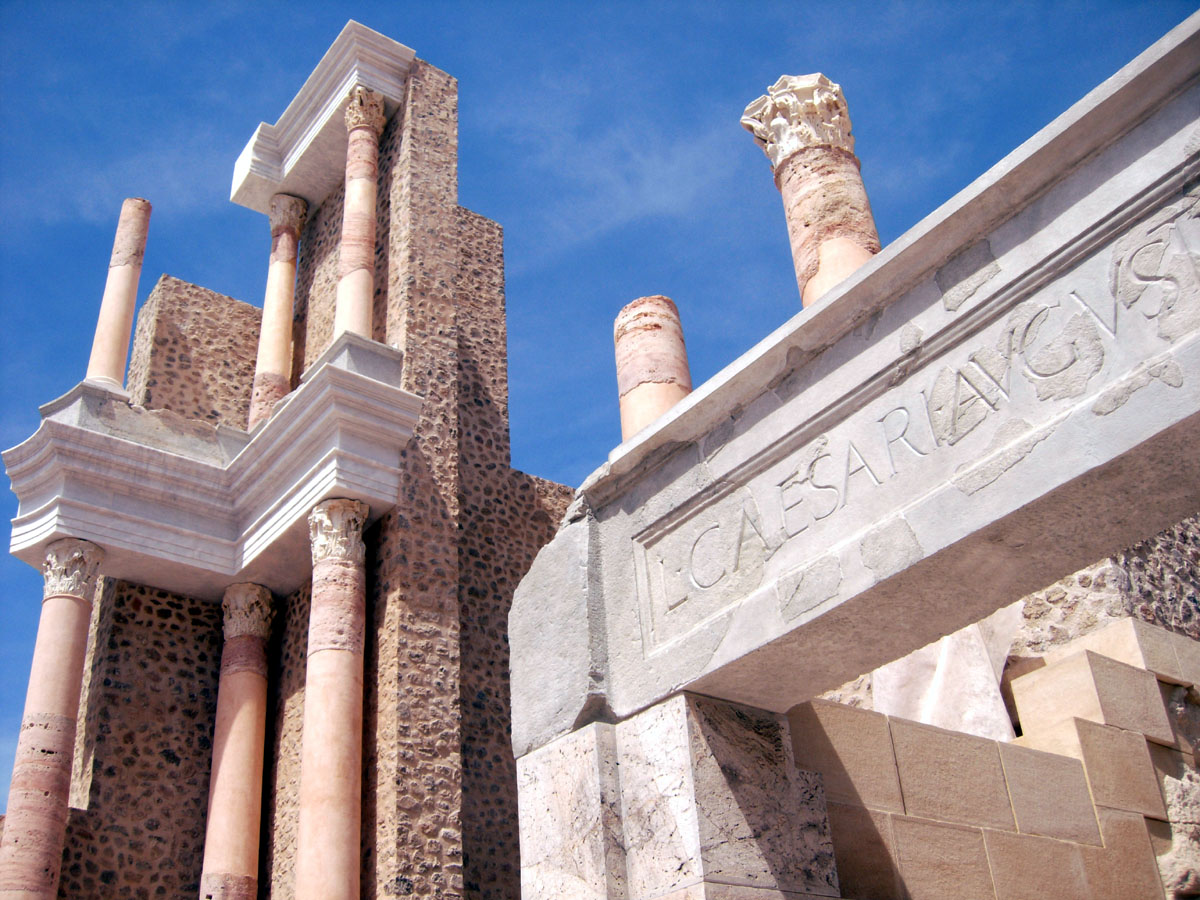
The Roman Theatre in Cartegena, currently undergoing reconstruction

The city was founded around the year 227 BC by the Carthaginian general Hasdrubal the Fair under the name of Qart Hadast ("New Town"). It was strategically located on a large natural harbor from which the nearby silver mines of Carthago Nova could be controlled. It was taken by the Roman general Scipio Africanus in the year 209 BC during the Second Punic War to cut off the silver going to general Hannibal.

In the year 44 BC, the city received the title of colony under the name Colonia Urbs Iulia Nova Carthago (CVINC), founded by citizens of Roman law. In 27 BC, Augustus decided to reorganize Hispania, and the city was included in the new imperial province of Hispania Tarraconensis, through Tiberius and Claudius, it was made the capital of conventus iuridicus Carthaginensis.

During the reign of Augustus, the city was subjected to an ambitious development program which included, among other urban developments, the construction of an impressive Roman theater, the Augusteum (imperial cult building) and a forum.

Later, under Emperor Diocletian, it was made the capital of the Roman Province of Hispania Carthaginensis, separate from Tarraconensis.

== Military projects ==
The military works were the first type of infrastructure built by the Romans in Hispania, due to the confrontation with the Carthaginians on the peninsula during the Second Punic War.

=== Camps ===
Roman forts were the main focus of military strategy, passive or active. They could be constructed for short term temporary occupation, tasked with some immediate military purpose, or as a winter garrison for troops. In these cases they were built with mortar and wood. They could also be permanent, in order to subdue or control an area in the long term, often built in stone. Many camps became stable population centers, eventually becoming real cities, as is the case of León.

=== Walls ===
Once a settlement had developed into a stable colony or camp, it had to be defended with sturdy walls. The Romans inherited the poliorcetic tradition (siege warfare tactics) of the Greeks, and over the 2nd and 1st centuries BC, erected substantial walls, usually using double facing stones with a filling inside of mortar, stone and unique Roman concrete. The walls could be from four to even ten meters thick (13 to 30 feet). After the period of the Pax Romana these defenses were expendable, but the invasions of Germanic tribes revived the construction of walls.

There are notable present-day remains of Roman walls in Zaragoza, Lugo, León, Tarragona, Astorga, Córdoba, Segóbriga and Barcelona.

== Civil projects ==
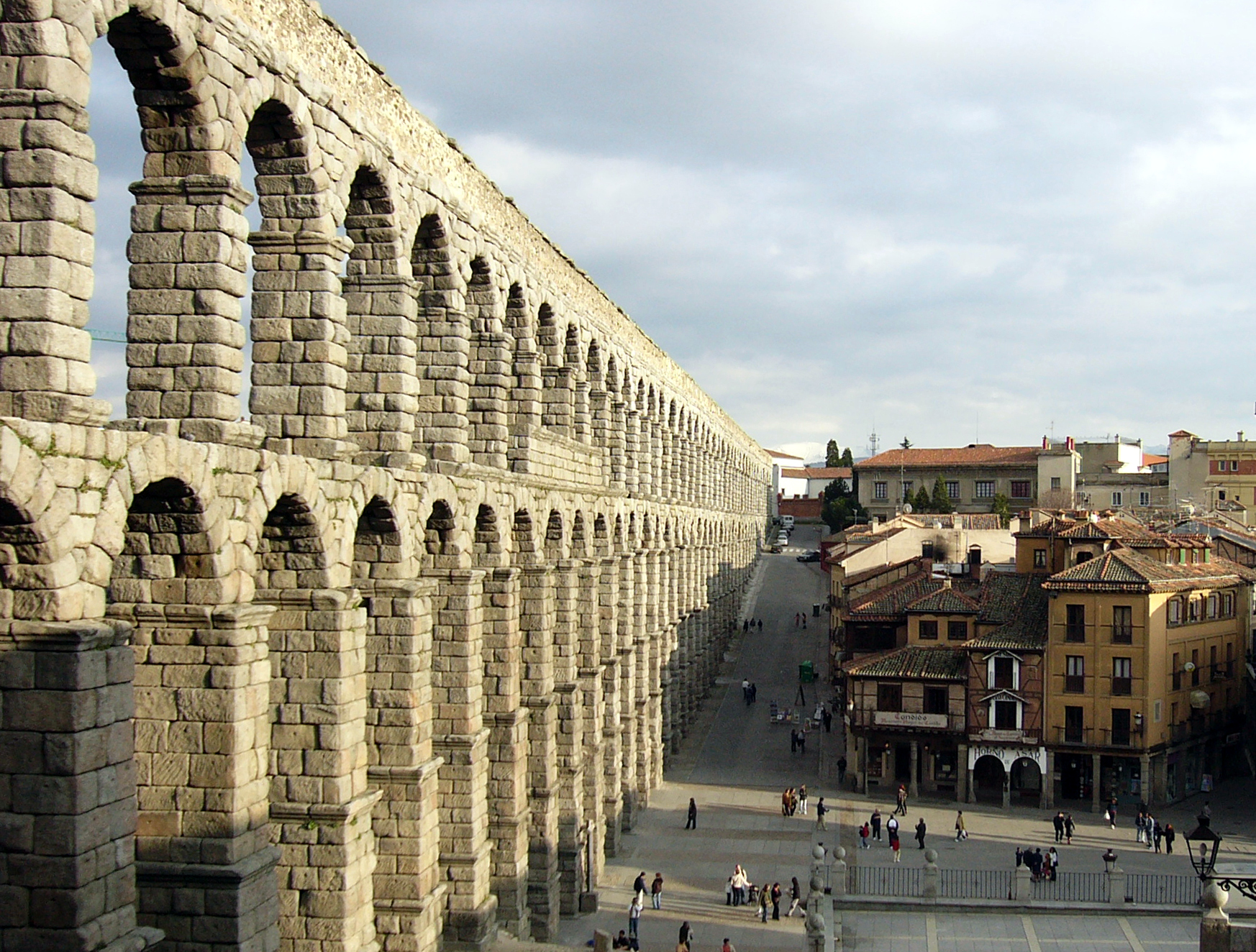
Aqueduct of Segovia: one of the most extensive surviving civil works from Roman Hispania

The ancient Roman civilization is known as the great builder of infrastructure. It was the first civilization which dedicated itself to a serious and determined effort for this kind of civil work as a basis for settlement of their populations, and the preservation of its military and economic domination over the vast territory of its empire. The works of most importance are roads, bridges and aqueducts.

=== Infrastructure ===
Either within or outside the urban environment, these facilities became vital for the function of the city and its economy, allowing it to supply the most essential necessities; either water via aqueducts or food, supplies and goods through the efficient network of roads. In addition, any city of at least average importance had a sewer system for the drainage of waste water and to prevent rain flooding the streets.

==== Roman streets and roads ====
Infrastructure for civilian use was built with intensity by the Romans in Hispania, Roman roads that ran through the peninsula joining Cádiz to the Pyrenees and Asturias to Murcia: covering the coastal Mediterranean and Atlantic through the already established routes. Along them a booming trade flowed, encouraging political stability of the territory over several centuries.

Among these roads, the most important were:

- Vía Lata, now known as Vía de la Plata; or the Silver Way
- Via Augusta, the longest Imperial Roman road in Spain. 1500 km in length and comprising multiple sections
- Vía Exterior

Main arterial roads of Roman Hispania.

To signal distance along these routes milestones were placed, which were either columns or significant stones, and they marked the distance from the point of origin as measured by thousands of steps (miles).

Many of these routes correspond to the layout of present-day roads or highways in Spain and Portugal.

==== Bridges ====
Roman bridges, an essential complement to the roads, allowed them to overcome the obstacle posed by rivers, which in the case of the Iberian Peninsula can be very wide. Rome, faced with this geographical challenge, responded with some of the most durable and reliable constructions. Rome also built a large number of wooden bridges on minor crossings, but today the only surviving references are those made of stone.

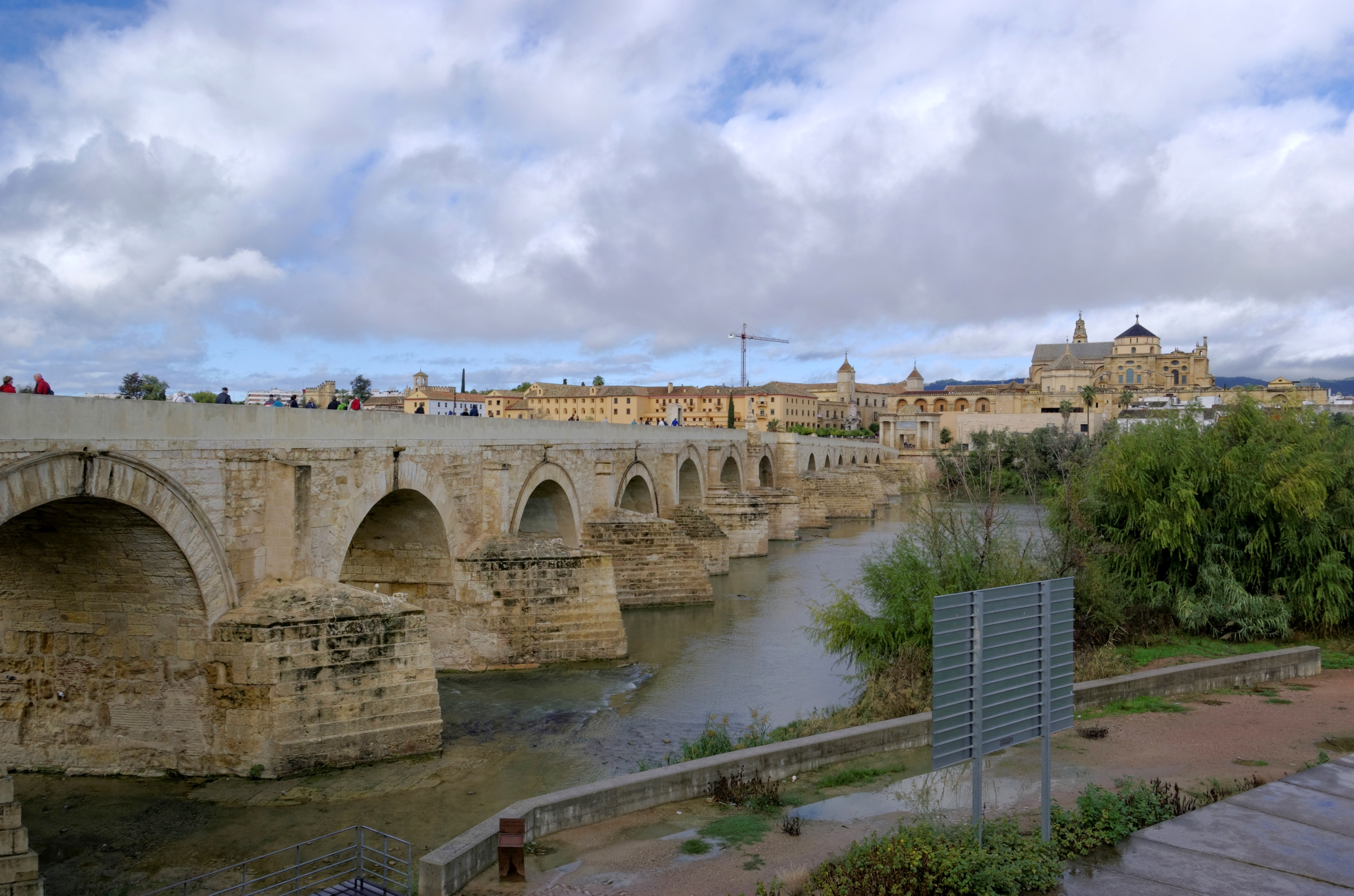
Roman bridge at Cordoba

The typical Roman bridge consisted of a platform supported by arches, semicircles or segments of circles. There are also cases of bridges over full circles. The pillars in the water include a wedge-shaped structures called abutments to redirect the flow of water, which create a pier on which the bridge itself sits.

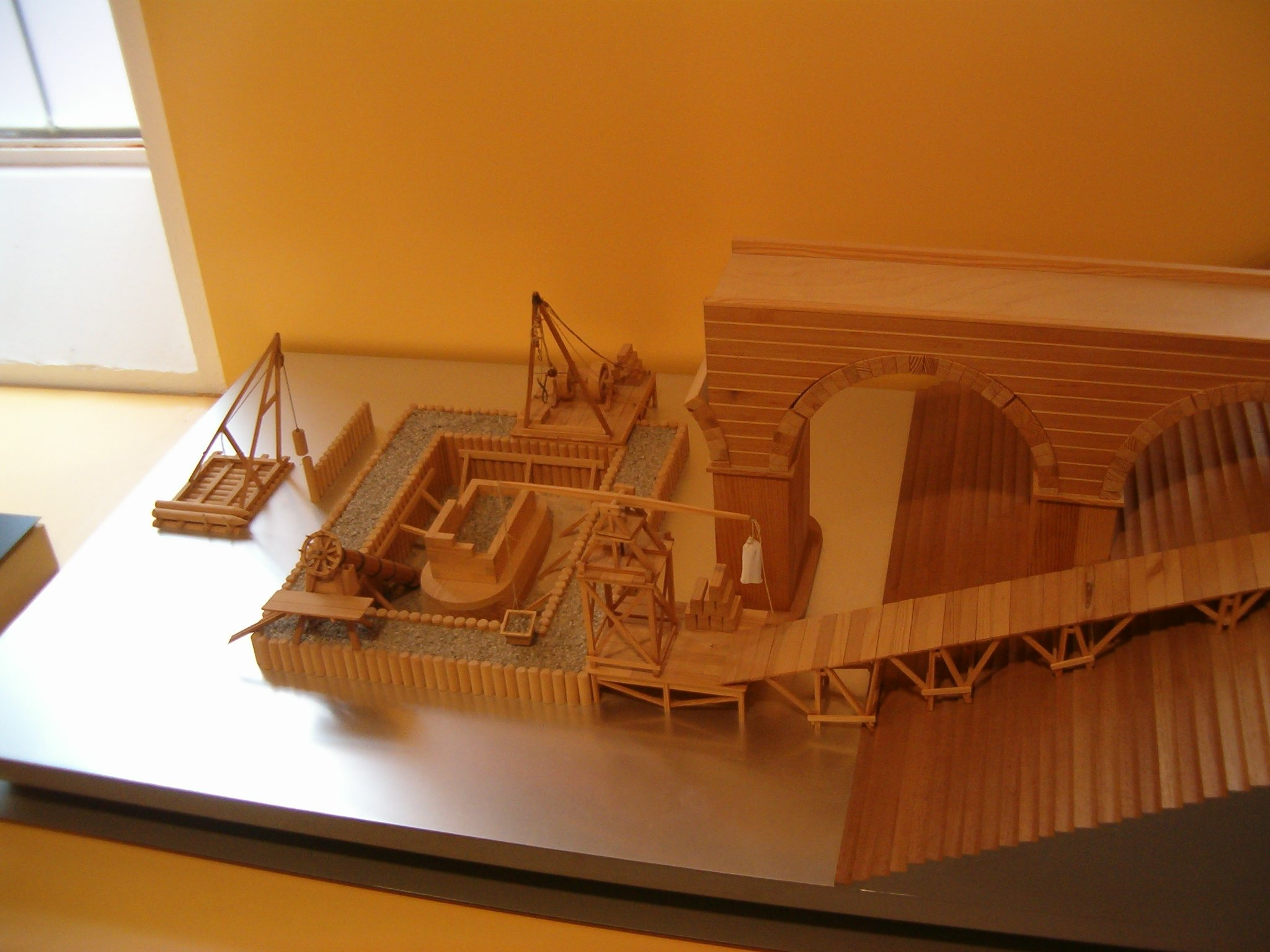
Model of the construction of a Roman abutment

This successful model construction model lasted until late Middle Ages, and today it is difficult to know in some cases if some bridges are actually Roman or if they were built later to the original design.

==== Aqueducts ====
An important town needed a constant water supply for the thousands of people gathered in one place which could be sometimes several miles away from natural water source. To achieve this continuous flow of water the Romans built aqueducts.

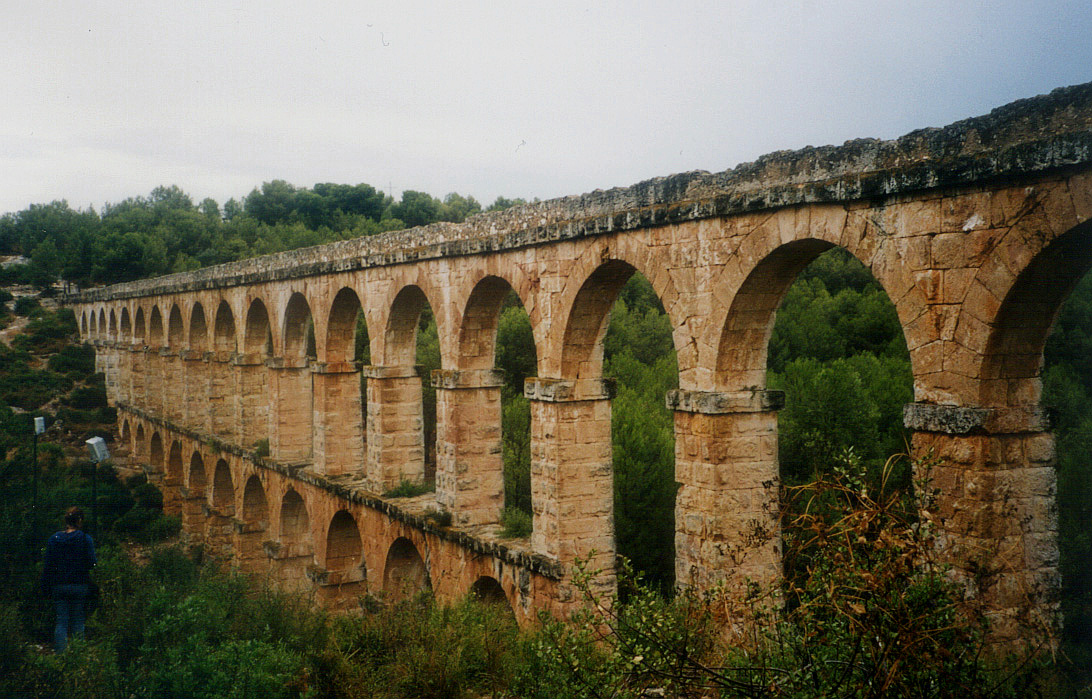
Aqüeducte de les Ferreres is located on the outskirts of the Roman town Tarraco.

The Roman aqueducts, despite their appearances, were built mostly underground. However, they are now known as the monumental aqueducts built to bridge geographic barriers in order to give a continuous water channel. The slenderness of this type of construction, along with the tremendous height reached by some of them, makes them the most beautiful works of civil engineering of all time, especially taking into account the difficulties overcome to build them.

For the construction of an aqueduct, first they needed a source of the water, channeling a natural flow through the construction of a canal, and allowing the slope to carry water through this channel to an artificial lake (in some cases a large stone reservoir structure). This ensured the constant supply of water throughout the year.

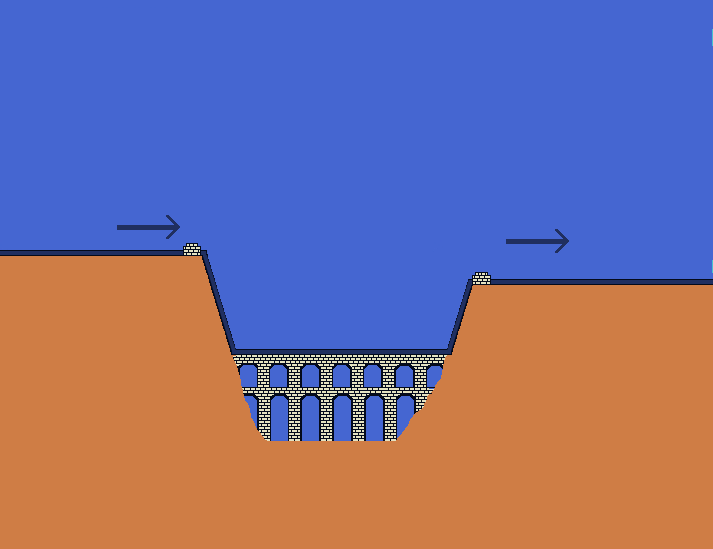
Diagram of a water trap

From this point, the water could be transported by canals, whether of stone, or by pipes of ceramic or lead. The latter solution would also bring about health problems such as lead poisoning, a problem that would extend almost to the present day in places where this type of water management has been used in abundance. Lead piping was more easy to work, but was used more in the urban distribution network due to its high price, as well as aqueduct traps.

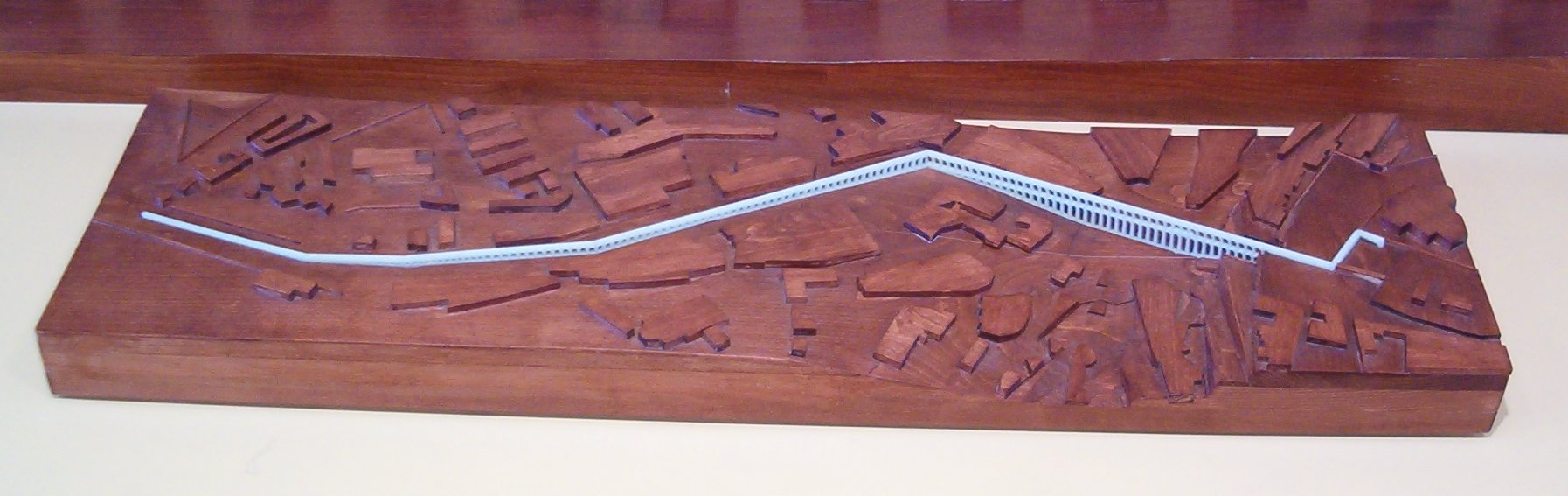
Model of the Aqueduct of Segovia

The artificial reservoir water was transported through an underground channel to the town, often taking advantage of natural slopes, but sometimes the Romans also built traps, which allowed them to avoid a downward slope without building the famous bridges but keeping the pressure flow. These traps take advantage of the pressure resulting from the falling water to raise the other side, keeping the pressure at the expense of losing some of the flow. This is an application of the principle of communicating vessels.

Current aqueducts which are notable for their condition include the first aqueduct of Segovia, which is the most famous Roman construction of the Iberian Peninsula, followed by the aqueduct in Tarragona or Devil's Bridge, and also the remains of the aqueduct of Mérida, known as the Miraculous Aqueduct.

=== Urban works ===
Within the urban environment are the baths and sewers, but also buildings for leisure and culture, such as theaters, circuses and amphitheaters.

==== Bathhouses ====
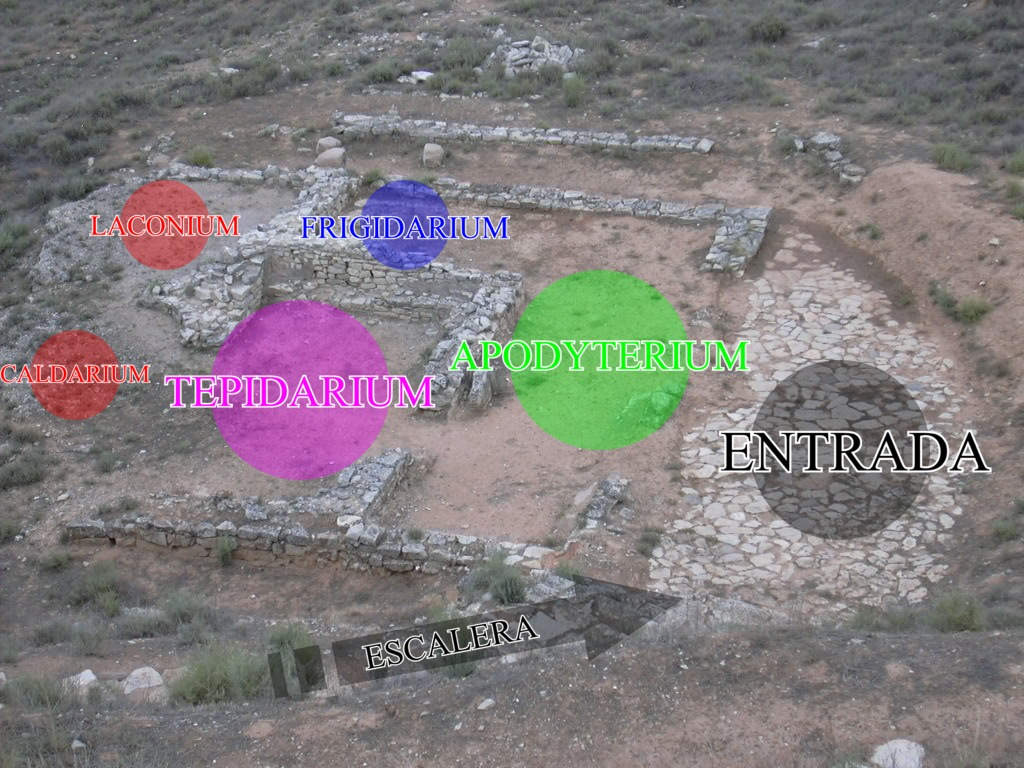
Diagram of a Roman bathhouse at Azaila.

Hot springs or public baths became meeting places for people from all walks of life, and their use was encouraged by the authorities, which sometimes covered their expenses which allowed free access to the population. Although men and women sometimes shared the same spaces, bath times were different for each: women came in the morning while the men did at dusk. Those available in separate sections for men and women, the separate areas devoted to them were given the name spas.

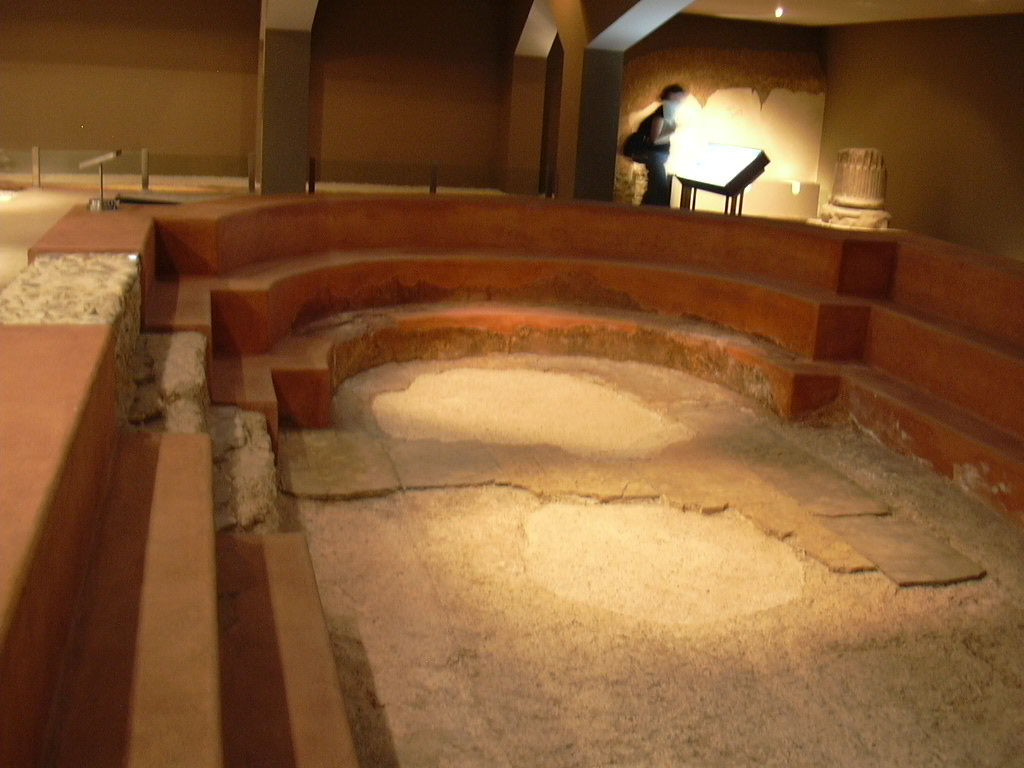
Pool at the baths in Caesaraugusta

In the Iberian Peninsula there is great diversity of such archaeological buildings, highlighting their conservation status such as the Baths of Alange near Mérida which, after several restorations over the 18th and 19th centuries, are now open the public as part of a medicinal water spa.

The Roman bath is a structure defined by its function, as shown in the schematic diagram of Azaila. The apodyterium was also the entrance to the baths, which also acted as a changing room. Then it led to another room called tepidarium which consisted of a warm room which in turn gave way to frigidarium or the caldarium rooms, hot and cold water rooms, respectively. Under the floor of this room was a series of pipes through which hot water circulated, or in smaller bathhouses they used a more residential style of hypocaust heating. The frigidarium, however, used to be an open pool of cool water.

Generally, the spa is surrounded by gardens and other accessory buildings with services for visitors such as gymnasiums, libraries or other places of assembly (laconium), all with the aim of providing customers with a pleasant and invigorating environment. These springs require large numbers of staff to operate, particularly taking into account the need for large amounts of hot water, the need for materials and to properly serve customers.

==== Sewers ====
The Romans knew from their earliest days that a city must have an efficient system of waste disposal. Hence, they built in all cities of any importance the sewage systems that still in some cases remain in their original form. In Mérida, for example, the Roman sewer system has been used until recent years, and its design still serves as reference to know what was the layout of the ancient Roman city. In other cities like León (founded as a camp of the Legio VII Gemina) are vestiges of these infrastructures and serve as an example on rainy days of a perfect drainage system to prevent flooded streets .

==== Theatres ====
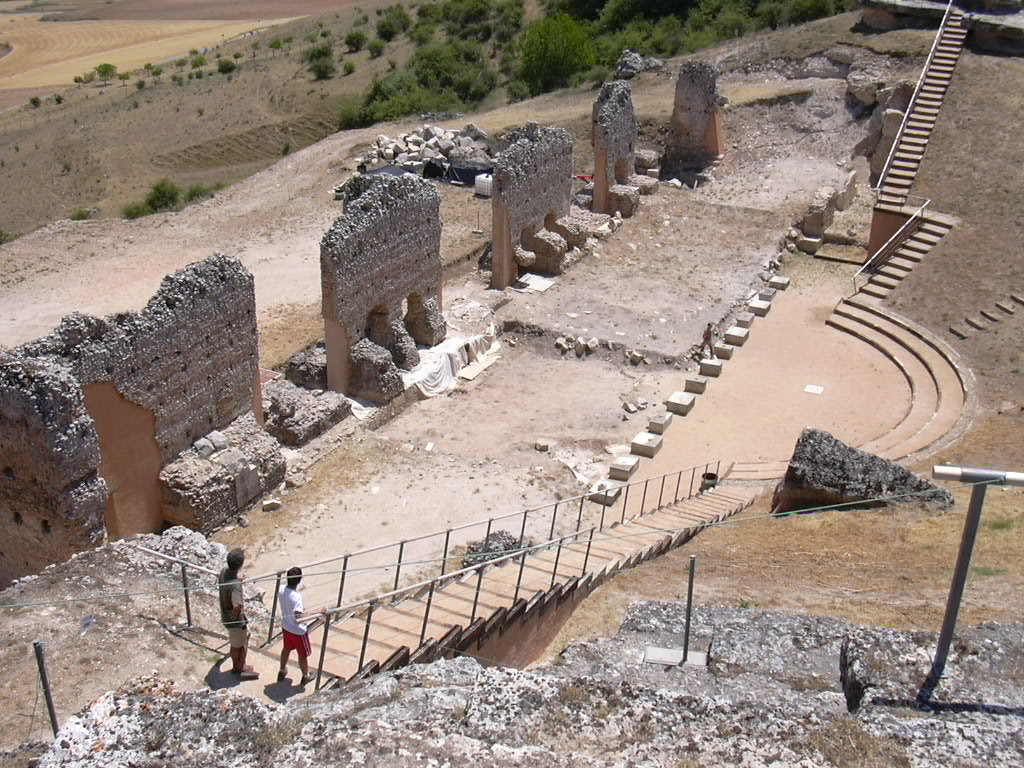
Clunia Theatre.

The theater was one of the favorite leisure activities of the Hispanic-Roman, and as with other buildings of public interest, any city of renown could do without owning one. So much so that the theater of Emerita Augusta was built almost at the same time as the rest of the city by the consul Marcus Agrippa, son in law of the emperor Octavian Augustus. In total there are known remains of at least thirteen Roman theaters throughout the peninsula.

The Roman theatre had more important activities than comedies or dramas; it was a venue for celebrations that praised the emperor, it is therefore of a more political, not leisurely nature, although on occasion it may have accommodated all kinds of cultural exhibitions. The vast wealth of theaters in Hispania has to do with the political life of cities and towns which all aspired to have its own theater and therefore solidify their status.

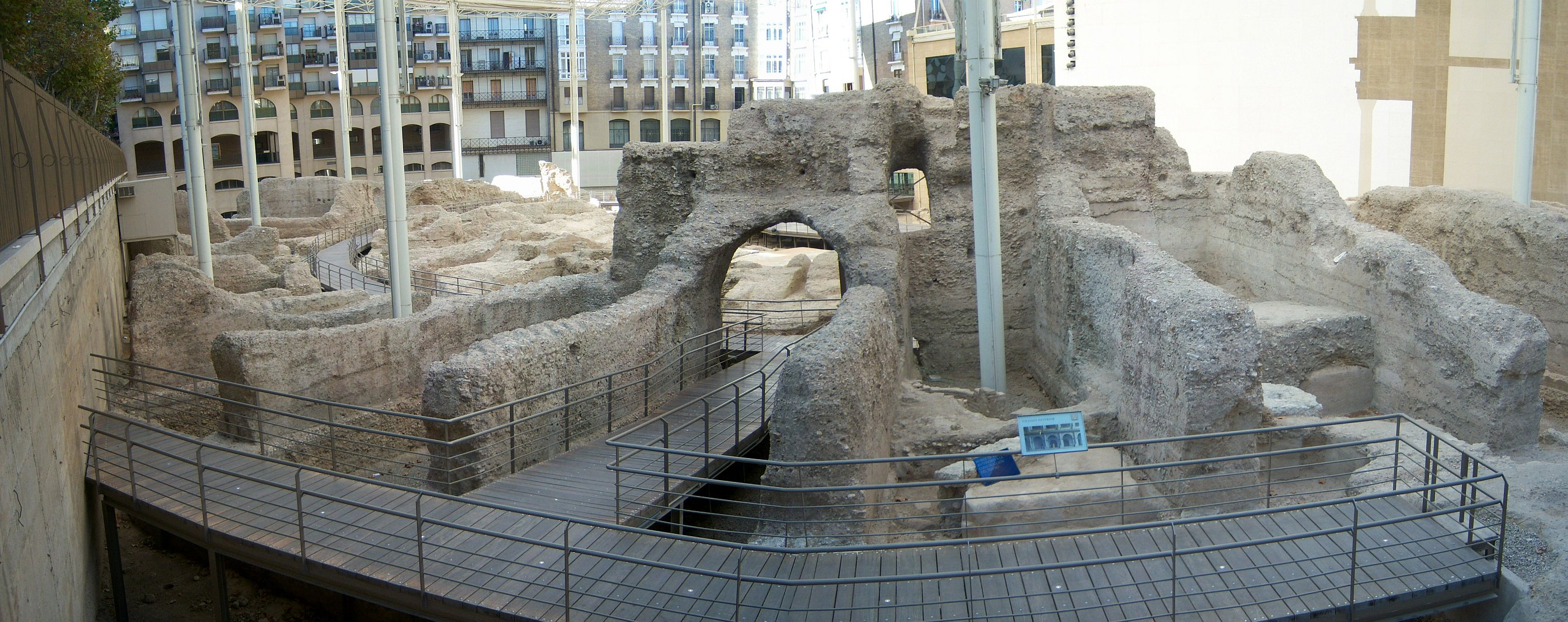
Remains of the Roman theatre at Cesaraugusta, in modern-day Zaragoza

Other examples are in the city of Baelo Claudia, a city that has an impressive Roman theatre inside the fortress, occupying a huge space. Its construction in a city where only houses have been found within the fortress suggests the importance of this civil building: to represent the political force of the emperor.

Undoubtedly, the best preserved theater in the Peninsula is to Mérida, but also the theater of Italica, Sagunto, Clunia, Caesaraugusta and others are part of the archaeological record, and some even host modern theater festivals regularly: they can be considered to be fulfilling the purpose for which they were built, in some cases more than two thousand years ago.

In the 1990s, the Roman theatre in Cartagena was discovered and is being restored.

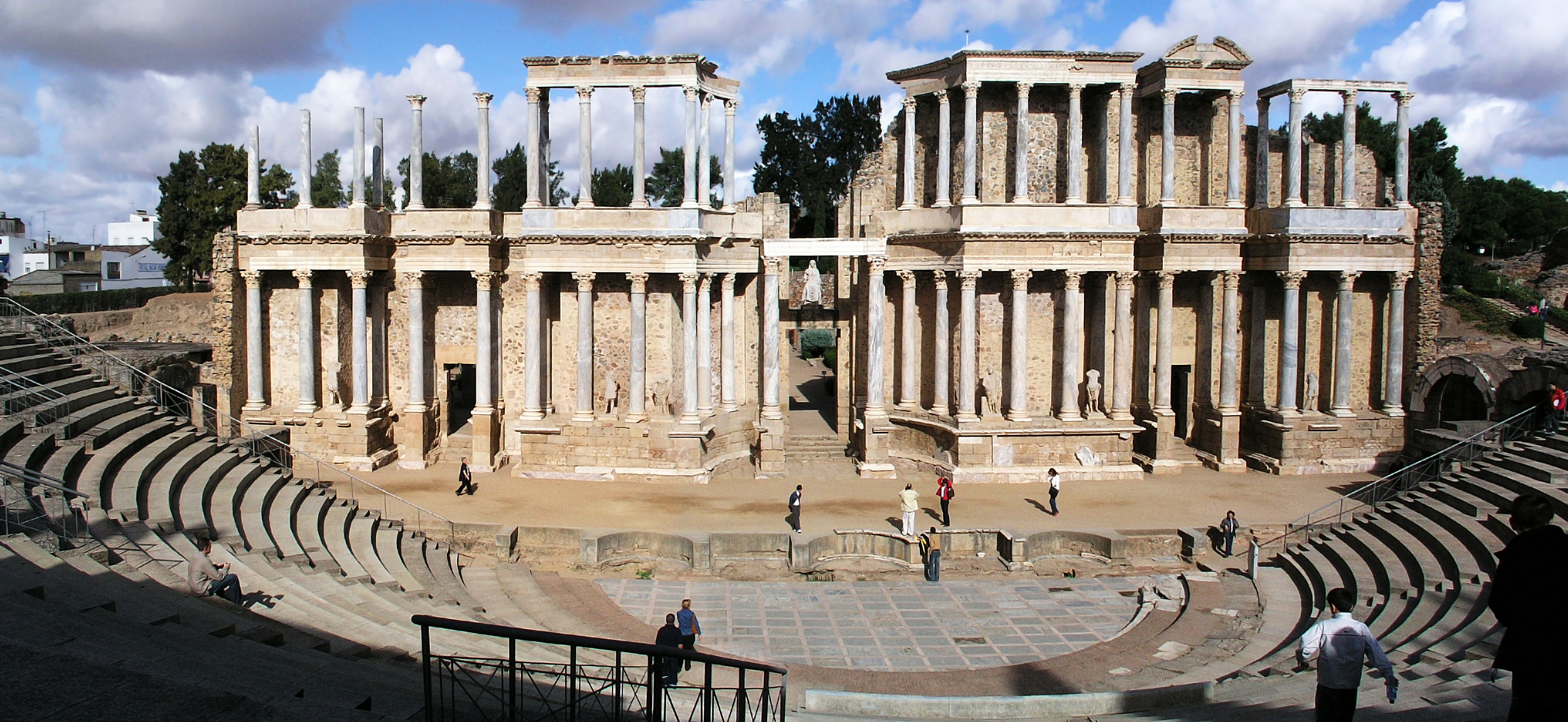
Roman theatre in Mérida

The reconstruction carried out on Sagunto's theater, designed by architects Giorgio Grassi and Manuel Portaceli and carried out between 1983 and 1993 was mired in both controversy and in legal disputes.

==== Amphitheatres ====
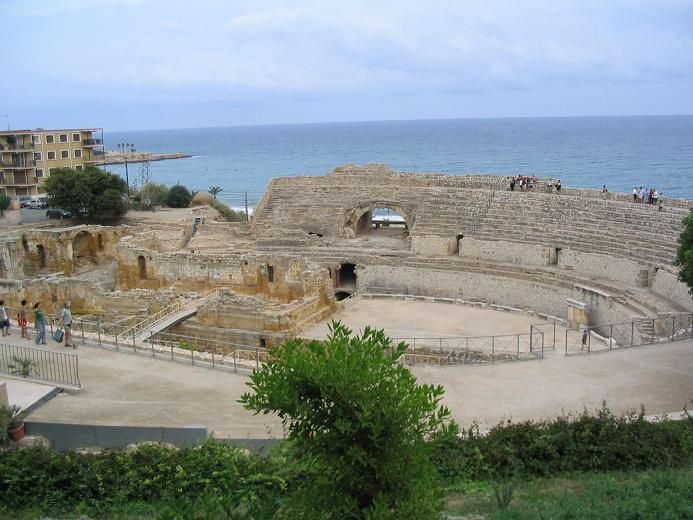
The amphitheatre at Tarragona.

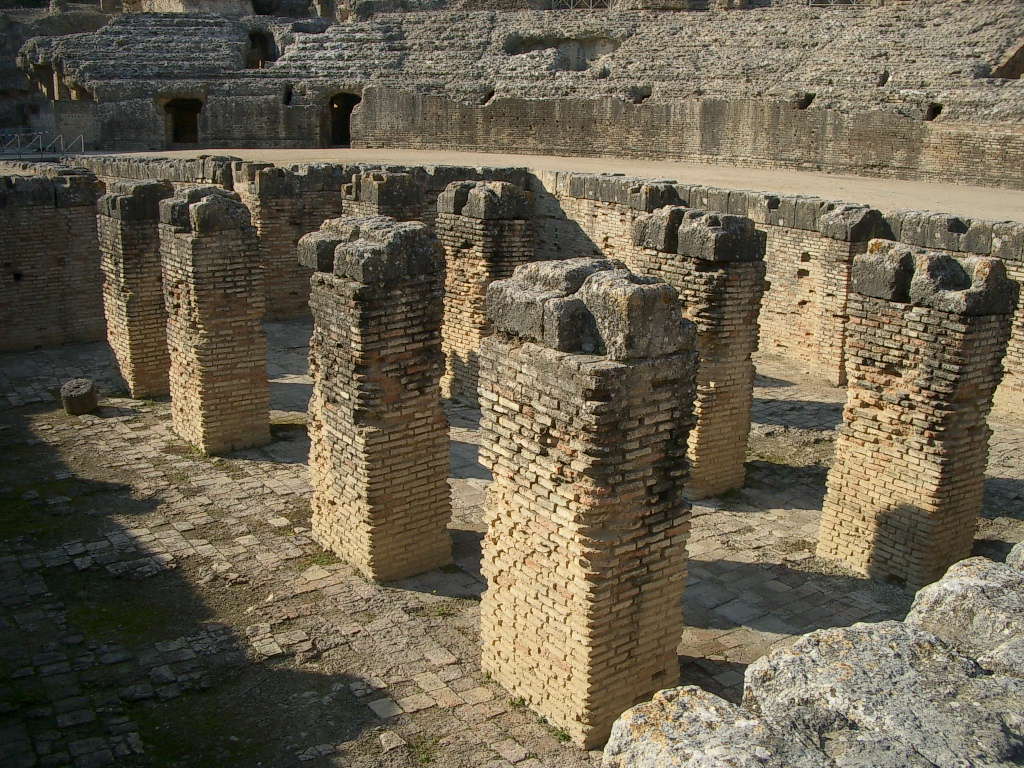
The amphitheatre at Itálica.

Entertainment in the form of gladiatorial combat took place at first in the circus, but then the construction of amphitheatres began: elliptical buildings exclusively for gladiatorial combat. The first stone amphitheater was built in Rome, and the same design was later exported to major cities throughout the empire. Within Hispania, several were built whose remains have been preserved, such as Italica, Jerez, Tarragona and Mérida.

== Overview ==
Roman influence gradually spread across the peninsula over a prolonged period of two centuries. Many Iberian tribes were initially aggressive, opposing Roman dominion militarily, though others became allied or tributary entities increasingly reliant on Rome.

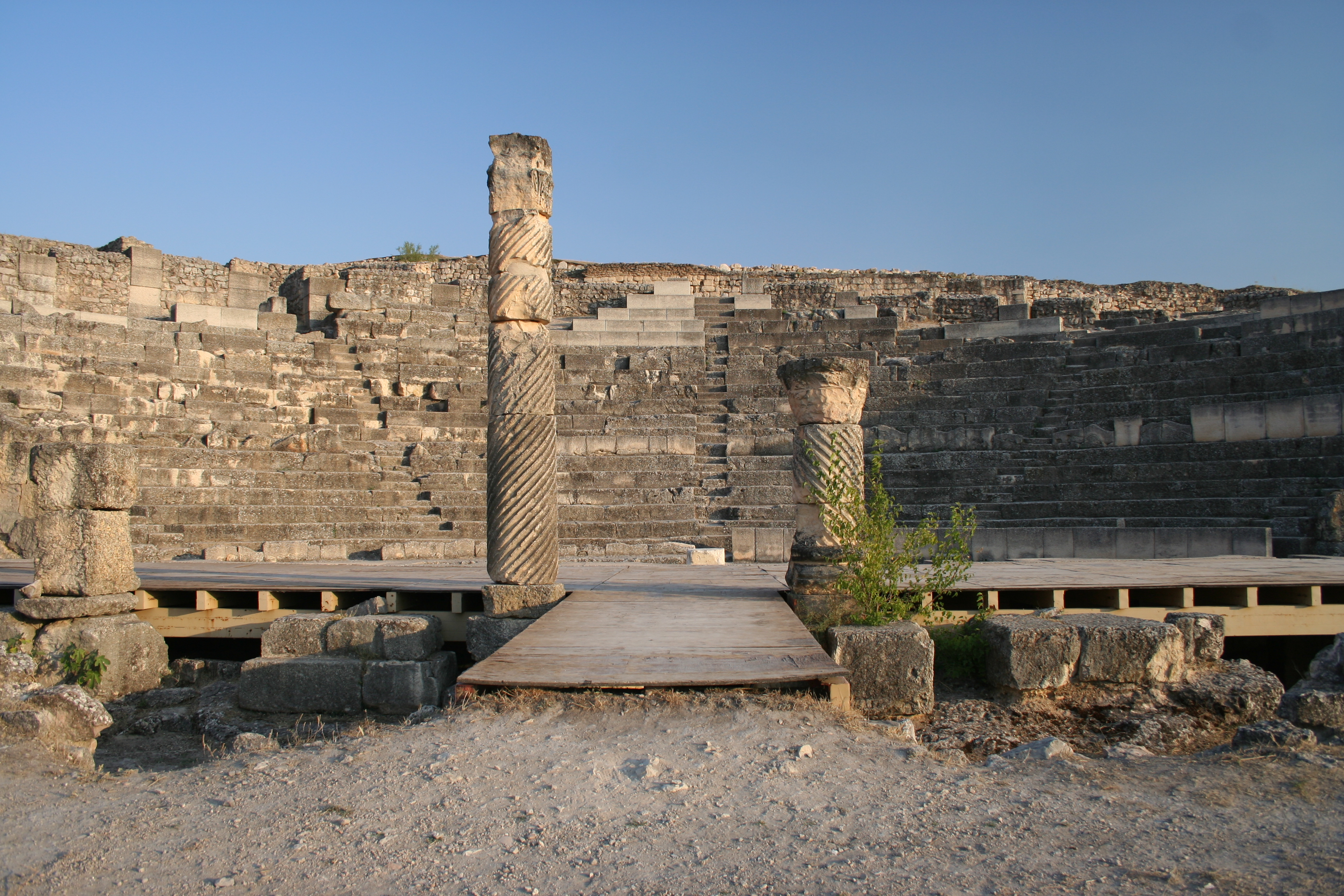
Roman theatre at Segóbriga.

The Mediterranean coast, which was inhabited before the arrival of the Romans by indigenous Iberians such as the Turdetani and Ilergetians, as well as Greek and Phoenician/Carthaginian colonies, were quick to adopt aspects of Roman culture. The first Roman cities were founded in these territories, such as Tarraco in the northeast or Italica in the south during the period of confrontation with Carthage.

In the interior of the Iberian Peninsula, where Celtiberian, Cantabrian and Vasconian (Basque) cultures were well established, constant military campaigns against the rebellious indigenous Iberians eventually pacified the Hispanic provinces, ending with the Augustan campaigns against the Cantabrians and Astures. The predominance of native Iberian culture diminished in the face of the cultural impact of Roman dominion, being assimilated and transformed gradually into the later Hispano-Roman culture.

The new Hispano-Roman elite, formed of the preceding Iberian tribal elite and the growing Roman aristocracy, occupied administrative positions in the new municipal institutions and wider imperial bureaucracy, serving in judicial, military and civil offices. The expansion of Roman citizenship in the Antonine Constitution in 212 AD radically changed the concept of romanitas and aided in the further assimilation of native Iberian cultures.

Three Roman emperors, Trajan, Hadrian and Theodosius I, came from the Roman province of Hispania, as did the authors Quintilian, Martialis, Lucan and Seneca.

== See also ==
- Lex Irnitana
- National Archaeology Museum (Portugal)
- Roman conquest of Hispania
- Roman Empire
