= Publius Carisius =

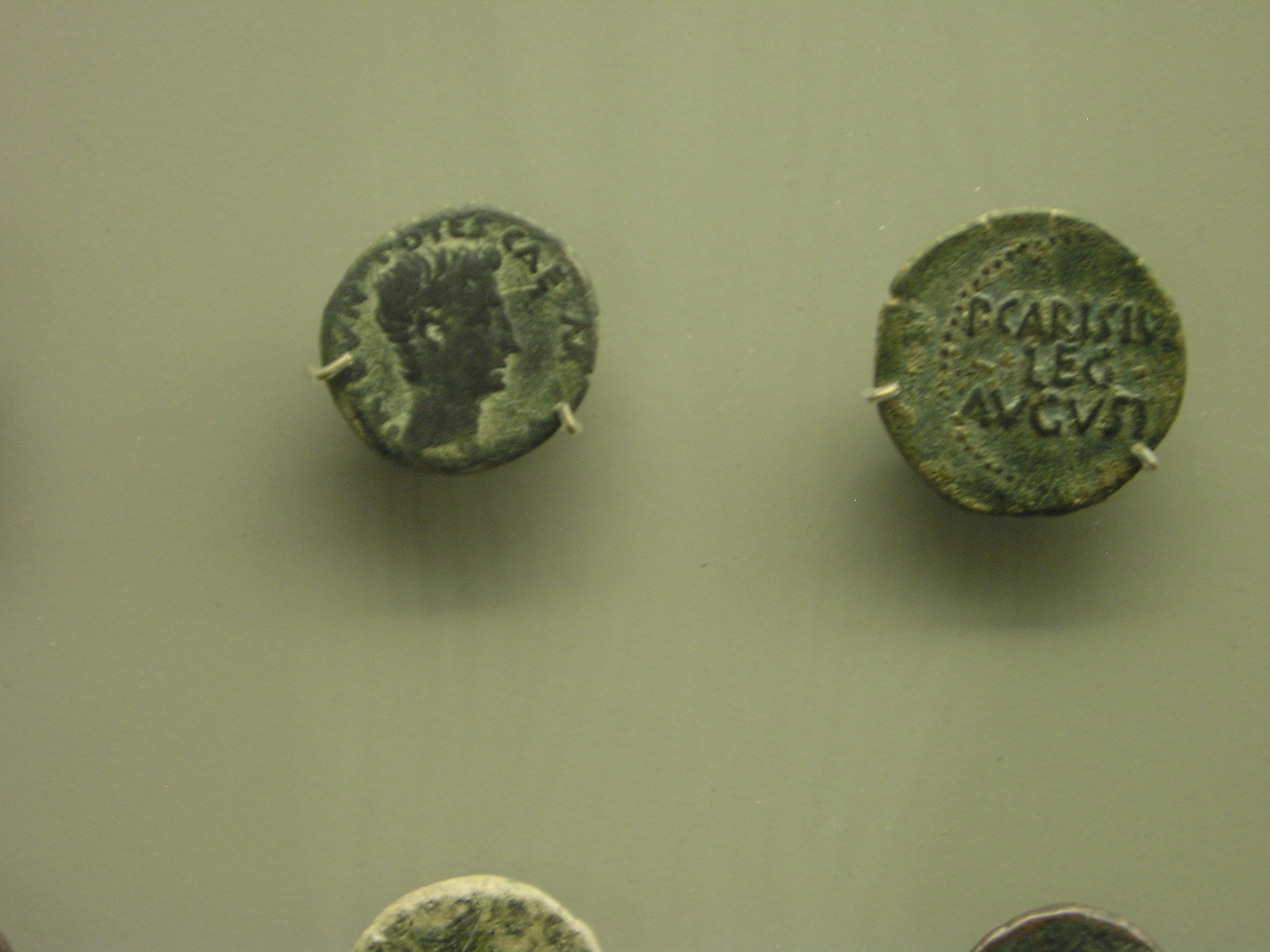
Currency issued by Publius Carisius during the Cantabrian wars to pay the troops with fiat currency.

Publius Carisius was a Roman legatus of emperor Augustus in Lusitania. He took part in the Cantabrian Wars against the Astures.

== Life ==
He was the son of Titus Carisius. He earned the trust of Augustus in the civil wars, when he named him legatus of Lusitania. He exerts this position between the year 26 BC and 22 BC.

His intervention in the Cantabrian wars was decisive for the defeat of the Asturians in Lancia and for the later conquest of Asturias transmontana. Commanding an army made up of three legions - the Legio V Alaudae, the Legio VI Victrix and the Legio X Gemina - and an undetermined number of auxiliary units, thanks to the treachery of the brigaecinos, he was able to repel the surprise attack that the Asturians planned against the legions camped next to the Esla and then launch a counterattack against the Asturian city of Lancia (Villasabariego).

In the conquest of the Asturias transmontana (present-day Asturias), his legions opened an entry way through the mountains of the Cantabrian mountain range that still retains its name: the Via de la Carisa. Along this road, the remains of the Roman camp have been found, on Mount Curriechos, which housed his troops.

He finished the wars against Cantabrians and Asturians in the year 25 BC and founded the city of Emerita Augusta (Mérida) with the veterans of the V Alaudae and X Gemina legions.

During his tenure he minted silver denarii with the effigy of Augustus on the obverse and his name and position —P. CARISIVS LEG AVGVSTI— on the reverse; He also minted two series of bronze aces in a traveling workshop and in Lucus Augusti (Lugo) with the bust of Augustus on the obverse and the caetra or round indigenous shield on the reverse.

Despite his victories, he had to face an uprising of the Asturians in the year 22 BC in which he was assisted by Gaius Furnius (consul), legatus of the Tarraconense, and which caused his dismissal.

Dio Cassius attributes this uprising to a severe and cruel behavior on the part of Carisius with the Asturians; However, Carisius was also able to win the sympathy of the indigenous peoples in managing it, as evidenced by the trust shown by the brigaecinos and the fact that his name was taken by some of them.

== See also ==
- Conquest of Hispania
- Romanization of Hispania

== Bibliography ==
- Jorge Camino, Yolanda Viniegra and Rogelio Estrada (2005): La Carisa: Asturians and Romans Face to Face, ISBN 84-7925-287-1.
- Edmund Groag, "Carisius 1)", RE, Stuttgart 1899, vol. III-2, col. 1592.
