= Gausón =

Gausón was a semi-legendary Astur general who fought the Romans in the Astur-Cantabrian Wars (29 BC–19 BC).

Little is known about Gausón due to the lack of classical sources, but historical codexes, oral tradition and other several sources do mention his presence in the Cantabrian Wars as a military leader of the Astur armies who attacked the Roman legions near the town of Lancia during the Bellum Asturicum campaign.

== Historical sources ==
The Gran Enciclopedia Asturiana (Great Asturian Encyclopedia (in Spanish)) says:

Some leaders are mentioned to have fought during the independence wars against the Romans: Viriathus in Lusitania, and Corocotta in Cantabria. There are little references to the Astur leader, Gausón. He is mentioned by some ancient historians like Dio Cassius, Florus, Livius, Licinianus, Plinius and Ptolomeus, but they give very little information about [t]his figure. It is known that he took an active part as Astur leader in the wars of 29 BC and 27 BC; he survived the campaign of 26 BC. Orosius says that while the Cantabri were rising, Gausón was captured in ambush and crucified as a warning to the Astur people. Other scholars affirm he also took active part on the defense of Lancia and that he died in the siege. There is no doubt about his existence since an ancient Latin mural inscription is found, stating: O nobiles et supervi astures, quos romani vincere vix potuere, liset Gauson superato ("Oh noble and proud Astur people, to whom Romans barely defeated, even once Gausón fell"). It is said that the Romans themselves built a little obelisk in Tarragona dedicated to the impetus of the Astur race, with this inscription: Genio Conventus Asturiencis. About the origins of Gausón, some state he was born near the Peñas Cape in Gozón (a phonetic toponym that would mean: Castle of Gauzón); others say he was born in the mountains of Proaza, where there is a place called Gaucín where a castle was built. Plinius affirms he was Astur Transmontani.

— Great Asturian Encyclopedia: "Gausón"

However, the most part of the above references to Gausón seem to be sourced in the chronicle of the relevant historian priest Luis Alfonso de Carvallo (1571–1635), which was based on previous ecclesiastical and historical codexes and works, some of them now lost:

When the troops were gathered on the east riverside, they had a council to decide how they would defeat the Romans and stop their advance. As they were informed that the Romans where trying to break in Asturias by three separate Legions, the Astures decided to divide their own troops in other identical three divisions and send each one of them to clash with each of the Roman legions in the narrow passes of the valleys where they were trying to enter Asturias, and to stop their advance to the interior of the country

— Luis Alfonso de Carvallo: "Historia de las Antigüedades y cosas memorables del Principado de Asturias. (History of the Antiquity and memorable things of the Principality of Asturias)". 1613. Part I. Chapter IV

This chronicle thus agrees with the Florian official Roman chronicle :

The Astures, at that time, descended with a great army from their snow-covered mountains. And those barbarians weren't acting blindly when they started the attack. They established a camp near the Astura river, divided their army into three legions and they were getting them ready for attacking the three Roman camps simultaneously. And it would have been an uncertain and cruel battle (as the attack was going to be so impetuous and intelligent, so violent and with so many casualties for both armies) if the Brigaecini wouldn't have betrayed them by informing Carisius, who came with his army. It was considered a great success to have those plans stopped, even when the battle was so cruel.

— Florus, "Epitome of Roman Wars. XXXIII: Bellum Cantabricum et Asturicum."

In a similar way, Luis Alfonso de Carvallo continues:

One of those three divisions, commanded by a captain called Liranto, or Loranto, went to the Cangas de Onís and Valle of Renazo area, and other of the three divisions went to Cangas de Tineo commanded by the captain called Astur (...). The third division commanded by the powerful captain Gausón stayed on the riverside to await the enemy General arrival, who was going to attack the town of Lancia, and he stood in the river ford where the Romans would have to pass. Lucius Florus and Orosius do a particular mention of this division of the armies in thirds, but I only found the name of the three captains in a clause of the codex the Master Guardian brought from Lotario, an old volume that he had in his library and for the curious I am reproducing the text here: Astures vero, quoniam tres Legatos, videlicét Carisium, Antistium, Firmium com Legionibus fuis in triamma divisos adventare audierant, rutotam Provinciam repente caperent; tribus aqué aminibus instrutis Vallimigressibus, in gentes bostium copias excipere moliti sunt, itaque ad Recarum Loranto; ad montes Ebraseos Assuromissis; fortissimus Dux Gauson a Lancia discedens ad flumen Asturum in fatis munitus efi; rundé paruis presidis propter angustias; flumixum (feuces?) Bostibus iter ad Lamceam ipedire, interclusis facile ladere poterat. For all the other facts, the codex is almost identical to Lucius Florus, Orosius and Sabelicus

— Luis Alfonso de Carvallo, "Historia de las Antigüedades y cosas memorables del Principado de Asturias. (History of the Antiquity and memorable things of the Principality of Asturias)". 1613. Part I. Chapter IV
