= Abiegos =

Abiegos is one of nine Parroquias in the municipality Ponga in the autonomous Region Asturia in Spain. The 34 residents (2007) live in a village close to the Nature Park Ponga. The administrative centre of the municipality San Juan de Beleño is 5.5 km away.

== Sights ==
- Hórreo de los Beyos
- Church „Iglesia de San Lorenzo“ in Abiegos
- Chapel „Capilla de San Antonio“
- Chapel „Capilla de la Merreguera“
- Hermitage „Ermita de Arcenorio“

== Villages and hamlets in Parroquia ==
- Abiegos - 34 residents 2007 43°11′41″N 5°11′8″W
