= Sobrefoz =

Coordinates: 43.171003°N 5.176332°W

Sobrefoz is one of nine parishes (administrative divisions) in Ponga, a municipality within the province and autonomous community of Asturias, in northern Spain. Its distance from Beleño is 5.50km and it lays at an altitude of 660m.

The population is 93 (INE 2007).

== Villages and hamlets ==
- Sobrefoz
- Ventaniella
