= Cazu =

Parish in Ponga, Asturias, Spain

Coordinates: 43.262293°N 5.211419°W

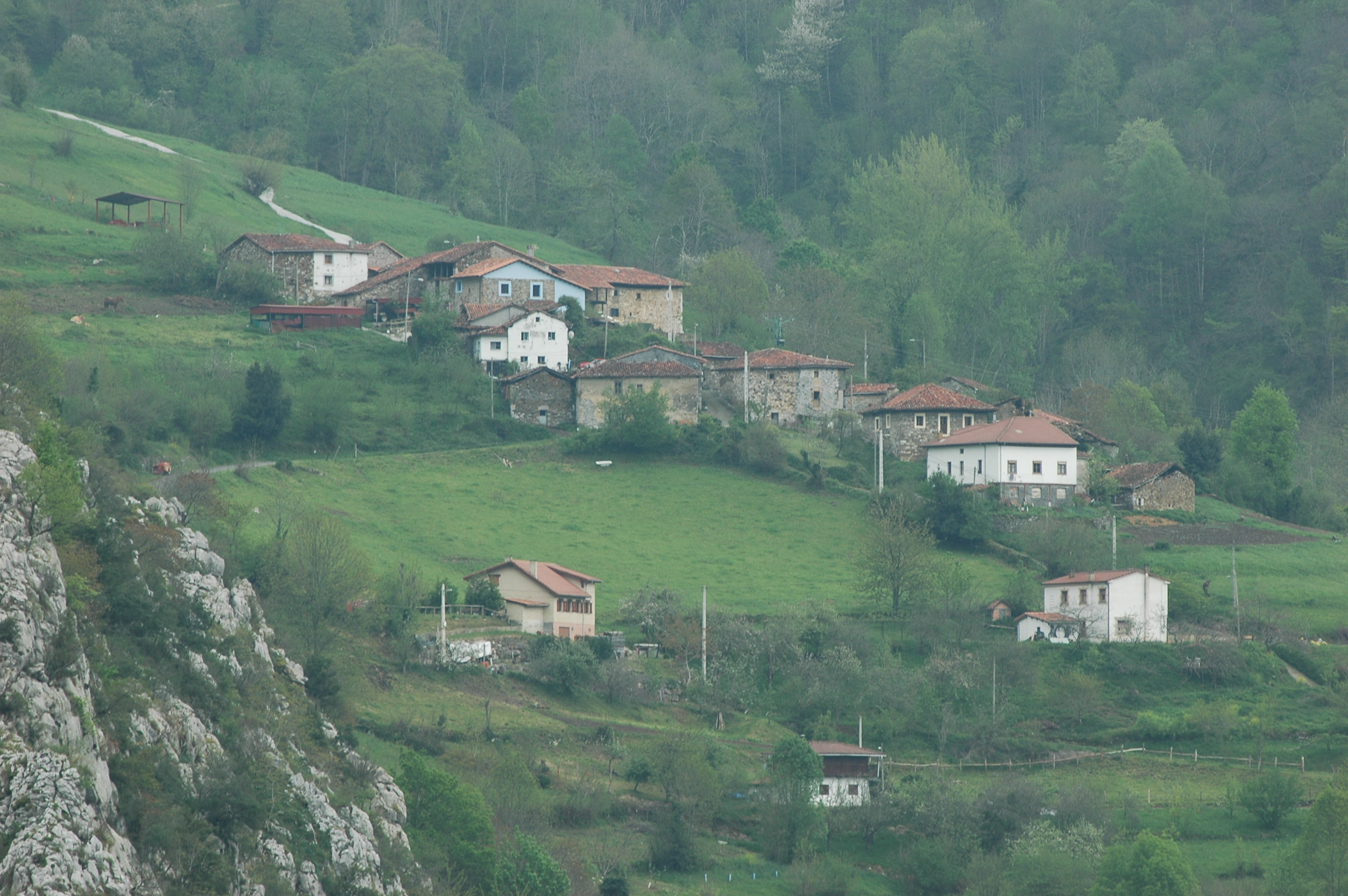
Cazu

Cazu is one of nine parishes (administrative divisions) in Ponga, a municipality within the province and autonomous community of Asturias, in northern Spain.

The population is 187 (INE 2007).

== Villages and hamlets ==
- Ambingue
- Cazu
- Los Lladeros
- Priesca
- Sellañu
- Tribiertu
