= Ponga, Asturias =

Ponga
- Municipality
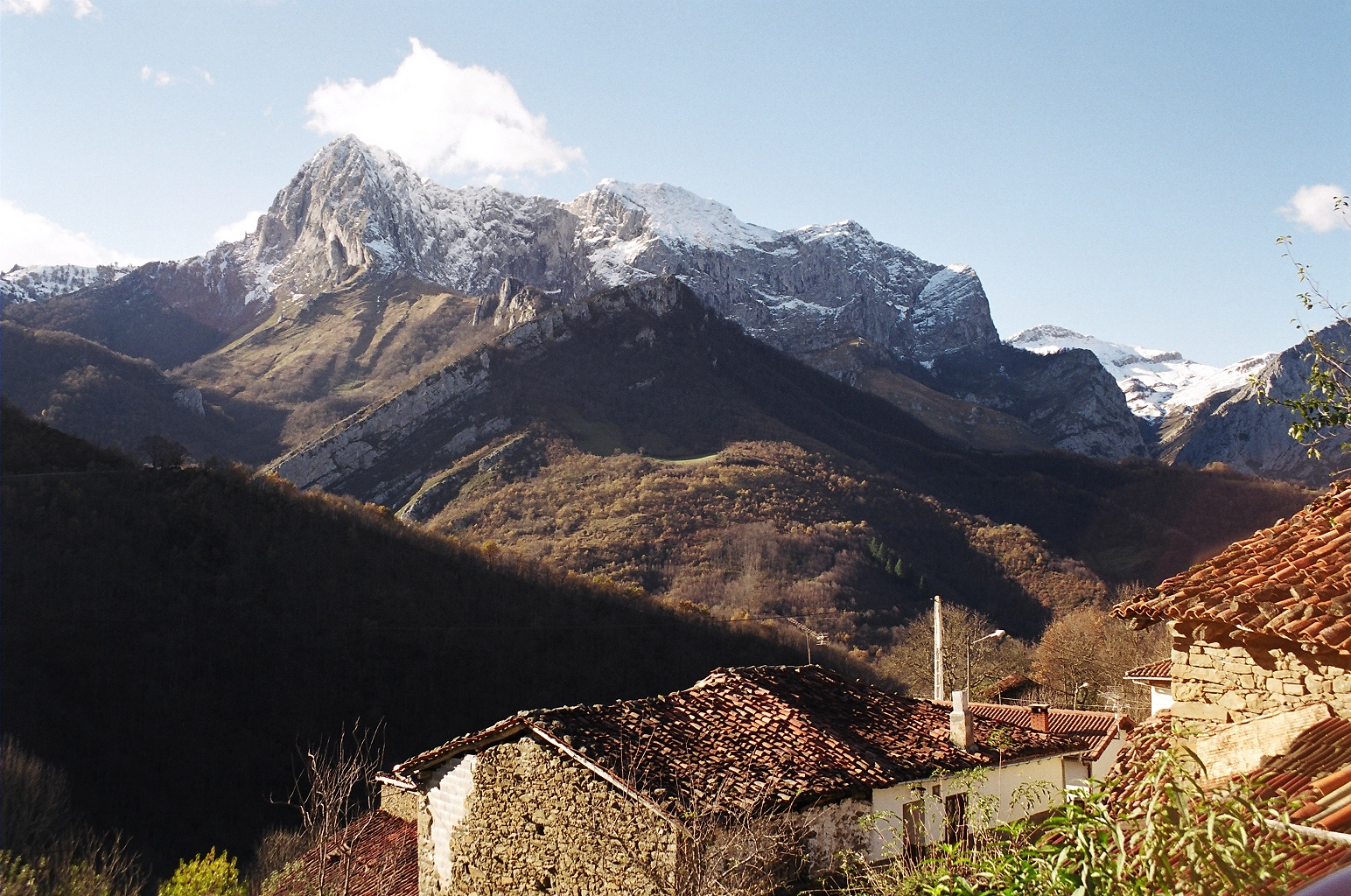

- Flag Coat of arms

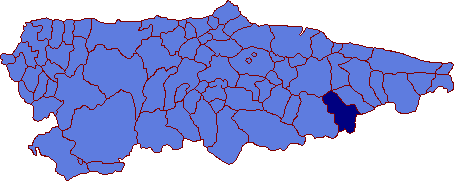

- Location in Spain
- Coordinates: 43°11′24″N 5°9′36″W
- Country: Spain
- Autonomous community: Asturias
- Province: Asturias
- Comarca: Oriente
- Judicial district: Cangas de Onís
- Capital: San Juan de Beleño

Government
  - Alcalde: Cándido Vega Díaz (Unión Asturianista)

Area
  - Total: 205.98 km^{2} (79.53 sq mi)
- Highest elevation: 2,142 m (7,028 ft)

Population (2025-01-01)
  - Total: 576
  - Density: 2.80/km^{2} (7.24/sq mi)
- Demonym: pongueto/a
- Time zone: UTC+1 (CET)
  - Summer (DST): UTC+2 (CEST)
- Postal code: 33557

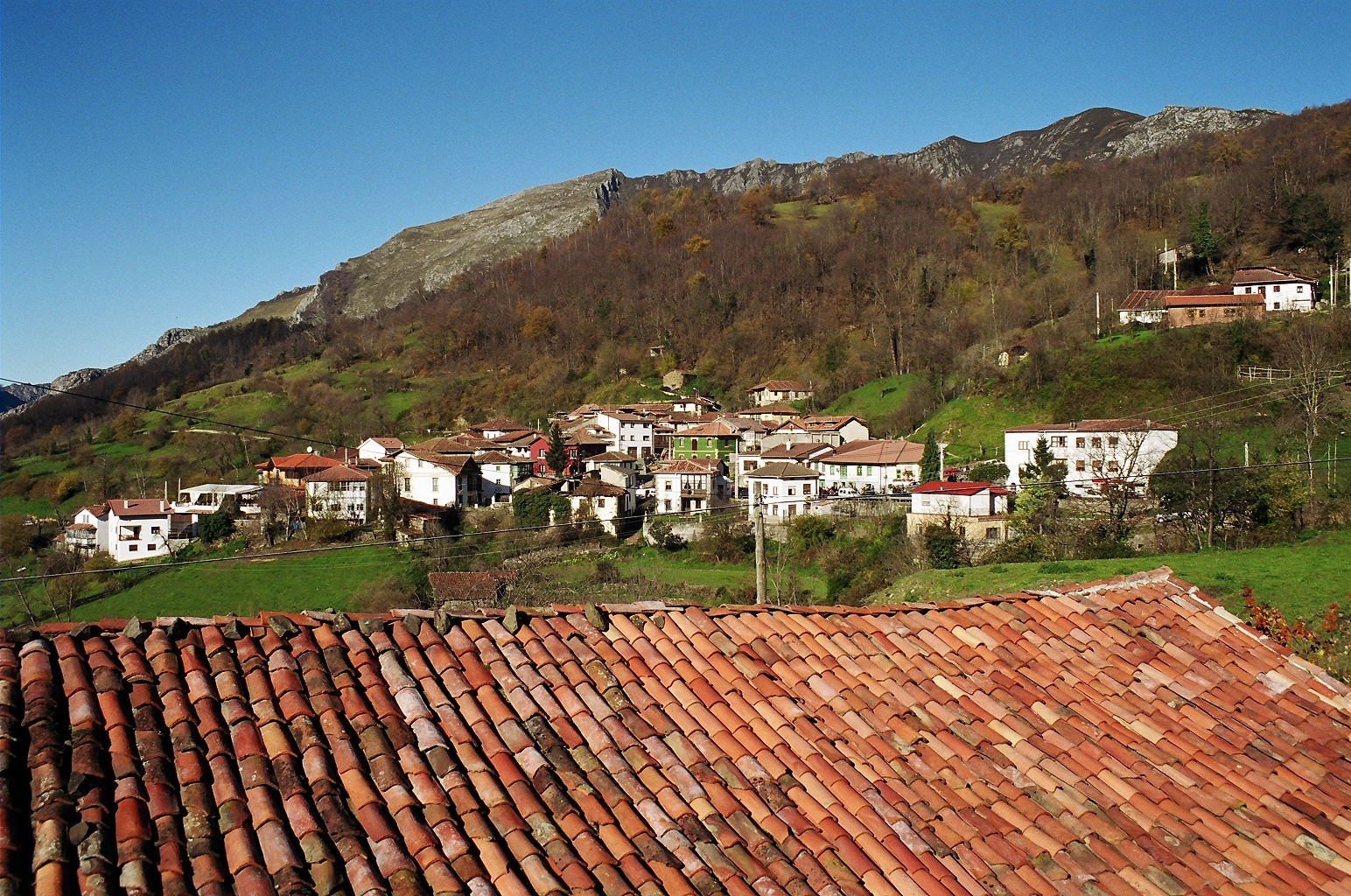
San Juan de Beleño, capital of Ponga

Ponga is a town and municipality in the province and autonomous community of Asturias, northwestern Spain. Its capital is San Juan de Beleño.

== Ecology ==
Ponga has a natural park. “Ponga-Amieva” is also the name of a Special Protection Area for wild birds in the area.

== History ==
Several archaeological remains show that the area was already inhabited in the Bronze Age. During Roman colonization, what is now Ponga belonged to the territory of Cantabria. The first documented reference of Ponga dates to the reign of Alfonso IX of León.

== Parishes ==
There are nine parishes (administrative division):

- Abiegos
- Carangas
- Casielles
- Cazo
- San Ignacio
- San Juan de Beleño
- Sobrefoz
- Tarañes
- Viego

== Culture ==
=== Art ===
Among the most notable artistic attractions are in rural churches, including:

- Church of Santa María de Tarañes (1779)
- Church of Santa María de Viego
- Church of San Juan de Beleño (17th century)
- The Ermitas of Ventaniella and Arcenorio
- Bucket Tower
- Sobrefoz Palace
- Spa Mestas

=== Holidays and festivals ===
- January 1: Feast of Aguinaldo and Guirria, San Juan de Beleño (declared a regional Fiesta de Interés Turístico)
- Carnival Saturday: Aguinaldo de Sellaño
- Holy Saturday: Market in Trasiegu, Sobrefoz
- May 13: Cheese contest and Ponga Beyos days, celebrating Beyos Cheese in San Ignacio
- Around May 15: San Isidro Labrador, San Juan de Beleño
- July 1: San Pedro, Sobrefoz
- July 16: Nuestra Señora del Carmen, San Juan de Beleño
- 31 July: San Ignacio de Loyola and Carangas Beyos
- August 4, 5 and 6: Nuestra Señora de las Nieves, Ladle and Sellaño
- August 9: San Justo, Cadenava
- August 10 and 11: San Lorenzo, Abiego
- August 15 and 16: Our Lady, Tarañes and Viego
- Last weekend of August: The Arándanu, Bedules
- September 1: La Santina de Ventaniella, Ventaniella, celebrating Our Lady of Covadonga, patroness of Asturias (nicknamed “La Santina”)
- September 8: La Santina de Arcenoriu, Arcenoriu
- Last weekend in November: Gastronomic Days of Hunting, observed in the entire council

== See also ==
- List of municipalities in Asturias
