= El Beyu =

Coordinates: 43.216771°N 5.095843°W

El Beyu (Spanish: San Ignacio) is one of nine parishes (administrative divisions) in Ponga, a municipality within the province and autonomous community of Asturias, in northern Spain.

The population is 39 (INE 2011).

== Culture ==
Its specialty is the cheese, Queso de Beyos.

== Places ==
- Bidosa
- Bores
- Canisquesu
- Coricos
- El Cantiellu
- El Collugu
- El Colláu
- El Mediu Pueblu
- El Teyéu
- El Valle Sotu
- El Xerrón
- Gusmián
- L'Arenal
- L'Horrón
- La Batuda
- La Mata'l Tornu
- Los Torneros
- Pombayón
- Robriellos
- Valbardayu
