= Viegu =

Parish in Ponga, Asturias, Spain

Coordinates: 43.198873°N 5.125049°W

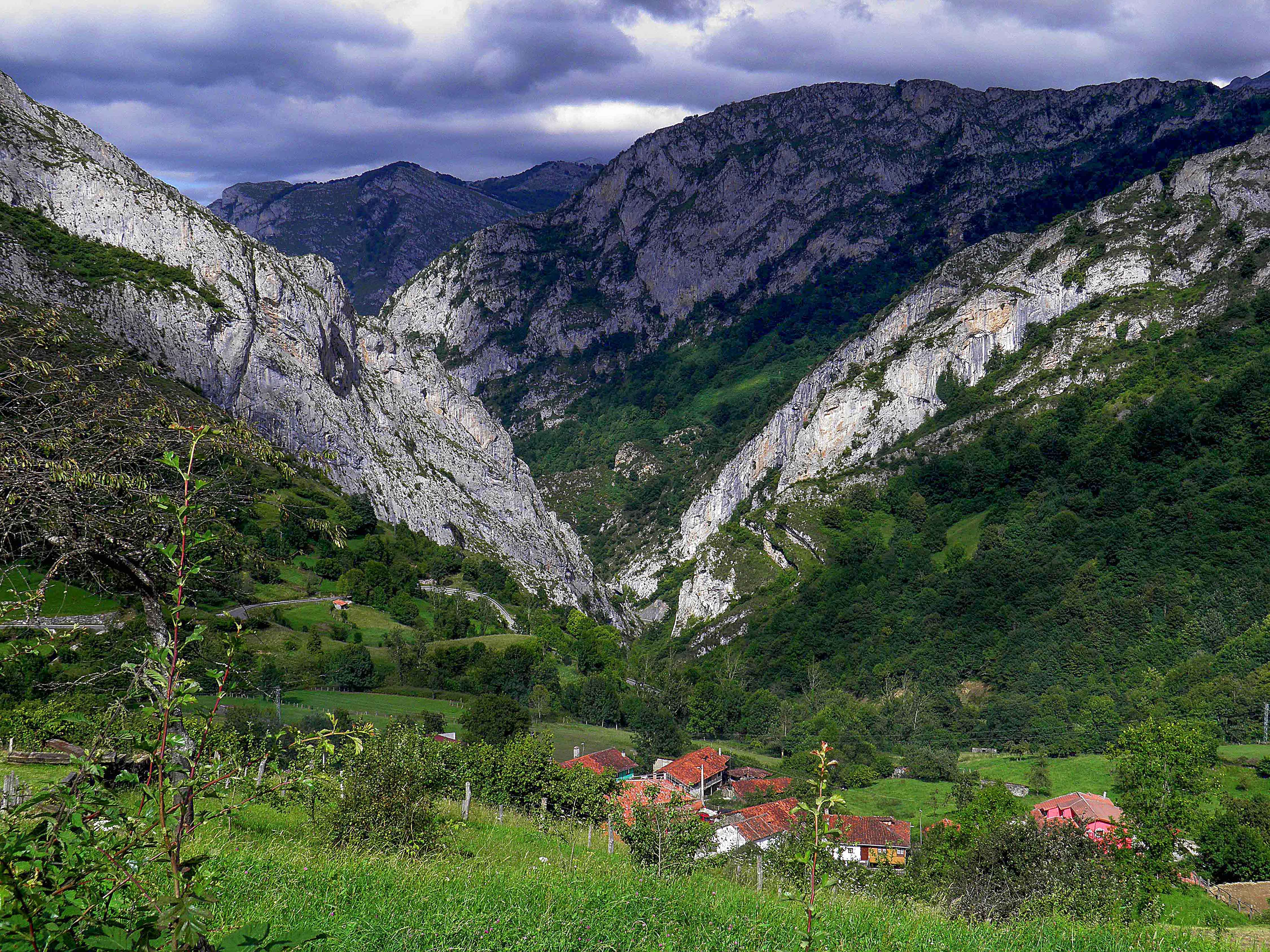
Viego (Ponga,_Asturias)

Viegu is one of nine parishes (administrative divisions) in Ponga, a municipality within the province and autonomous community of Asturias, in northern Spain.

The population is 67 (INE 2007).

== Villages and hamlets ==
- Viegu
- Vibuli
