= Carangres =

Coordinates: 43.225009°N 5.191463°W

Carangres (Spanish: Carangas) is one of nine parishes (administrative divisions) in Ponga, a municipality within the province and autonomous community of the Principality of Asturias, in northern Spain.

The population is 11 (INE 2011).

== Villages and hamlets ==
- Carangres
- Sotos
