= Casielles =

Parish in Ponga, Asturias, Spain

Coordinates: 43.187511°N 5.089034°W

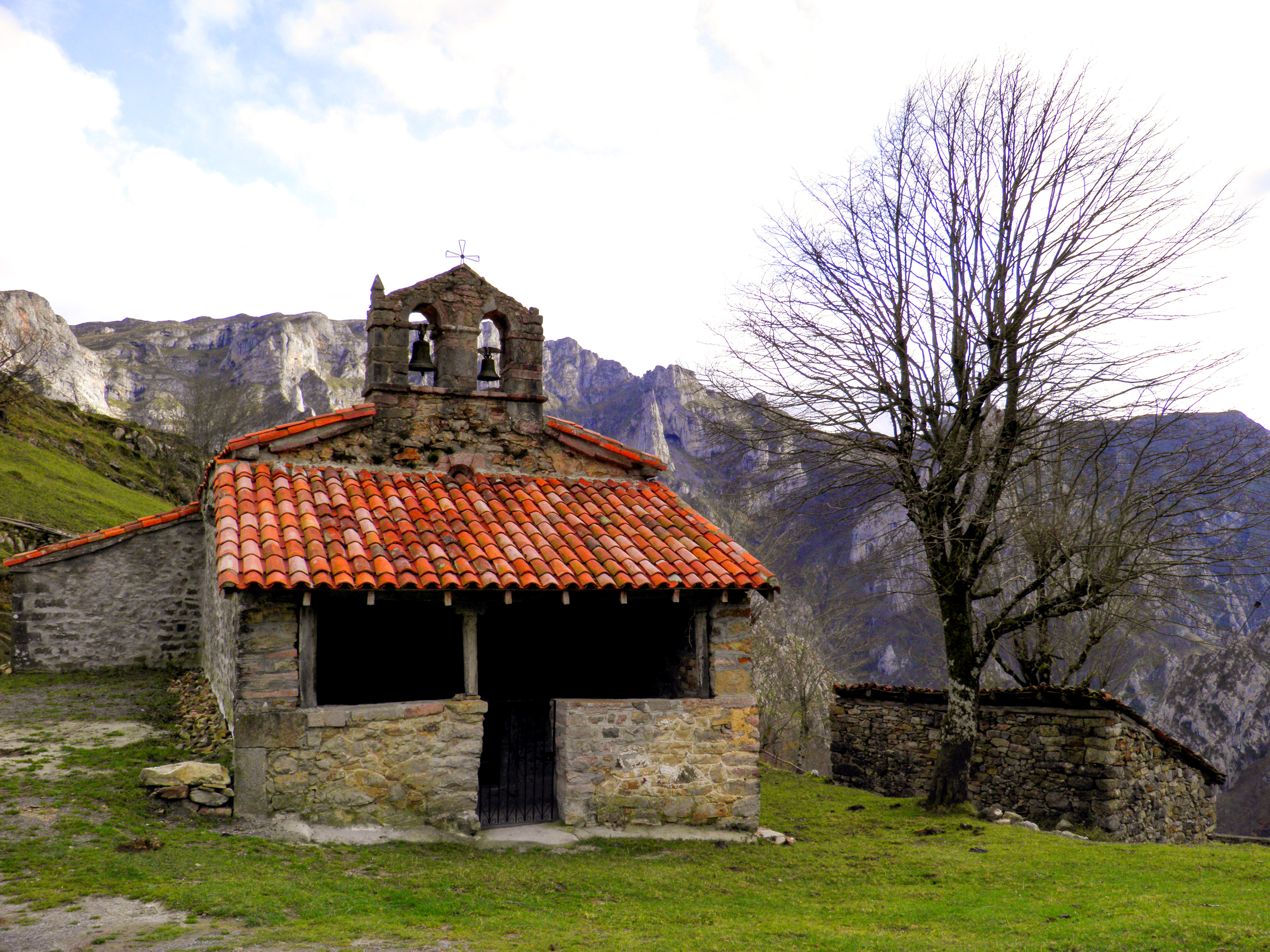

Casielles is one of nine parishes (administrative divisions) in Ponga, a municipality within the province and autonomous community of Asturias, in northern Spain.

The population is 16 (INE 2011).
