= Tarañes =

Coordinates: 43.183333°N 5.2°W

Tarañes (Spanish: Taranes) is one of nine parishes (administrative divisions) in Ponga, a municipality within the province and autonomous community of Asturias, in northern Spain.

The population is 69 (INE 2007).

== Villages and hamlets ==
Three villages make up the parish of Tarañes:

- Tanda
- Tarañes
- Vallimoru
