= Luis Alfonso de Carvallo =

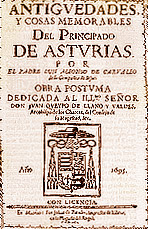
Cover of a 1695 print of "History of the Antiquity and memorable things of the Principality of Asturias"

Luis Alfonso de Carvallo, S.J. (1571 – 2 February 1635), also known as "Padre Carvallo", was a priest and an important Asturian historian of the 16th and 17th centuries.

== Life ==
Born in a poor quarter of Cangas de Tineo, now called Cangas del Narcea, the main city of Asturias, under the Crown of Castile, as a boy Carvallo became a Benedictine monk at the nearby Abbey of San Juan Bautista de Corias. In 1601 he transferred for a short time to a monastery in the Province of Leon. After his return to Asturias, he became Rector of the College of San Gregorio in Oviedo.

With the college's development into the University of Oviedo in 1608, Carvallo became the Humanities professor at the new institution. During this same period, he undertook the management of the archives of the Oviedo Cathedral, and was named a member of the cathedral chapter.

In 1616 Carvallo left the Benedictine Order and entered the novitiate of the Society of Jesus. He remained a Jesuit until his death in Villagarcía de Campos in the Province of Valladolid in 1635.

== Legacy ==
Carvallo wrote poetical essays, but his deep works about the ancient history of Asturias still remain a highlight in Asturian historiography. Many of his manuscript originals are still preserved in the Real Academia de la Historia (Royal Academy of History)

== List of works ==
- Cisne de Apolo (Apollo's Swan) (1602)
- Historia de las Antigüedades y cosas memorables del Principado de Asturias (History of the Antiquity and memorable things of the Principality of Asturias). (1613, published posthumously in 1695)
