= Cantabrian Wars =

Final stage of the Roman conquest of Hispania

Cantabrian Wars Bellum Cantabricum Cantabrian and Asturian Wars Bellum Cantabricum et Asturicum
- Part of the Roman conquest of the Iberian Peninsula
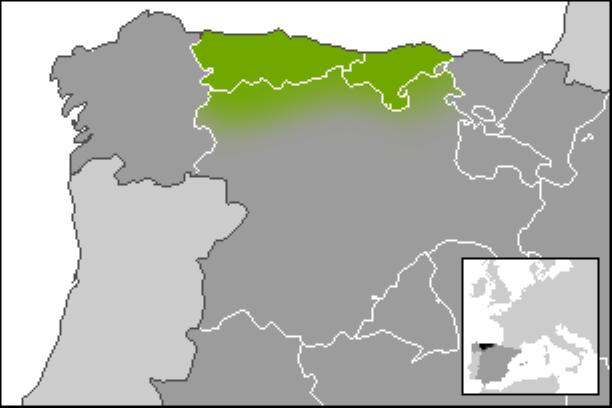
- Territories of the Iberian Peninsula where the Cantabrian Wars took place
Date	29–19 BC
Location	modern Asturias, Cantabria, Galicia, León and Palencia
Result	Roman victory
Territorial changes	Cantabria, Asturias and Gallaecia fell under Roman control as part of Hispania

Belligerents
Astures; Cantabri; Gallaeci	Roman Empire

Commanders and leaders
Corocotta (Cantabri); Gausón (Astures)	Caesar Augustus; Marcus Vipsanius Agrippa; Gaius Antistius Vetus; Gaius Firmius

Strength
70,000–100,000 (Based on pop. estimate)	70,000–80,000

Casualties and losses
Total	Heavy
- The casualties are unusual in that both the Roman army did not take prisoners, nor did the Celts allow themselves to be taken alive as slaves. The result was a massive slaughter of Cantabri and Astures at the end of the conflict.

The Cantabrian Wars (29–19 BC) (Bellum Cantabricum), sometimes also referred to as the Cantabrian and Asturian Wars (Bellum Cantabricum et Asturicum), were the final stage of the two-century long Roman conquest of Hispania, in what today are the provinces of Cantabria, Asturias and León in northwestern Spain.

During the reign of Emperor Augustus, Rome waged a bloody conflict against the Cantabri, the Astures and the Gallaeci still resisting Roman occupation, the last independent Celtic nations of Hispania. These warlike peoples fiercely resisted Roman domination; ten years of war and eight legions with their auxiliary troops – more than 50,000 soldiers in total – were needed to subdue the region.

Augustus moved to Segisama (modern Sasamon, Burgos) in 26 BC to supervise the campaign in person. The major fighting was completed in 19 BC, although there were minor rebellions until 16 BC and the Romans had to station two legions there for seventy more years.

== Antecedents ==
Sub occasu pacata erat fere omnis Hispania, nisi quam Pyrenaei desinentis scopulis inhaerentem citerior adluebat Oceanus. Hic duae validissimae gentes, Cantabri et Astures, inmunes imperii agitabant.
("In the west almost all Spain had been subjugated, except that part which adjoins the cliffs where the Pyrenees end and is washed by the nearer waters of the ocean. Here two powerful nations, the Cantabrians and the Asturians, lived in freedom from the rule of Rome.")

— Lucius Anneus Florus, Epitome de T. Livio Bellorum omnium annorum DCC Libri duo (Bellum Cantabricum et Asturicum)

The Cantabri first appear in history during earlier wars in Iberia, where they served as mercenaries on various sides. In this way, in the years preceding the wars in Cantabria and Asturias, the Roman military became familiar with the warlike characteristics of the peoples of northern Hispania. There are accounts, for instance, of Cantabrians in the army of Hannibal during the Second Punic War. Additionally, there is evidence that they fought alongside the Vaccaei in 151 BC, and helped break the Roman siege of Numantia. It is also believed that there were Cantabrian troops present in the Sertorian Wars. According to Julius Caesar's testimony, there were Cantabrians at the battle of Ilerda in 49 BC.

With all these antecedents, the Cantabrians began to be known throughout the Roman Empire. Roman troops even lost one of their standards to them, an extremely grave event. Such were the disasters and the embarrassments that, although the Roman historians justified the campaigns as retribution for Cantabrian incursions into the Roman-controlled Meseta Central, there must have been a certain lust after Asturian gold and Cantabrian iron as well.

The Astures entered the historical record in the late 3rd century BC, being listed among the Iberian mercenaries of Hasdrubal Barca’s army at the battle of Metaurus River in 207 BC. After the Second Punic War, their history is less clear. Rarely mentioned in the sources regarding the Lusitanian, Celtiberian or Roman Civil Wars of the 2nd and 1st centuries BC, they re-emerged from a relative obscurity just prior to the outbreak of the first Astur-Cantabrian war in the late 1st century BC.

The first major intervention of Rome against the peoples of the north of the Meseta was carried out in 29 BC by Statilius Taurus, who received the title of imperator from Augustus for subduing the Cantabrians, Astures and Vaccaei. Hostilities resumed In the following two years, with Calvisius Sabinus and the proconsul Sextus Apuleius achieving their respective triumphs in command of the troops. However, these victories must have been more official than real, since the peoples of the North remained independent; at least, the Cantabrians, who, according to the oldest texts, were the most rebellious. This motivated Augustus himself to move to Hispania and, at the head of the armies, begin the important campaign of 26 BC against the Cantabrians.

== Armies and strategies ==
According to the Roman historian Dio Cassius, the Cantabri used guerrilla warfare tactics, avoiding direct attacks on Roman forces because of their inferior numbers. Their better knowledge of the difficult and mountainous terrain allowed them to conduct quick surprise strikes with ranged weapons, with ambushes followed by quick retreats, causing great damage to the Roman columns and supply lines.

According to what remains from representations on coins and Cantabrian stelae, the Cantabri were skilled in light arms. Lucan referred to this when he wrote, Cantaber exiguis et longis Teutonus armis (The Cantabrian with his short weapons and the Teuton with his long ones). They were equipped with short swords, daggers, short spears and javelins, lances, round or oval shields of wood, and leather chest protection. They also used the bipennis, a type of double-headed battle axe specific to the peoples of northern Hispania. There is no proof of their use of archery or slings, although it is quite probable that they knew and used them.

The map shows the borders of the Roman Cantabria during the Cantabrian Wars, in relationship to today's Cantabria, along with the tribes that lived there, the neighboring peoples, towns and geographical features, according to classical sources.

The Cantabrian also used light cavalry, and some of their tactics would be adopted by the Roman army. Examples include the circulus cantabricus, a circular formation of javelin-throwing horsemen, and the cantabricus impetus, a massive frontal attack against enemy lines with the goal of breaching them, as described by Flavius Arrianus.

The tenacity of the Cantabrian enemy was such that Augustus was obliged to deploy eight legions in the conflict:

- I Augusta
- II Augusta
- IV Macedonica
- V Alaudae (operated in Asturias)
- VI Victrix (operated in Asturias)
- IX Hispana
- X Gemina (operated in Asturias)
- XX Valeria Victrix

as well as various auxiliary units:

- Ala Augusta
- Ala Parthorum
- Ala II Gallorum
- Ala II Thracum Victrix Civium Romanorum
- Cohors II Gallorum
- Cohors IV Thracum Equitata

These units totaled 50,000 soldiers (30,000 legionaries and 20,000 auxiliaries).

The Roman navy was also sent to the Cantabrian coast from Gallia Aquitania. It was an important factor in the Roman victory, since it completed the encirclement of the Cantabri begun by the ground forces. It is calculated that, in total, the Roman Army deployed 70,000 men, although these calculations vary amongst authors, because they used a figure of 5,000 men per legion. In reality, the figure should surpass 80,000 men counting auxiliaries since, through the reforms of Gaius Marius, the legion had about 6,000 soldiers. However, in Augustus' time, although a legion was officially composed of 6,200 men, for various reasons, the number usually oscillated between 5,000 and 8,000.

== Bellum Asturicum ==
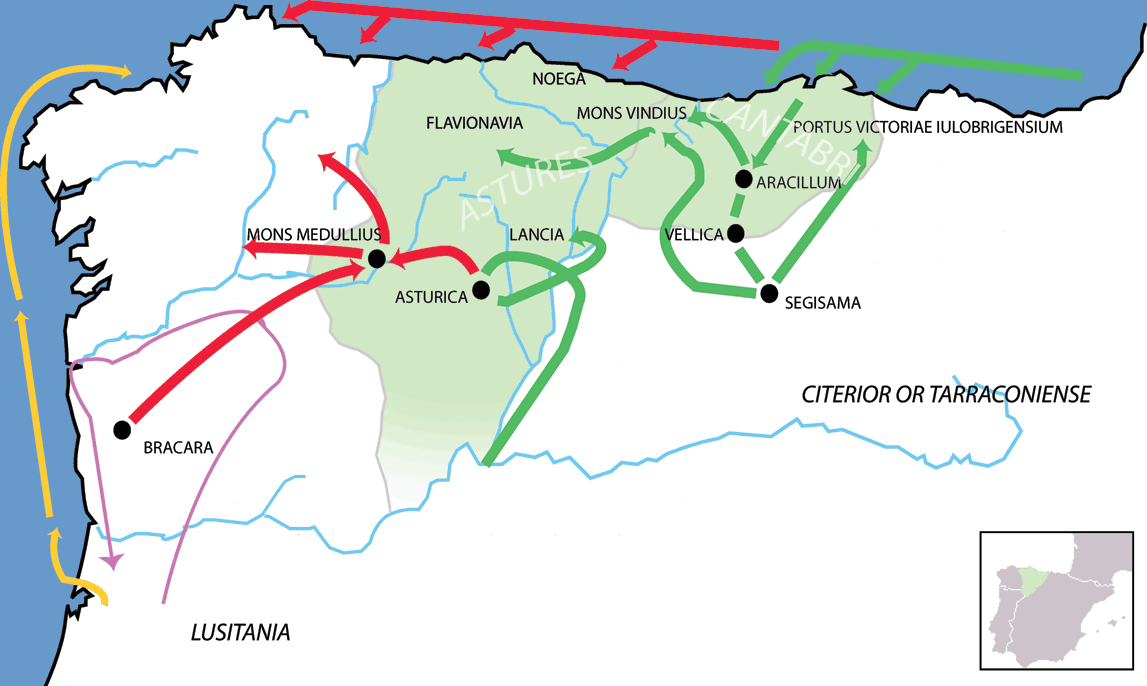
Roman campaigns versus the Cantabri and the Astures 26 BC campaign 25 BC campaign D. J. Brutus 137 BC campaign Caesar arrival

The Astures joined the Cantabri in a common defense. In spring 25 BC, there were three Roman legions established near the Astura River (modern Esla River), with troops from Hispania Tarraconensis. According to the contemporary Roman historian Florus in his Epitome of Roman History, the forces of the Astures Transmontani came down from their snow-covered mountains (which is perfectly possible in the Picos de Europa in spring) and assembled near the Astura River, preparing to attack the three Roman winter camps.

However, the Brigaecini people of the Astures Cismontani in the Benavente region informed Augustus of these plans. Augustus gave Brigantum, the camp of Augustan Asturica, to the Brigaeci as a reward for their help. Additionally, he shared land in the plains to the allies. His general Publius Carisius attacked the Astur armies (probably commanded by Gausón), forcing them to take refuge in the hillfort of Lancia, the most important Astures Cismontani fort according to Florus.

Once Lancia was besieged, the forces of the Astures took refuge in the Mons Medullius (some scholars locate it at Las Médulas basing their opinions on Florus who specifically names the site in his history of Rome). The Roman legions besieged the mountain, building a fifteen-mile-long moat and ditch. According to Orosius, the Cantabri soldiers preferred to commit suicide with their own weapons and yew tree poison rather than surrender. Following the Battle of Mons Medullius, the rest of the Gallaecian resistance was hunted relentlessly and eventually subdued by 19 BC.

A year after his arrival, Augustus had to retire to Tarragona, presumably because of illness. The conflict, however, lasted more than ten years; it serves as a reference that the Romans conquered all of Gaul in less than seven years. It was one of only two campaigns directed personally by Augustus against barbarians, the other being the one against the Illyrians from 35 to 33 BC.

== End of the conflict ==
In this conflict, unusually, the Romans chose not to take prisoners. Moreover, there was a tradition among the Celts of preferring suicide to slavery. They did this by sword, by fire, or, primarily, by poisoning themselves with potions made for the purpose. According to Silius Italicus they used a concoction made from the seeds of the yew tree, a plant with mythic significance for the Celts. Strabo said that they belittled death and pain, to the point of singing hymns of victory while being crucified. For them, according to Strabo, to die as soldiers and free men was a victory.

The major fighting was completed in 19 BC, although there were minor rebellions until 16 BC. Rome, as was their practice with other territories, began to impose their reforms. Despite the mass deaths, local resistance was such that the Romans had to station two legions (X Gemina and IV Macedonica) there for seventy more years.

Through the Cantabrian War and the surrender of the Cantabri to Rome (it would be inexact to state that the Astures ever surrendered; Augustus refused the common victory celebration in his return to Rome), the Roman legions adopted from them the solar symbol of twin crosses and lunar symbols, such as the Cantabri lábaro. They would still be carrying this standard 300 years later. The Roman army also copied from the Cantabri the cavalry tactics circulus cantabricus and cantabricus impetus.

== See also ==
- Roman conquest of Rhetia and the Alps

== Bibliography ==
- Los Cántabros antes de Roma, 2ª edición: Dr. Eduardo Peralta Labrador, Real Academia de la Historia. (2003)(in Spanish)
- Las Guerras Cántabras: Angel Ocejo Herrero y vv.aa.(in Spanish)
- Estelas Cántabras: Símbolos de un pueblo: Juan Carlos Cabria Gutiérrez, editorial Brenes XXI.(in Spanish)
- Onomástica de Cantabria - Los Nombres de Persona Cántabros: Jesús J. Maroñas.(in Spanish)
- Roma y la Conquista del Norte Peninsular: Carmen Fernández Ochoa, Historia de Asturias - La Nueva España.(in Spanish)
- The Conquest of North-West Spain. Legio VII Gemina: Ronald Syme. 1970 (in Spanish)
