= Villasabariego =

Coordinates: 42°32′N 5°24′W

- municipality
- Flag Coat of arms
- Interactive map of Villasabariego
- Country: Spain
- Autonomous community: Castile and León
- Province: León
- Municipality: Villasabariego

Area
  - Total: 59.75 km^{2} (23.07 sq mi)
- Elevation: 850 m (2,790 ft)

Population (2025-01-01)
  - Total: 1,155
  - Density: 19.33/km^{2} (50.07/sq mi)
- Time zone: UTC+1 (CET)
  - Summer (DST): UTC+2 (CEST)

Villasabariego is a municipality located in the province of León, Castile and León, Spain. According to the 2004 census (INE), the municipality had a population of 1,182 inhabitants.
