= San Xuan de Beleño =

Coordinates: 43.19121°N 5.16523°W

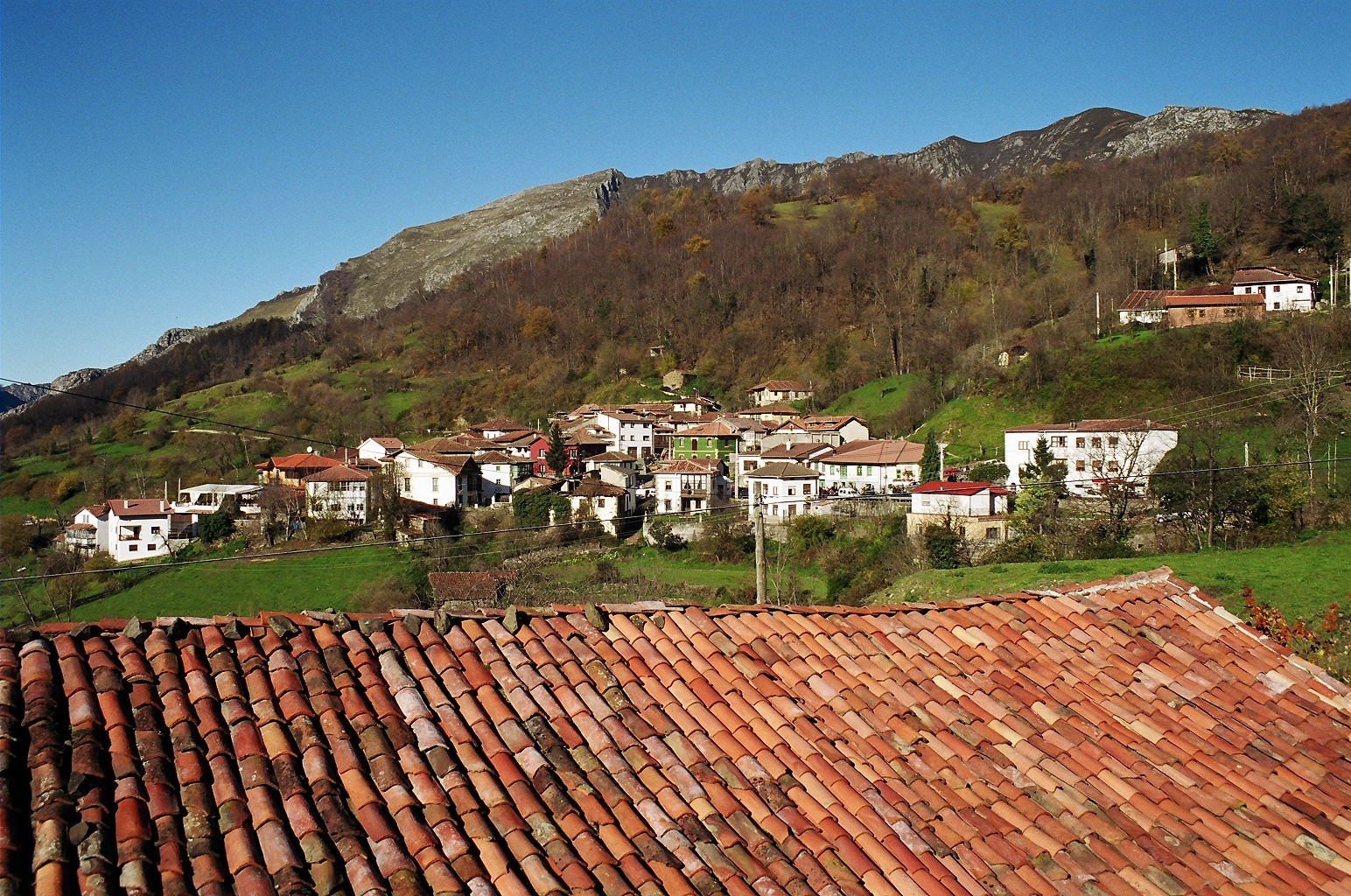
San Xuan de Beleño

San Xuan de Beleño (Spanish: San Juan de Beleño) is one of nine parishes in Ponga, a municipality within the province and autonomous community of Asturias, in coastal northern Spain.

The parroquia is 23.84 km^{2} (9.20 sq mi) in size, with a population of 154 in 2011. It stands adjacent to the mountainous Parque natural de Ponga (Ponga Natural Park).

== Villages and hamlets ==
- Cainava
- San Xuan
