= Hispanics in the Roman army =

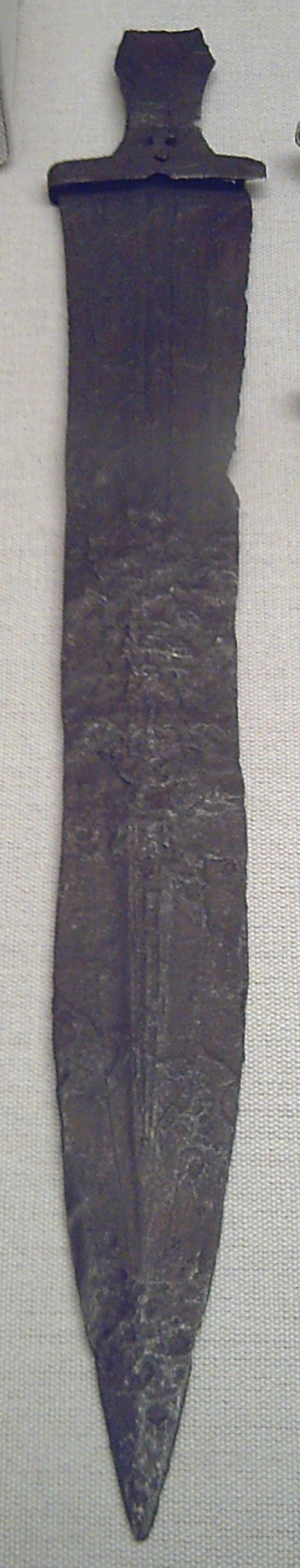
Hispanic antennae sword, template for the Roman gladius hispaniensis.

Peoples from the Iberian Peninsula played a vital role in the Roman army even before their Roman conquest was finished. The resultant province of Hispania would become the biggest source of military manpower for Rome, with Hispanics (Hispanorum) numbering only second to Italics in the imperial Roman army for the first two centuries AD, until being eventually displaced by recruited Germanic peoples in the mid-3rd century. The Hispanics, famous by their singular warrior culture, transferred to Rome the military services they had played for Carthage during the Punic Wars, serving first as auxilia and later as soldiers, bodyguards and praetorians.

== History ==
During the Roman conquest of the Iberian Peninsula, Roman armies often drafted auxilia from allied Hispanic tribes to complement their legions and Italic alae, increasing gradually as more areas of Hispania fell under Roman control. One of the usual conditions for peaceful assimilation was military assistance against enemies of Rome, which included deploying not only in Hispania, but also in Roman territories abroad. With the end of the Cantabrian Wars in 19 BC, which finished the conquest of Hispania, the peninsula was fully integrated in Rome's military complex. Strabo noted that the northern peoples of Hispania had ceased their mutual depredations and passed to serve Rome. Julius Caesar took for himself a personal guard formed by Hispanics, while his successor Augustus, the first Roman emperor and victor of the Cantabrian Wars, recruited his own bodyguards among the Celtiberians of Calagurris.

The warlike character of Hispanic peoples eased their transition to Roman military service, allowing them a way out for their warrior customs during the Romanization of Hispania and the adoption of Roman culture and institution. After Augustus' time, Hispanic auxilia gradually abandoned their warrior customs and adopted the Roman military model, passing from warriors to soldiers. One of their old customs to fade out was that of the Hispanic mercenary services, previously hired by states as varied as Carthage and Greece, which had given them a vital role in Barcid armies during the Second Punic War. Mercenaries were turned into permanent regular units in the service of Rome. As a sign of how effective Roman integration was, the peoples of the Iberian Peninsula who most strongly had resisted Romanization, like Celtiberians, Lusitanians, Vettones, Cantabri, Astures and Gallaeci, became those who provided the largest numbers of auxilia and soldiers.

By the 1st and 2nd centuries, Hispania had become the biggest and most stable source of soldiers in the Roman army after Italia, turning into a catalyst of the Romanization they had experienced themselves. At their peak, soldiers and units of Hispanic origin were deployed in all corners of the empire, including Britain, Africa, Germania, Egypt and the Near East. They were favored during the mandate of Vespasian, who granted Latin rights to all of Hispania, and especially under those of Trajan and Hadrian, emperors raised in Hispania to boot. Hispanics only started being progressively outnumbered in the Roman armies by the Germanic peoples who migrated into the empire after mid-3rd century, having their swan song with the campaigns of Marcus Aurelius.

== Organization ==
People of Hispania were attracted to Roman military service by promises of survival, promotion and glory, especially given that martial feats were highly valued in their native societies. However, careers in the Roman military also granted rewards within the imperial machine, which could include lands, money and Roman citizenship for those who did not have it already. This changed radically the landscape of Hispania, as Hispanics became citizens and settled in the empire, just like Roman and Italic veterans had settled down in colonies in the province. Veterans of Hispanic origin usually did not return to the peninsule during their retirement, but settled down in the provinces where they had served.

=== Auxiliaries and legionaries ===
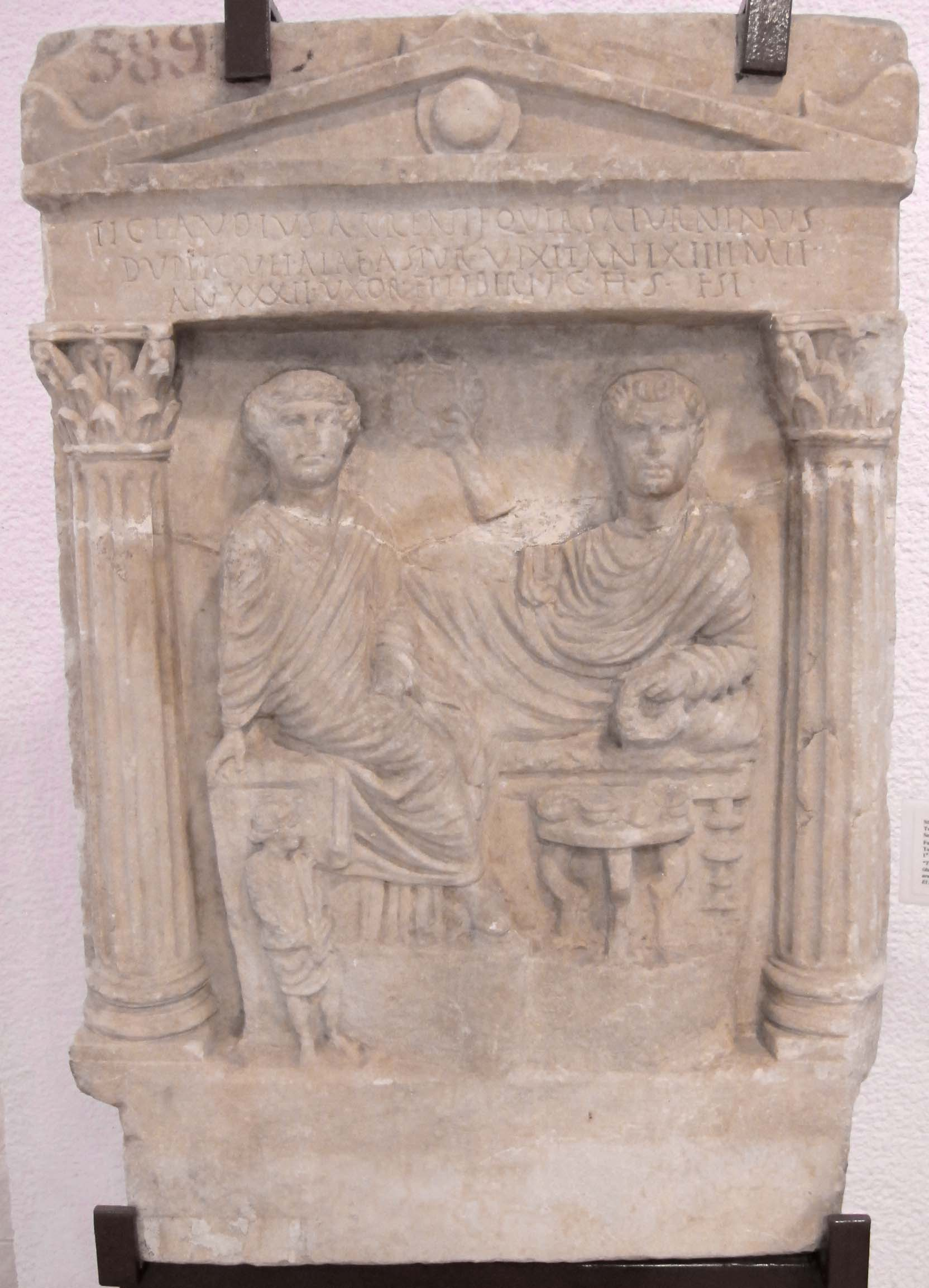
Funerary stele of a veteran from the Ala I Asturum, in Tomi, Romania.

In earlier times, auxilia from Hispania were concentrated in 500–1.000 men units by ethnicity and origin, usually limited to one, like the Cantabrian groups Cohors I Cantabrorum and Cohors II Cantabrorum, or two, as in the Astur-Gallaeci group Cohors I Asturum et Callaecorum. They were initially equipped with their native weapons and armor, but after the times of August most of them adopted the Roman trappings, especially with their transition from auxiliar cohorts to legions, although by the 2nd century there was still some light infantry contingents serving in native gear. As recruitment was performed appealing to their tribal customs, Hispanic auxiliaries were commanded by their own chiefs and carried their original standards for a long time.

The Roman army adopted several elements from these troopers, like the native banner called cantabrum and the Cantabrian circle cavalry formation. The cantabrum probably developed over time into the labarum, the imperial banner used by Constantine, whose ceremonial standardbearers were called cantabrarii. Alternately, the labarum might also come from an X-shaped Gaul sigil associated to the god Taranis, used also by the Hispanic Varduli in the Roman army and possibly related to the posterior Saint Andrew's Cross.

There is evidence of at least 80 different units from the Iberian Peninsula in Roman history, although their composition was probably not homogeneous given that casualties were supplied with recruits from the areas where they stationed. The reverse was also true, as distinctively non-Hispanic legions were reinforces with recruits from the Iberian Peninsula, like it was the case of Legio VI Victrix and Legio X Gemina. The arrival of the Flavian dynasty brought the new global sorting of Hispanorum or Hispanic in an ample sense, reflecting generalized recruitment in all of Hispania as established by Vespasian, as well as units tied to cities instead of ethnicities.

=== Praetorians ===
While most Hispanic soldiers were integrated as either auxiliaries or legionaries, a significant number of them also passed the harsh requirements of the Praetorian Guard, which was predominantly Italic in composition but featured minor numbers of Hispanics, Macedonians and Norics. The number of Hispanic praetorians increased in the times of Trajan and Hadrian, hailing from a mix of Roman families settled in Hispania and Hispanic natives Latinized by Vespasian. Their prefect Publius Acilius Attianus himself sharing this background, as the emperor themselves did. Their number, however, decreased steeply with the reforms of Septimius Severus, who mistrusted them due to their role in the assassination of Commodus and counterbalanced them with recruits from other areas.

== See also ==
- Warfare in the ancient Iberian Peninsula
- Mercenaries of the ancient Iberian Peninsula

== Bibliography ==
- Rodríguez García, Gonzalo (2019). Los celtas. Héroes y magia. Almuzara. ISBN 9788417954055.
- Ortiz Córdoba, J. (2022). "La presencia de soldados y veteranos hispanos en Italia en época romana (siglos I-II d. C.)". El Futuro del Pasado, 14, 191–217.
- Ortiz Córdoba, J. (2022). "Hispani en la milicia urbana de Roma: praetoriani, urbaniciani, vigiles y equites singulares Augusti". Paleohispánica, ISSN 1576–5386
- Palao Vicente, J. J. (2010). "El regreso de los veteranos legionarios hispanos a la península ibérica". Hispania Antiqua. 85–110
- Peralta Labrador, Eduardo (2003). Los cántabros antes de Roma. Real Academia de la Historia. ISBN 9788489512597.
- Pitillas Salañer, E. (2006). "Soldados auxiliares del ejército romano originarios del noroeste de Hispanis (S. I. d. C.)". HAnt XXX 21–34.
- Roldán Hervás, J. M. (1997). "Los hispanos en el ejército romano". La guerra en la antigüedad: Una aproximación al origen de los ejércitos en Hispania, por Juan Antonio García Castro, Víctor Antona del Val, Leticia Azcue Brea, 1997, págs. 299-310
