= Caetrati =

Type of ancient Iberian light infantry

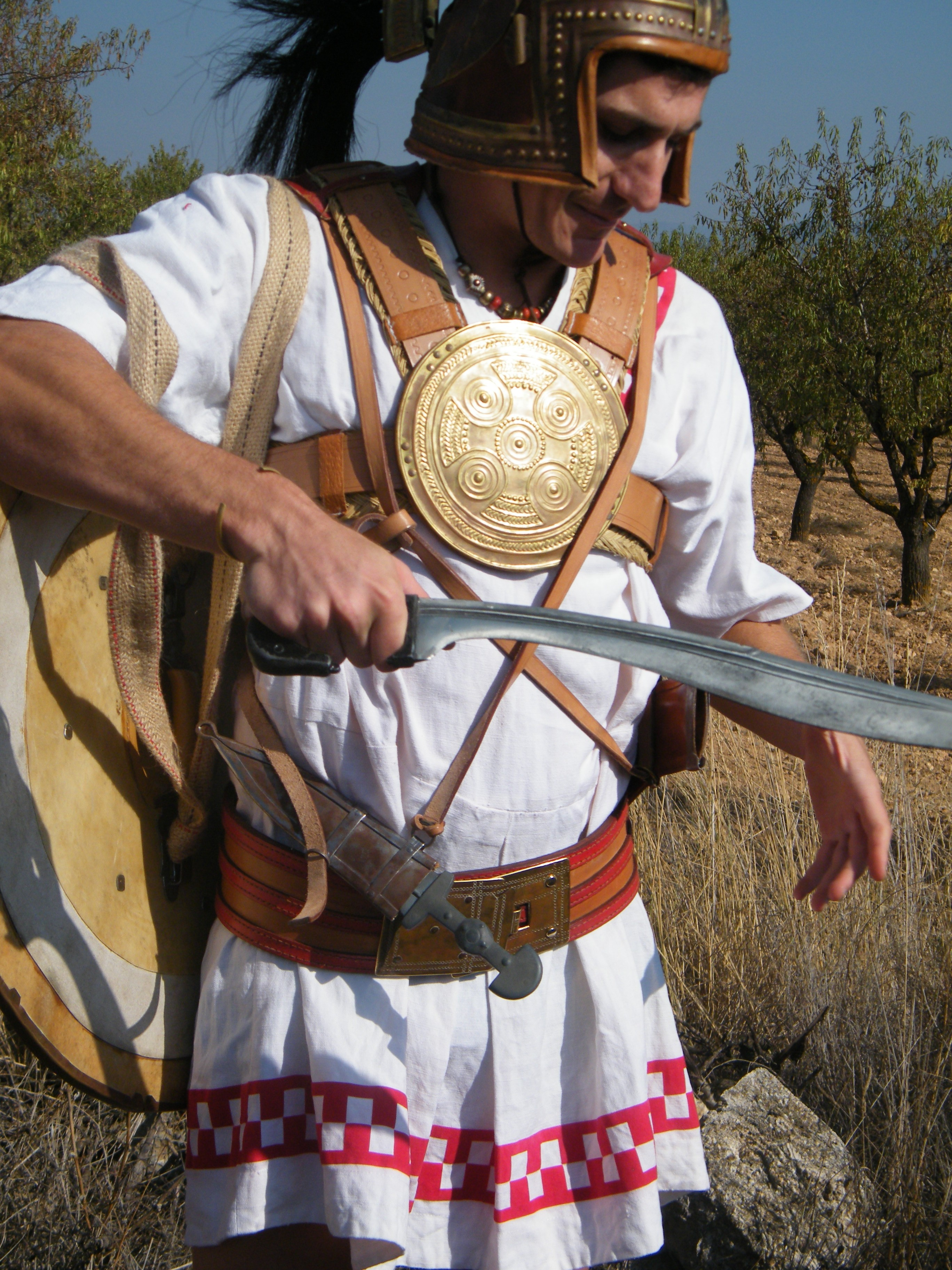
Iberian Caetratus reenactor of the 3rd Century B.C.

The Caetrati were a type of light infantry in ancient Iberian warfare who often fought as skirmishers. They were armed with a caetra shield, swords, and javelins.

== History ==
Iberian warriors had been fighting as mercenaries throughout Europe since the 5th century BC, with their ferocity in battle and their fighting skills making them very good additions to any ancient army. The Carthaginian general Hannibal made excellent use of them during his campaigns against Rome during the Second Punic War; when the Romans defeated Carthage and conquered its colonies in Hispania, they soon began to expand their borders in the region; it took them 200 years to fully conquer and pacify the region. These warriors fought vigorously against the Romans, especially under the leadership of Viriathus the Lusitanian and his guerrilla tactics that the Romans had never seen before. Being agile by nature, and wearing almost no armour at all, these warriors were extremely mobile and would use hit-and-run tactics to harass the enemy and break their formations.

== Equipment ==
=== Body armor ===
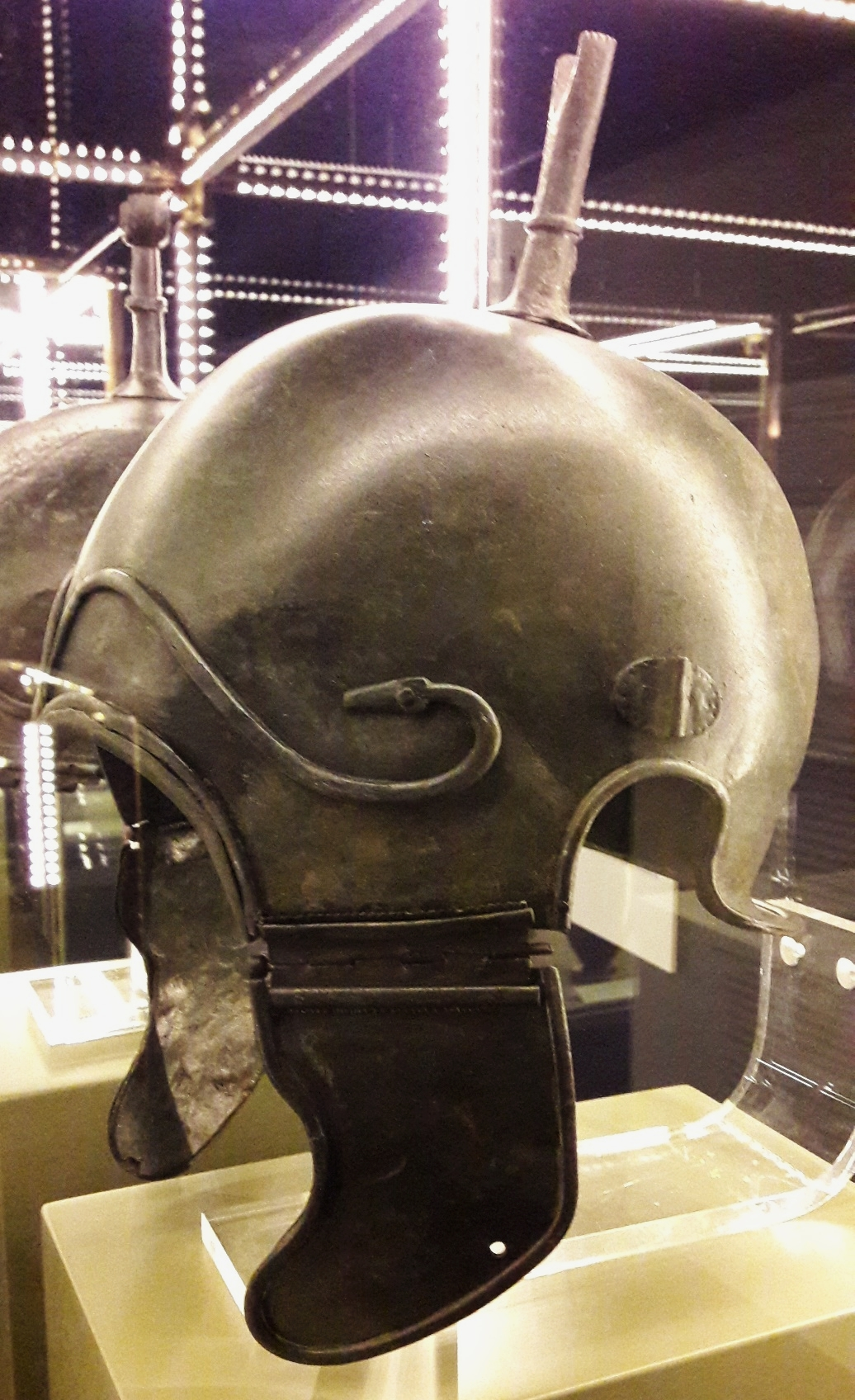
Iberian-Celtic helmet of the Chalcidian type 02

The majority of these soldiers wore simple tunics and lacked real armour because they relied on greater mobility. The cardiophylax was a very common piece of protection in ancient Iberia, most likely circular and with decorations and reliefs depicting animals and patterns. Strabo states the Celtiberians used a linen cuirass, probably in the Greek style. On the other hand, a number of vase paintings clearly show Iberian infantrymen wearing cuirasses of mail armour, with leather straps hanging down to protect the abdomen, but these heavier types of armour were probably used by the scutarii instead. The Iberians do not seem to have worn greaves, but Strabo states the Celtiberians did, and a number of reliefs do show infantrymen wearing greaves and short boots. The greaves may have been of metal or leather, but the ordinary soldier would probably have had greaves of felt.

=== Helmets ===
The Iberians wore bronze helmets, sometimes of Greek and Corinthian shape (due to Greek influence and trade in the southern and eastern parts of the peninsula), with either a low or high crest, but they seem to have been rare. They were probably worn only by the nobles and the tribal leaders. The crests are said to have been purple or crimson. The most common headwear seems to have been a simple helmet of bronze or leather, occasionally extended at the back to form a neckguard and with cheek guards added at the sides. Strabo says the Lusitanians wore helmets of sinew with a crest, and sculptures in southern Spain and South-west France do show some form of crested cap or hood. Diodorus Siculus says the Celtiberians wore helmets of brass or copper with red plumes. Another helmet widely used was the Montefortino helmet.

==== Montefortino ====
These helmets were mass-produced and used during the First and Second Punic Wars, the Celtiberian Wars, the Lusitanian Wars and in the Civil War between Caesar and Pompey. Montefortino helmets were believed to have originated in the Celtic occupied lands of northern Italy and soon became very common throughout the entire western Mediterranean. This helmet was so well thought of, and at the time so advanced, that it has been supposed that the Romans rapidly adopted it into their army. The Lusitanians seem to have not worn face guards perhaps because they blocked peripheral vision or just got in the way during combat. The soldiers would place a mane of dyed horse hair of various colours in it, or coloured feathers, perhaps to identify which tribe or military unit he belonged to or to signify rank, like a Roman centurion worn to indicate status within the Roman military formation.

=== Shield ===
==== Caetra ====
This was the only shield these light infantrymen used, hence their name. The shield was circular, with a diameter between 30 cm and 90 cm. It was tied to the warrior's body with ropes or leather strips that passed over the shoulder and that gave great mobility to fight both on foot and on horseback. The shapes and decorations of the shields had variations in their metal, wood or leather protection. In combat, the shield was not only effective at blocking, but also an extremely proficient secondary weapon: Iberian troops used the boss to punch opponents. These compact bucklers could be hung on a belt or across the back by a strap, so as not to be burdensome to the soldier on the march or foraging for food, but still handy for when the enemy was close. Cavalry would usually carry the buckler so as to not over encumber their mounts or limit their horsemanship.

=== Swords ===
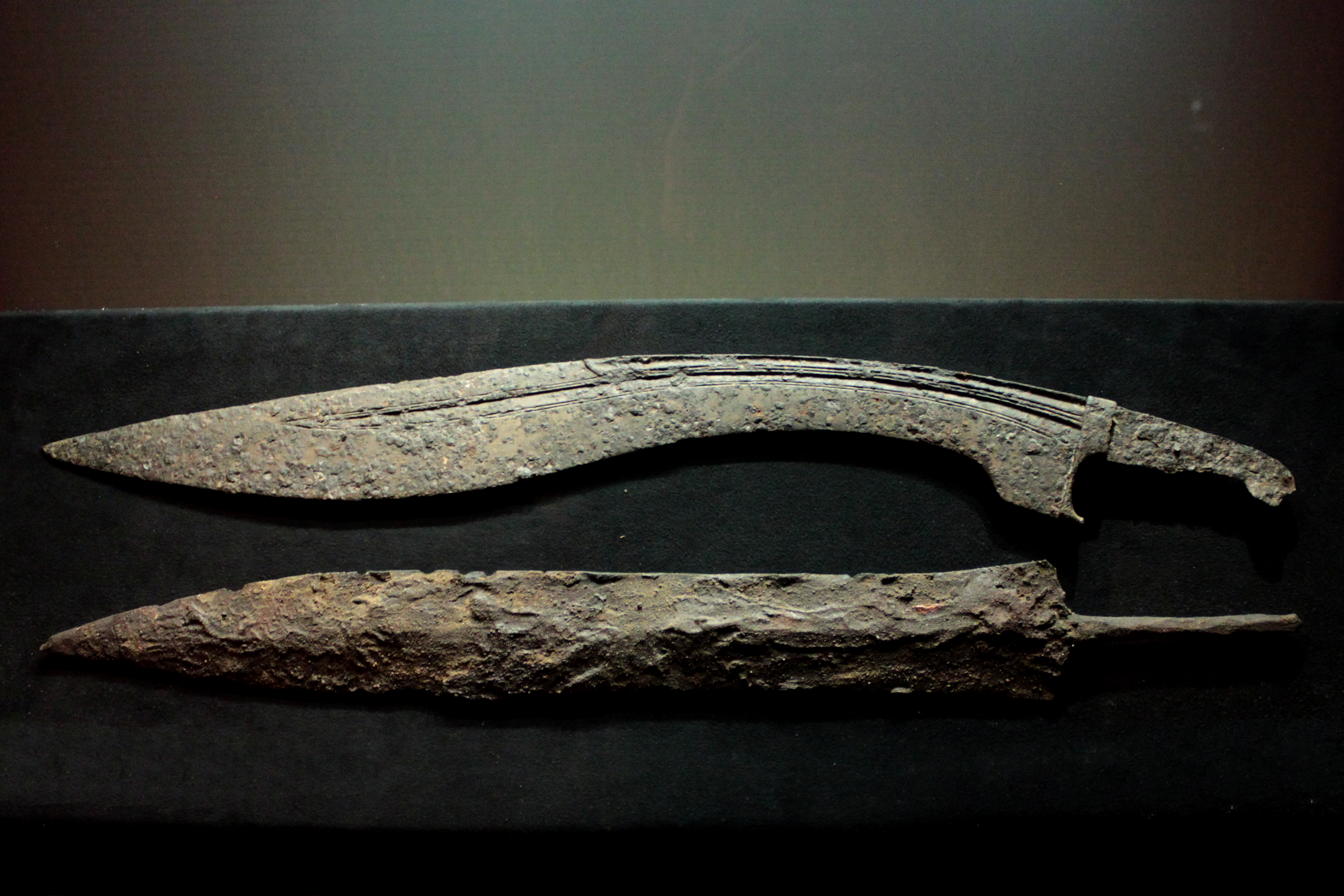
Iberian falcata and gladius

Of all the weapons the Caetrati bore, the sword is the one that stands out the most. Iberians, Celtiberians and Lusitanians were among the finest swordsman of their time.

==== Falcata ====
The most emblematic weapon used by these warriors. It was without a doubt their weapon of choice for over several centuries. This can be said due to the large amounts of these swords found on excavation sites throughout Portugal and Spain.

According to the classical texts, the falcata used in the Iberian Peninsula was manufactured to perfection. Lusitanian warriors maintained a spiritual connection to their swords and when they died their swords were buried with them. Diodorus reports that the falcatas were of such superior quality that no helmet, shield or bone could resist its devastating effect.

==== Gladius Hispaniensis ====
References to the gladius hispaniensis are abundant in classical texts. During the Roman conquest of the Iberian Peninsula, the Romans experienced firsthand the effectiveness of this sword. In the beginning of the Roman presence on the peninsula during the Second Punic War, Roman legions came into contact with Iberian mercenaries, impressed with the technical and operational levels of their swords, they quickly adopted and began using Iberian swords.

=== Spears ===
Warriors from Iberia made extensive use of spears. The spear was used by all iberian tribes and was described by many different terms, indicating a vast variety of models. They would throw the javelins in volleys to disorganize the enemy formation before charging into close combat with swords. These warriors used the javelin with deadly accuracy. From modern archaeological research, there seems to have been an assortment of spears which have been classified into three groups: traditional and conventional spears of wooden shafts and metal heads, the all-iron type called soliferrum by the Romans, and Lances.

==== Falarica ====
Of all the conventional spears and javelins the Iberian people used, the falarica was the most dreaded. Livy makes a reference to it when mentioning that the falarica was used by the iberians against the Carthaginians near Saguntum. The falarica was a javelin with a long iron pointed rod of about 90 cm (35 inches) in length with a short wooden handle. Although the iron spearhead was a thin rod, a section was thick, giving the weapon weight to further improve its ability to penetrate and making it an armour-piercing weapon. Several vase paintings show the use of javelin thongs, wound round the shaft to impart a stabilizing spin and additional thrust when it was thrown. This weapon was so feared that when it stuck into a shield without entering the body, it terrified the enemy. As well as being a throwing spear, it was also used as a ranged incendiary device: bundles of grass or packs filled with a combustible substance were bound to it and ignited. During sieges, the burning falarica was thrown against wooden palisades and thatched roofs to start fires and cause havoc. When the Iberians were besieged, they hurled flaming falaricas at the besiegers’ siege engines. As an incendiary device, it had an enormous psychological effect, helping to spread fear among enemy troops.

==== Soliferrum ====
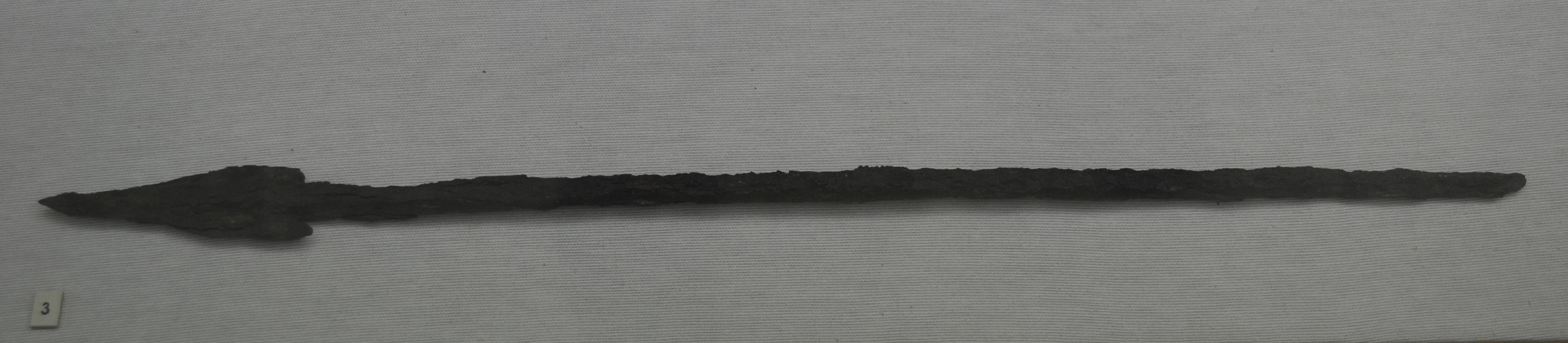
Iberian soliferreum from the Bastida de les Alcusses. Prehistory Museum of Valencia

The soliferrum was an Iberian ranged pole weapon made entirely of iron. It was forged from a single piece of iron usually measuring between 1.5 and 2 meters in length and around 1 cm in diameter. Though slim, the central part was usually thickened to facilitate a hand's grip. Sometimes there were mouldings of about 10 cm wide in the middle of the weapon to further improve grip and to prevent it from slipping because of sweaty hands. The soliferrum was an extremely effective heavy javelin. The weight and the density of its iron shaft, its small diameter and its narrow tip made the soliferrum an excellent armour-piercing weapon when it was thrown at close range, enabling it to further penetrate heavy shields and armour. Unlike the falarica, the soliferrum remained in use in the Iberian Peninsula under Roman rule until the end of the third century AD.

==== Tragula ====
In the collection at the Archaeological Museum of Zaragoza there is another type of throwing weapon which is rarely found, known as a tragula. The tip of this barbed spear came in several different forms. Usually it had only a sharpened tip with two or more small protruding spikes. This hybrid spear was something of a dart or arrow which was thrown from a long leather thong by which it was then recovered if possible. It proved to be dangerous to its user and deadly to its victim, for the barbed dart required to be cut out of its victim. Some minted Roman-Iberian coins bore on their reverse sides a military motif of a rider armed with a tragula.

== Bibliography ==
- Viriathus and the Lusitanian Resistance to Rome 155-139 BC
- The Roman Wars in Spain
- The Early History of Rome
- Lake Trasimene 217 BC:
