= Warfare in the ancient Iberian Peninsula =

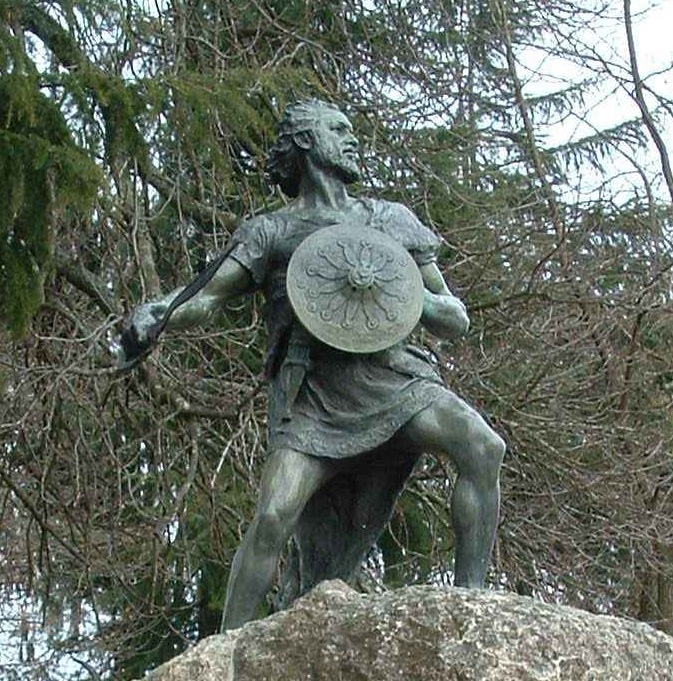
Statue of Viriathus at Viseu, Portugal.

Warfare in ancient Iberian Peninsula played an important role in historical chronicles, first during the Carthaginian invasion of Hispania, including the Punic Wars, and later during the Roman conquest of the peninsula. The bellicose character of the Pre-Roman peoples who inhabited Hispania was repeatedly shown in their conflicts against Rome, Carthage and each other.

== History ==
Roman advance through Hispania.

Roman and Greek historians agree that most Hispanic peoples were warrior cultures where tribal warfare was the norm. The poverty of some regions, as well as the reigning oligarchy of their populations, drove their youth to seek resources in richer areas, both by mercenary work and banditry. This generated a convulsed national environment where fighting was the main way of living. Hispanic indigenous are described as men who loved war, preferred death before capitulation, and professed a strong loyalty (devotio) to whomever they perceived as their war leaders. Weapons were considered sacred and a sign of distinction by warriors, to the point handing them over was seen as less preferable than being killed. Their cultural values about war have been compared to those of Germanic and ancient Greek warfare, as well as other Celtic nations. Through their military history, there are numerous examples of besieged cities whose inhabitants chose to die of starvation, mass suicide or uncompromising battle instead of surrendering. Numantia, Saguntum and Calagurris are some examples.

Forces from the Iberian Peninsula and its surrounding islands were especially relevant during the Second Punic War, in which they constituted an instrumental part of the Carthaginian armies in their conflict against Rome. Even after the end of the war, Hispanic natives delayed Roman conquest of their territories during almost two centuries. The course of this conquest reached such levels of violence that Cicero would describe the Roman efforts as not fighting for gain, but for survival. The conquest comprised the Lusitanian, Celtiberian, and Cantabrian Wars, particularly the first, in which the chieftain Viriathus came to control most of the Iberian Peninsula and even forced Rome to sign, even if temporally, a peace treaty on his own terms. Viriathus would never concede a decisive defeat and would die murdered. After conquered, the bravery, loyalty and fighting skill of Hispanics turned them into coveted units of the Roman army, especially during the Sertorian War and other late exploits of the Roman empire.

== Military organization ==
There are records of Iberian timocratic armies and large militia coalitions formed by Celtiberian peoples, although most warfare in Hispania was waged in an irregular, tribal manner. Warring would be waged less to control territory than to sack and plunder goods, and fighters were vassals or mercenaries before than professional soldiers. By this reason, their armies were usually small in comparison to other Mediterranean nations, being often formed around specific chieftains and war leaders, whom they venerated.

=== Infantry ===
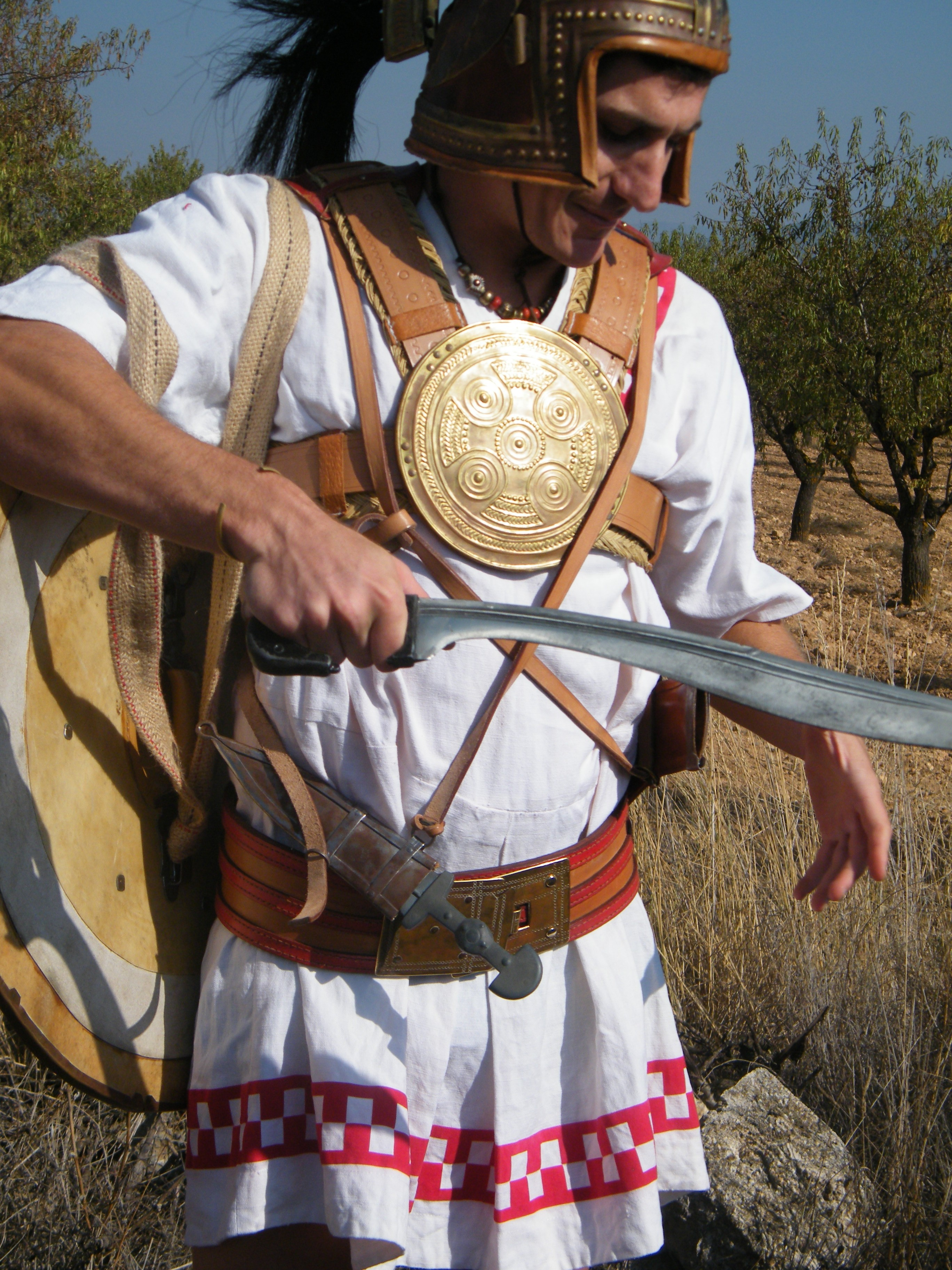
Recreation of a southern Iberian caetrati.

Infantry in Hispania was usually lightly armored, compared to the Hellenistic peltast by ancient chroniclers, although modern authors have compared them rather to thyreophoroi as a dual purpose infantry. Roman authors noted Hispanic infantry resembled their own in weapon choices and combat tactics, such as favoring the sword and the javelin by line troops, and only emphasized differences in organization, logistics and discipline.

The Hispanic light equipment granted them mobility and quickness, apt to execute running attacks and skirmishes, though contratry to the stereotype, their weapons and shields also made them fit for close combat, and they could competently engage in massed fighting. Iberians and Celtiberians occupied comfortably the vanguard of Hannibal's army at the Battle of Cannae, divided in speirai (units similar to Roman maniples) and side to side to his Gaul contingent, while Balearic slingers supported them from behind. Even Lusitanians, who were eminently known as skirmishers, could outperform enemies in frontal fighting.

After the triumphant Lusitanians had dispersed in safety, one became greatly separated from his colleagues. He was surrounded by cavalrymen, but though he was on foot, he ran through one of their horses with his javelin and beheaded the trooper with a single blow of his sword. In this way he struck all of them with fear and walked away in contemptuous and leisurely fashion as they looked on.

— Orosius, 5, 4

Hispanic swordsmen stand out in chronicles for their toughness and lethal effect. Populations from the Mediterranean coast would favor the falcata, while most other peninsular peoples favored the gladius, which would be adopted by the Roman military for its excellence at both cutting and stabbing. Armor was usually light and made of leather, and shields were used in two main forms: the small, round caetra, which gave its owners the Roman name of caetrati, and the other was the heavier, oval scutum, similar to the thyreos or the Gallic longshield, whose carriers would be called scutarii. Balearic slingers would use hardened leather shields tied to one arm in order to leave both hands free to use their slings.

Ranged weapons included them slings and javelins (comprising several types of those, like the falarica and soliferrum). Aside from javelin casters, Balearians were legendary slingmen among the rest of Hispanic tribes. They were taught from childhood to use accurately slings of several sizes, and employed them to throw stones heavier than most slinshot of the time, every shot weighing around 1 mina (15.3 ounces/436g). Most other peninsular tribes might have preferred smaller stone or lead bullets as slingshot. The bow and arrow, introduced through Phoenician and Greek contact, was very rarely used, if at all, and possibly limited to hunting.

They stood out for bellowing battle cries to intimidate their enemies. Celtiberian warriors might have also used orange war paint.

=== Cavalry ===
Iberian Peninsular cavalry, first developed in the central Meseta in the fourth century BC and later extended to coastal regions, was particularly renowned. Chronicles continually extol Hispanic horses, describing them as fast, strong and well tamed. They were accustomed to climb mountainous roads, easily leaving behind their Italic homologues, and were also taught to obey their owners and wait for them if dismounted in midst of the battlefield. This was a custom of Ilergete and Celtiberian cavalrymen, as they often dismounted to fight on their feet at a tactical necessity, relegating their mounts as ways to retreat quickly. Others would use shock troops tactics, wearing armor and wielding spears and heavy shields.

Hispanic horsemen worked as mercenaries first by Carthage and later by Rome. During the Second Punic War, riders from Celtiberia, Lusitania and Vettonia were used by Hannibal as heavy cavalry, in stark contrast to the more famed Numidian skirmishing cavalry. Livy compared them favorably against the Numidians, stating that Hispanic riders were "their equals in speed and their superiors in strength and daring". Among them is mentioned a unit from the Celtiberian city of Uxama, whose riders wore helmets with jaws of beasts to scare their enemies away. Due to their performance at the battles of Trebia and Cannae, Livy would even state that Hispanic cavalry was superior to any other in the war. They were also used for mountain warfare:

In fact, there was no peace for the Romans even in winter quarters. Numidian cavalry ranged far and wide and Celtiberians and Lusitanians were doing so wherever the ground proved too difficult for the Numidians.

— Livy 21, 57, 5

This eventually led the Roman military to ask for their own horsemen to the Celtiberian cities under their domain, using them to counter their Carthaginian homologues and for psychological warfare against them. After the Punic Wars and the Roman conquest of Hispania, Roman military acquired peninsular horses and riders as auxiliaries. Particularly famous examples are found in the late alae quinquagenaria, which contained three Astur Ala Asturum forces, two Arevaci Ala Arevacorum and a famed Vetton contingent named Ala Hispanorum Vettonum.

=== Strategy and tactics ===
The style of warfare in Hispania was usually tied to the way of living of the tribes employing them. Developed peoples like Iberians and Celtiberians engaged in conventional pitched battles in close formation, often in wedge, while less developed tribes like Lusitanians and Cantabrians favored guerrilla warfare, including surprise attacks and ambushes. As such, pitched battle was predominantly used in conflict against other Mediterran powers, but not superlatively, given that it usually fared poorly against the better organized, disciplined Roman and Carthaginian armies. However, during the Roman conquest of Hispania, Viriathus elevated the guerrilla style to its maximum measure of success against the invading forces, causing its idealization in modern times and its extrapolation to virtually all the peninsular peoples. Hispania was recognized as a cradle of skilled strategists by ancient authors, especially Frontinus. Viriathus himself was called "the Barbarian Hannibal" by Lucilius.

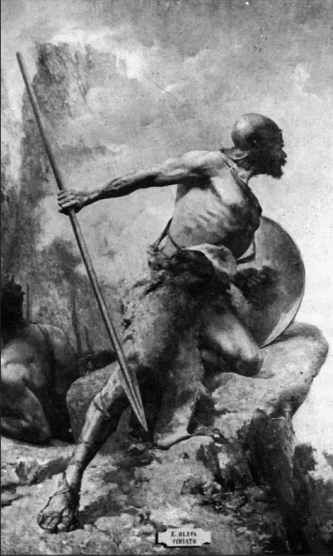
Viriathus armed with lance and shield.

A particular tactic made famous by Caesarus and Viriathus was called concursare ("bustling"), where their forces would charge against the enemy lines, only for them to stop and retreat after a brief clash or without engaging at all. This technique would be repeated as many times as needed in order to goad the opposing force into giving chase, which would be capitalized on to lead them to ambushes and new sudden attacks. The method of turning pursuers into pursued by feigned retreat, often described by modern authors as "turn and fight," was a specialty of Lusitanians, who used it even when their retreat was genuine. The Celtic and Iberian cavalrymen sent by Dionysius I against the Thebans are described as performing scattered charges against the enemy line with javelins, retreating when the enemy began to move forth against them, and dismounting to rest between assaults.

Authors also praised the way in which Hispanic warriors combined and transitioned between cavalry and infantry. The cavalry tactics referred above, where horsemen would become footsoldiers and vice versa when needed, exemplified this ability. Another tactic favored in Hispania saw riders carrying a second warrior on their horses, who they would deploy to form contingents of footsoldiers before extracting them from the battlefield the same way. Roman armies also adopted cavalry tactics used by Cantabrian warriors, among them circulus cantabricus and cantabricus impetus.

Hispanic warriors would also use local fauna in warfare. There are records of Oretani chieftain Orissus using bulls or oxen with burning horns to scare Hamilcar Barca's war elephants, as well as oral tradition of natives freeing wild bulls and wolves in Roman camps in order to create chaos. At an individual level, it was essentially unanimous in the Iberian Peninsula to prefer death before captivity, disarmament and slavery. As a last resource, warriors would carry a phial containing poison extracted from either hemlock or ranunculus, which they would use to commit suicide if captured. The second poison had also a psychological effect on their enemies, as the user would suffer a postmortem contraction of the facial muscles (sardonicism) and would make it look like the dead warrior was laughing at them. Through less exotic means, it was also common seeking death by attacking their captors, or killing each other while imprisoned.

=== Warrior women ===
As with other Celtic peoples, there are numerous chronicles indicating a strong presence of warrior women in ancient Hispania. While making incursions through Lusitania, Decimus Junius Brutus found female fighters defending their cities among the men, "with such bravery that they uttered no cry even in the midst of slaughter." This custom was also recorded about the Bracari, whose women would fight against Brutus "never turning, never never showing their backs, or uttering a cry." They would prefer death to captivity, even killing their own children before killing themselves. Gallaeci were also described as going to war along with their wives.

In an outstanding chapter cited by Polienus and Plutarch, Salmantine women assisted to break the siege of their city against the Carthaginian army. The citizens surrendered and exited Salmantica, but the women did so while carrying swords hidden in their clothes. Once the Punics were distracted with the sacking, the women armed the men and themselves and attacked, taking the Punics by surprise and killing many. The natives managed to retreat to the mountains, and this impressed Hannibal so much that he gave them immunity and humane treatment. Iberian women also assisted in non-combatant roles in the defense of Illiturgis against Scipio Africanus's army.

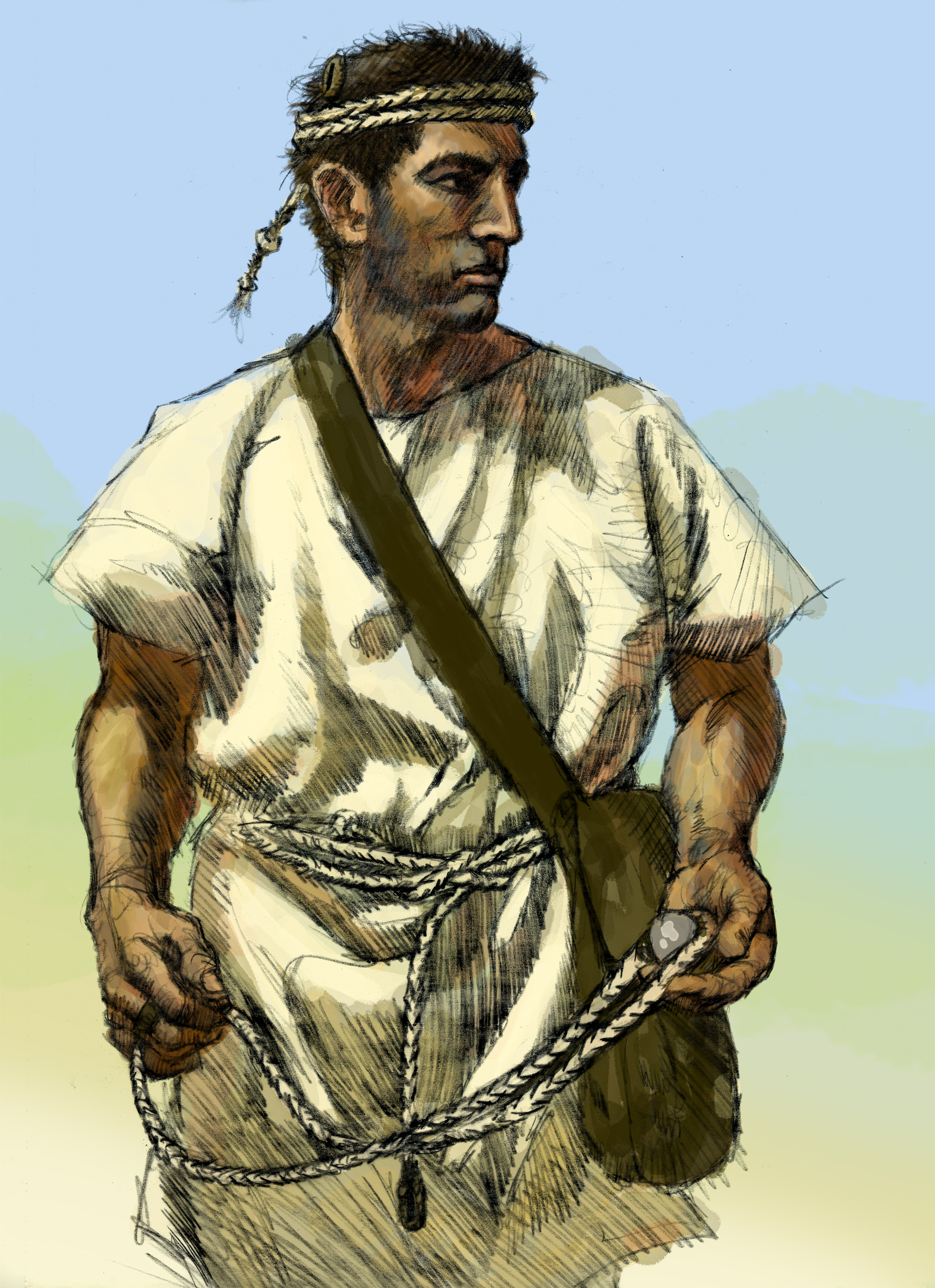
A Balearic slinger.

=== As mercenaries ===
Mercenary life is recorded as a custom of Iron Age Hispania, particularly in the central area of the Iberian Peninsula. Departing from the native tribe and applying to serve in others was a way for economically disadvantaged youth to escape poverty and find an opportunity to use their fighting skills. Soldiers would not work individually, but in small-sized units formed by friends and relatives, managed by their own chiefs and keeping their cultural traits. Starting from the 5th century BC, mercenary life would become a social phenom in Hispania, with high numbers of fighters from distant lands coming to join the armies of Carthage, Rome, Sicily, and even Greece, as well as other Hispanic peoples. They are repeatedly described by authors like Strabo and Thucydides as being among the best fighting forces in the Mediterranean area, as well as, according to Livy, the most battle hardened unit in the Carthaginian military. Polybius also cites them as the reason for Hannibal's victory in several battles during the Second Punic War. He would strategically use their particular talents, arranging Balearic slingers as skirmishers, Celtiberian horsemen as heavy cavalry, and Lusitanians as mountain troops, among others.

=== As Roman soldiers ===
Even before the end of the conquest of Hispania, Roman armies started drafting native auxilia among their allied tribes, valuing them for the same reasons they had been coveted as mercenaries. After complete Romanization of the peninsula, Hispania became the main source of military manpower for Rome other than Italy itself, with military service replacing mercenary work as the main way out for Hispanics to achieve prosperity and martial glory. Hispanics (Hispanorum) stood out particularly during the mandates of Julius Caesar and Augustus, for whom they served as bodyguards, and peaked in the campaigns of Trajan and Hadrian, who were raised in Hispania themselves. The peninsula only ceded its place in the Roman military machine with the Migration Period in the 3rd century, after which Germanic peoples progressively outnumbered them in the imperial army.

== Fortifications ==
Peninsular fortified settlements, either castra or oppida, had a limited participation in Hispanic warfare. Given that the latter was mostly tribal in nature, raids were performed in order to sack and plunder, only rarely in order to capture and maintain territory. An inferior quarreling faction, unable to best the other on the battlefield, would seek refuge in their walls and endure the sacking of their outdoors properties, enjoying the safety that their enemies would not probably even try to assault the place. Formal siege warfare and machinery only arrived with the Carthaginian and Roman armies.

== War leaders of Hispania ==
- Viriathus, Punicus, Caesarus, Caucenus, Curius and Apuleius of the Lusitanians
- Corocotta and Larus of the Cantabrians
- Tanginus and Olyndicus of the Celtiberians
- Indibilis and Mandonius of the Ilergetes
