= Labarum =

Roman military standard displaying XP for Christ

The Labarum of Constantine I, reconstructed from the depiction on a follis minted c. 337. The three dots represent "medallions" which are said to have shown portraits of Constantine and his sons.

The labarum (Byzantine Greek: λάβαρον or λάβουρον) was a vexillum (military standard) that displayed the "Chi-Rho" symbol ☧, a christogram formed from the first two Greek letters of the word "Christ" (Byzantine Greek: ΧΡΙΣΤΟΣ, or Χριστός) – Chi (χ) and Rho (ρ). It was first used by the Roman emperor Constantine the Great.

Ancient sources draw an unambiguous distinction between the two terms labarum and Chi-Rho, even though later usage sometimes regards the two as synonyms. The name labarum was applied both to the original standard used by Constantine the Great and to the many standards produced in imitation of it in the Late Antique world, and subsequently.

== Etymology ==
Beyond its derivation from Latin labarum, the etymology of the word is unclear. The Oxford English Dictionary offers no further derivation from within Latin. Some derive it from Latin labare 'to totter, to waver' (in the sense of the "waving" of a flag in the breeze) or laureum [vexillum] ("laurel standard"). An origin as a loan into Latin from a Celtic language or Basque has also been postulated. There is a traditional Basque symbol called the lauburu, which was proposed by Juan Cortés Osorio in the 17th century to be the origin of the labarum; the motif occurs in engravings dating as early as the 2nd century AD.

Harry Thurston Peck, in his Harpers Dictionary of Classical Antiquities, wrote: "The etymology of the term itself has given rise to many conflicting opinions. Some derive the name from labor; others from εὐλάβεια, 'reverence'; others from λαμβάνειν, 'to take'; and others, again, from λάφυρα, 'spoils'. One writer makes Labarum to be like S.P.Q.R., only a notatio, or combination of initials to represent an equal number of terms; and thus, L.A.B.A.R.V.M. will stand for Legionum aquila Byzantium antiqua Roma urbe mutavit."

== History ==
=== Vision of Constantine ===
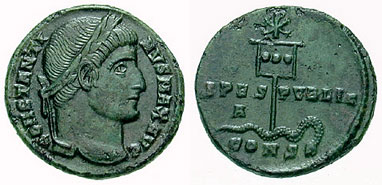
A follis of Constantine (c. 337) showing a depiction of his labarum spearing a serpent on the reverse; the inscription reads SPES PVBLICA

On the evening of October 27, 312 AD, with his army preparing for the Battle of the Milvian Bridge, the emperor Constantine I claimed to have had a vision which led him to believe he was fighting under the protection of the Christian God.

Lactantius states that in the night before the battle Constantine was commanded in a dream to "delineate the heavenly sign on the shields of his soldiers". Obeying this command, "he marked on their shields the letter X, with a perpendicular line drawn through it and turned round thus at the top, being the cipher of Christ". Having had their shields marked in this fashion, Constantine's troops readied themselves for battle.

From Eusebius, two accounts of a battle survive. The first, shorter one in the Ecclesiastical History leaves no doubt that God helped Constantine but does not mention any vision. In his later Life of Constantine, Eusebius gives a detailed account of a vision and stresses that he had heard the story from the emperor himself. According to this version, Constantine with his army was marching somewhere (Eusebius does not specify the actual location of the event, but it clearly is not in the camp at Rome) when he looked up to the sun and saw a cross of light above it, and with it the Greek words Ἐν Τούτῳ Νίκα. The traditionally employed Latin translation of the Greek is in hoc signo vinces— literally "In this sign, you will conquer." However, a direct translation from the original Greek text of Eusebius into English gives the phrase "By this, conquer!"

At first he was unsure of the meaning of the apparition, but the following night he had a dream in which Christ explained to him that he should use the sign against his enemies. Eusebius then continues to describe the labarum, the military standard used by Constantine in his later wars against Licinius, showing the Chi Rho sign.

Those two accounts have been merged in popular notion into Constantine seeing the Chi-Rho sign on the evening before the battle. Both authors agree that the sign was not readily understandable as denoting Christ, which corresponds with the fact that there is no certain evidence of the use of the letters chi and rho as a Christian sign before Constantine. Its first appearance is on a Constantinian silver coin from c. 317, which proves that Constantine did use the sign at that time. He made extensive use of the Chi-Rho and the labarum later in the conflict with Licinius.

=== Possible origins ===
The 1919 Dictionnaire des Antiquités Grecques et Romaines speculates the symbol actually had an either Hispanic or Gaul origin, possibly originating in the banner known as the Cantabrum, adopted from the Hispanics in the Roman army. Historian Jean Jacques Hatt also proposed it originated in the Celtic symbols of Taranis, found by Constantine in Gaul and also used by Roman auxiliars from the Hispanic Varduli tribe.

The vision has been interpreted in a solar context (e.g., as a sun dog phenomenon), which would have been reshaped to fit with the Christian beliefs of the later Constantine.

An alternate explanation of the intersecting celestial symbol has been advanced by George Latura, which claims that Plato's visible god in Timaeus is in fact the intersection of the Milky Way and the zodiacal light, a rare apparition important to pagan beliefs that Christian bishops reinvented as a Christian symbol.

== Eusebius' description of the labarum ==
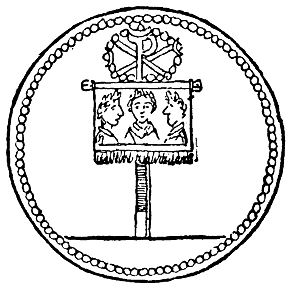
Constantine's labarum, with a wreathed Chi Rho from an antique silver medal

"A Description of the Standard of the Cross, which the Romans now call the Labarum." "Now it was made in the following manner. A long spear, overlaid with gold, formed the figure of the cross by means of a transverse bar laid over it. On the top of the whole was fixed a wreath of gold and precious stones; and within this, the symbol of the Saviour’s name, two letters indicating the name of Christ by means of its initial characters, the letter P being intersected by X in its centre: and these letters the emperor was in the habit of wearing on his helmet at a later period. From the cross-bar of the spear was suspended a cloth, a royal piece, covered with a profuse embroidery of most brilliant precious stones; and which, being also richly interlaced with gold, presented an indescribable degree of beauty to the beholder. This banner was of a square form, and the upright staff, whose lower section was of great length, of the pious emperor and his children on its upper part, beneath the trophy of the cross, and immediately above the embroidered banner."

"The emperor constantly made use of this sign of salvation as a safeguard against every adverse and hostile power, and commanded that others similar to it should be carried at the head of all his armies."

== Iconographic career under Constantine ==
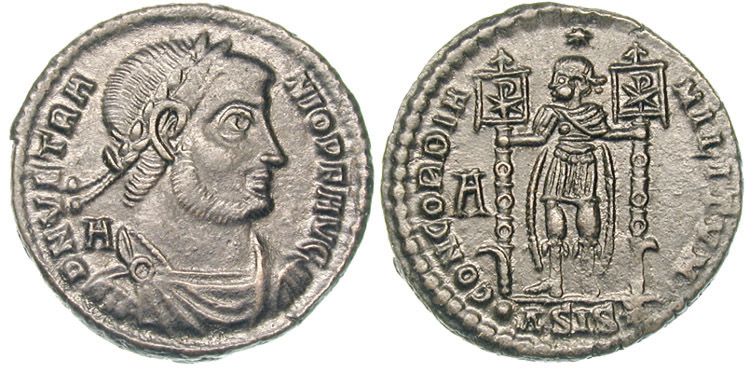
Coin of Vetranio, a soldier is holding two labara. Notably, they differ from the labarum of Constantine in having the Chi-Rho depicted on the cloth rather than above it, and in having their staves decorated with phalerae as were earlier Roman military unit standards.

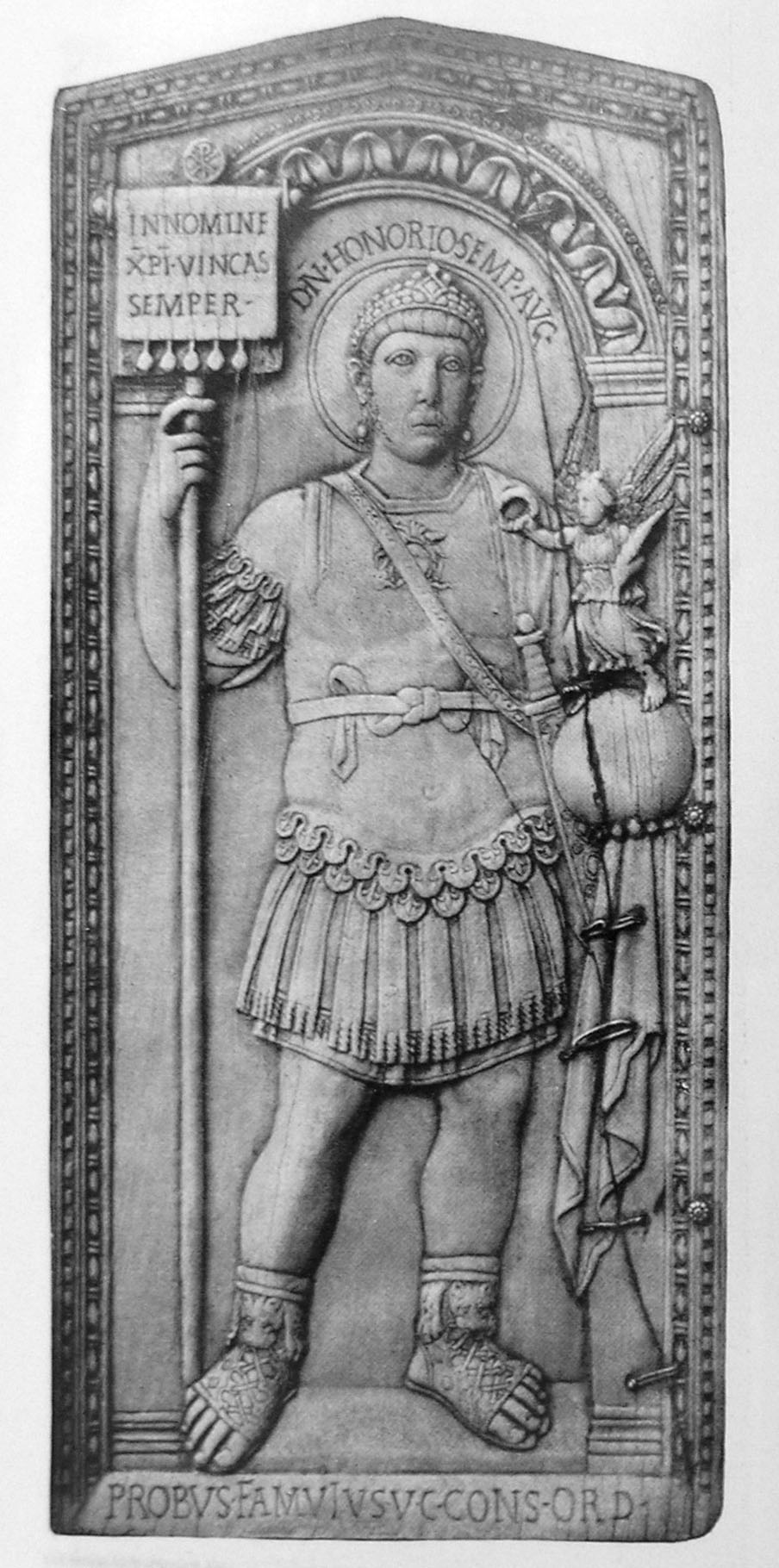
The emperor Honorius holding a variant of the labarum - the Latin phrase on the cloth means "In the name of Christ [rendered by the Greek letters XPI] be ever victorious."

The labarum does not appear on any of several standards depicted on the Arch of Constantine, which was erected just three years after the battle. If Eusebius' oath-confirmed account of Constantine's vision and the role it played in his victory and conversion can be trusted, then a grand opportunity for the kind of political propaganda that the Arch was built to present was missed. Many historians have argued that in the early years after the battle, the Emperor had not yet decided to give clear public support to Christianity, whether from a lack of personal faith or because of fear of religious friction. The arch's inscription does say that the Emperor had saved the res publica INSTINCTV DIVINITATIS MENTIS MAGNITVDINE ("by greatness of mind and by instinct [or impulse] of divinity"). Continuing the iconography of his predecessors, Constantine's coinage at the time was inscribed with solar symbolism, interpreted as representing Sol Invictus (the Unconquered Sun), Helios, Apollo, or Mithras, but in 325 and thereafter the coinage ceases to be explicitly pagan, and Sol Invictus disappears. And although Eusebius' Historia Ecclesiae further reports that Constantine had a statue of himself "holding the sign of the Savior [the cross] in his right hand" erected after his victorious entry into Rome, there are no other reports to confirm such a monument.

Historians still dispute whether Constantine was the first Christian Emperor to support a peaceful transition to Christianity during his rule, or an undecided pagan believer until middle age, and also how strongly influenced he was in his political-religious decisions by his Christian mother St. Helena.

As for the labarum itself, there is little evidence for its use before 317. In the course of Constantine's second war against Licinius in 324, the latter developed a superstitious dread of Constantine's standard. During the attack of Constantine's troops at the Battle of Adrianople the guard of the labarum standard were directed to move it to any part of the field where his soldiers seemed to be faltering. The appearance of this talismanic object appeared to embolden Constantine's troops and dismay those of Licinius. At the final battle of the war, the Battle of Chrysopolis, Licinius, though prominently displaying the images of Rome's pagan pantheon on his own battle line, forbade his troops from actively attacking the labarum, or even looking at it directly.

According to Charles M. Odahl, Constantine felt that both Licinius and Arius were agents of Satan, and associated them with the serpent described in the Book of Revelation (12:9). However, the Emperor's deathbed baptism by the Arian Bishop Eusebius of Nicomedia complicates this claim. Constantine represented Licinius as a snake on his coins.

Eusebius stated that in addition to the singular labarum of Constantine, other similar standards (labara) were issued to the Roman army. This is confirmed by the two labara depicted being held by a soldier on a coin of Vetranio (illustrated) dating from 350.

== Later usage ==
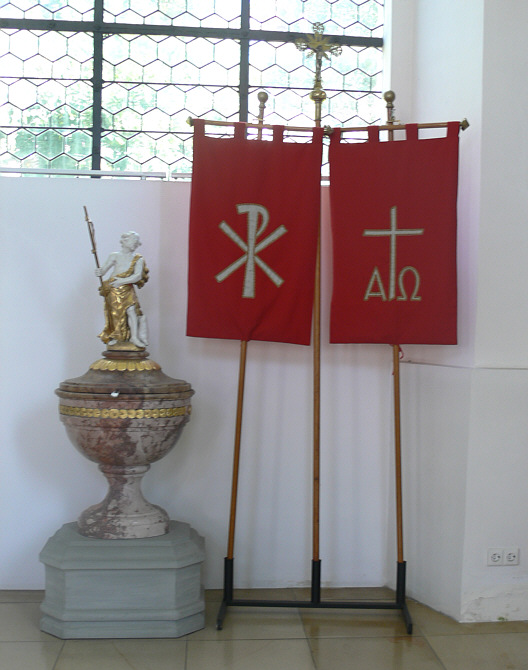
Modern ecclesiastical labara (Southern Germany).

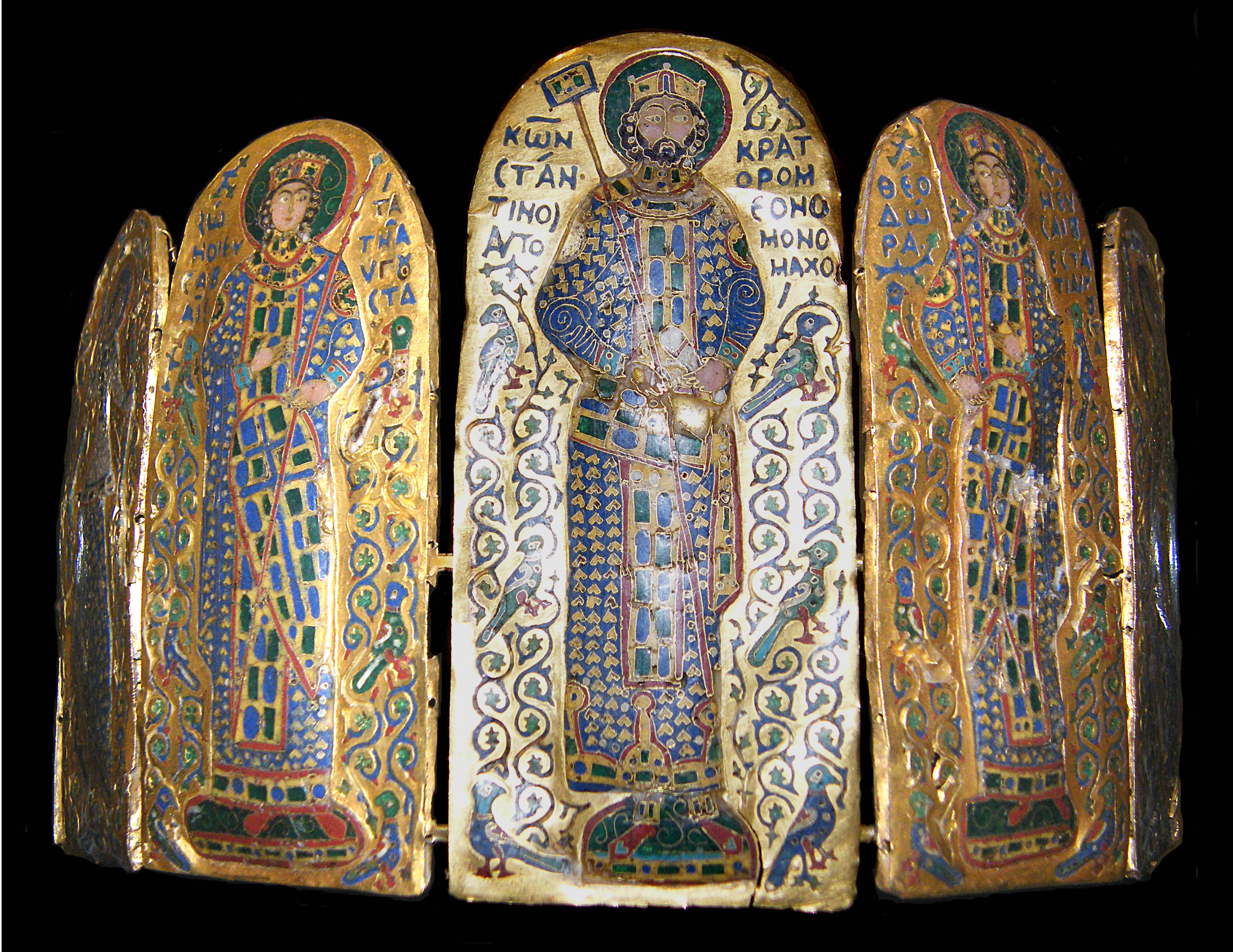
The emperor Constantine IX Monomachos (centre panel of a Byzantine enamelled crown) holding a miniature labarum

A later Byzantine manuscript indicates that a jewelled labarum standard believed to have been that of Constantine was preserved for centuries, as an object of great veneration, in the imperial treasury at Constantinople. The labarum, with minor variations in its form, was widely used by the Christian Roman emperors who followed Constantine.

A miniature version of the labarum became part of the imperial regalia of Byzantine rulers, who were often depicted carrying it in their right hands.

The term "labarum" can be generally applied to any ecclesiastical banner, such as those carried in religious processions.

"The Holy Lavaro" were a set of early national Greek flags, blessed by the Greek Orthodox Church. Under these banners the Greeks united throughout the Greek Revolution (1821), a war of liberation waged against the Ottoman Empire.

Labarum also gives its name (Labaro) to a suburb of Rome adjacent to Prima Porta, one of the sites where the 'Vision of Constantine' is placed by tradition.

== See also ==
- Gonfalone
- Christian symbolism
- Constantine I and Christianity
- Cantabrian Labarum
- Arch of Constantine, triumphal arch to the victory at Milvian Bridge.
- Christianity
- Constantinian shift
- Khorugv
- Michaelion
- XI monogram
- Biertan Donarium

== Bibliography ==
- Grabar, Christian Iconography: A Study of its Origins (Princeton University Press) 1968:165ff
- Grant, Michael (1993), The Emperor Constantine, London. ISBN 0-7538-0528-6
- R. Grosse, "Labarum", Realencyclopädie der klassischen Altertumswissenschaft vol. 12, pt 1(Stuttgart) 1924:240-42.
- H. Grégoire, "L'étymologie de 'Labarum'" Byzantion 4 (1929:477–82).
- J. Harries (2012) Imperial Rome AD 284 to 363, Ch. 5: The Victory of Constantine, AD 311–37, Edinburgh University Press.
- Kazhdan, Alexander, ed. (1991), Oxford Dictionary of Byzantium, Oxford University Press, p. 1167, ISBN 978-0-19-504652-6
- A. Lipinsky, "Labarum" Lexikon der christlichen Ikonographie 3 (Rome:1970)
- Lieu, S.N.C and Montserrat, D. (Ed.s) (1996), From Constantine to Julian, London. ISBN 0-415-09336-8
- Odahl, C.M., (2004) Constantine and the Christian Empire, Routledge 2004. ISBN 0-415-17485-6
- Peralta Labrador, Eduardo (2003). Los cántabros antes de Roma. Real Academia de la Historia. ISBN 9788489512597.
- Smith, J.H., (1971) Constantine the Great, Hamilton, ISBN 0-684-12391-6
- Stephenson, P., (2009) Constantine: Unconquered Emperor, Christian Victor, Quercus, London.
