= Coat of arms of Cantabria =

Versions
- Escutcheon-only
- Armiger: Cantabria
- Adopted: 1985
- Crest: Spanish Royal Crown
- Shield: Party en fess: 1 azure, a tower or, to its right a ship in natural colours that has broken a chain sable. At the base, waves argent and azure, in chief two male heads, severed and haloed; 2 gules, a disc-shaped stele with geometric ornaments.

The coat of arms of Cantabria has a rectangular shield, round in base (also called Spanish shield in heraldry) and the field is party en fess. In field azure, a tower or crenellated and masoned, port and windows azure, to its right a ship in natural colours that with its bow has broken a chain sable going from the tower to the dexter flank of the shield. At the base, sea waves argent and azure, all surmounted in chief by two male heads, severed and haloed. In field gules, a disc-shaped stele with geometric ornaments of the kind of the Cantabrian steles of Barros or Lombera. The crest is a closed royal crown, a circle of jeweled gold, made up of eight rosettes in the shape of acanthus leaves, only five visible, interpolated with pearls, and with half-arches topped with pearls raising from each leaf and converging in an orb azure, with submeridian and equator or, topped with cross or. The crown, covered in gules.

The coat of arms was designed by a commission of experts made up of members of the Royal Academy of History. After long debates they decided to have two differentiated parts: one historical and hagiographic, and the other characteristical.

The historic part of the first field shows the emblem of the conquest of Seville by Cantabrian marines in 1248, with the tower (representing the Torre del Oro) and the ship breaking the chain boom that blocked the way through the river Guadalquivir. It symbolizes the eight centuries of activity that characterised the maritime Cantabria. The hagiographic references consist in the heads of the martyr saints Emeterius and Celedonius, representing the unity of the territory under their patronage.

The second field shows the image of one of the most important legates left by the primitive people who inhabited the region: the giant steles of the Cantabri. The Stele of Barros (discovered in the town of the same name) was taken as model. The official coat of arms of Cantabria completes with the inclusion of the Spanish royal crown.

== See also ==
- Flag of Cantabria
- The Lábaru, or Cantabrian Labarum.
