= Zurita, Cantabria =

Zurita
- Locality
- Location in Spain
- Coordinates: 43°20′55″N 3°59′16″W
- Country: Spain
- Autonomous community: Cantabria
- Province: Cantabria
- Comarca: Santander Bay
- Municipio: Piélagos
- Judicial district: Santander
- Elevation: 54 m (177 ft)

Population (2015)
  - Total: 905
- Time zone: UTC+1 (CET)
  - Summer (DST): UTC+2 (CEST)
- Postal code: 39479

Zurita is a village in the municipality of Piélagos in Cantabria, Spain. The elevation of this town is 54 meters (177 feet) above sea level, and it is located 5 kilometers (3.1 miles) from the municipal capital, Renedo de Piélagos; 21 km (13 miles) from the capital of the province, Santander, and 7 km (4.3 miles) from the second largest city in the community, Torrelavega. In 2015 it had a population of 905 inhabitants (INE).

== Heritage ==
Among its sights are two palaces, the Llana and the Rueda, as well as two seventeenth century churches, San Julián and San Martín. The stele of Zurita, which is the emblem of the Town Hall of Piélagos, was found here; a Cantabrian stele, it represents a rider, his horse, a squire, and below them a soldier who is being devoured by a vulture.

The town of Zurita also features an eighteenth century flour mill, although at one time it had at least one more.
