= Cantabrian circle =

Military tactic

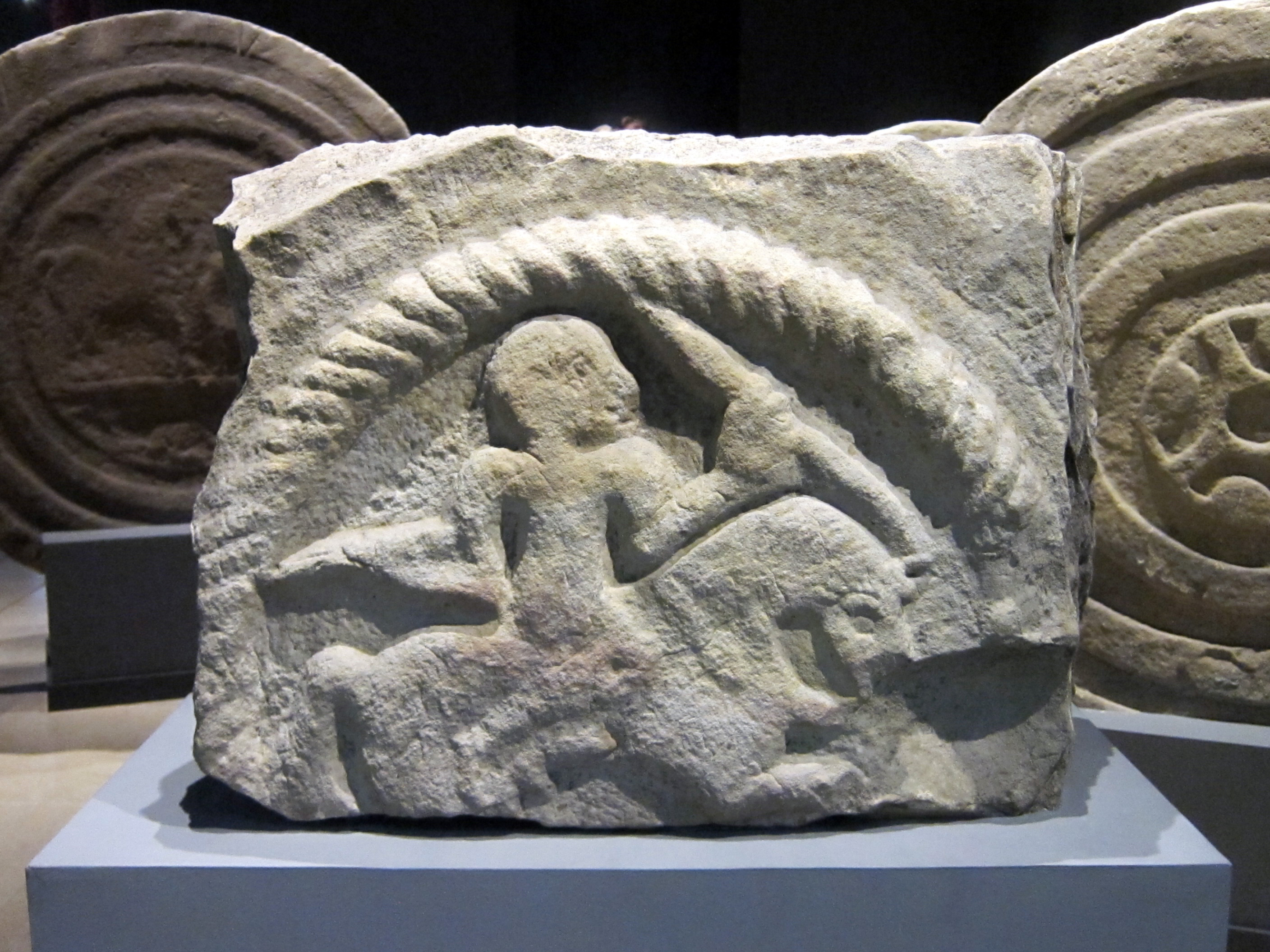
Cantabrian horseman armed on horseback belonging to a fragment of the stela of San Vicente de Toranzo discovered in the hillfort of Espina del Gallego.

The Cantabrian circle (Latin: circulus cantabricus) was a military tactic born in the warfare in the ancient Iberian Peninsula. It was employed by ancient and to a lesser extent medieval light cavalry armed with javelins or bows. As Flavius Arrianus and Hadrian relate, this was the most habitual form to appear in combat of the Cantabri tribes, and Rome adopted it after the Cantabrian Wars.

== Description ==
A group of mounted javelineers and/or archers would form a single-file rotating circle. As the attackers came around to face the enemy formation, they would let their missiles fly. The effect was a continuous stream of javelins and arrows onto an enemy formation.

The tactic was usually employed against infantry, including archers, arbalists, peltasts, and slingers. The constant movement of the horsemen gave them an advantage against the less mobile infantry and made them harder to target by the enemy's missile troops. The manoeuvre was designed to harass and taunt the enemy forces, disrupt close formations, and often draw part, or all, of the enemy forces into a disorganised or premature charge. This was commonly used against enemy infantry, especially heavily armed and armoured slow moving forces such as the legions of the late Roman Republic and early Roman Empire.

The advantage of the Cantabrian circle is that the mounted javelineers and/or archers do not have to make a perfect circle, allowing them to keep their distance from the enemy. The slower moving infantry have little to no hope of catching the cavalry, putting them at a distinct disadvantage.

The Cantabrian circle is similar to other cavalry manoeuvres such as the caracole and the Parthian shot.
