= Cohors I Asturum et Callaecorum =

The Cohors I Asturum et Callaecorum (civium Romanorum) (1st cohort of the Asturians and Callaecans) was a Roman auxiliary unit.

== Description ==
The soldiers of the cohort were recruited from the Asturians and Callaecans in the territory of today's Asturias and Galicia.

The soldiers of the unit had been granted Roman citizenship at a certain time. However, this did not apply to soldiers who were taken into the unit after this time. They received the Roman citizenship only with their honorable discharge (honesta missio) after 25 years of service.

Since there are no inscriptions of milliaria (1000 men) and equitata, so it is to be assumed that it is a pure infantry cohort (Cohors peditata). The target strength of the unit was 480 men, consisting of six centuria with 80 men each.

== History ==
The first proof of unity in the province of Mauretania Tingitana is based on an inscription found in Volubilis, dated AD 57 (ILM 00058). Possibly, the cohort was around 60 temporarily in the province of Illyricum

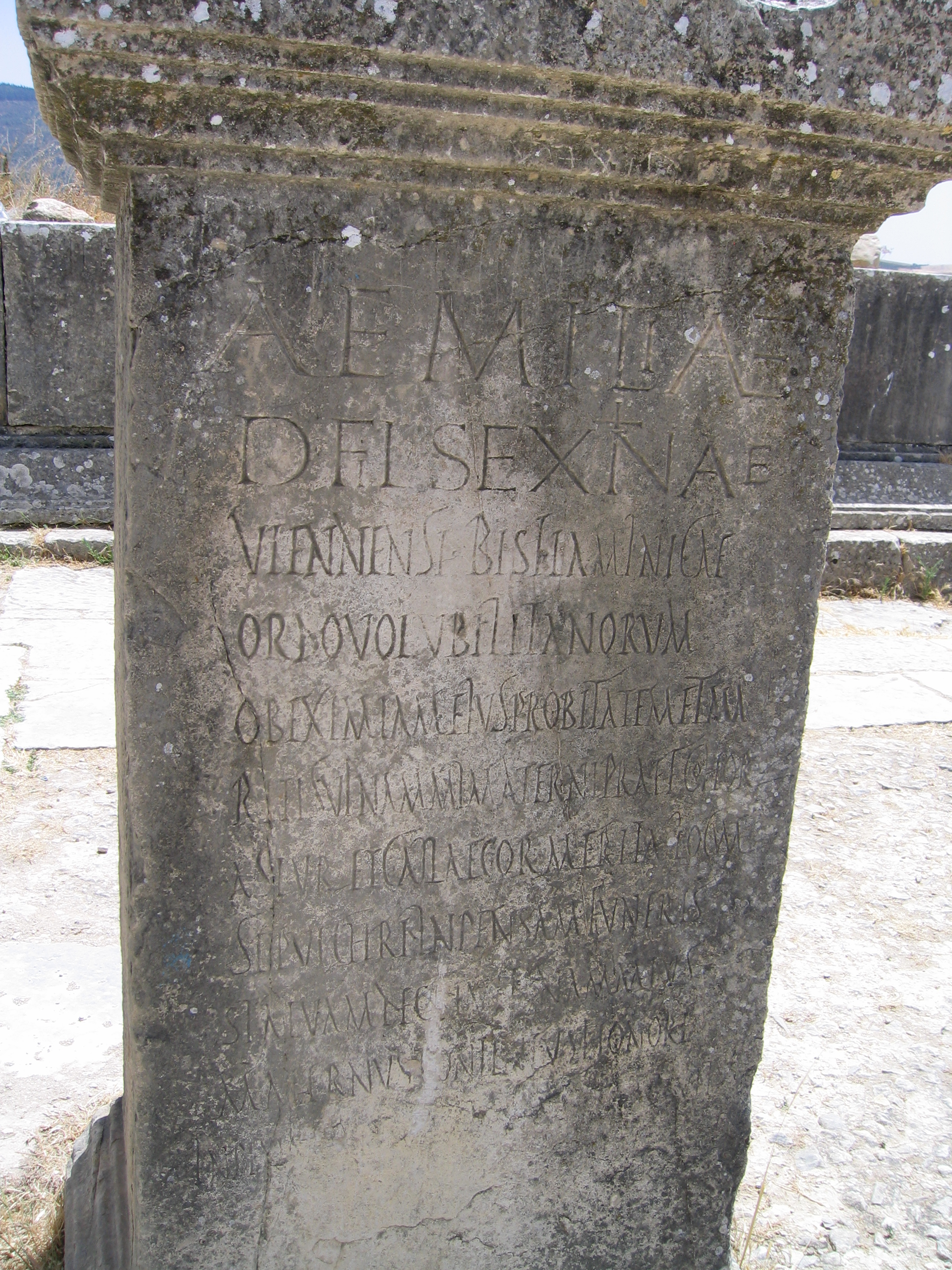
Volubilis socle.

Locations of the cohort in Mauretania Tingitana were:

- Ain Schkour: Several inscriptions indicate the presence (of parts) of the cohort in Ain Schkour. John Spaul assumes that the unit was stationed in Ain Shkour.
- Volubilis: Prefect Nammius Maternus' tombstone was found in Volubilis

== Known commanders ==
Commanders included

- Aemilius
- Caius Vibius Salutaris (CIL 3, 6065)
- Flavius (oder C. Iul.) Neon (CIL 8, 21820)
- Gaius Iulius Longinus (AE 1955, 208)
- Lucius Domitius Dentonianus (CIL 2, 4211)
- Nammius Maternus (AE 1916, 91, CIL 16, 167)
- Publius Valerius Priscus (CIL 6, 3654)

== See also ==
- Cohors II Asturum et Callaecorum
- List of Roman auxiliary regiments
