= Assegai =

Wooden African javelin pointed with iron or fire-hardened tip

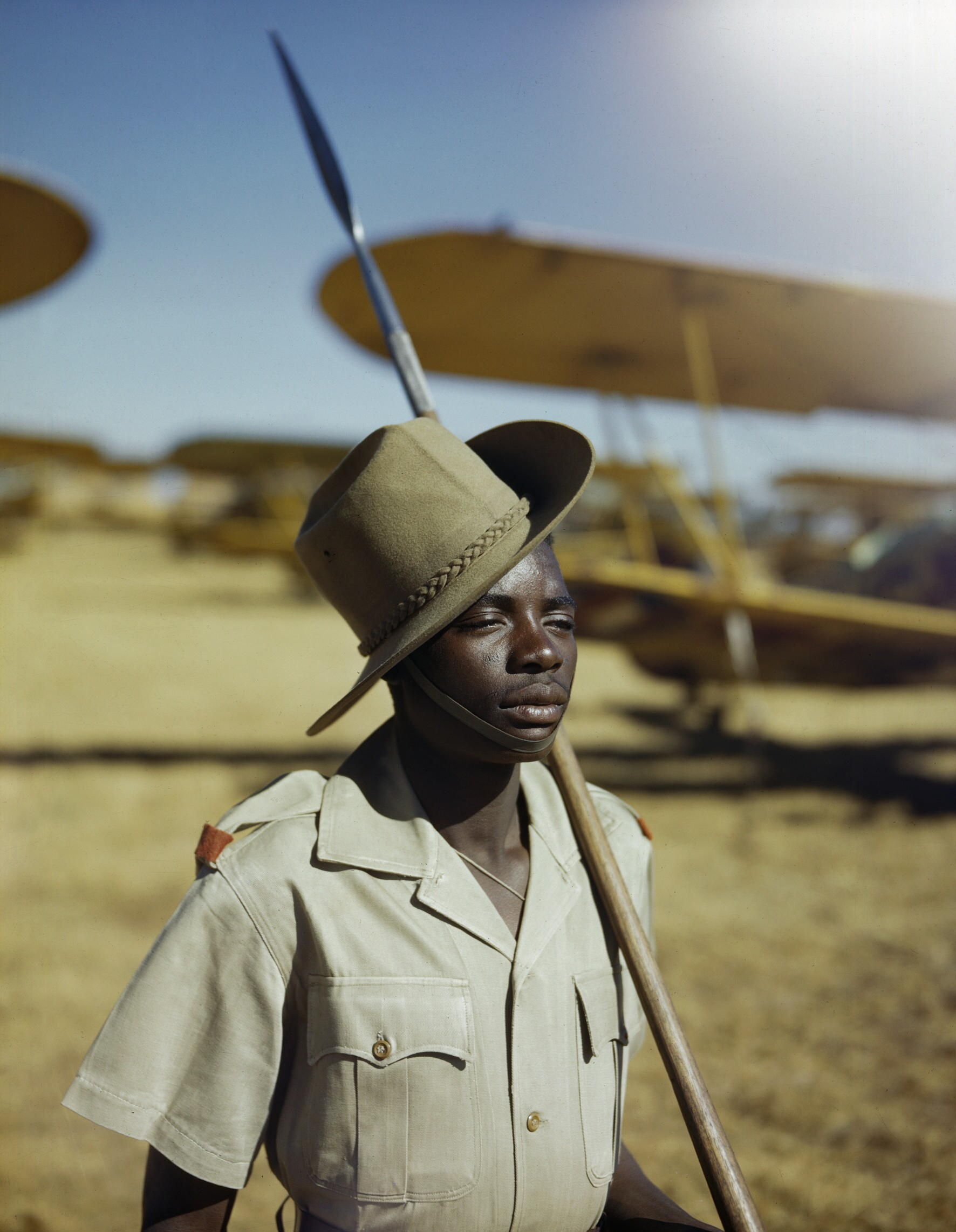
An askari guard at an Allied air training school at AFB Waterkloof, Pretoria, South Africa, January 1943

An assegai or assagai (Note: originally Berber languages: zaġāya, lit. 'spear'; Arabic: زغاية, romanized: zaġāya; Old French: azagaie; Spanish: azagaya; Italian: zagaglia; Middle English: lancegay)) is a polearm used for throwing, usually a light spear or javelin made up of a wooden handle with an iron tip.

== Area of use ==
The use of various types of the assegai was widespread all over Africa and it was the most common weapon used before the introduction of firearms. The Zulu, Xhosa, and other Nguni tribes of South Africa were renowned for their use of the assegai.

== Iklwa ==
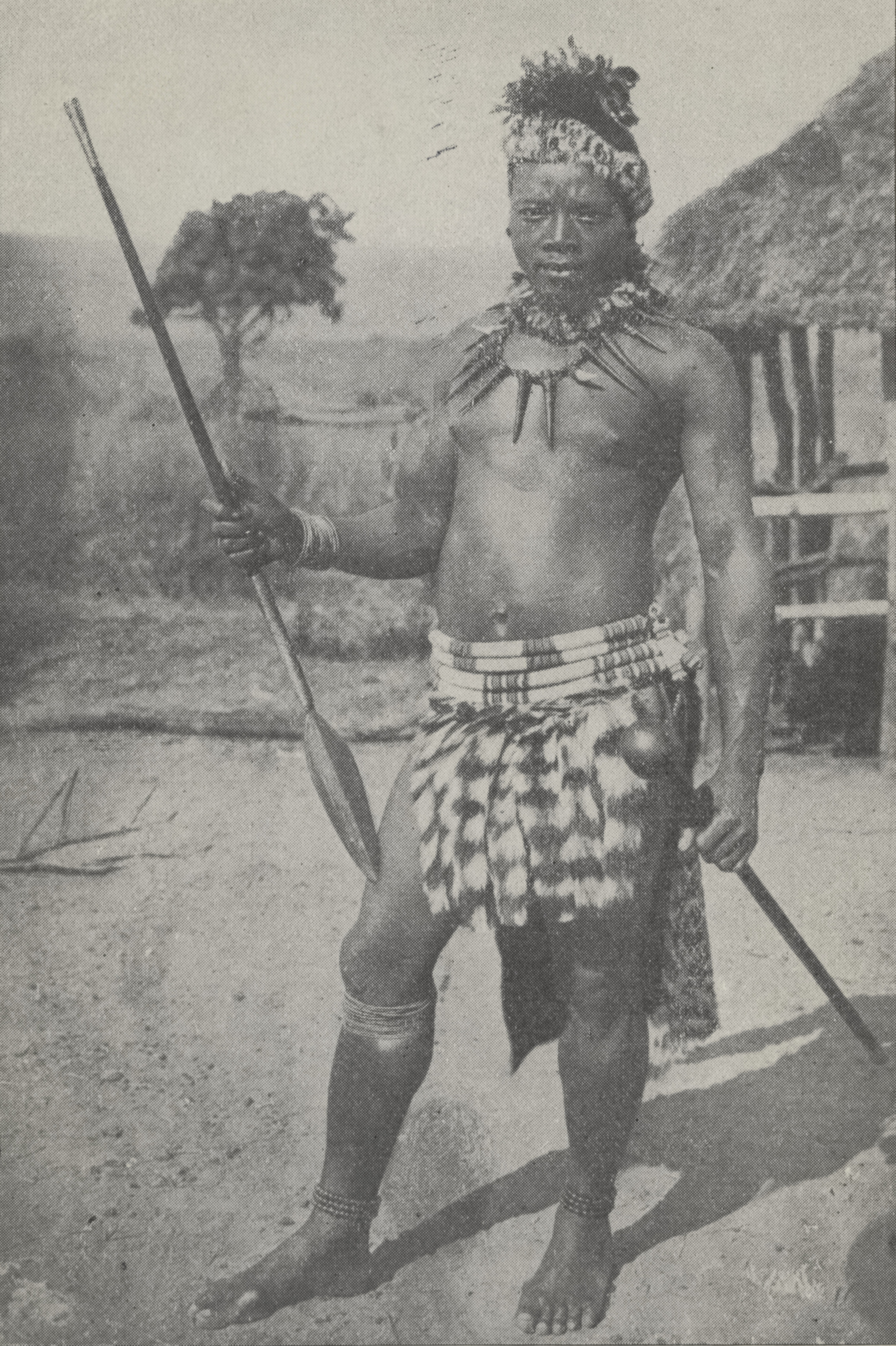
Zulu man with the shorter iklwa

Dingiswayo, ruler of his Zulu tribe, whose chief lieutenant was Shaka, popularized the use of the shorter stabbing spear with a 610 mm (24 in) shaft and a larger, broader blade 300 mm (12 in) long in warfare, which was traditionally used primarily as a hunting spear. This weapon is otherwise known as the iklwa or ixwa, after the sound that was heard as it was withdrawn from the victim's wound. The traditional spear was not abandoned, but was thrown from range at enemy formations before closing in for close quarters battle with the iklwa. This weapon was typically used with one hand while the off-hand held a cowhide shield for protection.

== Botany ==
It is also the name of a southern African tree (Curtisia dentata) whose wood was suitable for making spears or lances, most notably by the Bantu-speaking people of southern Africa.

== See also ==
- Soliferrum
- Rarabe kaPhalo
- Falarica
- Pilum
- Battle of Amalinde
- Almogavars
- Shaka's military reforms
- Assegai Tree, Curtisia dentata
