= Cohors II Asturum et Callaecorum =

The Cohors II Asturum et Callaecorum [equitata] was a Roman auxiliary unit. It is known from military diplomats and brickwork.

== Components ==
- Asturum et Callaecorum : [the] Asturer and Callaecer. The soldiers of the cohort were recruited from the Asturians and Callaecans in the territory of today's Asturias and Galicia.
- Equitata : partially. The unit was a mixed bandage of infantry and cavalry. The addition does not appear explicitly in any of the military diplomats, but 2 military diplomats were exhibited for riders of the cohort.

There are no references to the milliaria (1000 men), so it is assumed that the unit was a Cohors equitata. The target strength of the cohort was 600 men (480 man infantry and 120 riders) consisting of 6 centuria infantry with 80 men and 4 turmae cavalry each with 30 riders.

== History ==
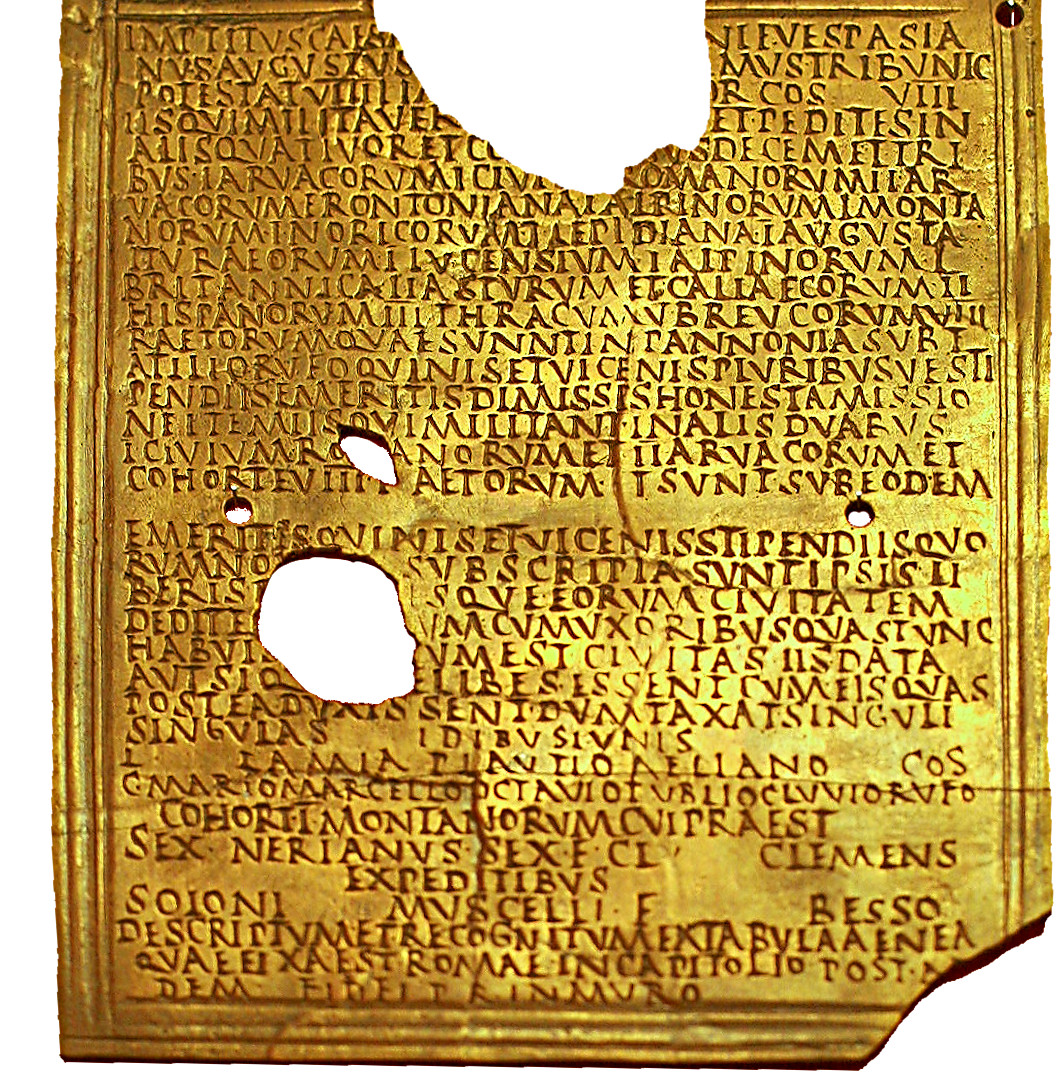
Roman military diploma Carnuntum.

The first record of the unit was in the province of Pannonia in a military diploma dating back to AD 80. In the diploma, the cohort is listed as part of the troops stationed in Pannonia.

== Locations ==
Locations of the cohort in Pannonia and Pannonia inferior may have been:

- Ad Militare (Batina): Brick finds with the stamp COH II AST indicate the presence (of parts) of the cohort in Ad Militare or the surrounding areas (CIL 3, 10674). John Spaul refers to Barnabás Lőrincz regarding the order of the camps in which the unit was stationed.
- Ad Statuas : Here the unit was [possibly] stationed in Lugio together with Cohors VII Breucorum.
- Surduk : Brick finds indicate the presence (of parts) of the cohort in Surduk or the surrounding area.

== Members of the cohort ==
The following members of the cohort are known:

=== Commanders ===
- Granianus is known from the military diploma of 145. He was in the rank of a prefect.

=== Others ===
- Dasentis, a horseman (AE 1996, 1257)
- Entis, a horseman (CIL 13, 7037)
