= Caetra =

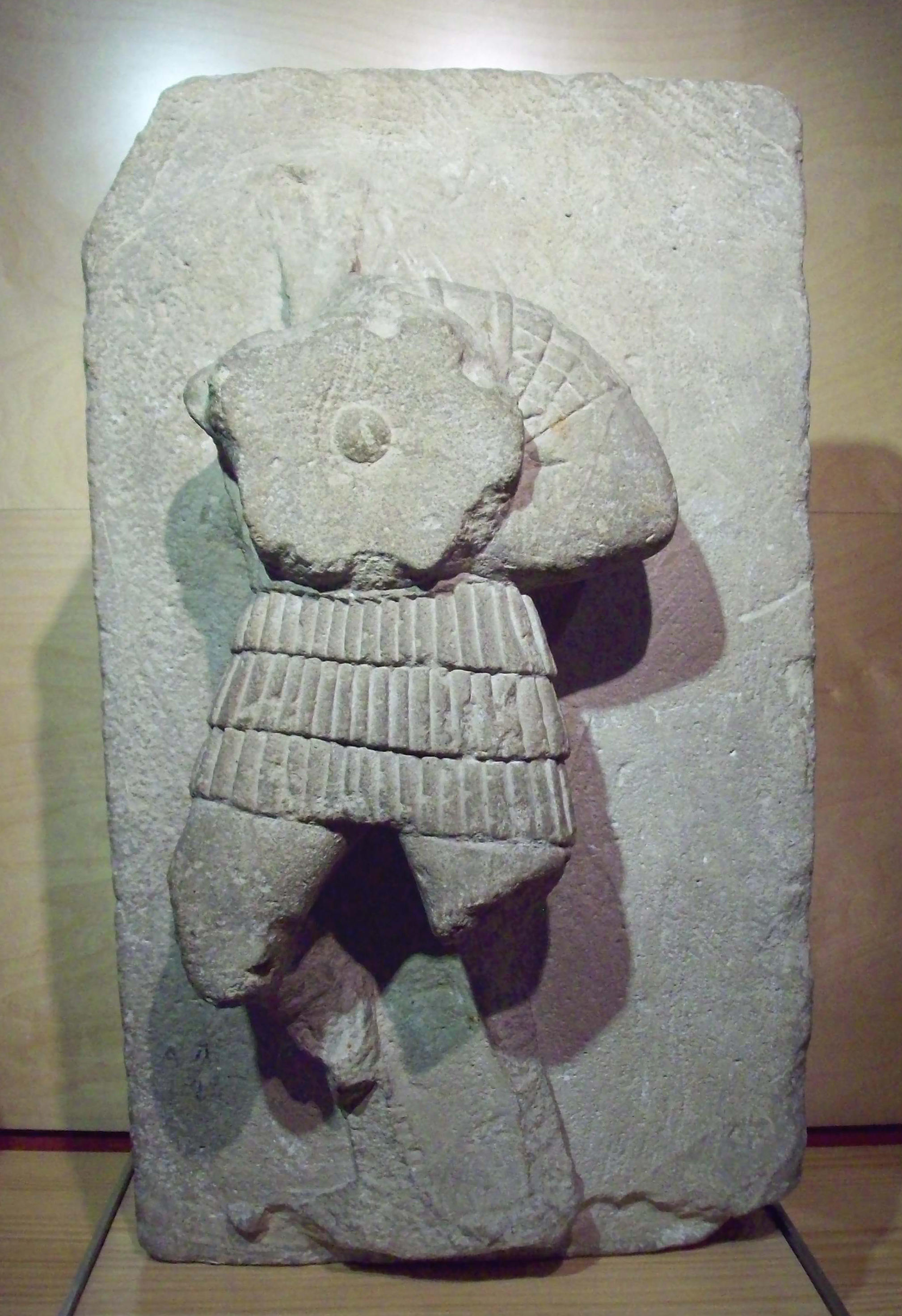
- High relief from Osuna (Seville, Spain) showing an Iberian warrior with caetra (2nd or 1st Century BC)
- Type: Shield
- Place of origin: Iberian Peninsula as Caetra

Service history
- In service: Classical antiquity
- Used by: Lusitanians, Celtberians, Gallaecian, Celts and Iberians
- Wars: Punic Wars, Celtiberian Wars, Lusitanian War and Sertorian War

Specifications
- Mass: 3–5 kg (6.6–11.0 lb)
- Width: 30–90 cm (12–35 in)

Caetra was the shield used by Iberian, Celtiberian, Gallaecian and Lusitanian warriors. The shield was circular shaped with a diameter between 30 cm to 90 cm. It was tied to the warrior's body with ropes or leather strips that passed over the shoulder and that gave great mobility to fight both on foot and on horseback. The shapes and decorations of the shields had variations in their metal, wood or leather protection. Warriors that carried this shield were usually light infantry called caetratus (pl. Caetrati).

== Description ==
This 30 to 90 cm (1ft to 3ft) diameter light round shield was constructed from wood sections attached by two metal bars of bronze, copper or iron; it was then covered with leather. Although the caetra was commonly round, it took on many shapes and sizes. Size varied from 90 cm (3ft) to perhaps 30 cm (1ft) in diameter. All shields had metal fittings and ornaments on the face with an iron boss in the middle, added to deflect sword blows as well as arrows and spears. In combat, the shield was not only effective at blocking, but was also an extremely proficient secondary weapon. Iberian troops used the boss to punch opponents. On the move these compact bucklers could be hung on a belt or across the back by a strap, so as not to be burdensome to the soldier on the march or foraging for food, but still handy for when the enemy was close. Cavalrymen would usually carry the caetra so as to not over encumber their mounts or limit their horsemanship.

== See also ==
- Lusitanian War
- Military history of ancient Rome
- Punic Wars
- Celtiberian Wars
