= Cantabrian stelae =

Ancient Iberian monuments

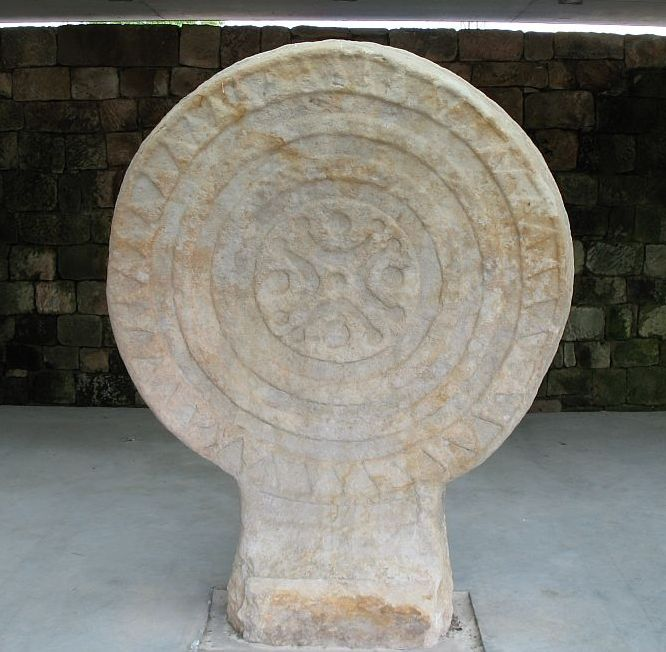
Cantabrian stele of Barros (Cantabria). Carved in sandstone and over a pier base, its dimensions are 1.70 m in diameter and 0.32 m thick.

The coat of arms of Cantabria shows in field gules, a disc-shaped stele with geometric ornaments of the kind of the Cantabrian stelae of Barros or Lombera.

The Lábaru is a modern interpretation of an ancient military standard called Cantabrum and based in the design of the Barros Cantabrian Stelae.

The Cantabrian stelae are monolithic stone disks of different sizes, whose early precedents were carved in the last centuries before the romanization of Cantabria in northern Iberian Peninsula. Cantabrian stelae include swastikas, triskeles, crosses, spirals, helixes, warriors or pre-Roman funerary representations among their usual ornamentation. The most famous is called Estela de Barros (Barros Stele) which can be visited in the Parque de las Estelas (Stelae Park) in the town of Barros, in Los Corrales de Buelna. This stele is part of the current coat of arms of Cantabria and the meaning of tetraskelion would be related to solar worship. The Barros stele giant size represents the main difference to the smaller stelae found in other parts of northern Spain. In addition to the Estela de Barros, we can see another larger, fragmented stele in the Parque de las Estelas.

Other found stelae are exhibited in the Regional Museum of Prehistory and Archaeology of Cantabria in Santander. There are two stelae found in Lombera, another found in Zurita, showing the iconographic decoration of a vulture pouncing on a fallen warrior, and another from near the Cantabrian castrum of Espina del Gallego. In turn, fragments of other Cantabrian stelae have been found, like the third of Lombera and the Stele of San Vicente de Toranzo, where on one side is depicted a cantabrian warrior on horseback, along with other smaller.

The Cantabrian stelae are the most important testimony of the Cantabri pre-Roman people and one of the most representative symbols of Cantabria today, being still used in Cantabria during the Middle Ages and even during the Baroque, like the old ones, but losing partly the discoid shape and replacing the solar motives with crosses. The medieval and modern discoid stelae were also typical of other regions of northern Spain. Numerous examples were found in the Basque Country, and several in Navarra, as well as in Cantabria.

== Current impact ==
A modern interpretation of these stelae and the Roman flag, Cantabrum, gives rise to the current Cantabrian lábaru, an unofficial flag but widely used among Cantabrian people. In the same way, stonemasons and artists from many parts of Cantabria reproduce ancient stelae or create new ones like those, carved in stone or wood, sometimes used as ornaments for new constructions. Similarly stelae reproductions, in wood or metal, are commonly found in pendants and small figures, all of which give an idea of the importance as a Cantabrian symbol.

== Cantabrian stelae of Roman and pre-Roman times ==
Although the ancient Cantabri people produced many stelae, the best known are the giant stelae, of which five are known, four of them having been discovered in the valley of Buelna. They are usually dated from the 1st century B.C. to 1st century A.D., although there are differences between them, and some could even be 5th or 6th century B.C.

Giant Cantabrian stelae Over 1.5 m. diameter
Name	Diameter (cm)	Period	Place of discovery
Estela de Barros 1	166	3rd century AD	Barros
Estela de Barros 2	200		Barros
Estela de Lombera 1	170		Los Corrales de Buelna
Estela de Lombera 2	170		Los Corrales de Buelna
Estela de Zurita	200	1st century BC - 1st century AD	Zurita

Other important Cantabrian stelae
Name	Diameter (cm)	Period	Place of discovery
Estela de Lombera 3	130		Los Corrales de Buelna
Estela de Luriezo	136	1st century AD	Luriezo
Estela de Toranzo			Espina del Gallego
