= Cantabrian labarum =

A flag of Cantabria, northern Spain

- Lábaru
- Use: Civil and state flag
- Proportion: Not defined
- Adopted: March 15, 2016 (Note: Support for the flag was voted and approved by the Comillas Town Council on July 21, 2006. Fluttered for the first time in a public building in Comillas town hall, Cantabria.)
- Design: Purple cloth on which there is what would be called in heraldry a "saltire voided" made up of curved lines, with knobs at the end of each line.

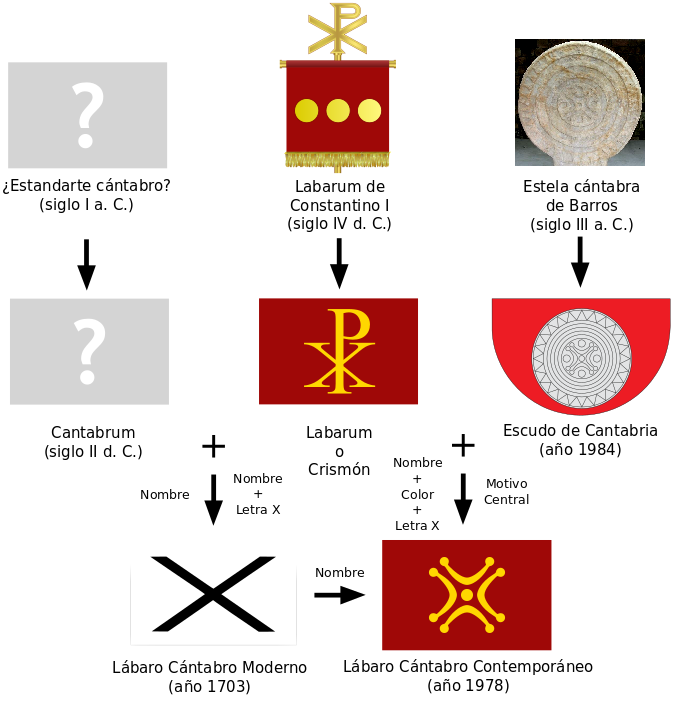
Cantabrian labarum genesis

The Cantabrian labarum (Cantabrian: lábaru cántabru or Spanish: lábaro cántabro) is a modern interpretation of the ancient military standard known by the Romans as Cantabrum. It consists of a purple cloth on which there is what would be called in heraldry a "saltire voided" made up of curved lines, with knobs at the end of each line.

The name and design of the flag is in the theory advocated by several authors of a relationship between the genesis of labarum and the military standard called Cantabrum, thereby identifying both as a same thing; and the alleged relationship the Codex Theodosianus established between the Labarum and the Cantabrarii, the school of Roman soldiers in charge of carrying the Cantabrum.

Additionally, and according to the definition of the Royal Academy of the Spanish language, labarum is the Roman standard (as in military ceremonial flag) on which, under Emperor Constantine's rule, the cross and the Monogram of Christ (Chi-Rho) was drawn. By association of ideas, labarum can refer just to the monogram itself, or even just the cross.

Etymologically, the word comes from (p)lab- which means to speak in a number of Celtic languages, many of which have derivatives. For example, in Welsh llafar means "speech", "language", "voice". Ancient Cornish and Breton have lavar, "word", and ancient Irish has labrad: "language", "speech".

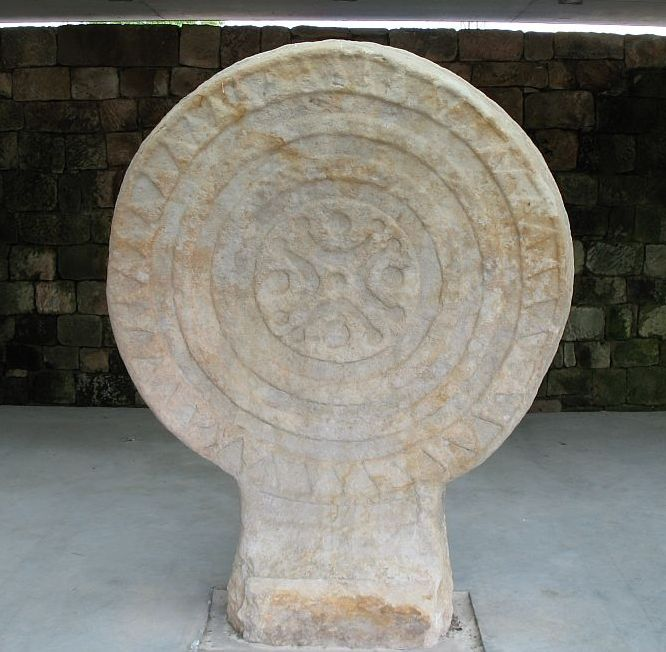
Cantabrian stele of Barros, Cantabria from around the 2nd century BC. Carved in sandstone and over a pier base, its dimensions are 1.70 m in diameter and 0.32 m thick.

== Legal status ==
The plenary session of the Parliament of Cantabria, at its meeting of March 14 2016, approved a resolution as a result of the processing of the non-legislative proposal No. 9L/4300-0056 relative to the recognition of the Lábaro.

"The Parliament of Cantabria:

1. Recognizes the lábaro as a representative and identity symbol of the Cantabrian people and the values they represent.

2. Urges the institutions and civil society of Cantabria to actively promote and participate in their knowledge and dissemination as an iconographic expression of the identity of the Cantabrian people. Keeping the official character of the flag of the Community of Cantabria and the rest of the institutional symbols of Cantabria."

== See also ==
- Labarum
- Lauburu
- Fasces
- Labrys
- Christian symbolism
- Christogram
