= Cantabrum =

Cantabri banner name

Cantabrum is the name given by the Roman Empire to the banner used by the Cantabri to facilitate war tactics of the cavalry.

After the Cantabrian Wars and the subjugation of the Cantabri by Rome (19 BC), Roman legions adopted cantabrum as they did with the symbols of the people they conquered as a sign of victory. These standards would henceforth be carried by the so-called cantabrarii of the Roman cavalry. Emperor Theodosius II, 400 years after the Cantabrian Wars, still called its bearer the cantabrarius.

There is nowadays a contemporary interpretation of cantabrum called Cantabrian labarum, recognized by the Parliament of Cantabria as a representative symbol of the identity of the Cantabrian people and the values they hold.

== See also ==
- Flag of Cantabria
