= Flag of Cantabria =

Cantabria
- Use: Civil and state flag
- Proportion: 2:3
- Adopted: 30 December 1981
- Design: Two horizontal bands of same width, white on top, red on the bottom

The flag of the Spanish region of Cantabria is made up of two horizontal stripes of equal width, white on the top and red on the bottom, and the region's coat of arms in its centre. The design is established in the text of the Autonomy Statute, except for the coat of arms, which was established by a Law of the Regional Assembly approved on 30 December 1981. The design traces its lineage to the ship registration flag of the maritime province of Santander, assigned by Royal Order on 30 July 1845.

In 2016, the Parliament of Cantabria also recognized the Cantabrian labarum as a symbol of the Cantabrian people, urging the institutions and civil society of Cantabria to promote its use. Most townships have already accepted the proposition of using said flag placing it on the balcony of the Town Hall.

Cantabrian labarum or lábaru cántabru.

== See also ==
- Coat of arms of Cantabria
- The Lábaru, or Cantabrian Labarum.
