= Falarica =

Ancient Iberian ranged polearm

Falarica, also phalarica, was an ancient Iberian ranged polearm that was sometimes used as an incendiary weapon.

== Design ==
The falarica was a heavy javelin with a long, thin iron head of about 900 mm (35 in) in length attached to a wooden shaft of about equal length. The iron head had a narrow sharp tip, which made the falarica an excellent armour-piercing weapon.

The Iberians used to bind combustible material to the metal shaft of the weapon and use the falarica as an incendiary projectile. The incendiary javelin would hit the shields or siege works of the enemy often setting them ablaze.

The falarica could also be launched by the use of spear throwers or siege engines to increase its range and velocity.

the besieged were protected and the enemy kept away from the gates by the falarica, which many arms at once were wont to poise... when hurled like a thunderbolt from the topmost walls of the citadel, it clove the furrowed air with a flickering flame, even as a fiery meteor speeding from heaven to earth dazzles men's eyes with its blood red tail... and when in flight it struck the side of a huge tower, it kindled a fire which burnt until all of the woodwork of the tower was utterly consumed.

== Etymology ==
Falarica comes from either ancient Greek phalòs (φαλòς), because it came out of a phala (an ancient round tower posted on cities' walls and was used to fire the falaricae), or from phalēròs (φαληρòς) "shining" as it was enwrapped with blazing fire.

== Origin ==
Although in some texts the term falarica is used as a poetic description for a Roman weapon, its origin seems to be from the Western Mediterranean and in most respects it was similar to the pre-Marian pilum. There are references to its use when the Iberians fought against the Carthaginian invasions. There are remains of falaricae amongst Iberian and Celtiberian archaeological deposits from the 3rd century BC to the 1st century AD.

== See also ==
- Javelin
- Soliferrum
- Assegai
- Falcata
- Pilum
