= Soliferrum =

Javelin used in ancient Iberia

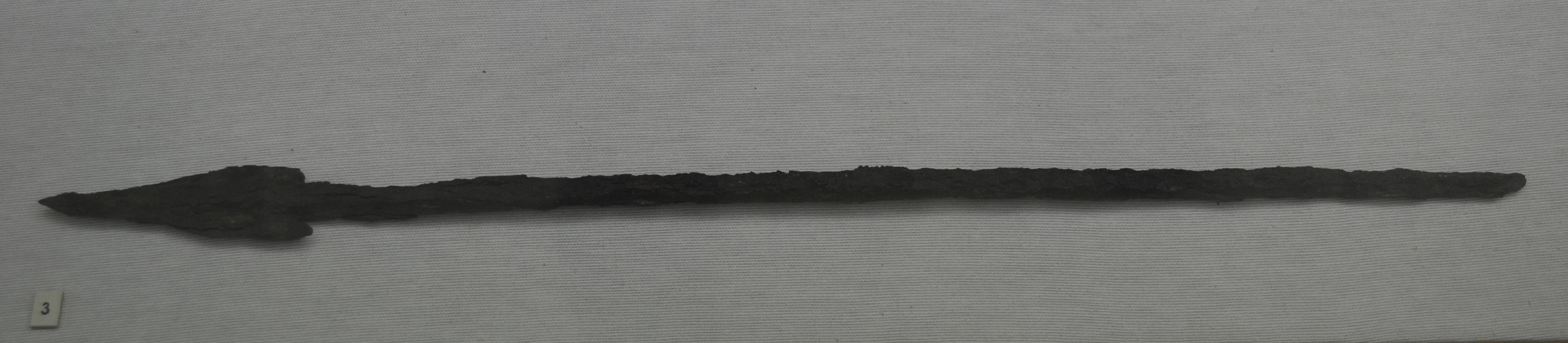
Iberian soliferreum from the Bastida de les Alcusses. Prehistory Museum of Valencia

Soliferrum or Soliferreum (Latin: solus, "only" and ferrum, "iron") was the Roman name for an ancient Iberian ranged polearm made entirely of iron. The soliferrum was a heavy hand-thrown javelin, designed to be thrown to a distance of up to 30 meters.

== Design ==
The soliferrum was forged from a single piece of iron which usually measured 1.5–2 m (4 ft 11 in – 6 ft 7 in) in length and around 1 cm (0.39 in) in diameter. This missile weapon had a narrow, barbed tip so it could pierce shields and armour. The tip of the soliferrum came in several forms. In its simplest form, it had only a sharpened tip but usually it had two small spikes or even more. These spikes had one or several hooks, so the weapon would be hard to extract after it had penetrated an enemy's body. The central part of the soliferrum was usually thickened to facilitate the grip of the weapon. Sometimes there were moldings of about 10 cm (3.9 in) long in the middle of the weapon to further improve the grip and thus prevent the weapon from slipping in sweaty or bloody hands.

== Advantages ==
The soliferrum was an extremely effective heavy javelin. The weight and the density of the weapon's iron shaft, its small diameter and its narrow tip gave the soliferrum excellent armor-piercing capacity at close range and enabled it to penetrate even heavy shields.

== Usage ==
Ancient Iberian warriors were heavy users of javelins, casting this ranged weapon by volleys in order to disorganize an enemy formation before advancing to close combat with mêlée weapons. The Iberian warrior was typically buried with his soliferrum and all his other weapons.

== Origin ==
Archeological findings suggest that the soliferrum first appeared in the regions of Aquitania and Languedoc, north of the Pyrenees, during the 1st millennium BC. From there, the weapon was brought to the Iberian Peninsula by migrating Celts and it was in Iberia that the soliferrum achieved its fame. The soliferrum remained in use in the Iberian peninsula under Roman rule until the end of the 3rd century and it coexisted with the falarica (the Iberian pilum).

== See also ==
- Javelin
- Falarica
- Assegai
- Falcata
- Pilum
