= Port of Santander =

Bay of Santander, Cantabrian Sea

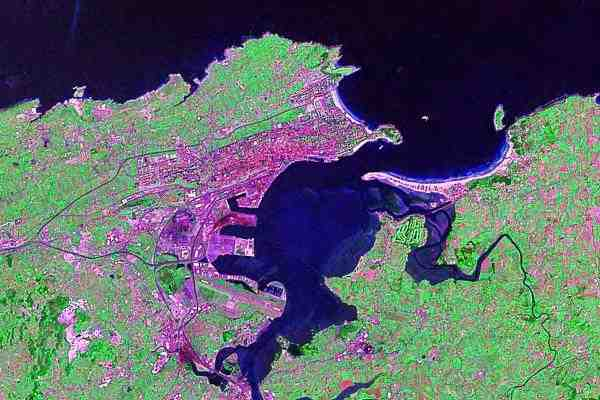
- View of the Bay of Santander, the rectangular shapes of the port can be seen.
- Interactive map of Port of Santander

Location
- Country: Spain
- Location: Santander, Cantabria

Details
- Opened: 26 b.C.
- Operated by: Ports of the State
- Type of Harbor: Port
- Scope: International
- Activities: Cargo, passenger, sports.

Statistics
- Website www.puertosantander.es

Flag of the maritime province of Santander to which it belongs.

The Port of Santander, Cantabria (Spain), is located in the Cantabrian Sea, specifically in the Bay of Santander, in the municipalities of Santander, Camargo and Marina de Cudeyo. It is managed by the Port Authority of Santander, whose current president is Francisco Martín Gallego, under the public entity Ports of the State and in turn administered by the Ministry of Transport, Mobility and Urban Agenda. It belongs to the maritime province of Santander (ST). Santander District (ST-4).

== History ==
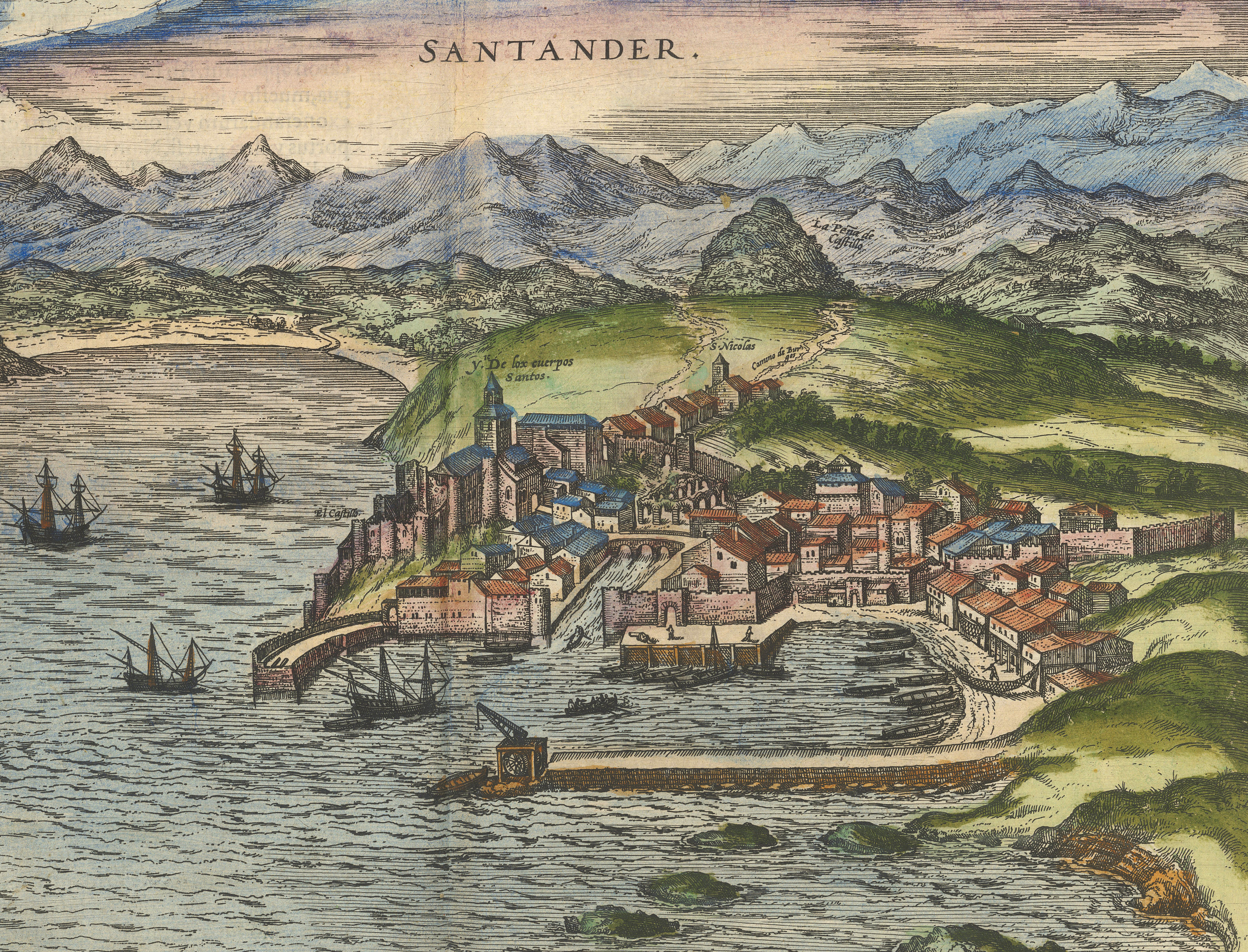
Santander as seen by Joris Hoefnagel at the end of the 16th century. This engraving is the oldest existing image of the city.

The history of Santander and its port are closely linked from the beginning, since the construction of the port led to the growth of the original population center around it. The port of Santander has also promoted the development of the city, being today one of the most important economic engines of Cantabria. The special link between the port and the city has been evident since the 50s in urban planning, as the City of Santander seeks port land without current use to undertake major projects.

=== Portus Victoriae Iuliobrigensium ===
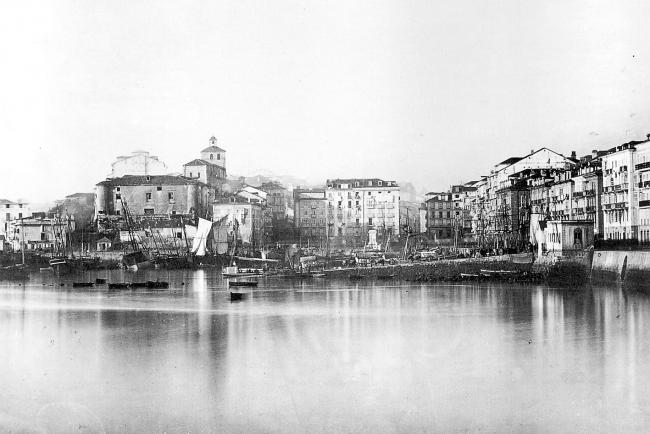
The port of Santander with the Martillo dock in the foreground and the Naos dock on the left, in front of the Castle, 1867 (photo by J. Laurent).

At the end of the Cantabrian Wars, specifically in 19 B.C., the Romans founded the port of Portus Victoriae, which some authors identify with Santander and others with Santoña. Thanks to the protection of the bay, the location of this new city and port was unmatched. Initially, the main activity of the port, and the reason for its construction, was the export of minerals to other parts of the Empire.

=== Middle and Modern Ages ===
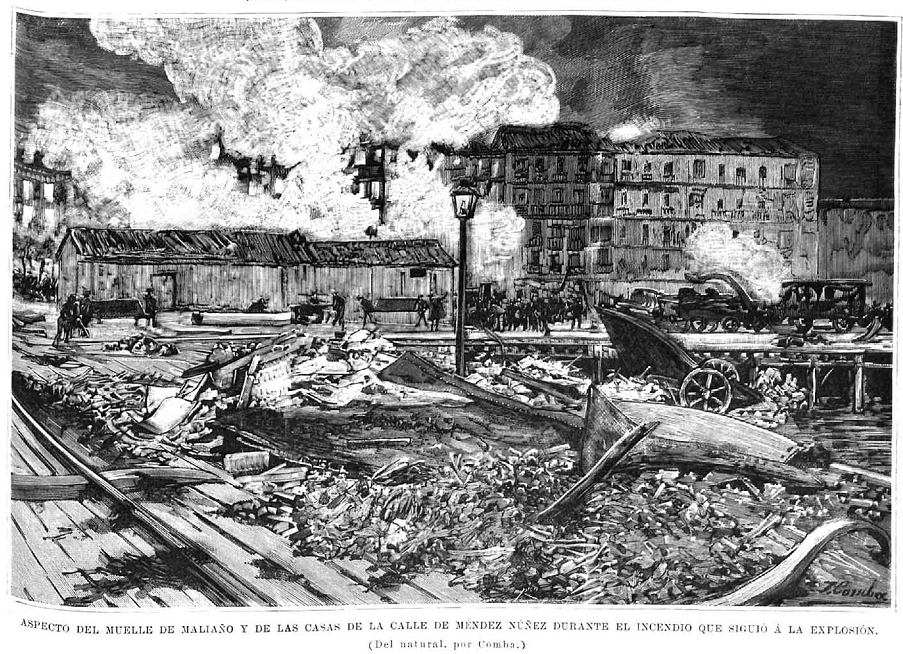
Aspect of the pier of Maliaño and the houses of the street of Méndez Núñez during the fire that followed the explosion of Cabo Machichaco, in La Ilustración Española y Americana, November 1893, drawing by Juan Comba.

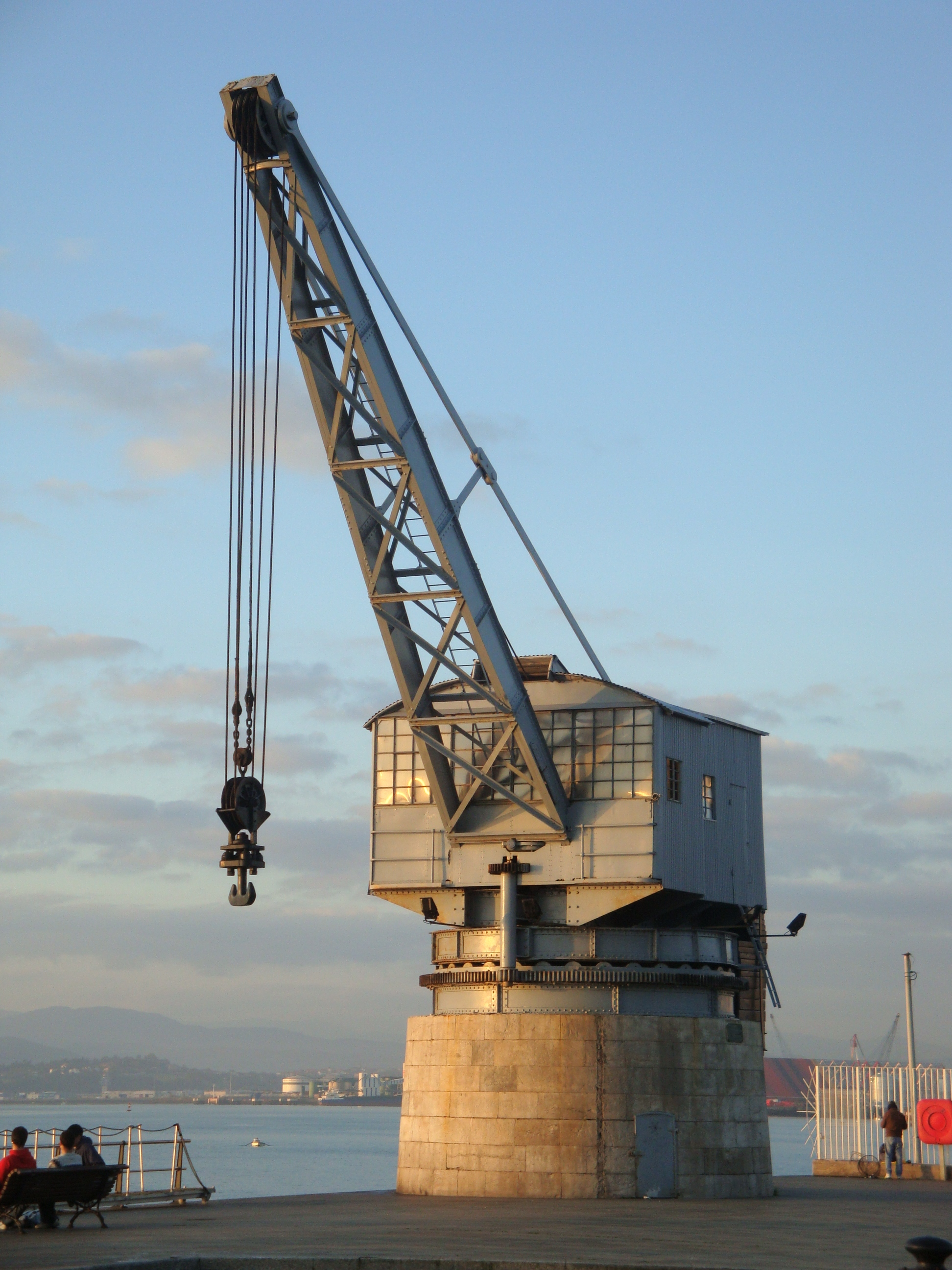
The Stone Crane, industrial relic of the Port of Santander and symbol of the city.

In 1296 the Hermandad de las Marismas was formed, of which Santander is a part.

In 1494 the Consulate of Burgos was created, which later allowed wool traffic in the port of Santander, positively affecting the local economy.

In the 16th century, Santander was one of the fundamental ports for the Navy of Castile and for the trade of the Kingdom of Castile. In 1570, King Philip II declared the port a naval base for the Cantabrian Sea. In 1639, the Royal Shipyard of Guarnizo (Real Astillero de Guarnizo) was founded, the seed of what is now Astander, in the current municipality of El Astillero.

=== Trade with the New World ===
In 1765 the Royal Decree of Free Trade was enacted, allowing Santander to trade with the Spanish colonies in the New World. Twenty years later, in 1785, the Consulate of Santander was created. Thanks to these two measures, colonial trade increased and the city prospered until it became one of the most important port cities.

In 1801, the maritime province of Santander was created.

In 1893, the steamship Cabo Machichaco, docked at the Maliaño dock in the port of Santander, exploded. Its cargo, composed of dynamite and sulfuric acid, burned for hours before exploding.

With the loss of the last colonies, the port lost its main resource, a fact that was felt in the economy of the city.

=== 20th century ===
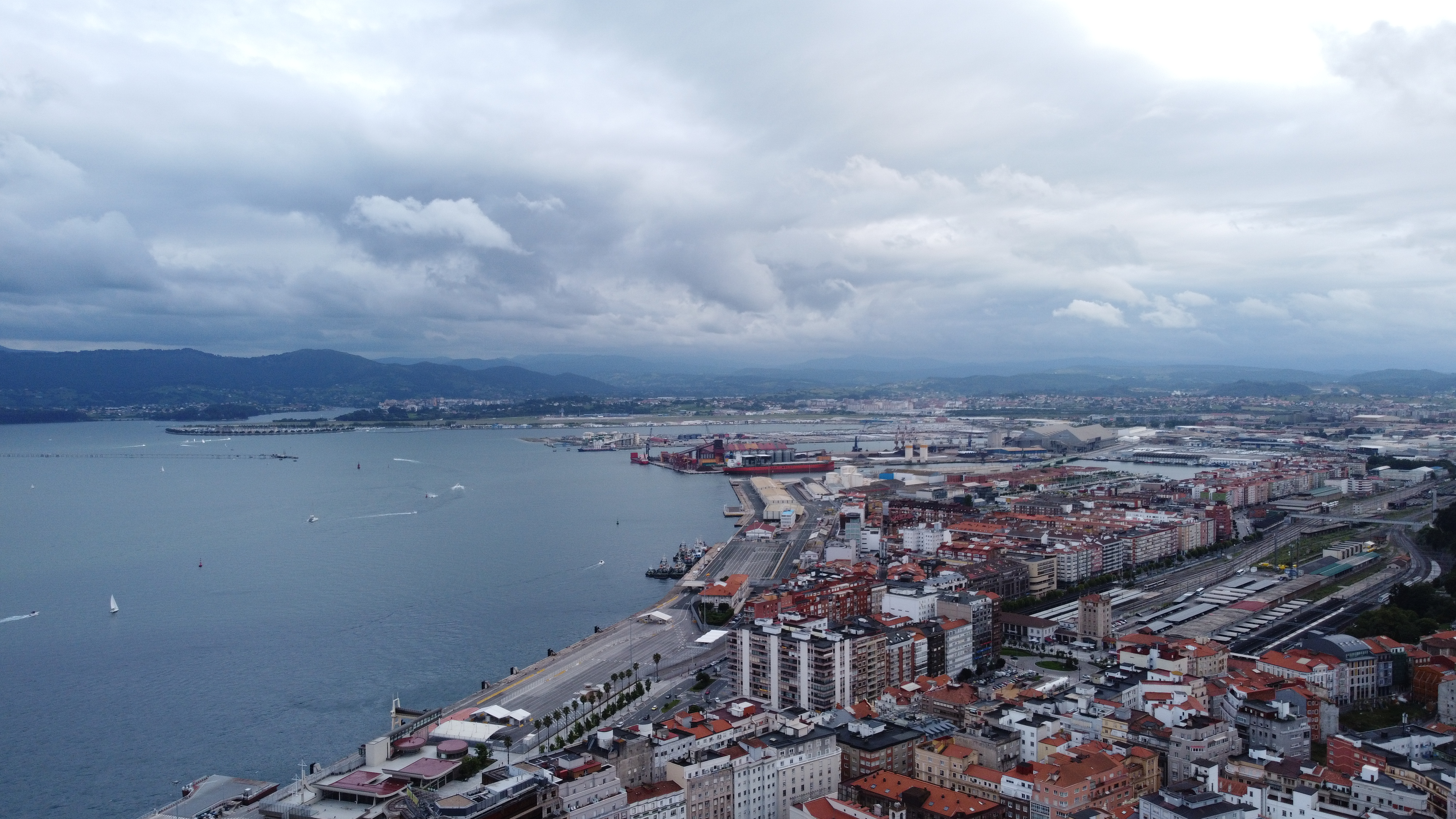
General view of the Port of Santander.

On August 11, 1918, the Santander Bonded Warehouse was founded, one of the first in the country.

In the mid-20th century, it was decided that, in order to increase capacity and competitiveness, it was necessary to move the port's tasks from the city center to another location, which would be an area of marshland in the Bay of Santander after it had been filled in. The site chosen to carry out the filling and, therefore, the new core of the port would be the Ría de Raos, on the municipal boundary between Santander and Camargo.

In 1985 the first Raos piers were inaugurated and four years later, in 1989, work was completed on the Raos north breakwater and the Ro-Ro and Ro-Pax ferry terminal. Later, with more modern and appropriate facilities, the port began to handle automobile traffic, one of its main activities.

In 1995, the construction of the Raos central breakwater began, which was completed two years later. In addition, a plan was drawn up for the use of the port spaces and the future organization and operation of the port.

=== 21st century ===
As a result of the continuous problems and complaints caused to the population near the port facilities by the handling of the large volumes of coal arriving at the port. In 2005, the process of building a bulk cargo terminal to serve the port began. After a long journey, the terminal was finally put into operation in June 2012, not without controversy.

=== Problems of draft ===
The bay of Santander suffers progressive silting due to the sediments that arrive from the rivers that discharge their waters into it. This has made it necessary to periodically dredge the entrance channel to the bay, which is used by ships to reach the port, located in the western part of the estuary. Even so, the bay's own draft limitations mean that larger ships cannot access the port, which has been to its detriment in favor of other nearby ports, such as Bilbao or Gijón. For decades, the need to build an outer harbor outside the bay has been considered in order not to stagnate the growth and competitiveness of the port, although the project has been discarded several times due to the high costs involved in building a new port and the environmental problems it would cause. Thus, the fact that the port is located within a bay, which was a great advantage in past centuries due to the protection it gave to ships, is now a disadvantage due to the impossibility of the port's growth.

The future logistics platform of Llano de la Pasiega is the way the port will have to solve the problems of increasing capacity to meet new traffic and the growth of current traffic, given that there is no possibility of creating an outer port in Santander and once any new landfill in the bay has been ruled out.

=== Future projects ===
- The Singular Project of Regional Interest (PSIR) of Llano de La Pasiega, a large logistics area planned in the municipality of Piélagos that would facilitate the expansion of vehicle traffic and solve the space limitations that the port currently has. The project is promoted by the Government of Cantabria and the Santander Port Authority.
- Extremadura frigate permanent floating museum.

== Location ==
=== Access ===
- S-10 from Bilbao and France.
- A-67 from Palencia, Burgos and Asturias.

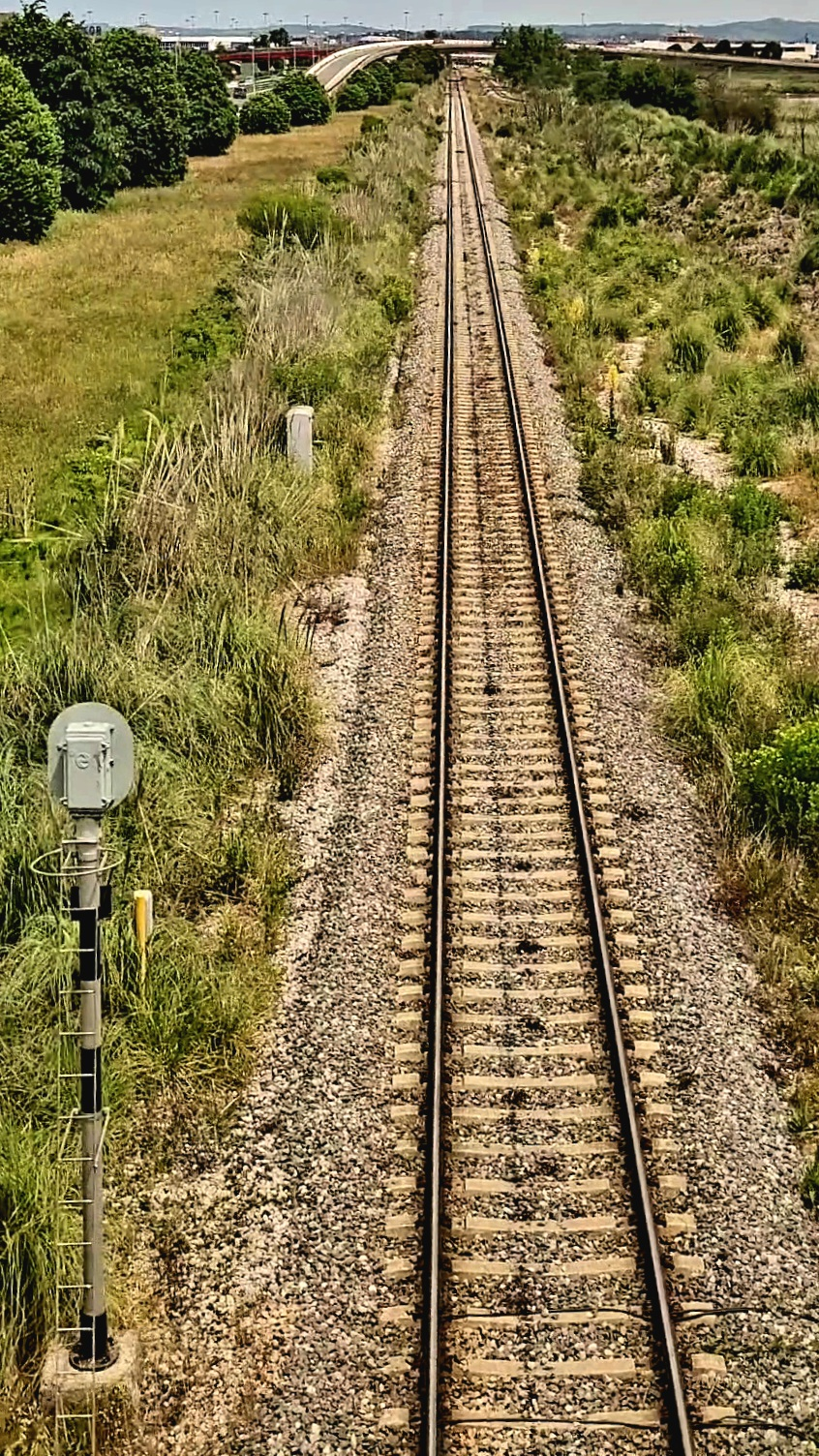
Iberian-gauge road access to the port of Santander.

- By rail:

Railroad access is by two single non-electrified tracks, one Iberian-gauge and the other metre-gauge. Both lines are managed by Adif up to the physical and functional connection point with the port's railway network. This limit is located under the viaduct of the S-10 highway and the Adif lines run parallel to it.

The Iberian-gauge branch line starts at the Muriedas freight terminal, which is located on the Palencia-Santander line, between the Muriedas Bahía and Nueva Montaña stops.

The Raos piers are connected to the Santander-Bilbao metric-gauge line, through line 774 of the Maliaño La Vidriera-Puerto de Raos Red Ferroviaria de Interés General. It is a 3.5 km long single track line without electrification with blocking in shunting regime.

== Facilities ==
=== Wharfs and singular buildings ===
From east to west and north to south:

==== Gamazo Dock ====
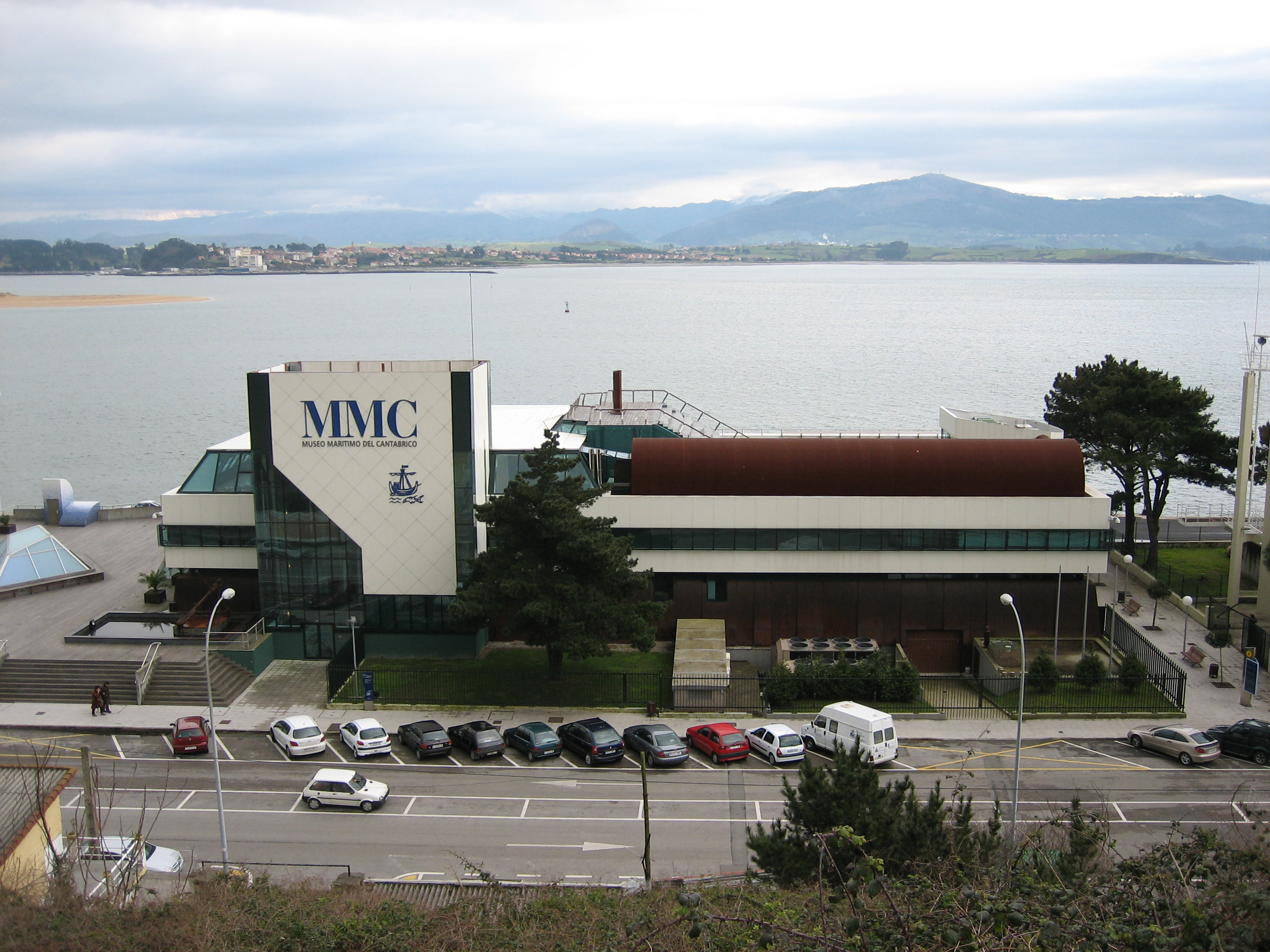
Cantabrian Maritime Museum, at Gamazo Dock.

This is a dry dock designed by Arturo Clemente in 1885 with dimensions of 132 m in length and 15 m in breadth. This facility of the Junta de Obras del Puerto remained in service from 1908 to 1989 and is currently integrated in the Gamazo Park. In its vicinity is also located:

- Cantabrian Maritime Museum.
- Oceanographic Center (Santander).
- Palacio de Festivales de Cantabria.
- Superior Technical School of Nautical.
- Specialized High Performance Sailing Center ''Príncipe Felipe''.
- Planetarium.

==== Molnedo Dock, Puertochico ====
This great project was designed in the 19th century by José de Lequerica, it was built to facilitate the work of the fishing boats. In the 1940s it changed from being the fishing port of the Cantabrian capital to being a marina, moving the fishing activity to the current Barrio Pesquero.

==== Calderón Wharf ====
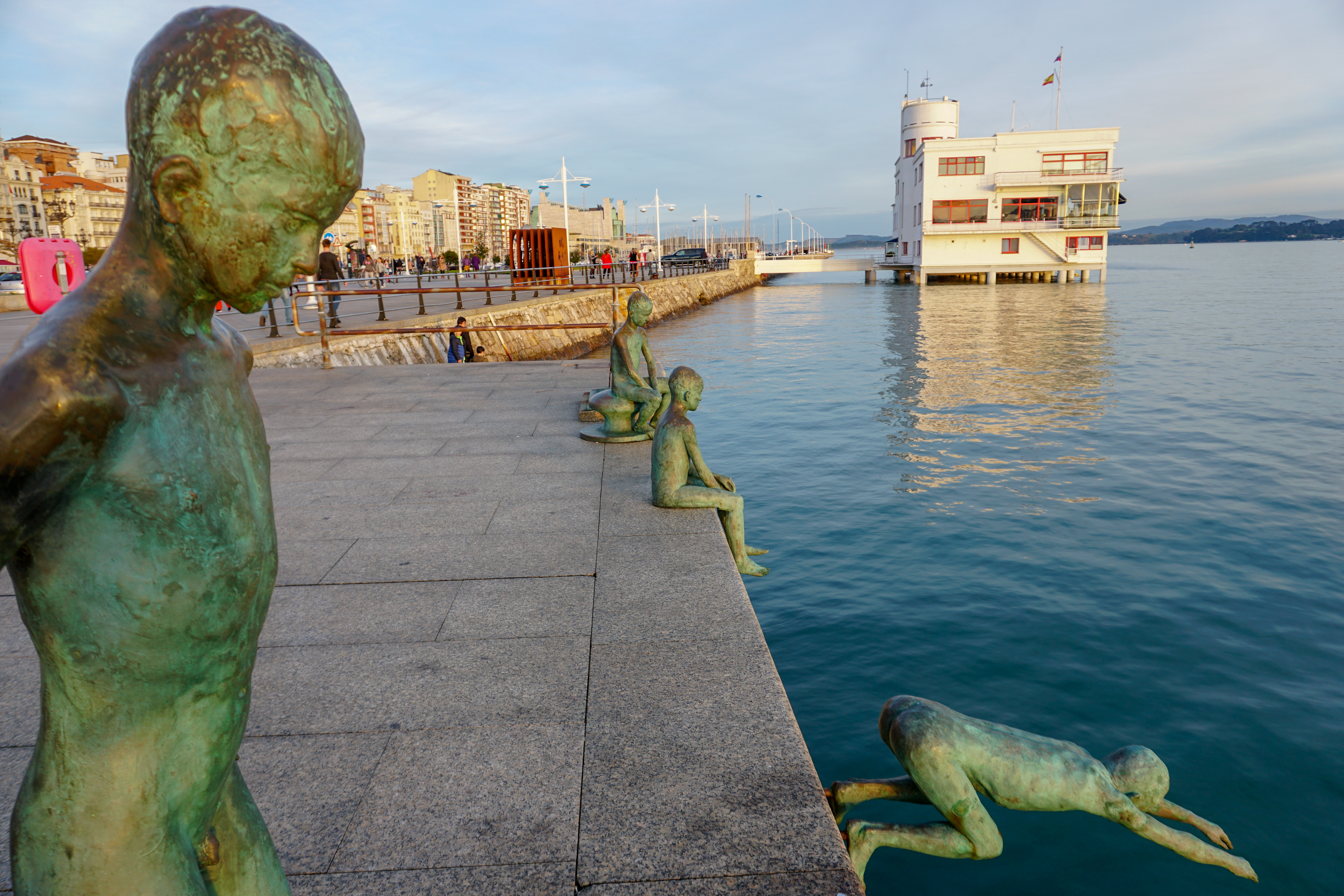
Sculptures of Los Raqueros and the building of the Real Club Marítimo de Santander, in the Calderón Wharf.

On August 12, 1821 (1820 according to other authors), the City Council of Santander signed an agreement with Guillermo Antonio Calderón, a native of Soto Iruz, in the Valley of Toranzo (Cantabria), by which it made him the concessionaire to build a wharf on his own account, which would eventually receive its name as Calderón Wharf (Muelle de Calderón), and which would continue the work of the then existing docks, extending them from their easternmost point at that time, in front of Martillo Street (Calle del Martillo, whose name came from the shape of the end of the breakwater that continued the street, and which today is officially Marcelino Sanz de Sautuola Street -who would not be born until ten years later-), to what is now Lope de Vega Street. Calderón's commitment was to begin work in the spring of 1822, continuing until its completion "without raising a hand". At present, the name Calderón wharf corresponds to the one that extends from the Grúa de Piedra to the Club Marítimo, with an approximate length of two hundred and seventy (270) meters.

This agreement breaks a period of inactivity in the Santander docks that began in 1794, after the "Plan of the docks of the city of Santander and its new population" of the Captain of Frigate Agustín de Colosía, commissioned by the Royal Consulate of Sea and Land of Santander, but which met with the final opposition of both this body and the City Council of Santander itself regarding its proposed widening.

The "Plan of the New Docks and New Town of the city of Santander", with the title "Plan showing the variations for the continuation of the project of works for the Dock, docks and new town of this City", was drawn in 1821 by the later architect José Peterrade, from Cádiz and then Master Builder of the municipality of Santander, in response to a Royal Order of 13 December 1821, and the works contained in it were then budgeted at the amount of one million eight hundred thousand reals. The plan already included the Media Luna (today's Plaza de Cañadío) and another square that should have been called Plaza de la Constitución, which is today's Plaza de Pombo. Copies of the plan are preserved in the Cantabrian Maritime Museum and the Municipal Library of Santander, as well as in some private collections.

The works on the docks were completed in 1825, in 1826 the paving of the new square began and in 1827 the first house on the dock was built from Martillo Street (that is, on the right half of the current Banco de Santander building). This house would be the home of Guillermo Calderón himself (costing him quite a few arguments with the City Council to obtain authorization for its construction), and no traces of it remain since on October 6, 1880, it was destroyed by fire, there being evidence that the Café Suizo and the Círculo de Recreo, two essential social scenarios in 19th-century Santander, were installed in it. In 1837 most of the buildings projected on the first line of the pier were already built, as reflected in the plan of Lieutenant José María Mathé, of that year 1837.

- Santander Royal Maritime Club. Singular building of rationalist style by the architect Gonzalo Bringas.
- Palacete del Embarcadero. Small building in origin royal wharf work of the architect Javier Gonzalez de Riancho. At the present time it is an exhibition and conference hall.

==== Maura Pier ====
The old stone crane and the Botín Art Center, at the Maura and Albareda docks.

Grúa de Piedra, designed by Sheldon and Gerdtzen in 1896, today remains as a monument reflecting the industrial and port tradition of the city.

==== Albareda, Almirante and Blocks piers ====
- Botín Centre. Art exhibition and conference building designed by architect Renzo Piano.
- Maritime Station. Singular building of expressionist and organicist style designed by the architect Ricardo Lorenzo García.

==== Maliaño piers and dock ====
- Marine Command

==== Piers of the north margin ====
===== Fishing port =====
- Fish market
- Ice factory

===== Raos piers =====
This area is divided into two jetties (North and Central) with 8 sections of docks in total, for different uses.

- Bulk solids station (Coal station)
- Beginning of the A-67
- Transport City
- Bonded warehouse
- Raos Industrial Park
- Raos estuary

===== Marina =====
- Cantabrian Marina
- Santander Airport
- Punta de Parayas Park
- Nuclear Equipment
- Ría del Carmen
- Marismas Blancas
- Marismas Negras
- Astander
- Pontejos Bridge

==== Dynasol wharf ====
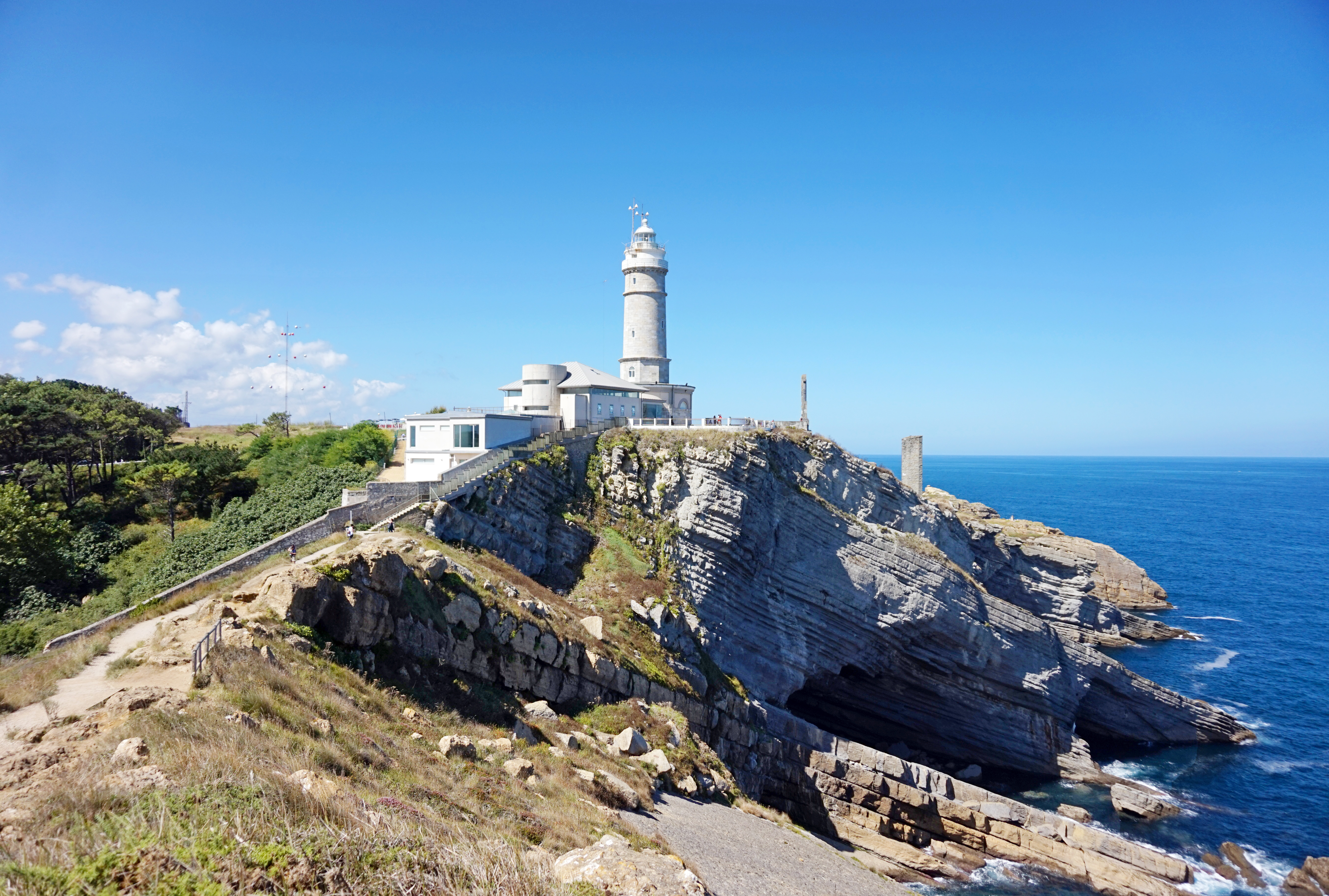
Cabo Mayor Lighthouse.

=== Lighthouses ===
- Cabo Mayor Lighthouse
- Isla de Mouro Lighthouse
- Punta de la Cerda Lighthouse

== Main products and activities ==
- Automobiles
- Coal
- Fishing
- Cereals
- Iron
- Cruises
- Ferry Ro-Ro and Ro-Pax, Santander - Plymouth and Santander - Portsmouth (Brittany Ferries); Santander - Poole (LD Lines)

== Dry ports ==
- Azuqueca de Henares, Guadalajara, Castilla-La Mancha.
- Luceni, Zaragoza, Aragon.
- A third to be determined in the Valladolid area.

== Hosted events ==
- Cutty Sark Regatta 2002
- Festival of the Sea 2005, 2014
- Sailing World Championships 2014
- Sailing World Cup 2017

== See also ==
- Ports of the State
- List of ports in Spain
- Bay of Santander
  - Santander
  - Camargo
  - El Astillero
  - Marina de Cudeyo
