= Wello Penguin =

Wave power device

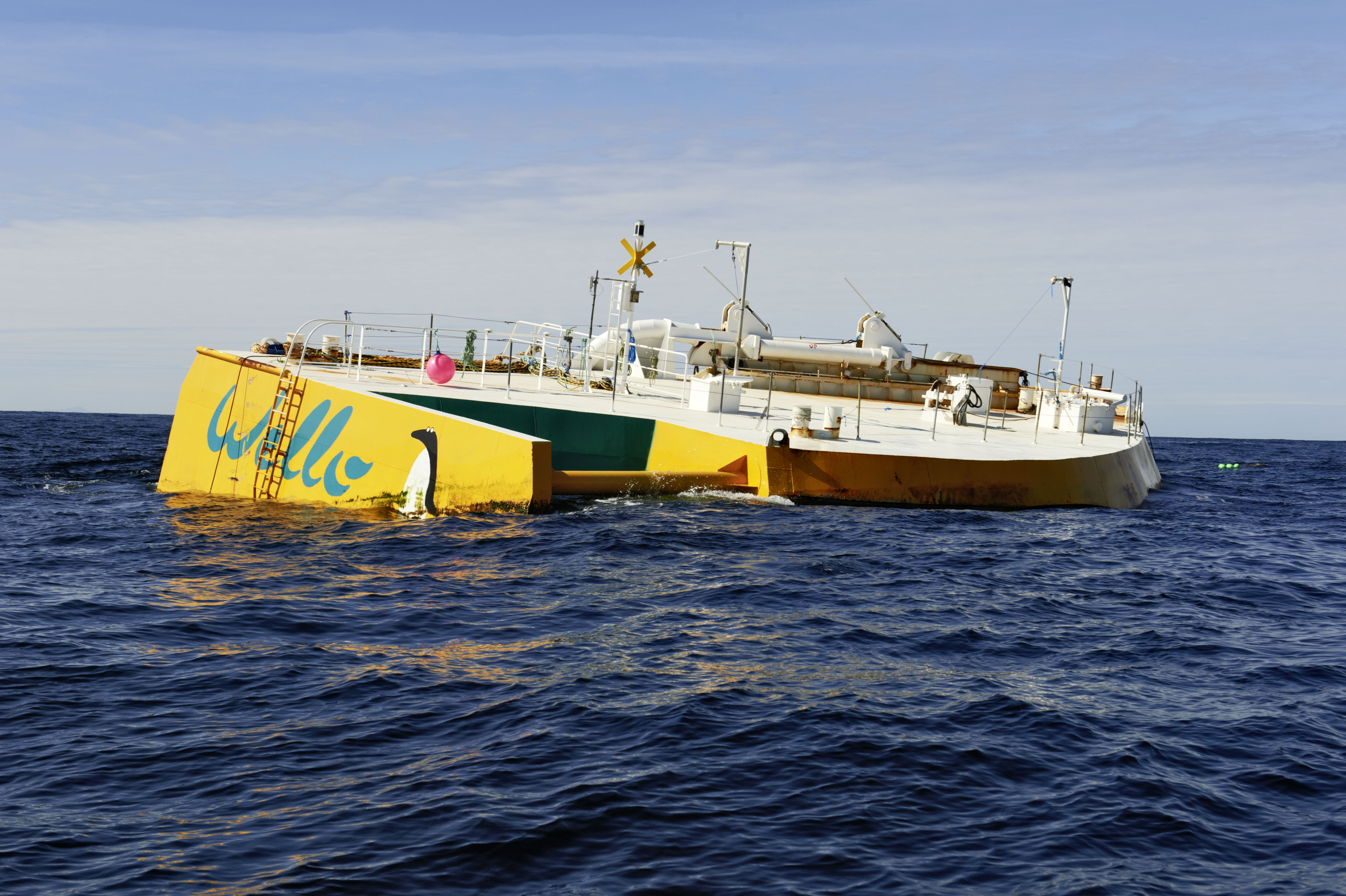
The Wello Penguin at Billia Croo in May 2014

The Penguin is a wave energy converter (WEC) which was developed by Finnish company Wello Oy between 2008 and 2023. Two full-scale device were constructed, and tested in Scotland and Spain respectively, although both tests ended in difficulties.

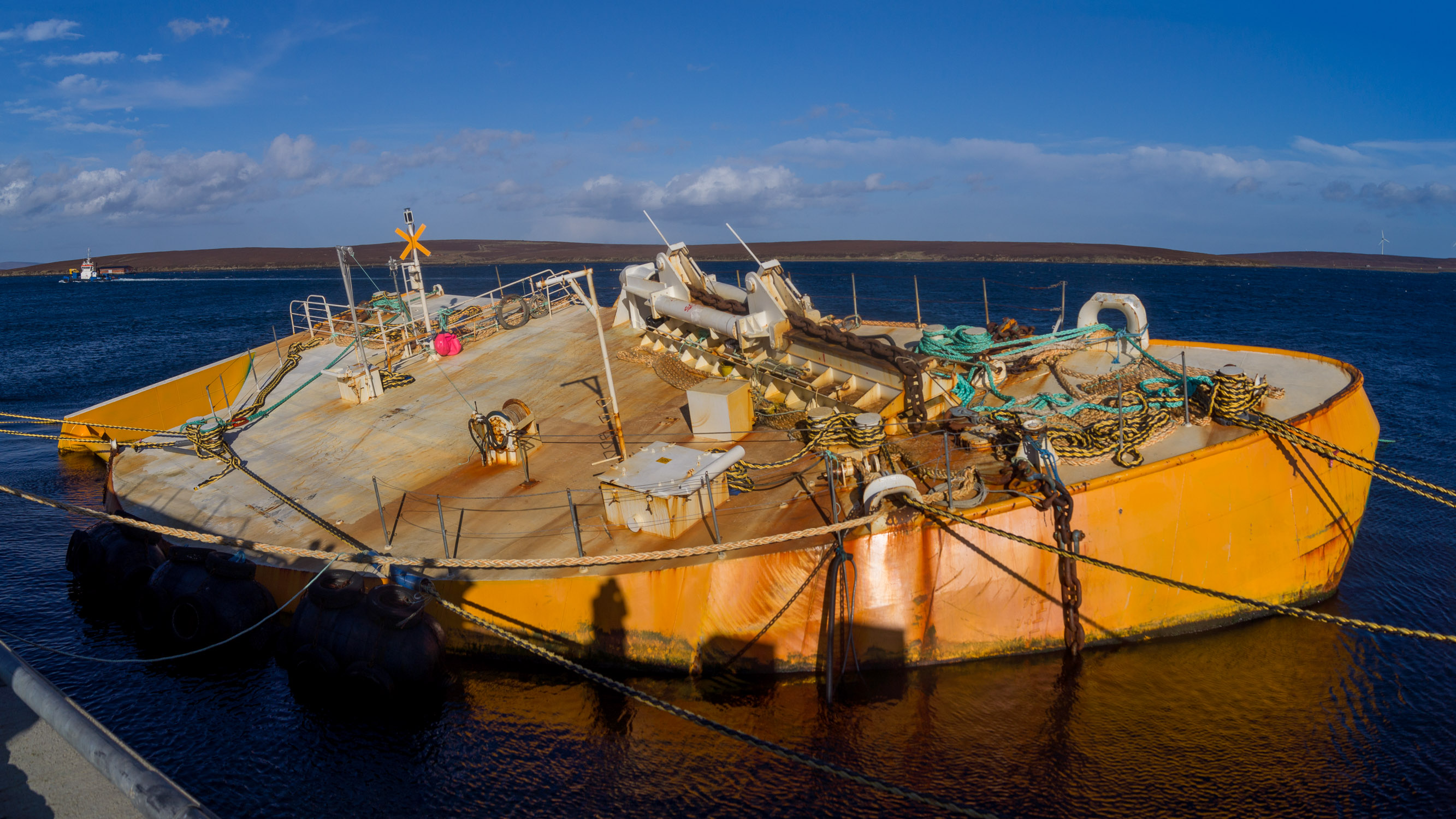
The Wello Penguin WEC moored at Lyness Pier, Hoy, Orkney in March 2014

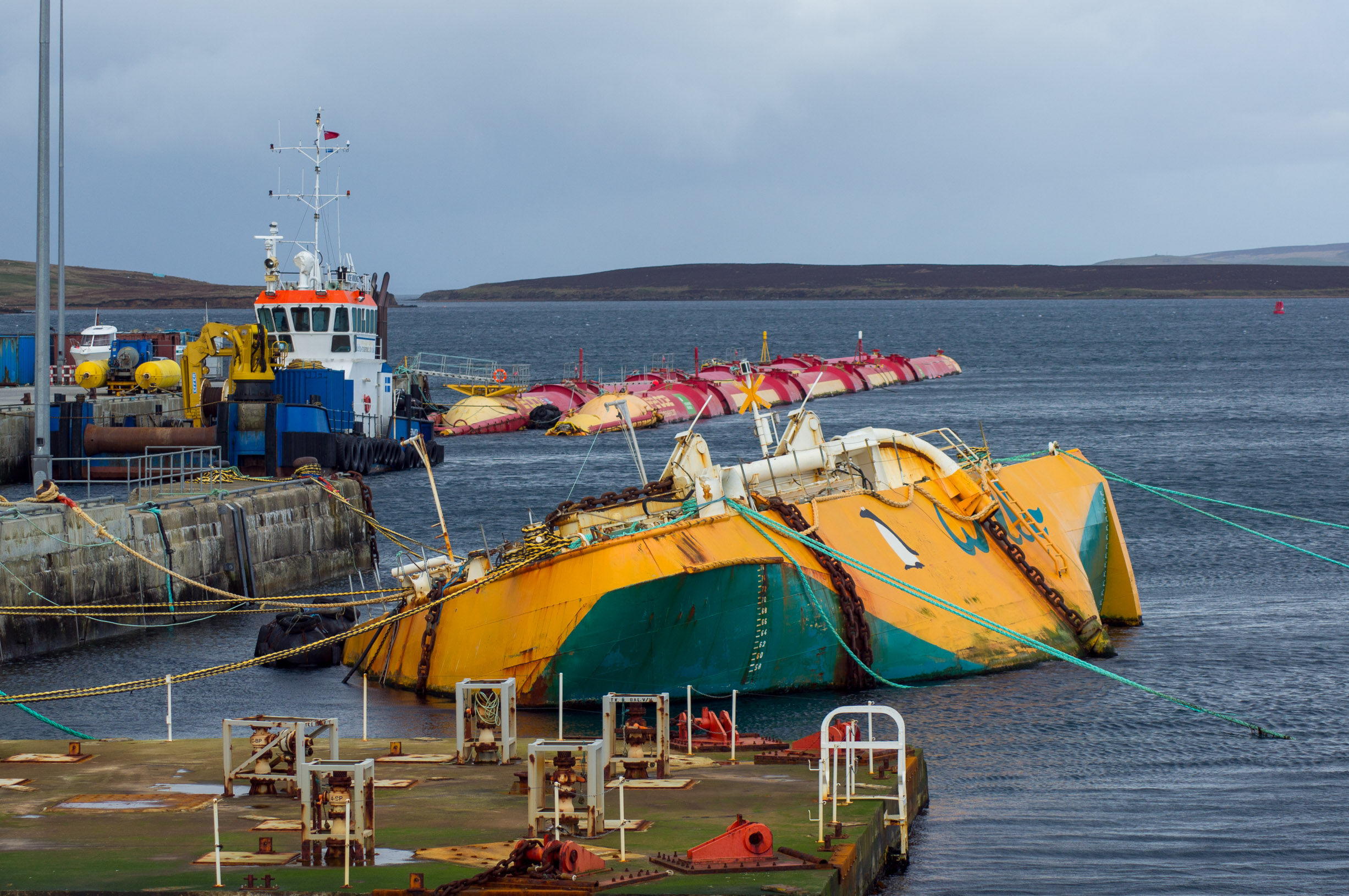
The Wello Penguin WEC moored at Lyness Pier, Hoy, Orkney with the 2 Pelamis P2 WECs behind

The concept was a rotating-mass type WEC, with an asymmetric counterweight connected to a generator to harvest energy from the movement of the hull in passing waves. An assessment of wave energy technologies in 2020 rated it at a technology readiness level of TRL7, i.e. full-scale prototypical system demonstration in a relevant environment.

== Device concept ==
The device is a floating asymmetric hull containing a rotating mass which drives a generator, without the need for hydraulic systems or a gearbox, and uses similar components to wind turbines. Passing waves cause the hull to move in roll, heave, and pitch, this motion driving the asymmetric counterweight and flywheel, connected to an electrical generator housed inside the hull. The counterweight rotates around a vertical axis, nominally parallel to the gravity vector, and can be considered a type of pendulum.

The design is such that all moving parts of the WEC are contained within the hull. The hull also has multiple watertight compartments, which were claimed would keep the device afloat.

Different sources quote the rated power of the Penguin WEC as 0.5 MW, 0.6 MW, or even 1 MW.

== History ==
Wello Oy was founded in 2008, based in Espoo, Finland. In 2014, Fortum acquired a 13.6% minority share in the company. In September 2023, Wello filed for bankruptcy, ceasing development of the wave energy technology after 15 years.

The concept was initially tested in wave tanks and at sea between 2008 and 2011, before full-scale sea trials.

=== Penguin WEC1 at EMEC ===
This first full-scale 0.5 MW device was tested at the European Marine Energy Centre (EMEC) in Orkney, Scotland between 2011 and 2019. Initial tests commenced in June 2011. It was then deployed at the grid-connected Billia Croo in 2012, where it was connected to the grid via an 11 kV subsea cable. Initial test data confirmed the prototype was performing as expected from earlier testing.

In April 2015, Wello extended the testing by an additional year. When not being tested, the device was moored at Lyness on the Orkney island of Hoy.

The fourth test deployment commenced in March 2017, however after just over two years of continuous operation, the device sank in March 2019. It had survived waves of over 18 m during that time.

=== Clean Energy From Ocean Waves project ===
The Clean Energy From Ocean Waves (CEFOW) project was funded by the European Horizon 2020 programme. The initial aim was to deploy three 1 MW Penguin WECs at the Wave Hub test site in Cornwall, England. The project was coordinated by Finnish utility company Fortum. WEC1 was to be transferred from EMEC to Wave Hub, and joined by a further two devices manufactured for the project. The project was to include a smart subsea hub using dry-mate connectors to connect the three WECs onto a single export cable.

The location was revised to EMEC, due to the easier nearshore Billia Croo site. WEC1 was redeployed as part of the CEFOW project in March 2017, having been towed back from Falmouth by Green Marine.

The second Penguin WEC was constructed in Tallinn, Estonia, and launched in December 2018. The device was towed across the North Sea to Orkney and moored at Hatston Pier, Kirkwall, however the CEFOW project was cancelled in 2019.

=== Penguin 2 at BiMEP ===
The second-generation device was tested at the Biscay Marine Energy Platform (BiMEP) in the Basque Country of northern Spain. Wello announced the testing in September 2020, and hoped to deploy the device in October after a two-week tow from Scotland by Saipem. The 44 m long, 0.6 MW device eventually started generating electricity to the Spanish grid in September 2021, having been installed in July. It was proposed to test the device for two years. Saipem were responsible for the installation and the ongoing operations and maintenance.

In December 2021, the device was recovered to Vizcaya harbour after a minor leakage was detected inside the device. It was then moved to the Port of Bilbao, where it had remained for over a year, as of March 2023.
