= Medieval commune =

European commune in the Middle Ages

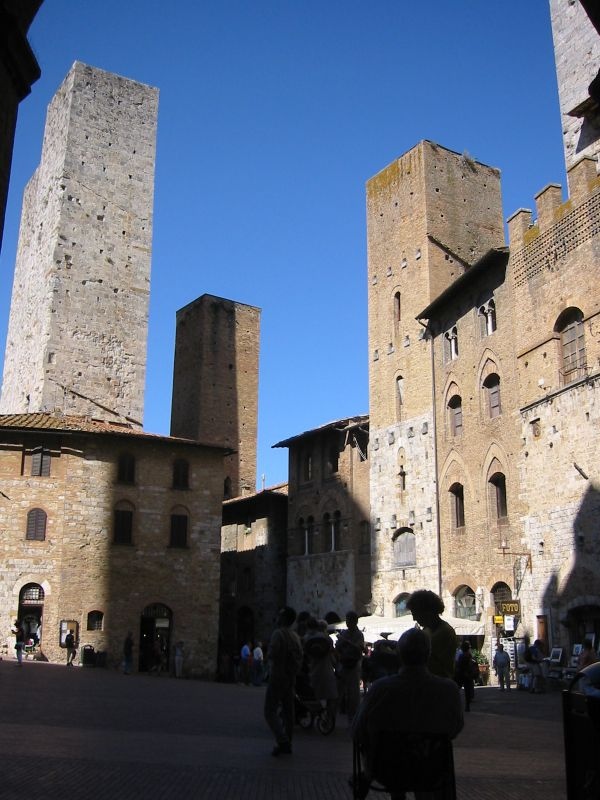
Defensive towers at San Gimignano, Tuscany, bear witness to the factional strife within communes.

Medieval communes in the European Middle Ages had sworn allegiances of mutual defense (both physical defense and of traditional freedoms) among the citizens of a town or city. These took many forms and varied widely in organization and makeup.

Communes are first recorded in the late 11th and early 12th centuries, thereafter becoming a widespread phenomenon. They had greater development in central-northern Italy, where they became city-states based on partial democracy. At the same time in Germany they became free cities, independent from local nobility.

== Etymology ==
The English and French word commune (Italian: comune) appears in Latin records in various forms. They come from Medieval Latin communia, plural form of commune ('that which is common, community, state'), substantive noun from communis (common). Ultimately, the Proto-Indo-European root is *mey- ('to change, exchange').

When autonomy was won through violent uprising and overthrow, the commune was often called conspiratio ('a conspiracy', Italian: cospirazione).

== Origins ==
During the 10th century in several parts of Western Europe, peasants began to gravitate towards walled population centers, as advances in agriculture (the three-field system) resulted in greater productivity and intense competition. In central and northern Italy, and in Provence and Septimania, most of the old Roman cities had survived—even if grass grew in their streets—largely as administrative centers for a diocese or for the local representative of a distant kingly or imperial power. In the Low Countries, some new towns were founded upon long-distance trade, where the staple was the woolen cloth-making industry. The sites for these ab ovo towns, more often than not, were the fortified burghs of counts, bishops or territorial abbots. Such towns were also founded in the Rhineland. Other towns were simply market villages, local centers of exchange.

Such townspeople needed physical protection from lawless nobles and bandits, part of the motivation for gathering behind communal walls, but also strove to establish their liberties, the freedom to conduct and regulate their own affairs and security from arbitrary taxation and harassment from the bishop, abbot, or count in whose jurisdiction these obscure and ignoble social outsiders lay. This was a long process of struggling to obtain charters that guaranteed such basics as the right to hold a market. Such charters were often purchased at exorbitant rates, or granted, not by the local power, but by a king or by the emperor, who came to hope to enlist the towns as allies in order to centralize power.

The walled city provided protection from direct assault at the price of corporate interference on the pettiest levels, but once a townsman left the city walls, he (for women scarcely travelled) was at the mercy of often violent and lawless nobles in the countryside. Because much of medieval Europe lacked central authority to provide protection, each city had to provide its own protection for citizens - both inside the city walls, and outside. Thus towns formed communes which were a legal basis for turning the cities into self-governing corporations. In most cases the development of communes was connected with that of the cities. However, there were rural communes, notably in France and England, that formed to protect the common interests of villagers. At their heart, communes were sworn allegiances of mutual defense. When a commune formed, all participating members gathered and swore an oath in a public ceremony, promising to defend each other in times of trouble, and to maintain the peace within the city proper.

The commune movement started in the 10th century, with a few earlier ones like Forlì (possibly 889), and gained strength in the 11th century in northern Italy, which had the most urbanized population of Europe at the time. It then spread in the early 12th century to France, Germany, Spain and elsewhere. The English state was already very centralized, so the communal movement mainly manifested itself in parishes, craftsmen's and merchants' guilds and monasteries. State officialdom expanded in England and France from the 12th century onwards, while the Holy Roman Empire was ruled by communal coalitions of cities, knights, farmer republics, prince-bishops and the large domains of the imperial lords. In eastern Europe, the splintering of Kievan Rus' allowed the formation of veche communes like the Novgorod Republic (1136-1478) and the Pskov Republic (1348-1510).

One in four urban communities in France were under the administration of mayors and échevins (Northern France) or consuls and jurats (Southern France) by 1300, and this number increased rapidly in the next 2 centuries due to the financial demands of city wall-building. Many were granted the rights to assembly, and executive power was often concentrated in one elected official, the mayor or first consul, with an advisory body of conseils. Election was often restricted to the wealthy local merchant elite.

In medieval Spain, urban communities were self-governing through their concejo abierto or open council of property-owners. The larger towns delegated authority to regidores (town councillors) and alcaldes (law officers), who managed the town and the surrounding lands as one communidad. After the Middle Ages, selection of officials was changed from election to sortition, in order to resolve factional conflict. In Cantabria, seafaring towns led by Burgos formed the Hermandad de las Marismas (Marsh brotherhood), an organisation similar to the Hanseatic league. In the 1470s the Santa Hermandad or Holy Brotherhood was formed, in which all municipalities sent representatives to a junta general which would coordinate law enforcement to protect trade.

== Social order ==
According to Adalberon, society was composed of the three orders: those who fight (the nobles), those who pray (the clergy), and those who work (the peasants). In theory, this was a balance between spiritual and secular peers, with the third order providing labour for the other two. The urban communes were a break in this order.

The Church and King both had mixed reactions to communes. On the one hand, they agreed safety and protection from lawless nobles was in everyone's best interest. The commune's intention was to keep the peace through the threat of revenge, and the Church was sympathetic to the end result of peace.

However, the Church had its own ways to enforce peace, such as the Peace and Truce of God movement, for example. Some communes disrupted the order of medieval society in that the methods the commune used, eye for an eye, violence begets violence, were generally not acceptable to Church or King. There was an idea among some that communes threatened the medieval social order. Only the noble lords were allowed by custom to fight, and ostensibly the merchant townspeople were workers, not warriors. As such, the nobility and the clergy sometimes accepted communes, but other times did not. One of the most famous cases of a commune being suppressed and the resulting defiant urban revolt occurred in the French town of Laon in 1112.

== Rural communes ==
The development of medieval rural communes arose more from a need to collaborate to manage the commons than out of defensive needs. In times of a weak central government, communes typically formed to ensure the safety on the roads through their territory to enable commerce (Landfrieden). One of the more successful of these medieval communities was the one in the alpine valleys north of the Gotthard Pass. This later resulted in the formation of the Old Swiss Confederacy. The Swiss had numerous written acts of alliance: for each new canton that joined the confederacy, a new contract was written.

Besides the Swiss Eidgenossenschaft, there were similar rural alpine communes in County of Tyrol, but these were destroyed by the House of Habsburg. Other such rural communes developed in the Graubünden, in the French Alps (Republic of the Escartons or Briançonnais), in the Pyrenees, in northern France (Roumare), in northern Germany (Frisia and Dithmarschen), and also in Sweden and Norway. The colonization of the Walser also is related.

Pyrenean villages such as Vicdessos, in common with many other montane communities, enjoyed far greater liberties than those enjoyed in the north of France. The Counts of Foix granted these villages charters recognising their right to governance and both civil and criminal justice administered by their own consuls, and exemption from fees on the use of forests, waters, mines, pastures, mountains, meadows and tolls on trading with other villages. They even successfully won their case against payment of taxes to King Philip IV of France. The Vallée d'Aspe was another medieval Pyrenean republic, based in Accous and under the suzerainty of the Viscounts of Bearn. The rights of the republic was confirmed by King Louis XIII when he united Bearn to France. These communities thrived in natural isolation and lack of seigneurial interest in interference, particularly in the Western Pyrenees such as the Vallée d'Aspe (governed by their own jurats), Vallée d'Ossau, as well as the independent legislative assemblies in the Valley of Cauterets, or the Vallée d'Azun. These communities, called beziau, signed treaties with other villages generally meant to govern access to pastures.

Some Southern-European medieval communes were influenced by the Italian precedent, but many northern ones (and even the Swiss communes north of Gotthard Pass) may well have developed concurrently and independently from the Italian ones. Only a few of these medieval rural communes ever attained imperial immediacy, where they would have been subject only to the king or emperor; most still remained subjects of some more or less distant liege.

== Evolution in Italy and decline in Europe ==
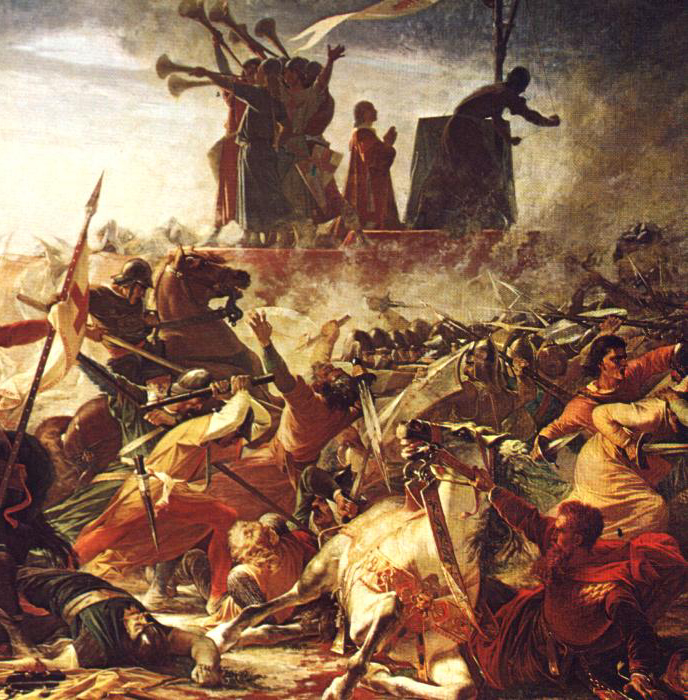
The defence of the Carroccio during the battle of Legnano (1176) by Amos Cassioli (1832–1891)

During the 11th century in northern Italy a new political and social structure emerged. In most places where communes arose (e.g. France, Britain and Flanders), they were absorbed by monarchical states. But in northern and central Italy, some medieval communes developed into independent and powerful city-states.

The breakaway from their feudal overlords by these communes occurred in the late 12th century and 13th century, during the Investiture Controversy between the Pope and the Holy Roman Emperor. Milan led the Lombard cities against the Holy Roman Emperors and defeated them, gaining independence (battles of Legnano, 1176, and Parma, 1248). Meanwhile, the republics of Venice, Pisa and Genoa were able to conquer their naval empires on the Mediterranean sea (in 1204 Venice conquered three-eights of the Byzantine Empire in the Fourth Crusade). Cities such as Florence, Parma, Ferrara, Verona, Padua, Lucca, Siena, Mantua and others were able to create stable states at the expenses of their neighbors, some of which lasted until modern times. In southern Italy, which then formed the Kingdom of Sicily, autonomous communes were rarer, Republic of Sassari in Sardinia being one example.

In the Holy Roman Empire, the emperors always had to face struggles with other powerful players: the land princes on the one hand, but also the cities and communes on the other hand. The emperors thus invariably fought political (not always military) battles to strengthen their position and that of the imperial monarchy. In the Golden Bull of 1356, emperor Charles IV outlawed any conjurationes, confederationes, and conspirationes, meaning in particular the leagues of towns but also the rural communal leagues that had sprung up. Most leagues of towns were subsequently dissolved, sometimes forcibly, and where refounded, their political influence was much reduced. Nevertheless, some of these communes (as Frankfurt, Nuremberg, Hamburg) were able to survive in Germany for centuries and became almost independent city-state vassals to the Holy Roman Emperors (see Free imperial city).

== Examples ==
Listed alphabetically by the name of the modern states where possible.

=== Austria ===
- Bregenz

=== Croatia ===
- Ragusa
- Poljica

=== France ===
- Republic of the Escartons

=== Germany ===
- Butjadingen
- Stadland
- Land Hadeln
- Berching
- Stedingen
- Kehdingen
- Hanseatic League
- Dithmarchen
- Land Wursten
- Mulhouse
- Free imperial cities
- Imperial Estates
- Imperial villages

=== Greece ===
- Byzantium

=== Iceland ===
- Iceland

=== Italy ===
- Ancona
- Genoa
- Noli
- Lucca
- Pisa
- Siena
- Florence
- Massa Marittima
- Golden Ambrosian Republic
- San Gimignano
- Bologna
- Pavia
- Sassari

=== Jerusalem, Kingdom of ===
In today's Israel, Palestine and Lebanon (1099–1187)

- Acre commune (est. 1232)

=== Low Countries ===
- Frisian freedom

=== Russia ===
- Pskov
- Novgorod

=== Sweden ===
- Gotland

=== Switzerland ===
- Old Swiss Confederacy

=== Turkey ===
- Antioch

== Sources ==
- Jones, Philip. 1997. The Italian City-State: From Commune to Signoria. (Oxford: Oxford University Press)
- Lansing, Carol, 1992. The Florentine Magnates: Lineage and Faction in a Medieval Commune. (Princeton: Princeton University Press)
- Sella, Pietro, "The Statutes of the Commune of Bugelle (Biella)" 1904. 14th-century statutes of a Piedmontese commune (Latin and English translations), express the nature of the commune in vivid detail, productions of medieval society and the medieval personality.
- Tabacco, Giovanni, 1989. The Struggle for Power in Medieval Italy: Structures of Political Rule, 400-1400, translator, Rosalind Brown Jensen (New York: Cambridge University Press)
- Waley, Donald, 1969 etc. The Italian City-Republics (3rd ed. New York: Longman, 1988.)
- Guelph University, "The Urban Past: IV. The Medieval City" A bibliography.
