= Biscay Marine Energy Platform =

Marine energy test site

Biscay Marine Energy Platform (BiMEP)
- Country: Spain
- Location: Basque Country
- Coordinates: 43°28′20″N 2°52′43″W
- Status: Operational test centre
- Construction began: 2008
- Commission date: 2015

Wave power station
- Type: Offshore test site
- Water body: Bay of Biscay
- Water depth: 70 m (230 ft)

Wind farm
- Type: Offshore test site

Power generation
- Units operational: 1 × 2 MW DemoSAFT

The Biscay Marine Energy Platform (BiMEP) is a renewable energy test site located in the Bay of Biscay off the coast of the Basque Country, Spain. It is publicly funded, 75% by the Basque Energy Agency (Basque: Energiaren Euskal Erakundea, Spanish: Ente Vasco de la Energía, EVE), and 25% by the Spanish Government's Institute for the Diversification and Saving of Energy (Instituto para la Diversificación y Ahorro de la Energía, IDAE).

The main offshore test site is located north of Armintza, Bizkaia, about 20 km (12 miles) north of Bilbao. This has four pre-consented test berths, each with a 5 MW grid connection. BiMEP also manages the Mutriku Breakwater Wave Plant in Mutriku, about 45 km (28 miles) east along the coast.

Several wave power concepts, or wave energy converters (WEC) and a floating wind turbine have been tested at BiMEP. It is also home to the Harshlab offshore materials testing platform.

== BiMEP offshore test site ==
The offshore test site encompasses an area of 5.3 km^{2} (2.0 sq mi) located 1.7 to 4.5 km (1.1 to 2.8 mi) offshore, with water depths of 50 to 90 m (160 to 300 ft). It contains four test berths, each with a 5 MW three-phase electrical cable operating at 13.2 kV connecting to an onshore substation. The site has a high wave energy resource of 21 kW/m, and is only 1 nmi (1.9 km; 1.2 mi) from the nearest port.

It is possible to monitor the devices being tested from the research centre in Armintza.

The test centre offers technology developers a pre-consented test site, with the grid connection already in place. This offers significant savings, in both time and money, to the developers. The licensing procedure for BiMEP was around five years, while the process for a device to be tested there is lass than three months.

The test centre received close to €20 million in public investment, mostly from the Basque Government, but also from the Spanish Government and the European Commission. The test centre was expected to create additional economic activity and employment in the surrounding region, both directly and subcontracts.

=== History ===
The project started in 2008, and was officially inaugurated in July 2015.

In February 2009, an oceanographic buoy was installed to measure the sea and weather conditions at the site. The Ministry of Environment granted permission for the BiMEP site in July 2009.

Horizontal drilling for the power cables commenced in November 2012, following administrative authorisation. In summer 2013, seven marker buoys were installed to demarcate the test area, followed by the four subsea electrical cables. The onshore substation was completed early in 2014.

=== HarshLab ===
The BiMEP test site is also home to the HarshLab offshore testing platform, designed to test materials and subcomponents in the harsh marine environment of the Bay of Biscay.

The first version was installed in September 2018, and survived waves of up to 8 metres (26 ft) and wind speeds of 20 knots (37 km/h; 23 mph) during Storm Epsilon in 2020. It was decommissioned in August 2021.

In December 2021, a second version of HarshLab was launched at the Port of Bilbao, waiting for suitable window for installation. It was installed at BiMEP in summer 2022. This version is 8.5 m (28 ft) in diameter, and 7 m (23 ft) high. It is connected to the BiMEP grid and data communications network, and has a Remotely operated underwater vehicle on the platform to perform underwater inspections.

== Devices tested ==
=== MARMOK-A-5 ===
Oceantec Energías Marinas developed the MARMOK-A-5 WEC, and have tested two versions at BiMEP, as part of the "Open Sea Wave Operating Experience to Reduce Energy Cost" (OPERA) project. The 30 kW device was first deployed in October 2016 until June 2018, when it was refurbished and redeployed in October 2018 for a further year, until July 2019. The device was installed in approximately 85 m (280 ft) water depth.

=== Wello Penguin 2 ===
In 2021, the second Wello Penguin WEC was tested at BiMEP. The device was installed in July 2021, and was reported to be producing power to the Spanish grid by September. Originally, it was proposed to test the device for two years, but damage and minor leakage caused by an object hitting the device in December meant the test was cut short, and the device was returned to Vizcaya harbour.

=== DemoSATH Floating Wind Platform ===
The DemoSATH floating wind platform, developed by Saitec Offshore Technologies in collaboration with RWE Offshore Wind, has been tested at BiMEP since 2023. "SATH" stands for Swinging Around Twin Hull, which is a concrete platform with a single-point mooring turret connected to six mooring lines. The floating foundation is approximately 30 by 64 m (100 by 210 ft) and is a similar concept used in Floating production storage and offloading vessels.

The 2 MW turbine was installed onto the foundation at the quayside of the Port of Bilbao in the summer of 2022, and towed to site the following year in August 2023. The turbine started producing power on 18 September 2023. The turbine is located approximately 2 miles (3 km) offshore.
