= Hermandad =

Hermandad or La Hermandad (Spanish for 'brotherhood') may refer to:

- Santa Hermandad, a military association of medieval Spain
- Hermandad General de Andalucía, medieval regional confederation in Andalusia
- Hermandad de las Marismas, a federation of the main ports of the Cantabrian Sea
- Hermandad de las Cuatro Villas, a medieval and modern administrative entity of the coastal cities of Castile
- Hermandad de Campoo de Suso, municipality in Cantabria
- Hermandad Lírica, 19th-century group of women poets
- La Hermandad, crimincal syndicate in Man on Fire (2004 film)
- La hermandad – en el principio fue el ruido, 2009 album by Die Toten Hosen
- La Hermandad (TV series), Mexican drama
