= Ports of the State =

Puertos del Estado
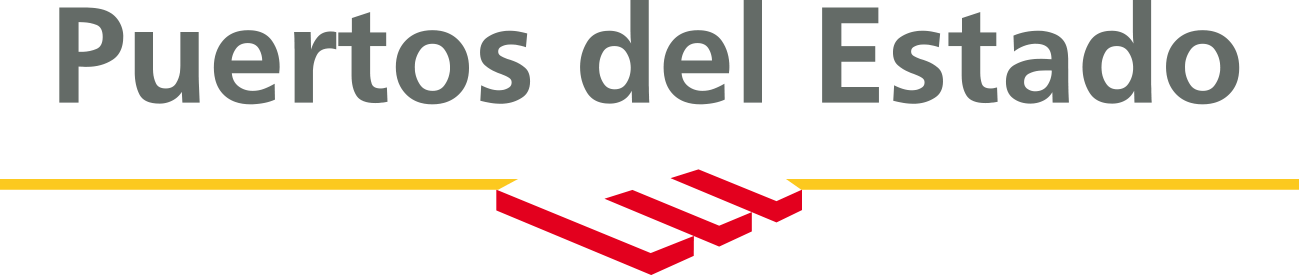

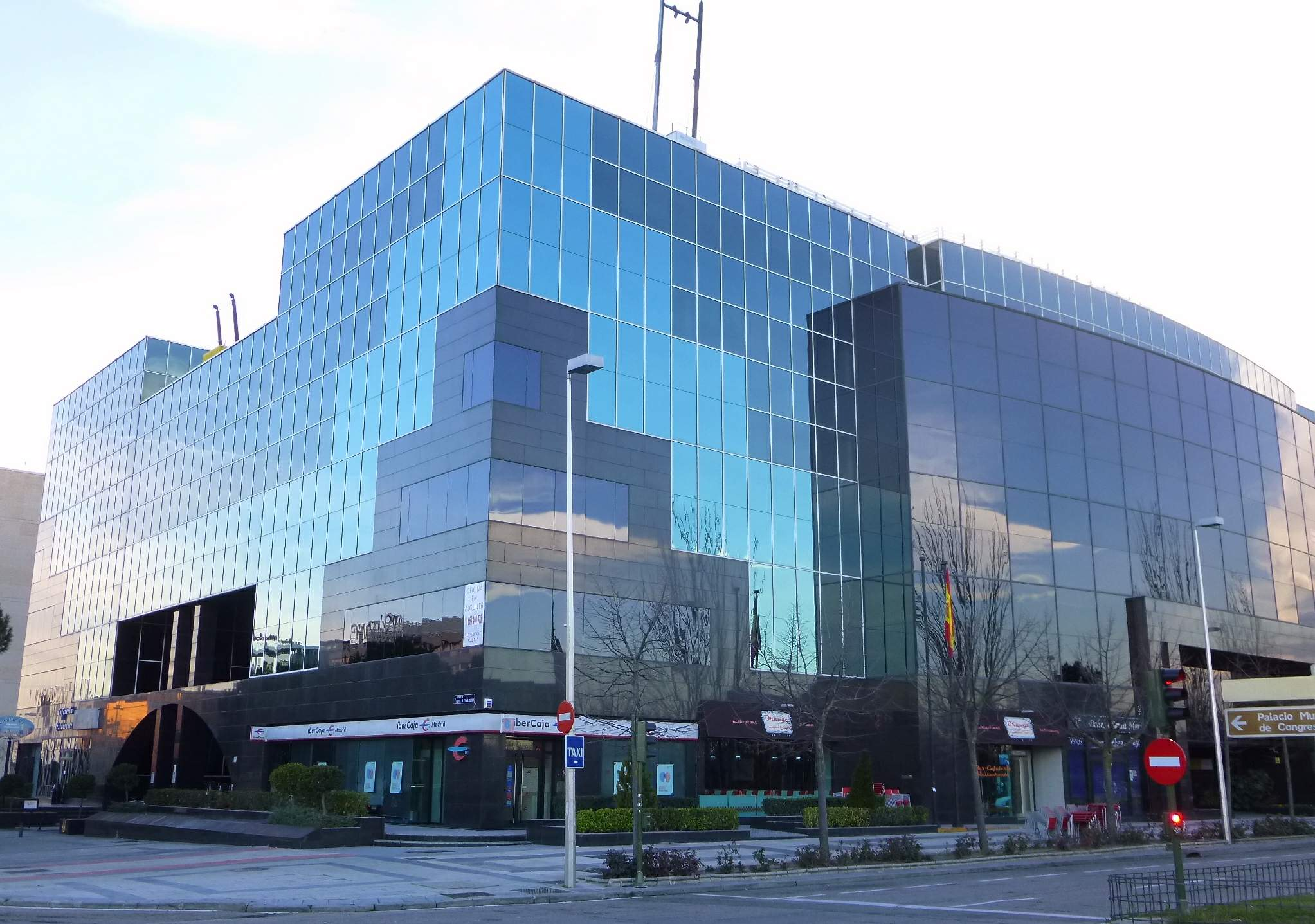
- PdE headquarters
- Industry: Port management
- Founded: November 24, 1992; 33 years ago
- Headquarters: Madrid, Spain
- Area served: Spain
- Key people: Álvaro Rodríguez Dapena, Chairman
- Services: Ports management
- Revenue: ▲€ 1.24 billion (2023)
- Net income: ▲€ 315.7 million (2023)
- Total assets: ▲€ 15.2 billion (2023)
- Owner: Government of Spain
- Number of employees: 100,000 direct and 175,000 indirect
- Parent: Ministry of Development
- Divisions: 46 ports 28 Port Authorities
- Website: puertos.es

Ports of the State (Spanish: Puertos del Estado) is a State-owned company responsible for the management of Spanish state-owned ports. The company executes the port policy of the Government and coordinates and controls the efficiency of the port system, made up of 28 Port authorities that manage the 46 ports of general interest.

This company, along with ENAIRE, exists for a constitutional mandate in Article 149, which grants the State the exclusive competence of ports and airports.

== Competences ==
The functions of the company are regulated in the Royal Legislative Decree 2/2011, of September 5, about State Ports and the Merchant Navy:

- The execution of the Government's ports policy and the coordination and control of efficiency of the Ports System of State, in the terms foreseen in this law.
- The general coordination with the different bodies of the General State Administration that establish controls in the port spaces and with modes of transport in the scope of state competition, from the point of view of port activity.
- Training, promotion of research and technological development in matters related to economy, management, logistics and port engineering and others related to the activity carried out in ports, as well as the development of measurement systems and techniques operations in marine oceanography and climatology necessary for the design, exploitation and management of port areas and infrastructures.
- The planning, coordination and control of the Spanish maritime signaling system, and the promotion of training, research and technological development in these matters.

The coordination in maritime signaling is carried out through the Lighthouses Commission.

== Spanish Ports System ==
According to the Royal Legislative Decree 2/2011, the system consists of two types of ports; the ports of regional ownership, which depend on the governments of the Autonomous Communities where they are located and the ports of State ownership, that is, the ports qualified as of general interest for gathering some of the following features:

=== Characteristics of ports of general interest ===
1. That international maritime commercial activities take place in them.
2. That its area of commercial influence affects significantly more than one Autonomous Community.
3. That serve industries or establishments of strategic importance for the economy of the Nation.
4. That the annual volume and the characteristics of its maritime commercial activities reach sufficiently relevant levels or respond to essential needs of the general economic activity of the State.
5. That due to their special technical or geographical conditions constitute essential elements for the safety of maritime traffic, especially in the islands (mainly the Canary and Balearic Islands).

=== Members of State's Ports ===
The Spanish State Port System is composed of 46 ports of general interest, managed by 28 Port authorities, whose coordination and efficiency control corresponds to the Ports of the State company, a body under the Ministry of Public Works that is responsible for the execution of the Government's ports policy. Port activity and maritime transport contribute 20% to the GDP of the transport sector. The Law provides the Spanish port system with the necessary instruments to improve its competitive position in an open and globalized market, establishing a management autonomy regime for the Port Authorities, which must exercise their activity with business criteria.

=== Spanish Port Authority Model ===
Within this framework, it is intended that the management of ports of general interest respond to the so-called "landlord" model, in which the Port Authority is limited to being a provider of infrastructure and port land and to regulate the use of this public domain, while the services are mainly provided by private operators under authorization or concession regime.

== Structure of the port system ==
The 28 port authorities are:

- AP La Coruña
- AP Alicante
- AP Almería
- AP Avilés
- AP Baleares
- AP Barcelona
- AP Bilbao
- AP Cartagena
- AP Castellón
- AP Ceuta
- AP Ferrol-S.Cibrao
- AP Gijón
- AP Huelva
- AP Bahía de Algeciras
- AP Bahía de Cádiz
- AP Las Palmas
- AP Málaga
- AP Marín y Ría de Pontevedra
- AP Melilla
- AP Motril
- AP Pasajes
- AP Santa Cruz de Tenerife
- AP Santander
- AP Sevilla
- AP Tarragona
- AP Valencia
- AP Vigo
- AP Villagarcía de Arosa
