= Port of Tarragona =

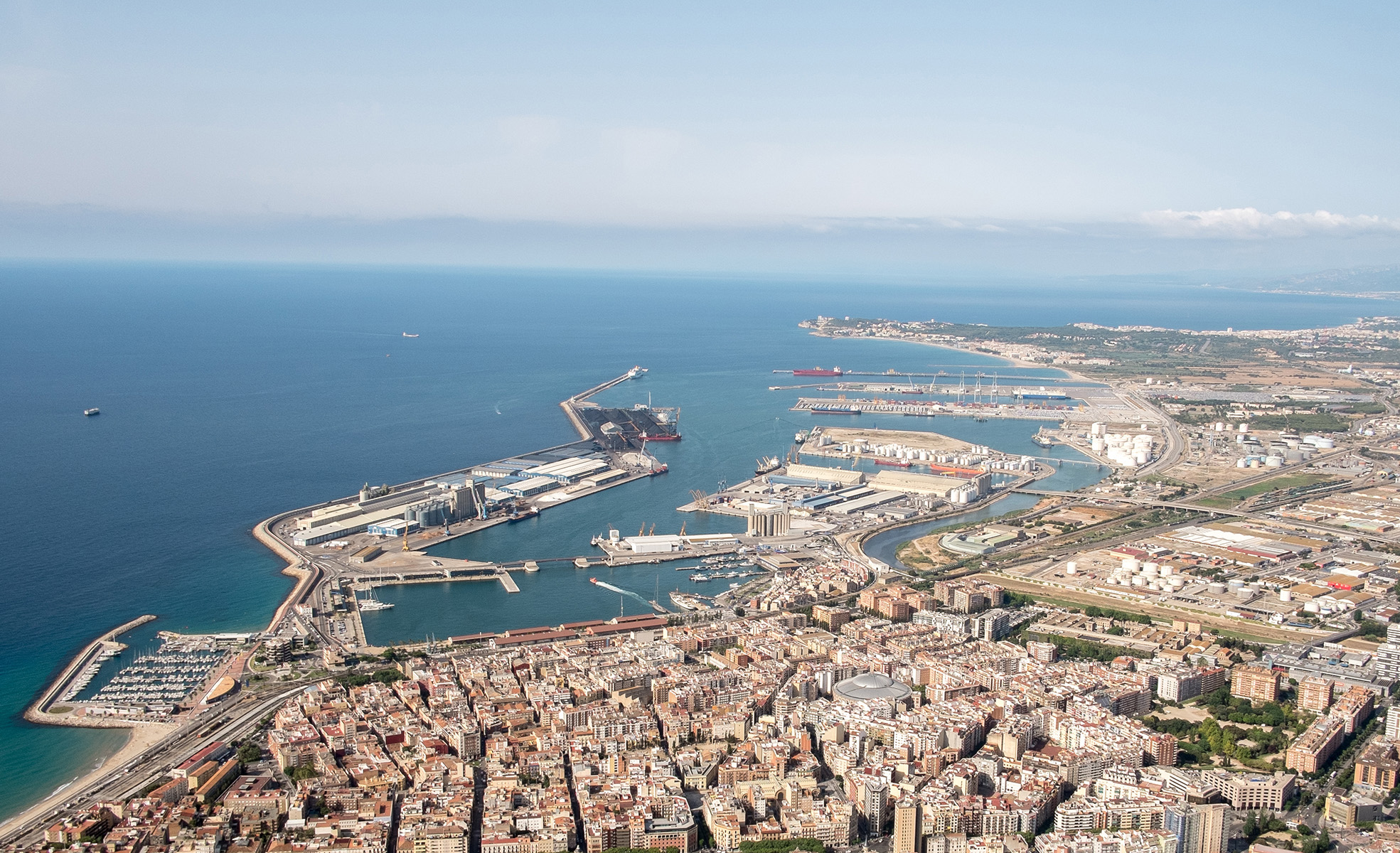
- Aerial View
- Click on the map for a fullscreen view

Location
- Country: Spain
- Location: Tarragona, Catalonia
- Coordinates: 41°06′15″N 1°14′08″E

Details
- Operated by: Port Authority of Tarragona

Statistics
- Annual cargo tonnage: 32.33 million tonnes (2024)

The Port of Tarragona is a major port in Catalonia, Spain, constituting one of the ports of general interest of the State-owned port management company Puertos del Estado (PdE). It is operated by the Port Authority of Tarragona (Autoritat Portuària de Tarragona). It lies near the mouth of the Francolí river, in Tarragona.

== History ==
Romans built a port in Tarraco, which declined in Late Antiquity. During the Islamic era the city was reduced to a minor settlement or military garrison which was eventually forsaken by the 10th century. The early mention to the port in the 11th century attests the city's seafaring character after the Christian conquest. After the Reapers' War, Tarragona ceded its status as the second exporting port of Catalonia to the neighboring port of Salou. Works for a new port started in 1790. Mason workers included prisoners drafted from the Prison of Cartagena, as well as workers from Barcelona, Zaragoza, Burgos, Madrid, and Ceuta. Up until the late 19th century, the remains of the Roman jetty entailed an obstacle in the harbour. The port's traffic grew considerably in the 1960s and 1970s because of the development of the petrochemical industry nearby. By 2024, it ranked as the most relevant port in Spain in terms of agricultural products, and it is also notable for its role in the petrochemical industry, coal, and cars, while it ranks as the top fishing port in Catalonia.
