= MARMOK-A-5 =

Offshore electrical power generator

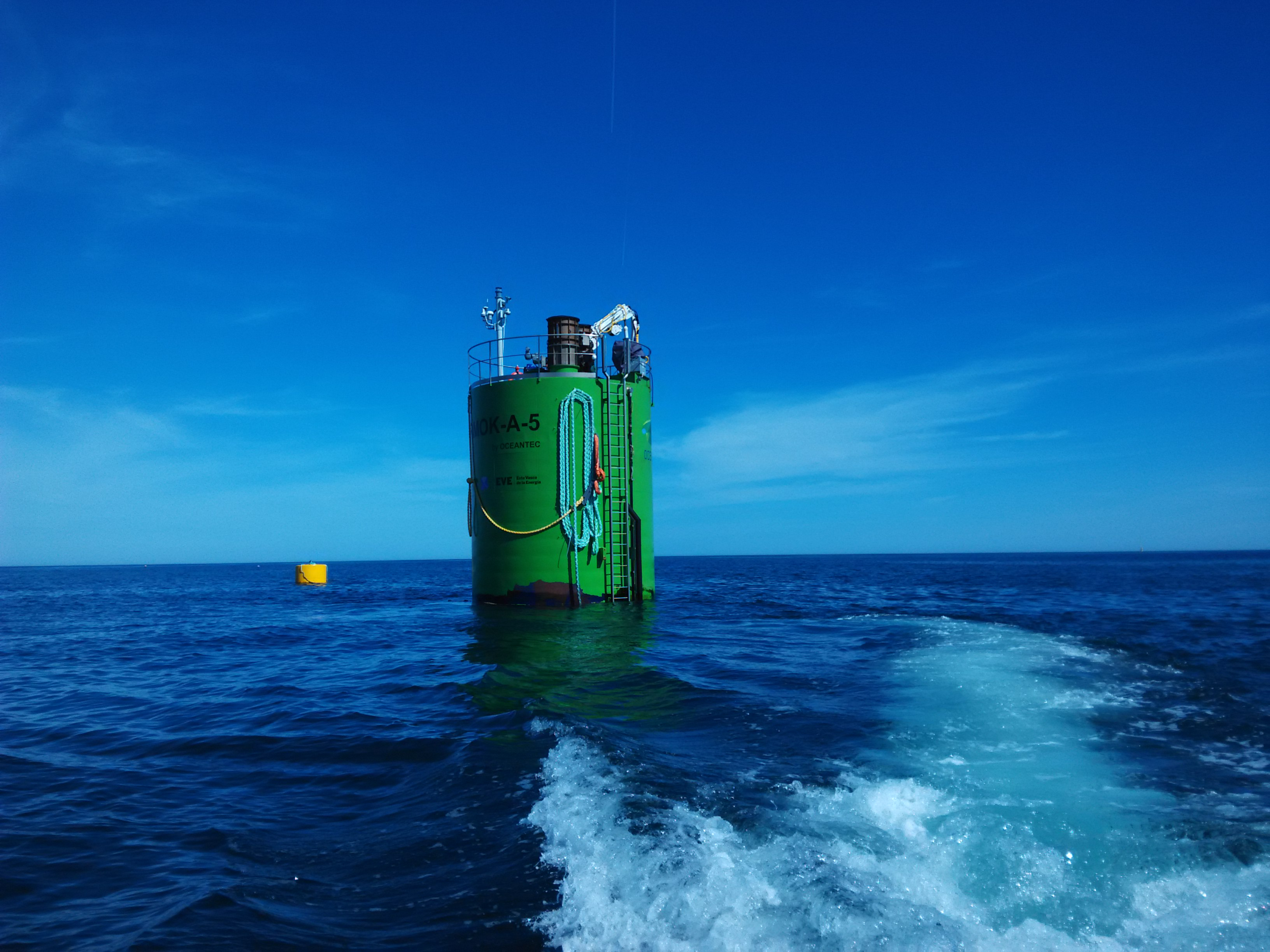

MARMOK-A-5 is an offshore electric generator that uses wave power (energy) to create electricity. This device is a spar buoy installed in the maritime testing site Biscay Marine Energy Platform (BiMEP), in the Bay of Biscay north of Bilbao, Spain, in Spanish territorial waters. It is the first maritime generator connected to mains electricity, also termed the electrical grid, in Spain, and one of the first in the world.

Developed by the Basque company Oceantec Energias Marinas inside the European project Open Sea Wave Operating Experience to Reduce Energy Cost (OPERA), it is delivering electrical energy to the grid since December 2016. The buoy is located in the ocean, 4 km (0 mi) from the coastline and is connected to the sea with a submarine electrical cable. With a nominal power of 30 kW, the main aim of the MARMOK-A-5 device is obtaining results to help design a new generation cost effective high power marine energy generator.

== Principle ==
The operating principle of MARMOK-A-5 is a point absorber oscillating Water column (OWC). The device is 5 m (20 ft) in diameter and 42 m (140 ft) long (or high), with 6 m (20 ft) above the water. It has a weight of 79 t (90 short tons). The buoy is floating in around 90 m water depth and is tied to the sea bed with a mooring system based on anchors. This wave energy converter has demonstrated its robustness surviving difficult environmental conditions with waves as big as 14 m (50 ft).

The Karratu mooring system used is one cell of a shared mooring system. This is designed to allow each device to move freely while reducing the number of moorings needed for an array or wave farm, thereby reducing costs.

== History ==
the concept was initially developed by Oceantec within the European OPERA project. The 30 kW device was first deployed in October 2016 until June 2018, when it was refurbished and redeployed in October 2018 for another year. The device was installed in approximately 85 m (280 ft) water depth.

In 2018, Oceantec was acquired by Spanish engineering company IDOM of Bilbao.

=== Further development in EuropeWave programme ===
IDOM were one of seven companies awarded pre-commercial procurement funding in December 2021 for Stage 1 of the EuropeWave programme, to further develop the device concept. (Note: "Pre-commercial procurement" concerns the commissioning of research and development delivery in advance of production becoming commercially feasible.) In September 2022, they progressed to Stage 2 with added funding for a front-end loading (or front-end engineering and design) study of a scale-prototype to be tested at sea. IDOM were one of three concepts that progressed to Stage 3, with a share of the €13.4m budget to develop and test a device at BiMEP for a year.

In December 2024, IDOM announced plans to re-deploy the MARMOK-A-5 at BiMEP in summer 2025, however this was delayed. The device was successfully re-deployed and connected to the grid in May 2026. It features an improved intelligent control system and onboard batteries.
