= IDOM (company) =

Multi-national corporation

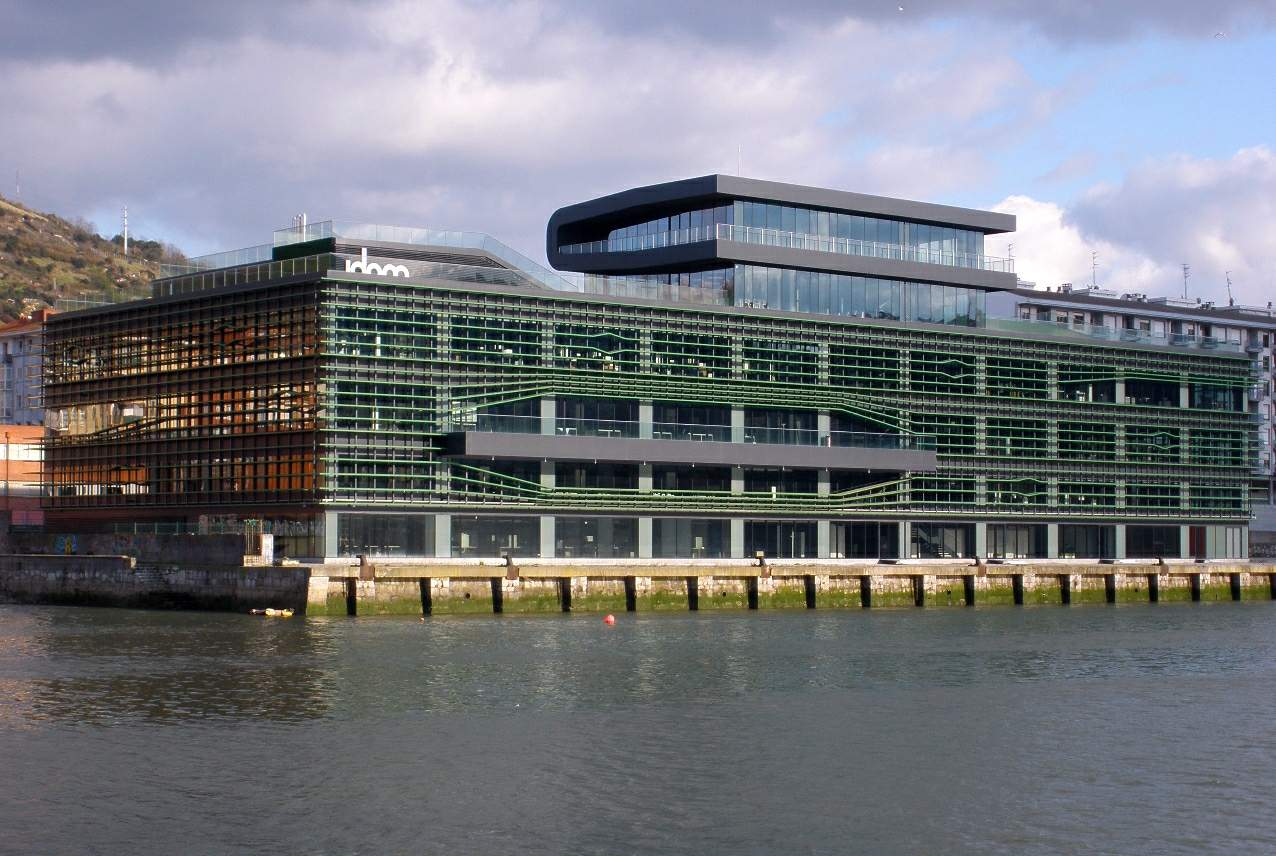
- Company HQ in Bilbao, Spain
- Founded: 1957
- Founder: Rafael Escolá
- Headquarters: Bilbao, Biscay, Spain
- Area served: Worldwide
- Key people: Luis Rodríguez Llopis (CEO)
- Services: Industry and Energy, Infrastructures, Consulting, Architecture
- Net income: ▲350 million € (2016)
- Number of employees: 3,500
- Website: www.idom.com

IDOM is a multi-national corporation which provides consulting, engineering, and architecture services in Spain and internationally.

From 1957 to the present day, IDOM has gradually developed into a multidisciplinary group in which more than 3,000 people work, distributed in 34 offices located in seventeen countries and five continents, having served more than 12,000 clients and carrying out 30,000 projects in 123 countries.

== History ==
IDOM (from the Spanish: Ingeniería y Dirección de Obras y Montaje) was founded in 1957 by Rafael Escolá (1919-1995), with the help of another young engineer, Luis Olaortúa (1932-2003).

=== Wave energy ===
In 2018, IDOM acquired the wave power developer Oceantec, that is developing the MARMOK-A-5 device, an oscillating water column type.
