= SS Cabo Machichaco =

Steamship whose cargo of dynamite exploded in Santander, Spain in 1893 and 1894

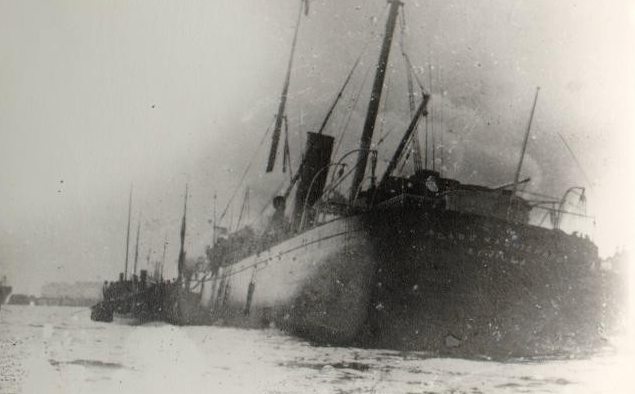
- Cabo Machichaco in Santander Harbour after the first explosion

History
- Name: 1882: Benisaf; 1886: Cabo Machichaco
- Namesake: 1882: Béni Saf
- Owner: 1882: Jules Mesnier; 1886: Ybarra y Compañía
- Port of registry: 1882: (France) Le Havre; 1886: (Spain) Seville
- Route: 1886: Bilbao – Marseille
- Builder: Schlesinger, Davis & Co, Wallsend
- Yard number: 121
- Launched: January 1882
- Identification: 1886: code letters LFDB
- Fate: Destroyed by cargo explosions in 1893 and 1894

General characteristics
- Type: cargo ship
- Tonnage: 1,689 GRT, 1,148 NRT
- Length: 260.0 ft (79.2 m)
- Beam: 33.7 ft (10.3 m)
- Depth: 19.4 ft (5.9 m)
- Installed power: 200 NHP
- Propulsion: 2-cylinder compound engine
- Speed: 8 knots (15 km/h)
- Crew: 35
- Notes: sister ship: Lavrion

Cabo Machichaco was an iron-hulled cargo steamship that was built in England in 1882 as Benisaf, and renamed Cabo Machichaco in 1886. She was destroyed by two explosions in her cargo in 1893 and 1894 in the port of Santander, Spain. The first explosion killed several hundred people in the city of Santander as well as on the ship, and was Spain's worst peacetime disaster in the 19th century. The second explosion killed a number of workers who were salving the remainder of her cargo from her sunken wreck.

== Building and owners ==
Schlesinger, Davis and Company of Wallsend, North East England, built a pair of cargo ships, yard numbers 120 and 121, for Jules Mesnier, a French ship owner. 120 was launched on 6 December 1881 as Lavrion. 121 was launched her in January 1882 as Benisaf. Benisaf's registered length was 260.0 ft (79.2 m), her beam was 33.7 ft (10.3 m) and her depth was 19.4 ft (5.9 m). She had three holds, and her tonnages were 1,689 GRT and 1,148 NRT.

Benisaf's engine room, stokehold, bridge and single funnel were amidships, between her number two and three holds. She had a single screw, driven by a two-cylinder compound steam engine built by R and W Hawthorn of Newcastle upon Tyne. The engine was rated at 200 NHP and gave her a speed of 8 knots (15 km/h). She had two masts, one forward of her bridge and the other aft. She was rigged as a brigantine.

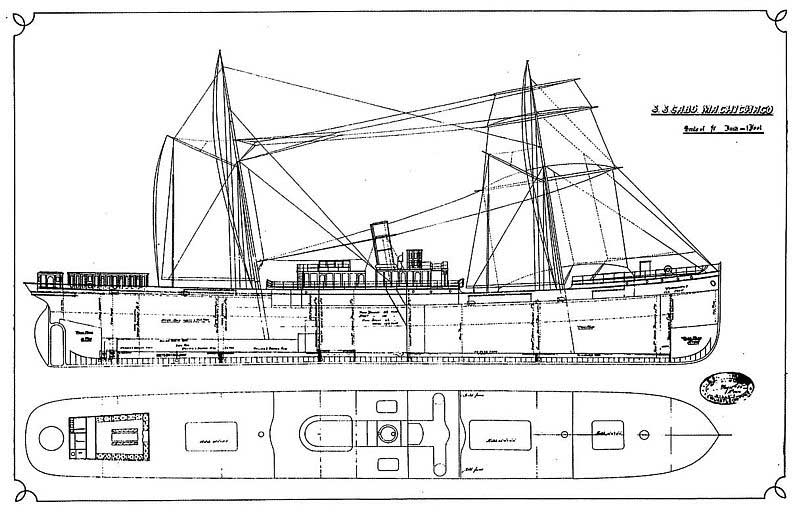
Plan and longitudinal section of Benisaf

Mesnier registered Benisaf in Le Havre, France. She was named after the town of Béni Saf on the coast of what was then French Algeria. Mesnier may have used her as a collier.

In 1886 Ybarra y Compañía bought both Lavrion and Benisaf, and renamed them Cabo Mayor and Cabo Machichaco respectively. Ybarra registered Cabo Machichaco in Seville, Spain. Her code letters were LFDB. Ybarra named many of its ships after headlands. Both Cabo Mayor and Cabo Machichaco are on the north coast of Spain. Cabo Mayor is near the entrance of the Bay of Santander in Cantabria. Cabo Machichaco is near Bermeo in the Basque Country.

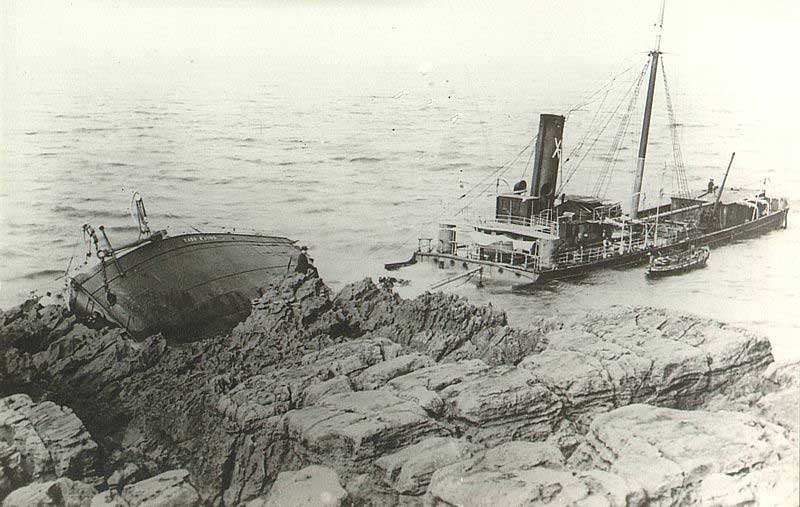
Cabo Machichaco's sister ship Cabo Mayor, wrecked on the rocks of Cabo Mayor in 1886

Cabo Mayor and Cabo Machichaco became two of seven ships that Ybarra employed on its liner cargo service between Bilbao and Marseille via intermediate ports. But soon after joining Ybarra's fleet, on 4 September 1886, Cabo Mayor ran onto rocks on her namesake and became a total loss.

== Cargo fire ==
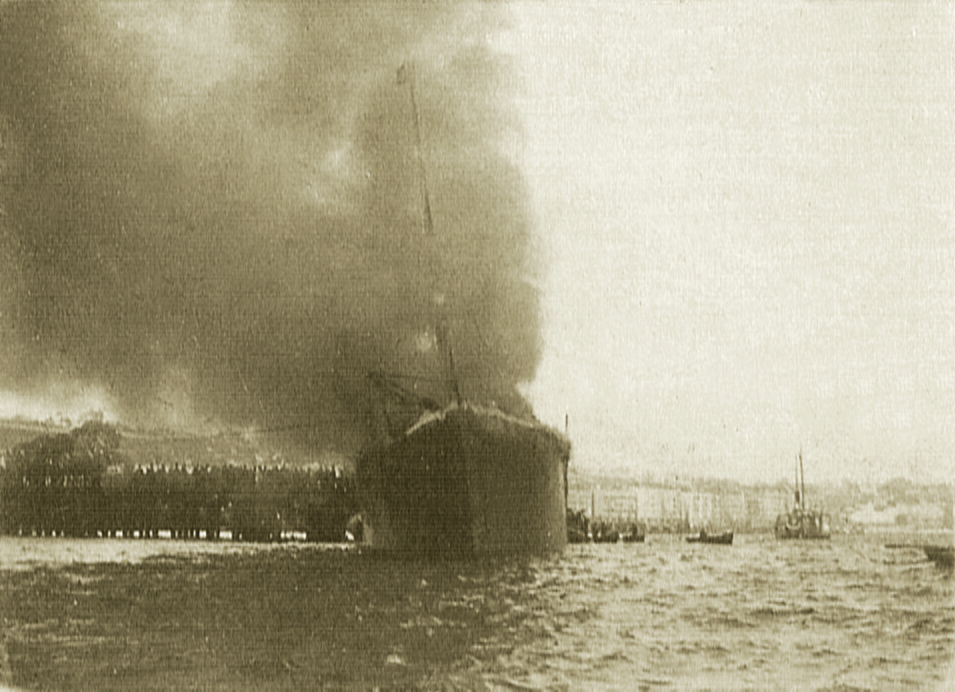
Cabo Machichaco on fire, before the first explosion

On 24 October 1893 Cabo Machichaco left Bilbao carrying cargo including iron bars, strips, ingots, and other iron goods, tinplate, flour, wine, paper, tobacco, wood and other items. Her cargo included more than 51 tonnes of dynamite packed in 1,720 boxes, and 12 tonnes of sulphuric acid in 20 glass flasks carried as deck cargo. About 40 tons of dynamite was in her two forward holds, and about 11 tons was in her number three hold. Most of the dynamite was destined for Seville and Cartagena, but 20 boxes were to be unloaded at Santander.

Spanish law forbade any cargo ship to carry more than 43 tonnes of dynamite. And since 1889, the regulations of the Port of Santander restricted the unloading of dynamite to locations as far as possible from the city. It had to be either transhipped to barges off the Magdalena Peninsula, or landed at piers 7 and 8 at Maliaño. Unloading it in the main port within the city of Santander was forbidden.

In October 1893 cholera had broken out in Bilbao. Therefore Cabo Machichaco was required to spend ten days at anchor in quarantine before entering Santander. On the morning of 3 November she entered port, and about 0700 hrs she docked at Pier 1, which was a timber jetty in the centre of the city's waterfront that extended about 160 ft (50 m) from the shore. Unloading cargo began about 0800 hrs. 29 tonnes of paper was transhipped to another ship, Navarro, which was moored nearby.

About 1400 hrs smoke was seen coming from Cabo Machichaco's number two hold. Her crew used a pump and hose to fight the fire. Santander's municipal fire service came to lead the fight against the fire. Passers-by started to gather on the waterfront to watch the spectacle. About 1445 hrs seven members of the crew of the steamship Vizcaya joined the fight against the fire, but by 1500 hrs holds one and two were still ablaze. Cabo Machichaco's Captain, Facundo Léniz, decided to flood the holds, sinking the forepart of the ship, to extinguish the fire. This would also flood the engine room and stokehold, which would shut down the engine and disable Cabo Machichaco's steam-powered equipment, including pumps, winches and windlass.

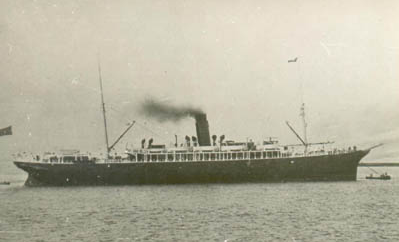
The CTE ocean liner Alfonso XIII

A Compañía Transatlántica Española ocean liner, Alfonso XIII, was in port. About 1600 hrs her Master, Captain Francisco Jaureguizar y Cagigal, with one of his officers and about 40 of his crew came alongside Cabo Machichaco in a steam launch to help. Members of the crew of other ships then in port also came to help, including from Pinillos Sáenz's ocean liner Catalina, British merchant ship Eden and French ship Galindo. The effort now was not only to fight the fire, but also to salve items from Cabo Machichaco in case the fire spread further through the ship. The crew launched her lifeboats to save them from being destroyed.

== First explosion ==
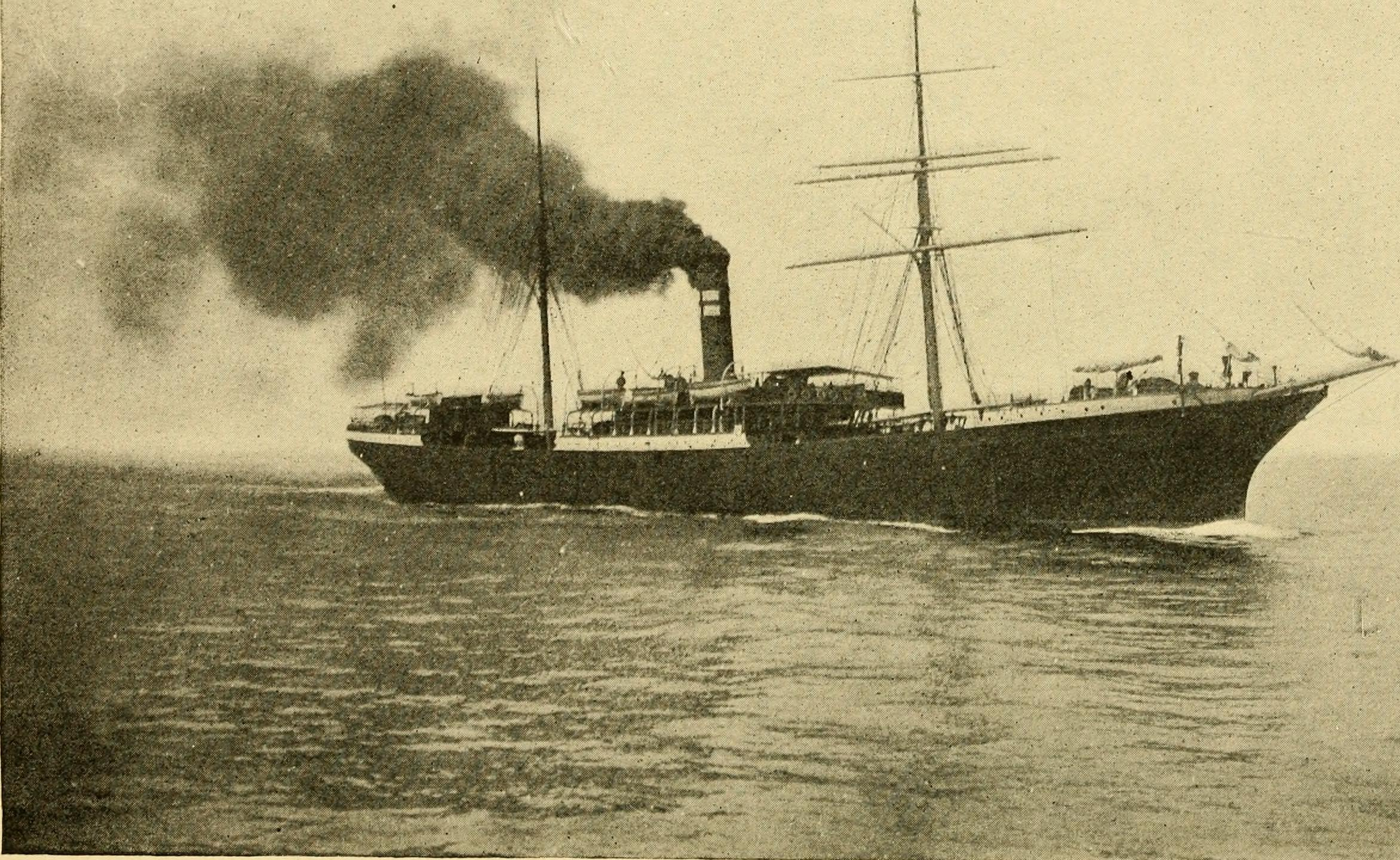
The Pinillos Sáenz liner Catalina

In order to sink the ship quickly enough, the plan was to use sledgehammers and cold chisels to open a hole in the port side of her hull. At about 1645 hrs, only minutes after men started work with the sledgehammers, the dynamite in her number two hold exploded. The initial force of the explosion was upward, killing everyone on the forward part of the ship, including all the officers and men who had come from Alfonso XIII, but not the half of the crew who were salvaging items aft of the superstructure. Captain Léniz and about half of his crew were killed, including all his officers except the Chief Engineer.

The explosion destroyed the forepart of the ship almost entirely, and threw iron parts of the ship and her cargo high in the air, along with hundreds of tonnes of mud and water from the port. Some of the iron pieces weighed up to 660 lb (300 kg). Most of the débris landed within a 2,300 ft (700 m) radius, but some items landed up to 3 mi (5 km) away. A news report claimed that one of ship's anchors landed destroying a house 800 yd (730 m) away. The explosion was so powerful that it caused an earth tremor.

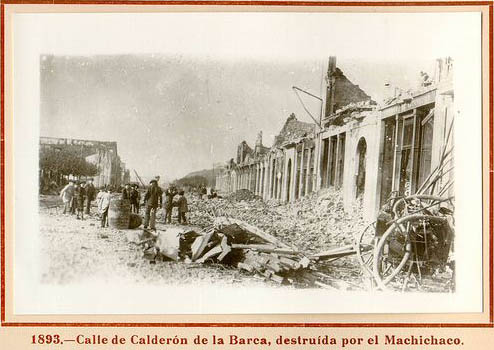
Buildings wrecked by the first explosion

By now the crowd of people watching the fire may have numbered 3,000 to 4,000, and they were standing within 660 ft (200 m) of the ship. In total about 300 people were killed instantly, and this number nearly doubled in the following weeks as people succumbed to their injuries. The most common cause of death was falling débris. A smaller number were killed by blast injuries. Drowning after being blown into the water was another cause of death. Between 65 and 70 buildings were also destroyed. The explosion sent waves through the water of the harbour that sank several boats that were near the ship.

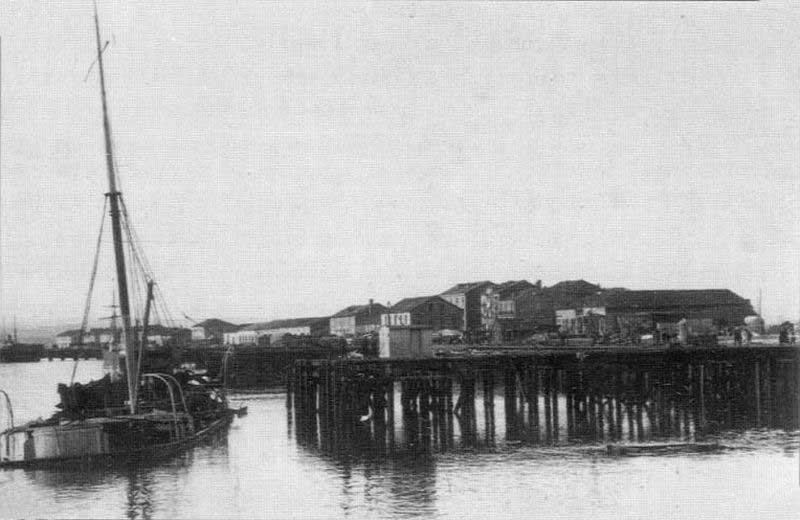
Cabo Machichaco after the first explosion

Those killed included most of Santander's firefighters. Much of the flying débris was either hot or on fire, and started fires in surrounding buildings. Firefighters came from Bilbao, San Sebastián and elsewhere in the province to fight the fires. 27 of the city's 29 members of the Guardia Civil were also killed. The Governor of Santander and Arturo Pombo y Villamerie, Marqués de Casa Pombo, were also killed, and the city's administration was paralysed. The Spanish Government sent its Minister of Finance, Germán Gamazo, to take charge.

Spanish Army troops were sent to clear débris and human remains on land, and at first surface-supplied divers were deployed to recover human remains from the harbour. But the divers became so distressed at the large number of the dead in the water, and the extent of their injuries, that they successfully pleaded to be released from the task. They were replaced by people in boats using grappling hooks.

== Second explosion ==
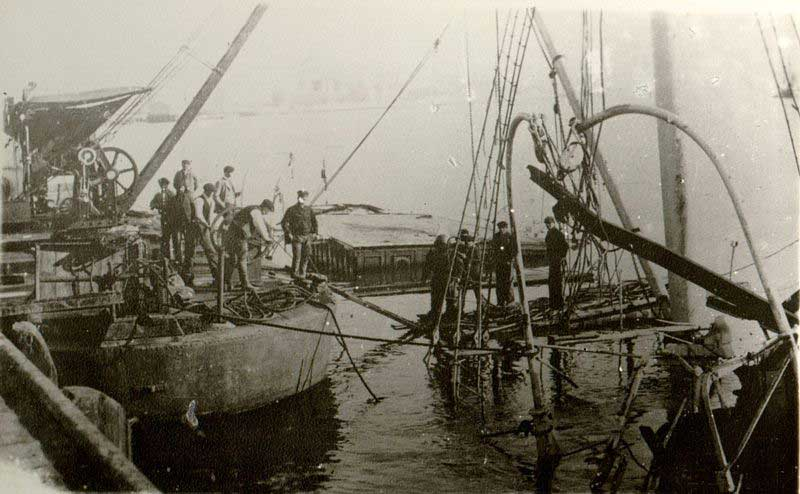
Salvage work on the wreck after the first explosion

The first explosion left about 11 tonnes of dynamite in Cabo Machichaco's number three hold, unexploded, but under water and leaking nitroglycerin. On 15 March 1894, four months after the first explosion, a "technical board" of navy, army and civil experts arrived in Santander to try to solve the problem. The next day the board decided that the cargo, including the dynamite, should be salved, with salvage divers working at night.

On 21 March a diver started work in number three hold about 2000 hrs. At about 2110 hrs there was an explosion that killed at least 18 people and injured another seven. It also destroyed much of the equipment that the Harbour Board was using in the salvage operation.

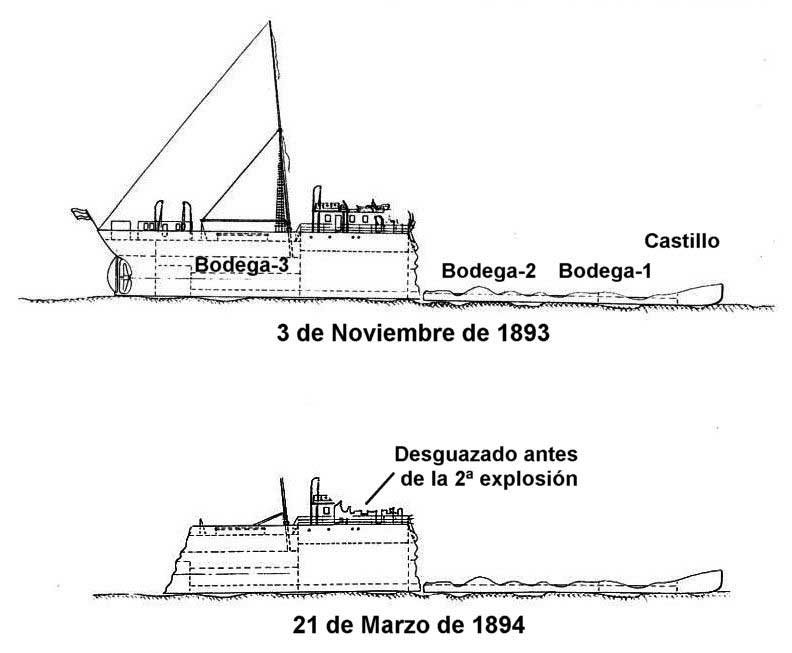
Damage to Cabo Machichaco after the first and second explosions

The second explosion provoked public disorder. People tried to attack the homes of the Civil Governor and the engineer in charge of the salvage work. Much of Santander's population attended the funeral of the 18 victims, which was held on 24 March. After they left the cemetery, some of the crowd threw stones at Ybarra's office in Santander. A detachment of Guardia Civil responded with fixed bayonets and firing shots in the air. It was reported that "many civilians and a few soldiers [i.e. Guardia] were injured". After the Guardia drove them away from the company office, some of the crowd went to the harbour, where they cut the hawsers on an Ybarra ship that was moored there.

On 30 March 1894 the Spanish Navy gunboat Condor used explosive charges to disperse the remains of Cabo Machichaco's wreck. In 1947 the quay was extended out into deeper water. Before building began the area was dredged, and part of Cabo Machichaco's bow was found.

== Monument ==
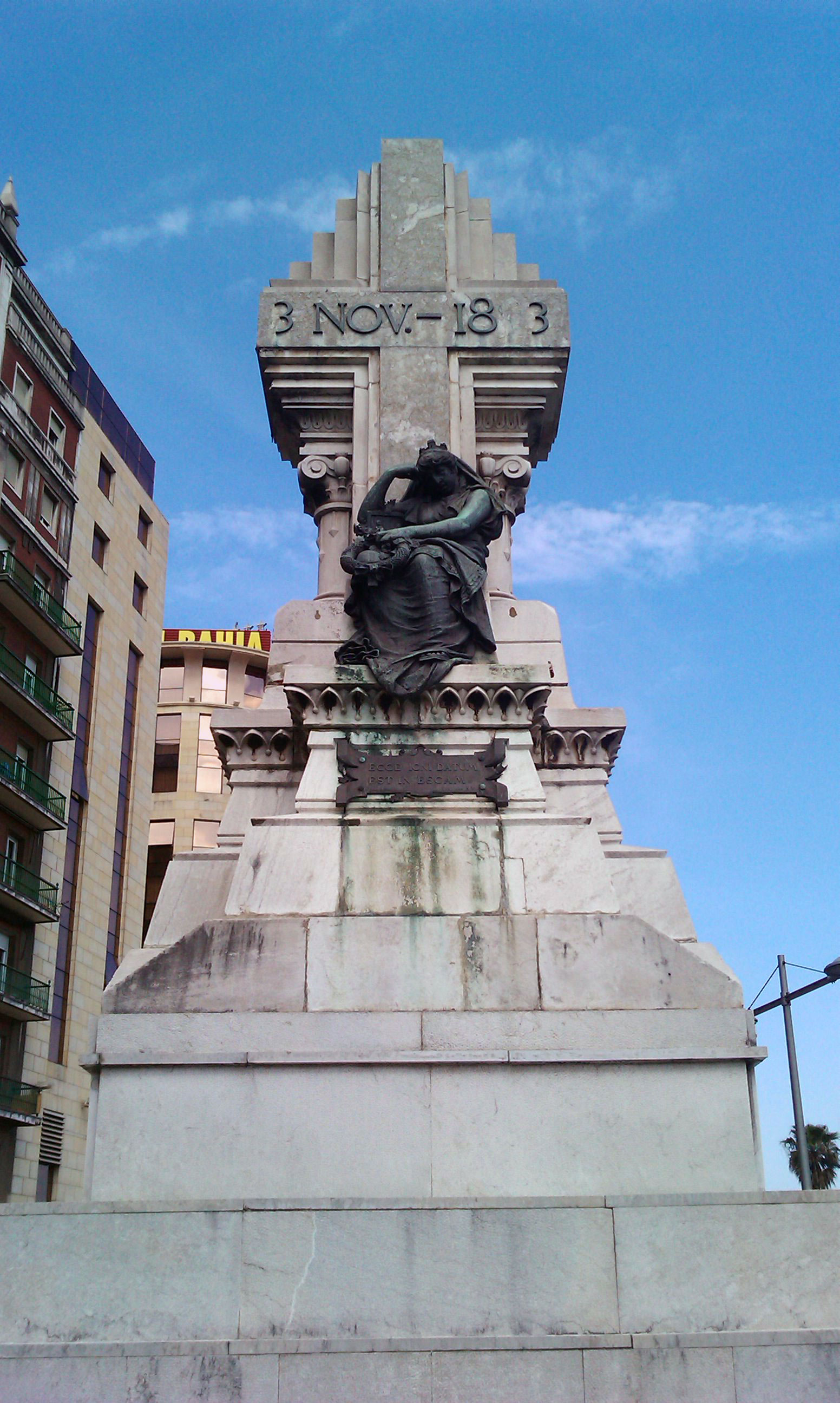
Monument in Plaza Machichaco, Santander

In 1896 a monument was erected on the waterfront of Santander near where the ship exploded. It is a thick stone cross designed by Santander's then municipal architect, Valentín Casalís, with the dates of the two explosions on either side. On one side of the cross is a bronze sculpture of a grieving woman by Cipriano Doiztúa. The monument stands in an open space that is now called Plaza del Machichaco. Santander City Council holds a commemoration ceremony at the monument on 3 November every year.

== See also ==
- 1941 Santander fire
- List of accidents and incidents involving transport or storage of ammunition
- List of maritime disasters

== Bibliography ==
- Jar Torre, Luis (November 2009). "Un Desastre a la Española". Revista General de Marina (in Spanish) – via páginas personales de Juan Manuel Grijalvo.
- Lloyd's Register of British and Foreign Shipping. Vol. I–Steamers. London: Lloyd's Register of Shipping. 1885 – via Internet Archive.
- Lloyd's Register of British and Foreign Shipping. Vol. I–Steamers. London: Lloyd's Register of Shipping. 1891 – via Internet Archive.
