= Hermandad de las Marismas =

The Brotherhood of the Villas of the Navy of Castile with Vitoria, or simply the Brotherhood of the Marshes (Hermandad de las Marismas), was a federation of the main ports of the Cantabrian Sea that formed a first-rate naval power at the service of the Crown of Castile, maintaining autonomy in its international trade relations and, in some cases, even engaging in military confrontations with the kingdoms of France and England.

== History ==
The Brotherhood of the Marshes was founded on 4 May 1296 by Cantabrian and Basque coastal towns such as Santander, Laredo, Castro-Urdiales, Bermeo, Guetaria, San Sebastián, Fuenterrabía and Vitoria (later joined by San Vicente de la Barquera in 1297). It was formed to defend their common interests against the Crown, preserve the privileges they had gained during the Reconquista and regulate trade with France, England and Flanders, avoiding internal and external conflicts. Based in Castro-Urdiales, the brotherhood acted as a mercantile league similar to the Hanseatic League, participating in conflicts such as the Hundred Years' War (supporting France in 1338-1339), signing agreements with England (1351), resisting royal impositions (1450) and even intervening in the Wars of the Roses. It disappeared under the Catholic Monarchs in 1494 when the Consulate of Burgos was created, although in 1481 it still offered ships for the fight against the Ottoman Empire

== Bibliography ==
- Solórzano Telechea, Jesús Ángel (2009–2010). ""Las Neireidas del Norte": puertos de identidad urbana en la fachada Cantábrica entre los siglos XII-XV" (PDF). Anales de la Universidad de Alicante. Historia medieval (16): 39–61. ISSN 0212-2480. Archived from the original (PDF) on 1 September 2014.
