= Port of Bilbao =

Port in Biscay, Spain

Port of Bilbao Puerto de Bilbao / Bilboko portua
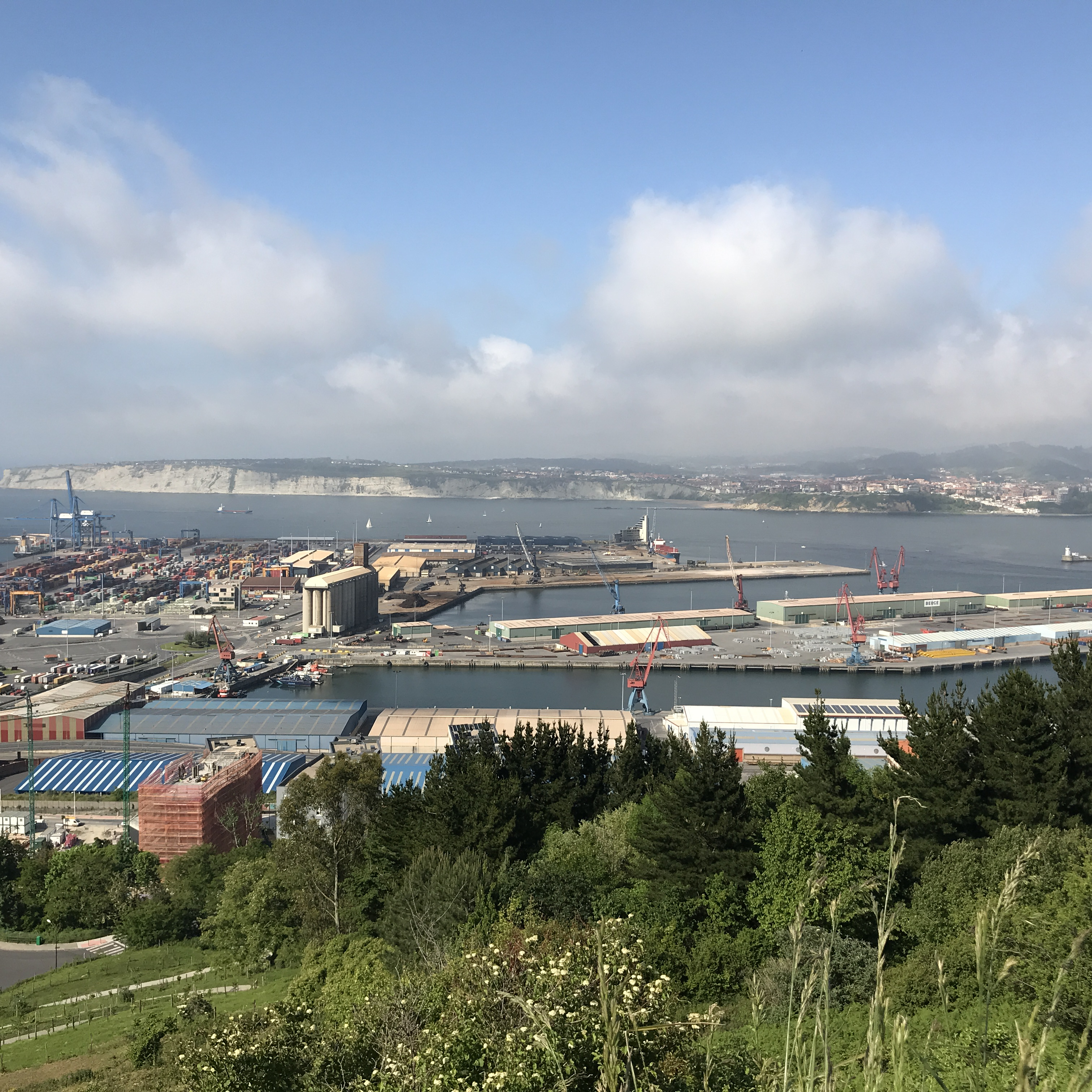
- The Port of Bilbao
- Click on the map for a fullscreen view

Location
- Country: Spain
- Location: Bilbao, Basque Country
- Coordinates: 43.3524°N 3.0489°W

Details
- Opened: 1300
- Operated by: Ports of the State
- Owned by: Bilbaoport
- Type of harbour: International
- Size: 17 km

Statistics
- Annual cargo tonnage: 32.1 million tonnes (2016)
- Annual container volume: 596,688 TEU (2016)
- Value of cargo: 65.2 million EUR (2016)
- Website https://www.bilbaoport.eus

The Port of Bilbao is located on the Bilbao Abra bay, and along the Estuary of Bilbao, in Biscay (Basque Country). The main facilities are in the Santurtzi and Zierbena municipalities, approximately 15 km (9.3 mi) west of Bilbao. Also called Exterior Port and Superpuerto, the port complex occupies 3.13 km^{2} (773 acres) of land and 16.94 km^{2} (4,186 acres) of water along 17 km (10.6 mi) of waterfront.

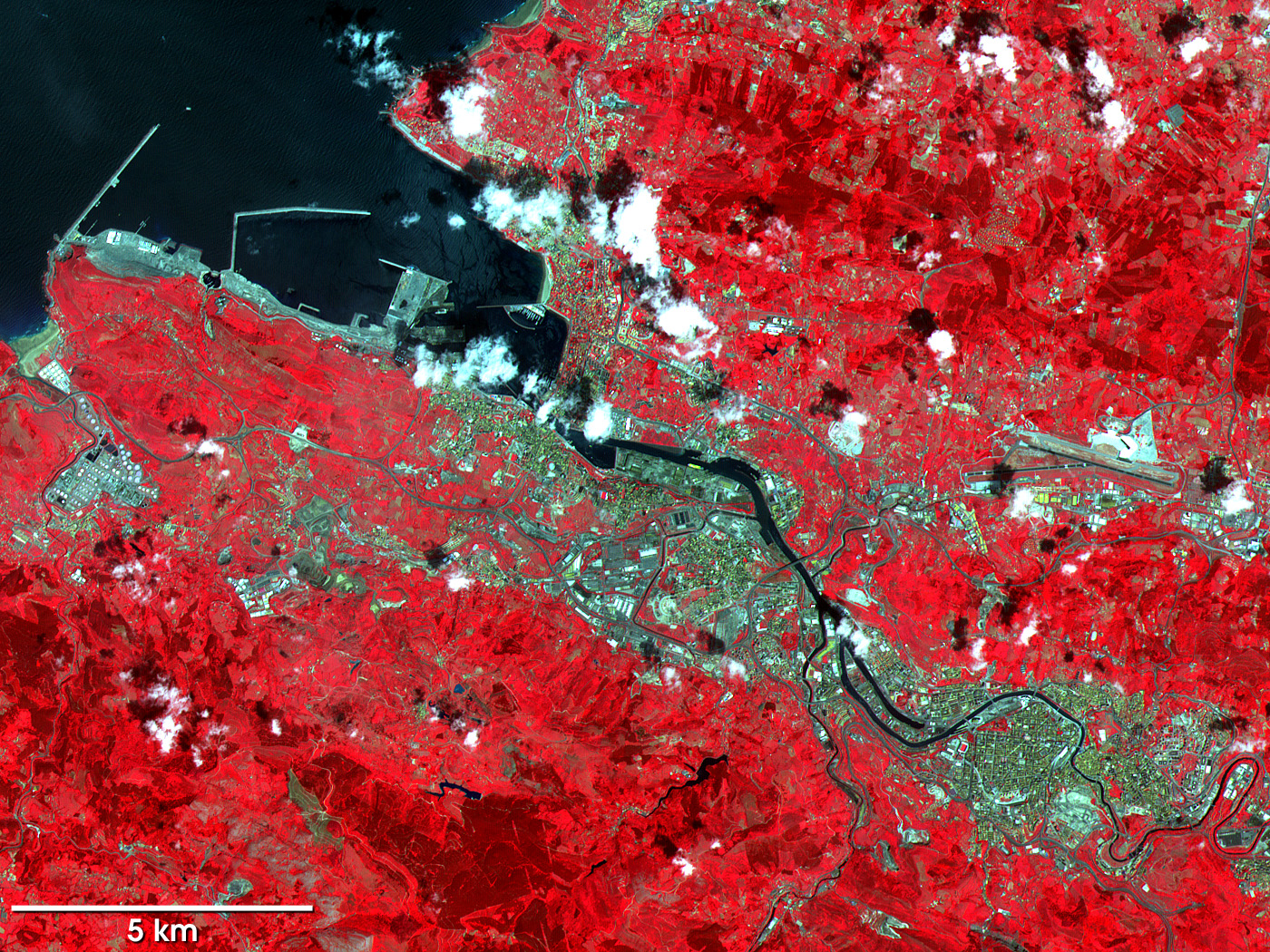
Port of Bilbao

== History ==
The history of the port is inseparably linked to the history of Bilbao itself, so the date of its foundation is also that of the city's foundation.

In 1300 Bilbao was granted the status of city and was given control of the maritime traffic entering its estuary. The first docks were built at Bilbao's old town, 15 km (9.3 mi) upstream from the open sea. These docks were the center of the port's activity for more than five centuries.

In 1511 the Consulate of Bilbao privilege was granted, which allowed the port control over the northern European wool export routes.

During the 19th century extensive iron ore deposites were discovered in the nearby hills, which boosted the area's industrial base. The estuary of Bilbao was covered by steel and shipbuilding industries and the docks expanded from Bilbao to the bay. All activity relied on the navigability of the river so engineer Evaristo Churruca developed an enormous project that would solve the traditional navigation problems of the river:

- dangerous sand banks that frequently altered the stream's course;
- several complicated meanders;
- extensive marshy area;
- storms blowing in from the Bay of Biscay that flooded the river's mouth.

The river banks were drained and docks were built, the river's course was straightened, the external port was enclosed, and the Puente Colgante transporter bridge was built. By 1900 Bilbao was Spain's biggest port. This allowed the fast development of the region's economy, and shipyards and steel mills covered the riverbanks. During the 1970s the Santurtzi area was developed and the Deusto channel was created.

But things continued to evolve, the industry decayed and docks were abandoned. On top of that, vessels have constantly increased their tonnage and large tankers and freighters could not enter the river anymore and the Santurtzi area became too congested. In 1975 a large project was conceived, known as the Superpuerto. The plan is for all of Abra Bay to eventually be enclosed by docks. The project continues today.

== Shipping ==
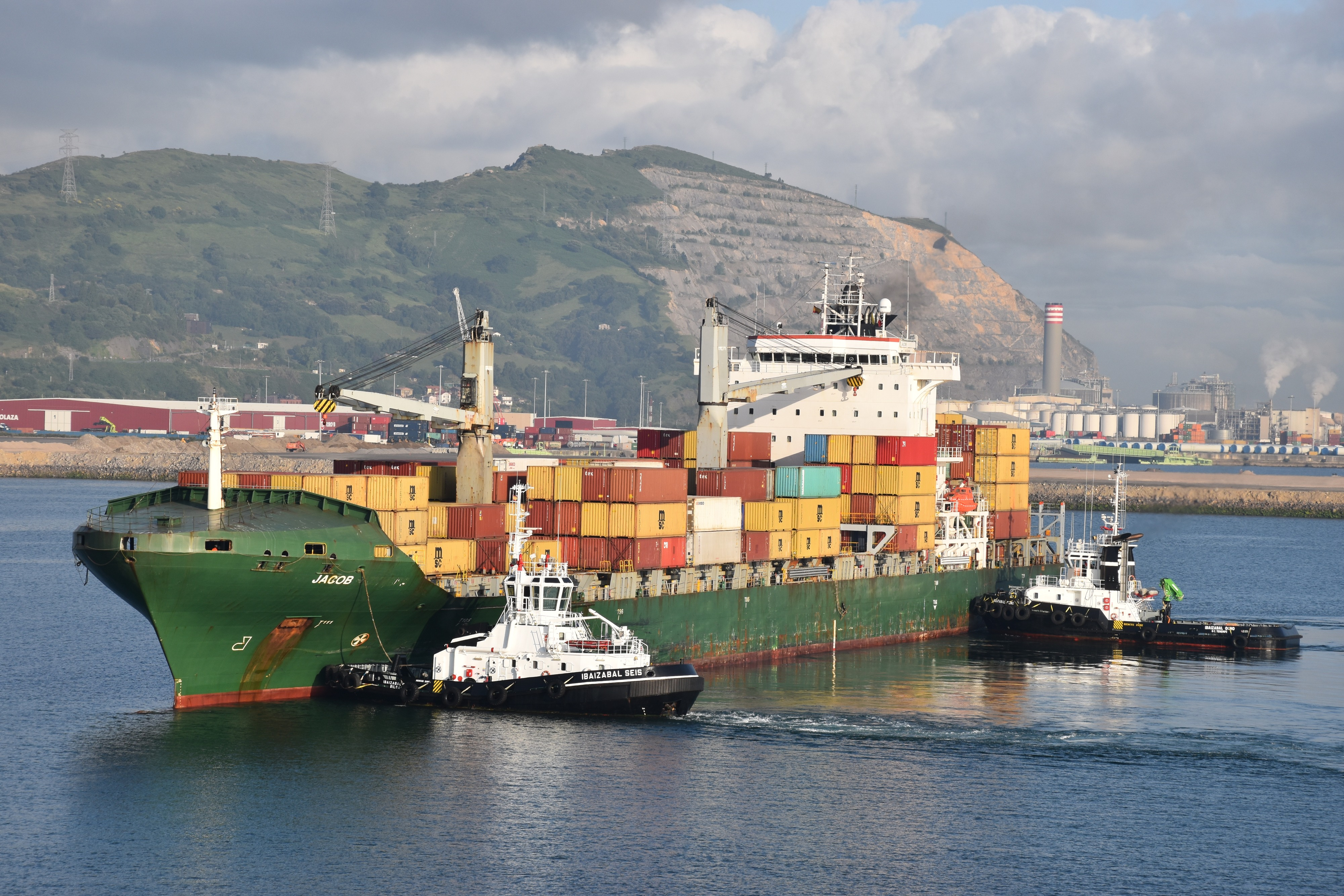
Container vessel arriving at Bilbao

The container volume was over half a million TEUs (twenty-foot equivalent units) in year 2007. The Port is the 4th busiest port in Spain after Algeciras, Barcelona and Valencia. It is Spain's largest port.

From 1998 to the present, the port's physical capacity has increased dramatically, which has led to increased traffic.

The port is served by the Renfe railway, but a new rail connection is needed because the current line is shared by commuter traffic and goes through a densely populated metropolitan area. A high speed connection is being considered, but Spain's current high-speed network does not support freight traffic.

== Cruise ships ==
A new dock was built in Getxo to meet the increasing demand in cruise ship traffic, fed largely by the opening of the Guggenheim Museum Bilbao in 1997, which has brought in many more tourists and put Bilbao on the cruising routes.

== Ferries ==
In September 2010, Brittany Ferries announced that it would take over the Portsmouth-Bilbao route, with the MV Cap Finistère. The service commenced on 27 March 2011, complementing the company's existing Portsmouth/Portsmouth International Port-Santander and Plymouth-Santander routes.

Between May 1993 and September 2010, P&O Ferries provided this service with the Pride of Bilbao.

Between May 2006 and January 2007, Acciona Trasmediterránea operated a service using the MV Fortuny.

== Destinations ==
- Portsmouth by Brittany Ferries
- Roscoff by Brittany Ferries
- Rosslare by Brittany Ferries

== Environment ==
There has been a lot of concern about the huge enlargement project of the exterior port. Ecologist movements protest because large portions of the bay are being covered by docks and the adjacent hills are being dynamited to get the raw materials used in the construction of the new docks.

== Statistics ==
Port Statistics
Year	Annual Cargo	Liquid	Containers	Passengers	Vessels	Cruises
2000	28,633,903	14,764,295	434,333	129,631	3,796
2001	27,100,442	14,325,857	454,382	134,954	3,845	17
2002	26,257,108	13,125,429	455,019	138,852	3,673	19
2003	28,099,276	15,662,945	453,763	111,622	3,458	17
2004	33,214,274	18,598,894	468,959	144,677	3.710	21
2005	34,100,494	19,684,506	503,811	177,795	3,583	21
2006	38,590,827	22,289,779	523,113	185,388	3,683	21
2007	40,014,326	22,682,181	554,568	172,626	3,595	21
2008	39,397,938	23,057,334	557,355	179,572	3,585	38

- Annual Cargo: In tons
- Liquid: Liquid cargo (in tons) at the port, including petroleum and LNG at Petronor and BBG
- Containers: ATM and TMB terminals. Measured in TEUs
- Passengers: Passengers transported by the MV Cap Finistère of Brittany Ferries to Portsmouth
- Vessels: Vessels that berthed at the port
- Cruises: Cruise ships berthed in Getxo. Note that prior to 2006 cruises anchored in Santurtzi.
