= Diocese of Santander =

Roman Catholic diocese in Spain

Diocese of Santander Dioecesis Santanderiensis Diócesis de Santander

Catholic
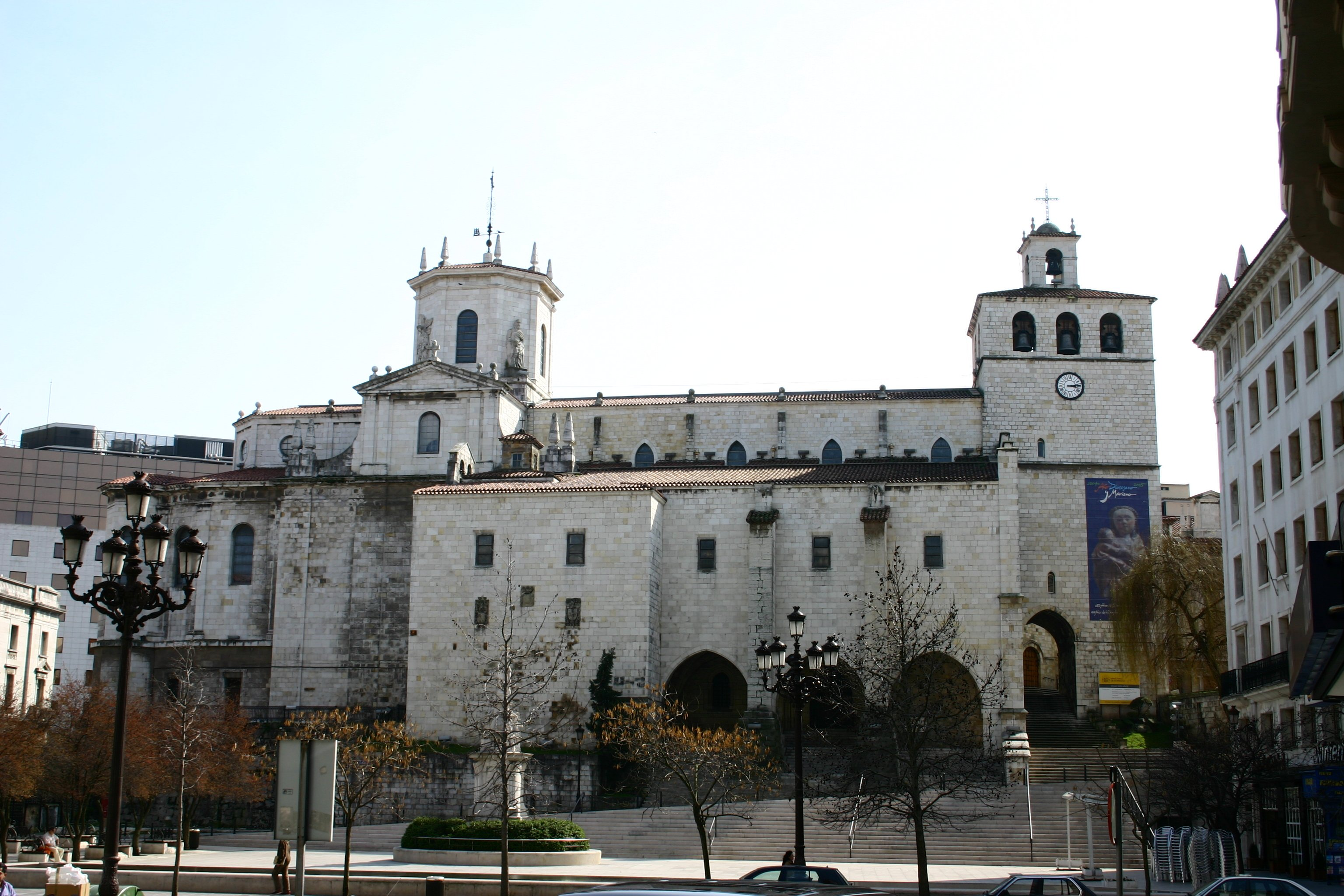
- Santander Cathedral

Location
- Country: Spain
- Ecclesiastical province: Oviedo
- Metropolitan: Oviedo

Statistics
- Area: 5,527 km^{2} (2,134 sq mi)
- Population: Total; Catholics: (as of 2010); 592,876; 557,409 (94%)

Information
- Denomination: Roman Catholic
- Sui iuris church: Latin Church
- Rite: Roman Rite
- Established: 12 December 1754
- Cathedral: Cathedral Basilica of the Assumption of the Blessed Virgin in Santander

Current leadership
- Pope: Leo XIV
- Bishop: Arturo Pablo Ros Murgadas
- Metropolitan Archbishop: Jesús Sanz Montes

Map
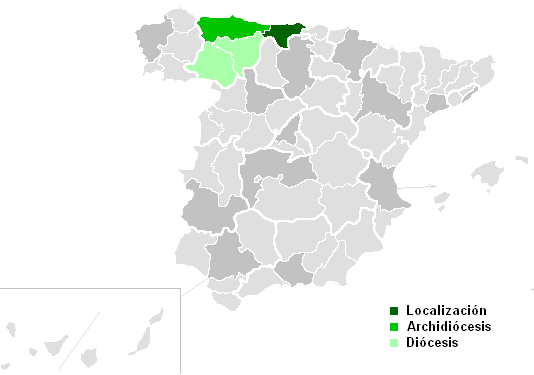

Website
- Website of the Diocese

The Diocese of Santander (Latin: Dioecesis Santanderiensis) is a Latin Church diocese of the Catholic Church seated in Santander Cathedral in the city of Santander in the ecclesiastical province of Oviedo in Spain.

== History ==
- 12 December 1754: Established as Diocese of Santander from the Metropolitan Archdiocese of Burgos

== Leadership ==
- Francisco Javier Arriaza (24 Sep 1755 – 10 Oct 1761)
- Francisco Laso Santos de San Pedro (29 Mar 1762 – 14 May 1783)
- Rafael Tomás Menéndez Luarca y Queipo de Llano (25 Jun 1784 – 20 Jun 1819)
- Juan Nepomuceno Gómez Durán (21 Feb 1820 – 11 Apr 1829)
- Felipe González Abarca, O. de M. (30 Aug 1829 – 12 Mar 1842)
- Manuel Ramón Arias Teijeiro de Castro (17 Jan 1848 – 20 Jul 1859)
- José López Crespo (20 Sep 1859 – 21 Mar 1875)
- Vicente Calvo y Valero (5 Jul 1875 – 27 Mar 1884)
- Vicente Santiago Sánchez de Castro (27 Mar 1884 – 19 Sep 1920)
- Juan Plaza y García (16 Dec 1920 – 10 Jul 1927)
- José María Eguino Trecu (2 Oct 1928 – 7 May 1961)
- Eugenio Beitia Aldazabal (27 Jan 1962 – 23 Jan 1965)
- Vincente Puchol Montis (2 Jul 1965 – 8 May 1967)
- José María Cirarda Lachiondo (22 Jul 1968 – 3 Dec 1971 )
- Juan Antonio del Val Gallo (3 Dec 1971 – 23 Aug 1991)
- José Vilaplana Blasco (23 Aug 1991 – 17 Jul 2006)
- Vicente Jiménez Zamora (27 Jul 2007 – 12 Dec 2014)
- Manuel Sánchez Monge (6 May 2015 - 31 Oct 2023)
- Arturo Pablo Ros Murgadas (16 Dec 2023 - present)

== See also ==
- Roman Catholicism in Spain

== Sources ==
- Catholic Hierarchy
- Diocese website
