= Santander Cathedral =

Santander Cathedral Basilica
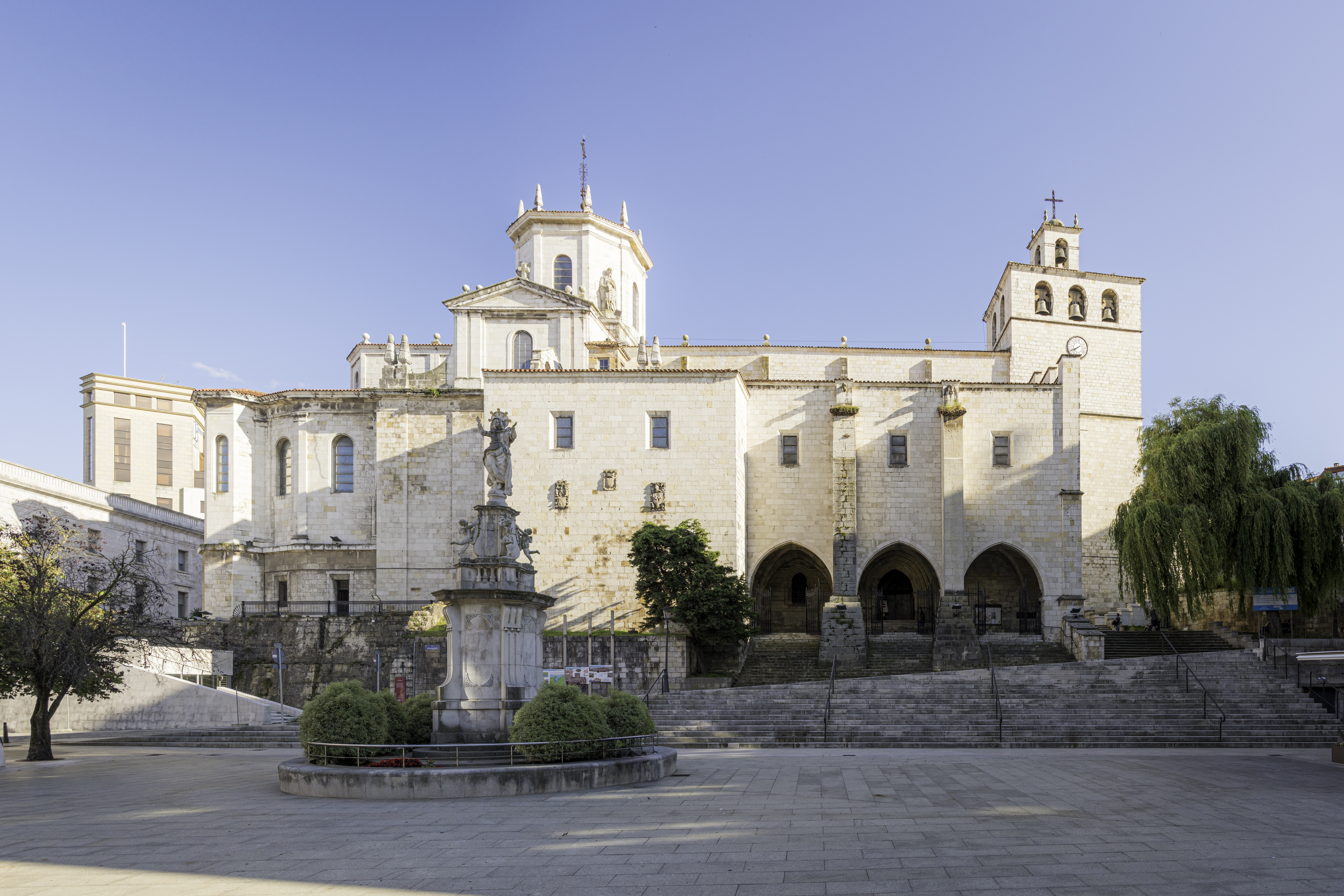
- Northern façade.
- Santander Cathedral Basilica
- 43°27′38″N 3°48′27″W
- Location: Spain Santander (Cantabria), Spain
- Country: Spain
- Denomination: Roman Catholic
- Website: Website of the Diocese of Santander

History
- Former name(s): Santander Abbey; Colegiata de los Cuerpos Santos
- Dedication: Assumption of the Virgin Mary

Architecture
- Style: Gothic

Administration
- Diocese: Santander

Santander Cathedral (Spanish: Catedral de Nuestra Señora de la Asunción de Santander, or "Cathedral Basilica of the Assumption of the Virgin Mary of Santander") is located in the Spanish city of Santander. Its structure is mainly Gothic, although it has been extended and renovated in later times.

== History ==
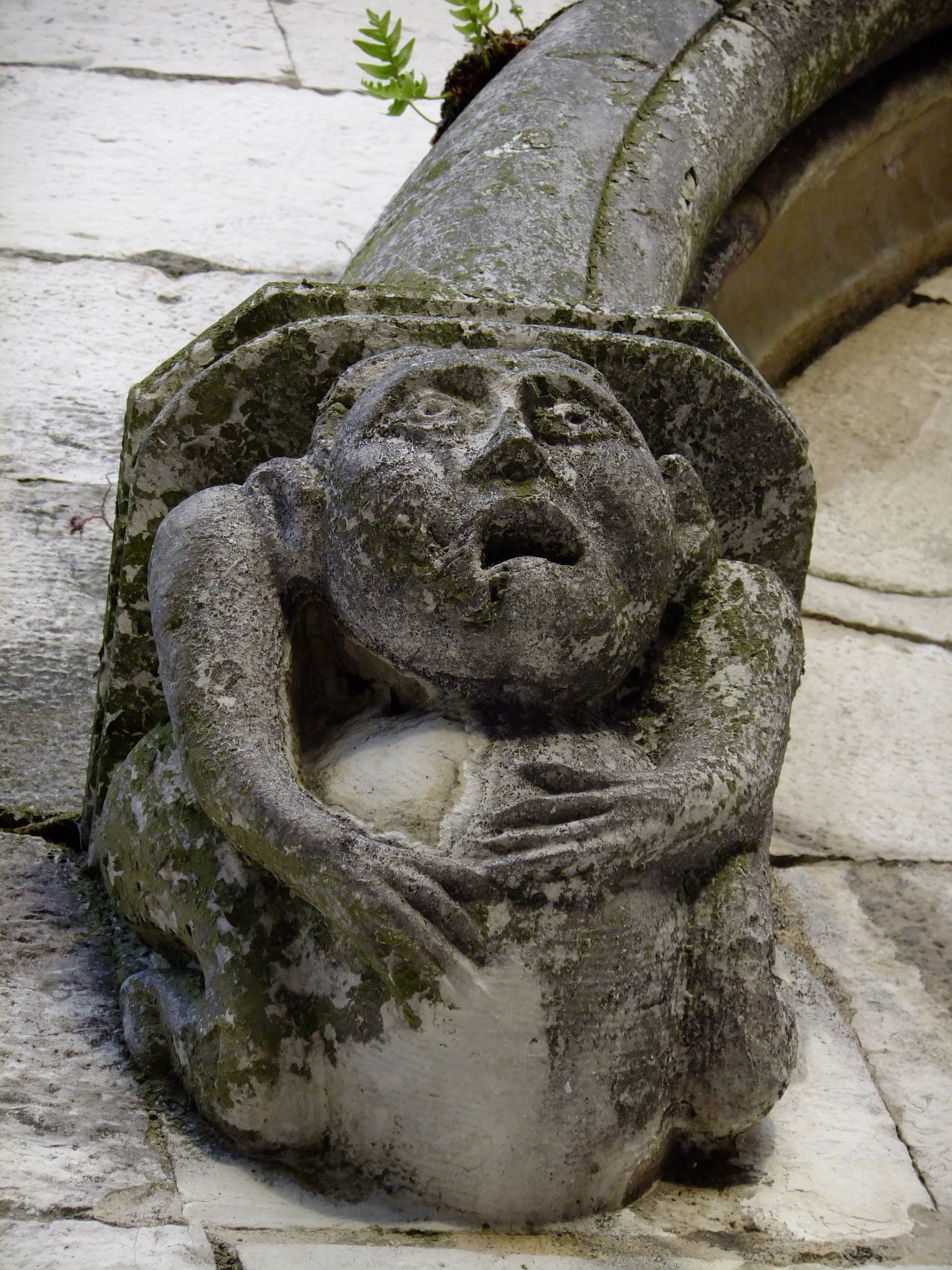
Outside statues in the Cathedral of Santander

The cathedral is a historical monumental complex built between the end of the 12th century and the 14th century on top of the former Santander Abbey also known as the "Abbey of the Holy Bodies" (Abadía de los Cuerpos Santos), an old monastery dedicated to Saints Emeterius and Celedonius.

The church was built from the 8th century on the hill known as Cerro de Somorrostro, surrounded by water, where the Roman settlement of Portus Victoriae Iuliobrigensium had previously been located, in order to keep safe the relics of the saints martyred in Calahorra five centuries before, when their skulls were brought to Santander by those escaping the Muslim invasion of the Iberian Peninsula.

The construction of the lower level dates from the 12th century, shortly after the city was granted its fueros. Initially the abbey church, it was made a collegiate church under the title of the Colegiata de los Cuerpos Santos ("collegiate church of the Holy Bodies") in 1131 by King Alfonso VII, the Emperor. Its reconstruction in its current form was started by Alfonso VIII, after the fuero of Santander was granted in 1187.

The upper level of the church was built between the end of the 12th century and the start of the 14th. Finally, the Gothic cloister was built.

The main portal, constructed around 1230, is of special interest, as it contains the first known carved coat of arms showing lions and castles together, after the final unification of Castile and León in the time of Fernando III, whose son, Sancho, was abbot here.

The church was expanded in the 16th and 17th centuries, incorporating new chapels.

In 1754 the diocese of Santander was created, and the collegiate church was transformed into a cathedral by Pope Benedict XIV, as the seat of the new bishop of Santander.

It suffered considerable damage as a result of the enormous dynamite explosion on the steamship Cabo Machichaco in the harbour in 1893. After surviving the Spanish Civil War, it suffered serious damage in the Santander Fire of 1941, and needed extensive reconstruction and repair from 1942 to 1953, when it was reopened. The architects in charge of this task were José Manuel Bringas and Juan José Resines del Castillo.

The respectful restoration performed on the affected parts today permits the appreciation of the architectural qualities of the original monument.

The church is also a basilica of immemorial memory.

== Building ==
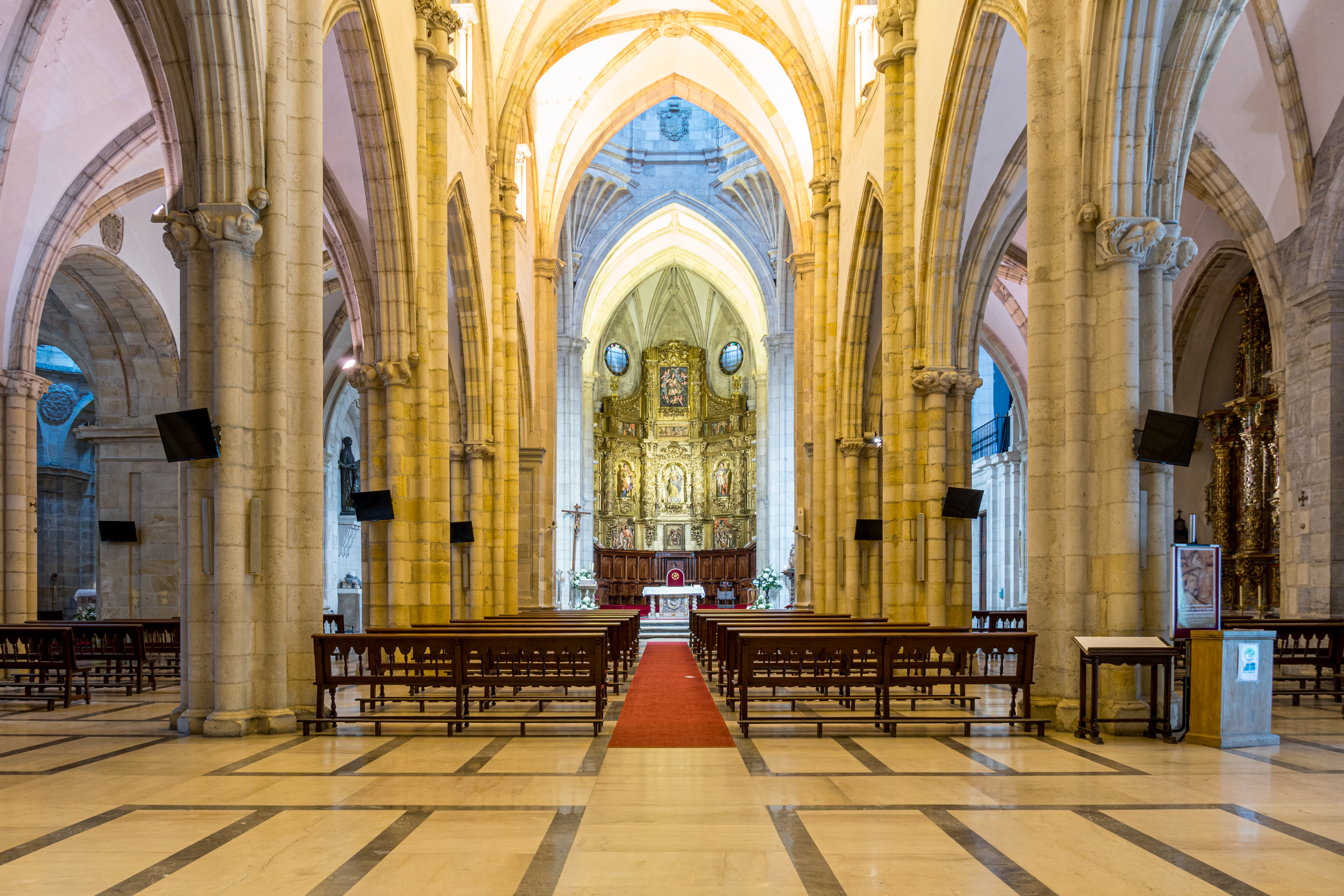
Main nave.

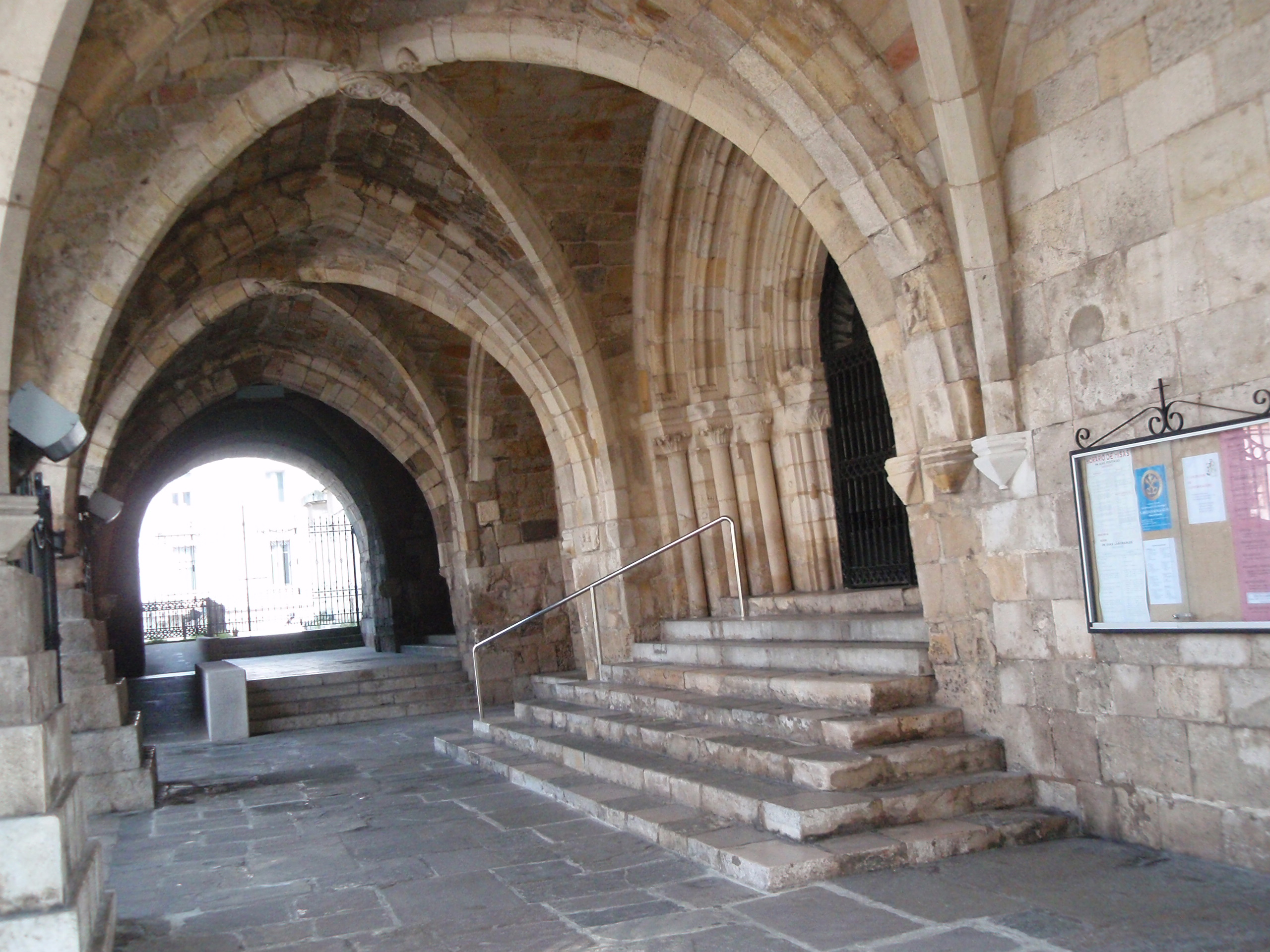
Access to the Lower Church of the Cathedral of Santander.

The church comprises two overlapping floors and a cloister with annexed rooms.

=== Church of the Christ ===
The lower and older church, now the crypt, often referred to as the Iglesia del Cristo, or "Church of the Christ", contains a nave and two aisles. Its dimensions are 31 metres long and 18 metres wide. The whole vaulted structure supports the weight of the upper floor, which explains the thickness and robustness of the construction. Its decoration consists mainly of plant-like ornaments.

=== Cathedral-Basilica of Santander ===
The principal church of this monumental complex was built during the 13th century in the same simple Gothic style that had been used for the preceding Church of the Christ. It lost most of its treasures in the above-mentioned fire of 1941, although some survived and others were later recovered. Most of the decoration of the arches, columns, entablature and doorways is preserved. The portal with the coat of arms of Castile and León is specially important. The windows are decorated with stained glass, although it is modern.

The cathedral has numerous chapels distributed along the walls of the two side aisles to the north and south. To the south, the first chapel is the work of Fernando Herrera Calderón dating from 1624; the second one was made by Juan Alvarado in the 17th century; the third one is by Sebastián de la Puebla, and dates from 1622. To the north, the first chapel is from 1671, and has Baroque characteristics; the second one is the Penitence Chapel and contains a baptismal font; and the third one holds the tomb of Marcelino Menéndez Pelayo sculpted by Victorio Macho.

Due to the reconstruction project, many important Baroque elements were suppressed that had formed an extension to the church and were the work of José de Cereceda dating from the 18th century.

The church was expanded in the middle of the 20th century by the addition of a new presbytery and ambulatory. In order to build these new elements, the stone choir that had survived the fire, the Martyrs' Door and the monumental stairs had to be removed. The choir had been constructed by Francisco del Pontón Setien and Juan de la Sierra Bocerraiz, and the other items were the work of Gregorio de la Roza dating from the 17th century. These last were disassembled and their building stones numbered for later reconstruction, but their location ever since has been unknown.

The presbytery is surrounded by the ambulatory, which contains two altars devoted to Saint Fernando III of Castile and to Saint Matthias. It is also accompanied by a piece of marble with carvings in Arabic, supposedly taken in the assault on Seville. In the southern flank there is a tribune decorated by José Cataluña. The vaults are simple groin vaults, whose slenderness is magnified by the light coming from the clerestory in the wider and higher central nave.

The old collegiate church consisted of three naves, with a fourth one being added from the space formerly occupied by the abbot's palace and other chapels. Between the 15th and 17th centuries several side chapels were added to it.

The cloister, with a trapezoidal shape, was built during the first half of the 14th century in the same architectural style. Through the doors of its western wall, it was possible to access the great Hospital of the Holy Ghost and the pilgrims' church on the Way of St. James.

== Sources ==
- Casada Soto, José Luis (ed.), nd: La Catedral de Santander. Fundación Marcelino Botín
