= José María Cirarda Lachiondo =

Spanish Bishop

- Archbishop of Archdiocese of Pamplona y Tudela (Emeritus)
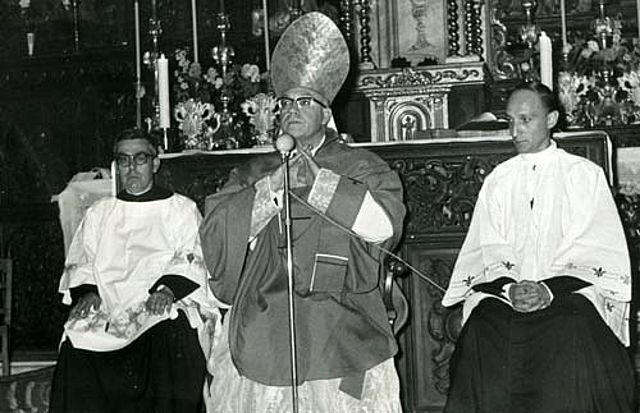
- Church: Roman Catholic Church
- See: Archdiocese of Pamplona y Tudela
- In office: 1978–1993
- Predecessor: José Méndez Asensio
- Successor: Fernando Sebastián Aguilar
- Previous post(s): Bishop

Orders
- Ordination: 5 July 1942

Personal details
- Born: 23 May 1917; Baquio, Spain
- Died: 17 September 2008 (aged 91); Vitória, Spain

José María Cirarda Lachiondo (23 May 1917 – 17 September 2008) was a Spanish Bishop of the Roman Catholic Church.

Lachiondo was born in Baquio, Spain and was ordained a priest on 5 July 1942. Lachiondo was appointed auxiliary bishop of the Archdiocese of Seville as well as Titular Bishop of Drusiliana on 9 April 1960 and ordained a bishop on 29 June 1960. He was appointed bishop of the Diocese of Santander on 22 July 1968 and then the Diocese of Córdoba in Spain on 3 December 1971. On 31 December 1978 Lachiondo was appointed to the Archdiocese of Pamplona y Tudela and would remain at diocese until retirement on 26 March 1993.

== See also ==
- Archdiocese of Pamplona y Tudela
- Archdiocese of Seville
- Diocese of Santander
- Diocese of Córdoba
