= 1941 Santander fire =

Natural disaster in Santander, Kingdom of Spain

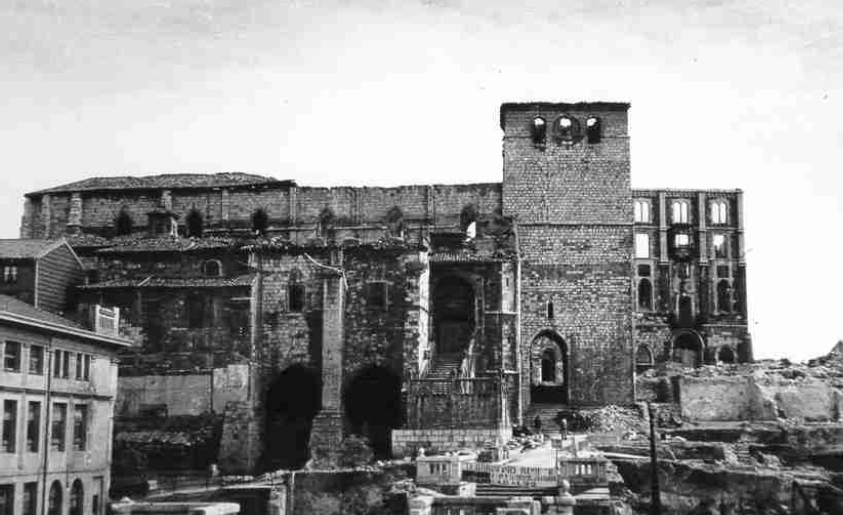
- Date: From 15 February to 16 February 1941. Some embers remained burning for 15 days.; It started a little before 9:00 p.m. on 15 February.
- Location: Santander, Spain
- Coordinates: 43.459794°N 3.809361°W

Statistics
- Burned area: 14 ha
- Land use: Mainly residential.

Impacts
- Deaths: 1 firefighter
- Injuries: 115

Ignition
- Cause: Probably a stove or fireplace, although it could also have been a short circuit.

Map
- Location within Cantabria Location within Spain

The Santander fire of 1941 was a natural disaster that occurred in the Spanish city of Santander during the early morning hours of 15 February to 16 February 1941. Occurring decades after the explosion of the steamship Cabo Machichaco (1893), it is considered the most devastating fire in the history of the city.

The fire destroyed a large part of the historic center of the city, including the cathedral, and caused a great change in the urban structure of Santander. Most of the damage was material, as thousands of families lost their homes and businesses. There was one fatality, a firefighter from Madrid, and more than a hundred people were injured. The fire is popularly known as the Andalusian fire because, curiously, it started on Cadiz Street and the flames were stopped at Seville Street.

== Background ==
In 1941 Spain was in a very difficult post-war period, since the three-year civil war that had ended two years earlier was compounded by the fact that World War II was underway, making reconstruction difficult. Due to the extreme poverty of this period, all kinds of accidents occurred due to outdated or poorly maintained equipment which did not meet conservation conditions. Many of these accidents caused enormous material and human losses.

Examples of the accidents that took place during the end of the 1930s and the following decade are the explosion of the ammunition dump in Peñaranda de Bracamonte in 1939, the explosion of the ammunition dump in Pinar de Antequera in 1940, the railway accident in Torre del Bierzo in 1944, the sinking of the submarine C-4 in 1946, the explosion of the ammunition dumps in Alcalá de Henares in 1947, and the explosion of a Navy ammunition dump in Cádiz in 1947. In all these cases the Francoist censorship reacted forcefully, minimizing as much as possible the accidents or insinuating sabotage conspiracies to harm the Francoist regime.

== Fire ==
The triggering element of the catastrophe was the strong southeasterly wind that, since the afternoon of 15 February, hit the city, accompanied by an atmospheric depression of great intensity. The maximum speed it reached is unknown, since the measuring instruments in Santander were destroyed by the storm. Gusts of over 180 kilometers per hour are estimated. The fire started in Cádiz Street, in the vicinity of the docks, and fanned by a strong south wind, the flames soon reached the cathedral, which, being located in the highest area, became a powerful source of fire spread to the nearby streets.

The origins of the fire are not detailed in the information of the time. It is known with almost total certainty that it started in Cádiz Street, but the triggering object varies according to the source. Some allude to a chimney at number 20 of the same street, others to a short circuit, and some texts locate the origin of the fire at number 5. From there, the fire quickly spread to number 15 Rúa Mayor, fanned by the strong south wind.

From the axis of the Puebla Vieja (cathedral, Rúa Mayor, Rúa Menor...), the fire spread towards the streets of La Ribera, San Francisco, Atarazanas, El Puente, La Blanca and Plaza Vieja. In this way it placed its limits to the north, in the slope of the Atalaya, and the street of San José, by the west the fire was cut before reaching Isabel II and the Limón street, without affecting the headquarters of the city council, by the south it extended until the street Calderón de la Barca, while by the east the fire stopped in the first houses of the expansion. The limits of the fire coincide almost completely with the walled space of the 12th century villa.

During the 16th the fire continued, subsiding in the east but advancing in other areas of the city. That same day, 24 hours after the fire started, firefighters arrived from Bilbao, San Sebastián, Palencia, Burgos, Oviedo, Gijón, Avilés and Madrid. Already on the 17th, the absence of wind favored the extinguishing works. Furniture and homeless passers-by began to disappear from the streets. The firefighters penetrated into the burnt area, and the last outbreaks were drowned, although it would not be completely extinguished until fifteen days later.

During the 18th, Governor Carlos Ruiz García issued an Official Information Bulletin giving instructions to the population and providing information on the magnitude of the disaster. Above all, slogans, orders and specific instructions on supplies and food distribution were disseminated. That same night the cruiser Canarias arrived in port, which would bring supplies and food to the population. The change of the wind to the northwest and the beginning of the rain helped the firefighters' work. The atmosphere in the city was cleared, but the risk of landslides increased considerably. On the 20th the civil governor issued a decree obliging all owners to repair the roofs of buildings and smoke vents within 48 hours. La Covadonga, Trascueto and Agustín García shingle kilns were seized. The first field kitchens arrived and the distribution of hot food to the victims began.

The main outbreaks of the fire were extinguished in the first three days, but most of the ruins and destroyed buildings harbored flames in the following days. After fifteen days from the beginning of the fire, the catastrophe came to an end with the last extinguished focus of the fire, in a house on Cuesta Street.

== Consequences ==
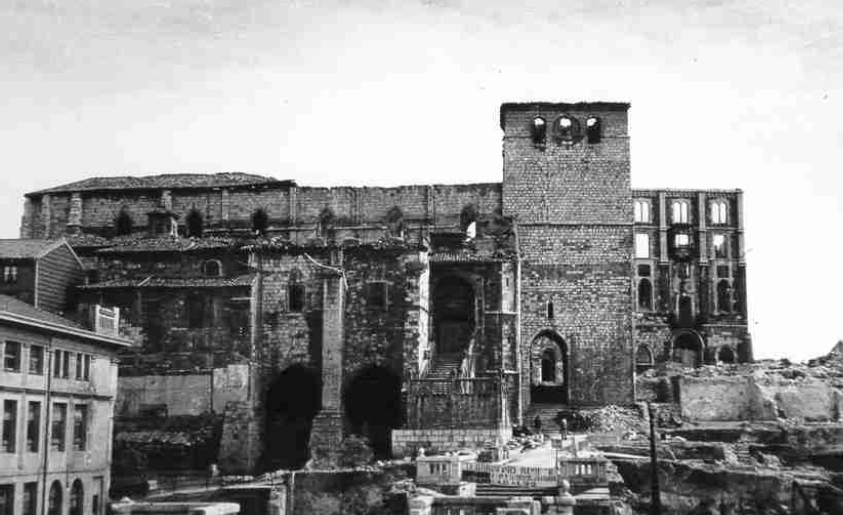
The Santander Cathedral after the fire.

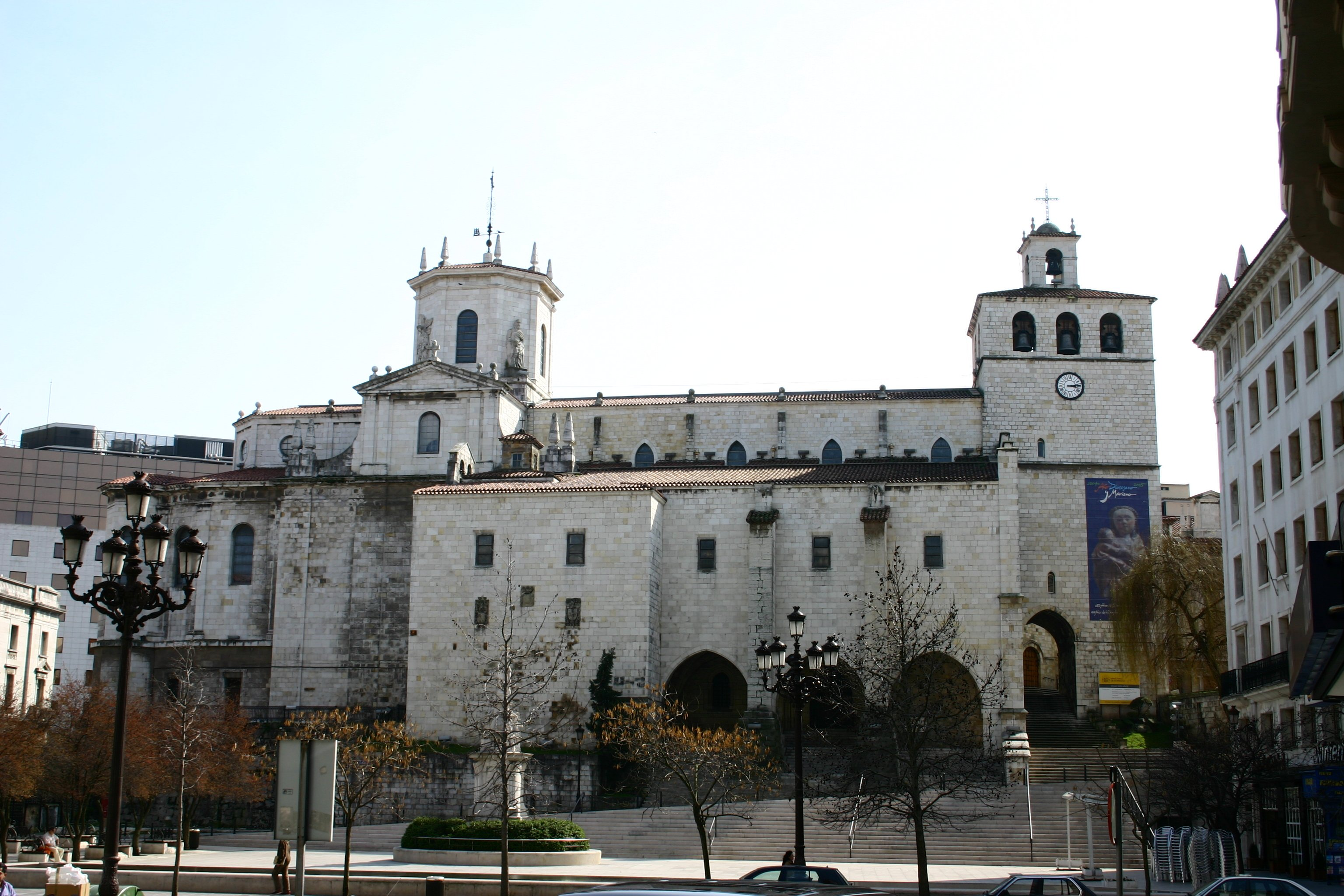
The Santander Cathedral nowadays.

In general, the fire affected the narrow streets (except for Atarazanas), with buildings basically constructed of wood and with bay windows that facilitated the spread of the flames.

The result was the almost complete destruction of the historical area of the city, that is to say, almost the entire old part of the city, affecting, above all, the Vieja and Nueva Puebla and more modern buildings erected in its precincts. The buildings that disappeared were mainly residential buildings, most of which were occupied by the working classes. Most of the medieval town was destroyed, the total were 37 of the oldest streets of the city that occupied 14 hectares, which meant the disappearance of 400 buildings, including homes (approximately 2000) and stores.

The affected area was also characterized by being the center of the city, the axis where most of Santander's commercial establishments were located at that time. It has been calculated that the fire destroyed 90% of the premises used for this activity. It must be taken into account that the streets of La Blanca and San Francisco were the base of the commercial life of the city.

Likewise, some public buildings disappeared or were affected to a greater or lesser degree. This is the case of the cathedral of Nuestra Señora de la Asunción, the old Town Hall, the church of La Compañía and the palace of the Marquis of Villatorre. The headquarters of the regional newspaper El Diario Montañés was destroyed by fire.

There were about 10,000 victims and about 7,000 people in forced unemployment. At the time of the disaster, the post of Special Government Delegate for the Reconstruction of Santander was created, which was in charge of the new area and the urban future of the city. The reconstruction plan included the opening of the new Juan de Herrera Street, a commercial street that links the City Hall with Hernán Cortés, while respecting the church of La Compañía, which was spared from the fire.

The fire caused only one victim, Julián Sánchez García, a firefighter from Madrid who died in Valdecilla hospital after a slight recovery. Nevertheless, the material damage was immense, and thousands of families lost their homes.

=== Damage assessment ===
The material assessment of the losses was officially put at 85,312,506 pesetas. The number of victims amounted to some 10,000 people, which, bearing in mind that the de facto population of the city in 1940 was 101,793 inhabitants (INE), meant that approximately 10% of the inhabitants of Santander were left homeless and a good percentage of them lost their businesses and companies. In 1941, Spain was in the midst of the post-war period and the socioeconomic situation was not very favorable, so a catastrophe of this magnitude increased the bad situation for both the city and the region.

=== Urban planning ===
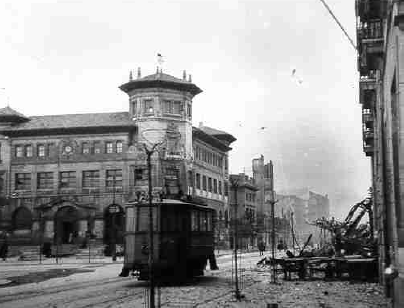
The Post Office was one of the few buildings in the area that was spared from the catastrophe.

As a result of the fire, 115,421m^{2} of urban land magnificently located in the physical center of the city of Santander were vacated and expropriated to concentrate the plots of land. It was, therefore, an exceptionally favorable occasion to make land available for real estate businesses in an area where the value of the land was and is subject to a growing surplus value, which led to speculation with such land in order to favor the upper classes of the city.

The fire had a significant impact on urban planning and an indisputable impact on the social reorganization of the city of Santander, stimulating new urban processes both in the center and in the peripheral areas to which a large part of the population displaced by the fire went. This is fundamental for understanding the dynamics of Santander's urban space in the stage prior to the great expansion of the 1960s.

The reconstruction, which began quickly, was undertaken on the basis of a series of fundamental principles. First of all, an attempt was made to solve the road problem by building a new route for the tramway that would overcome the dysfunctionalities resulting from the narrow and irregularly distributed streets of the historic center. To this end, a project was accepted that followed the guidelines of the Ensanche model, with an orthogonal grid composed of wide streets in the areas of greatest traffic confluence. In this sense, it is illustrative of the widening of the old Atarazanas street to form the current Calvo Sotelo avenue.

The second fundamental criterion was given by the commercial orientation and wealthy residence that was given priority to this area, especially to the streets of San Francisco, Calvo Sotelo and Juan de Herrera.

Likewise, the need to build a main square as the new representative center of the city was upheld: the Plaza Porticada, home to some official buildings, such as the Civil Government, the Treasury Delegation, the Military Government, the Chamber of Commerce, Industry and Navigation, and currently also includes the headquarters of Caja Cantabria.

Another proposed objective was the revaluation of religious buildings, taking advantage of their limited aesthetic possibilities. For this reason, time was devoted to the reconstruction of the cathedral of Santander, the church of the Annunciation and the construction of the Plaza de la Asunción.

Finally, an important achievement of the 40s was the clearing between the cathedral and the current Ruamayor Street. Parallel to all of the above, two fundamental phenomena occurred: the displacement of the lower class population settled in the old houses of the center to the periphery, which led to the consequent growth of the city on its outskirts.

In Santander, construction activity in the years following the fire increased significantly, below the real needs and following a selective criterion. Thus, the area directly affected by the fire was remodeled through private initiative, which constructed buildings for official, commercial and bourgeois residential use.

Workers' housing was located, at first provisionally in certain cases, in isolated points of the urban center, generally far from the center. In these cases, the management for the construction of housing came from municipal state agencies that built cheap houses of an almost or totally suburban type (200 "casucas" of Canda Landáburu in La Albericia, housing in the neighborhood of Campogiro in Peñacastillo and blocks of housing subsidized by the Obra Sindical del Hogar), generally of low quality, such as the Pero Niño Group (the only neighborhood for the modest classes to be built in the disaster area), and on the outskirts, the Santos Mártires (162 homes), José María de Pereda (111), Pedro Velarde (348) and Barrio Pesquero (294) groups.

In the area affected by the fire, approximately half as many low-income housing units were built as bourgeois residences, a phenomenon that clearly illustrates the new social and functional dimension that was imposed in this central area and, therefore, of great value in the urban area as a whole.

By 1954, this extensive reconstruction work was practically completed, resulting in five new public buildings and 170 private ones. Thus, the fire and the subsequent reconstruction of the center brought with it two key consequences for the current city of Santander. On the one hand, there was a profound morphological and functional transformation of the central urban space that led to a process of urban renewal that preceded that of other Spanish cities. On the other hand, it triggered a non-spontaneous mobilization of population of large proportions that ultimately leaves its traces in the current socio-urban structuring. Even so, it took 25 years to rebuild the city in its entirety.

== The fire in numbers ==
- The fire lasted 2 days, although some embers remained burning for 15 days.
- 377 buildings were destroyed, most of them quite old.
- 1,783 homes were lost.
- 37 streets were affected.
- The area destroyed was 14 hectares.
- Approximately 10,000 people lost their homes.
- 508 businesses were destroyed.
- 105 lodgings were destroyed.
- There was 1 victim, the Madrid firefighter Julián Sánchez.
- 115 people were injured.
- Reconstruction was not completed until 25 years later.

== Commemoration of the 75th anniversary of the fire ==
In 2016, as a commemoration of the 75th anniversary of the fire, a long series of activities organized by the City Council were carried out, ranging from photographic exhibitions, parties and screenings at various points in the city to the creation of a route that runs through the main points of the center affected by the fire.

== Bibliography ==
- Linares Argüelles, Mariano; Pindado Uslé, Jesús; Aedo Pérez, Carlos (1985). Gran enciclopedia de Cantabria (in Spanish). Editorial Cantabria. ISBN 84-86420-00-8 (Complete work), ISBN 84-86420-04-0 (IV Volume)
- Rodríguez Llera, Ramon (1980). La reconstrucción urbana de Santander, Santander (in Spanish).
- Toca, S (1972). "Santander en llamas" (in Spanish). Altamira.
