= Santander, Spain =

Santander
- Municipality
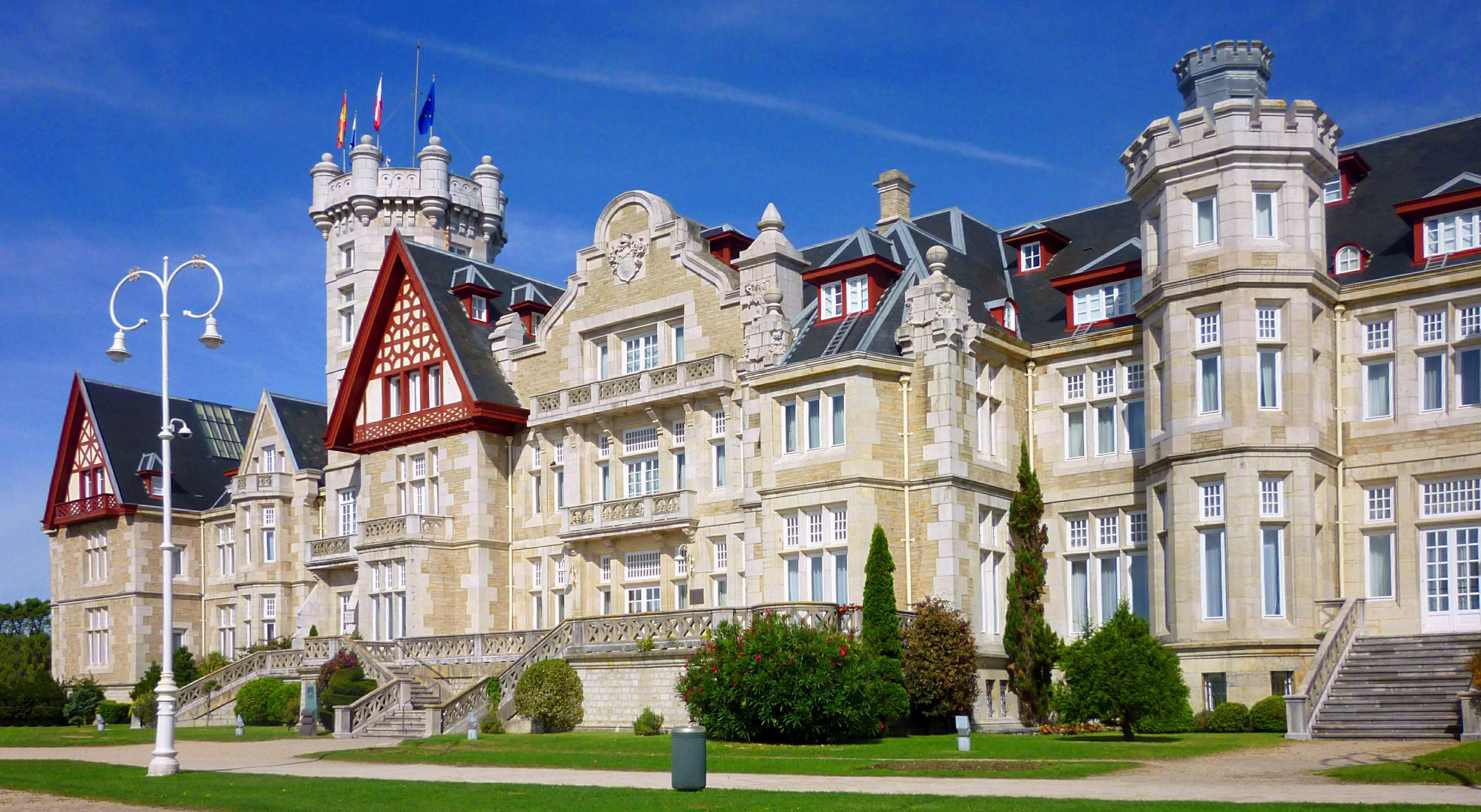
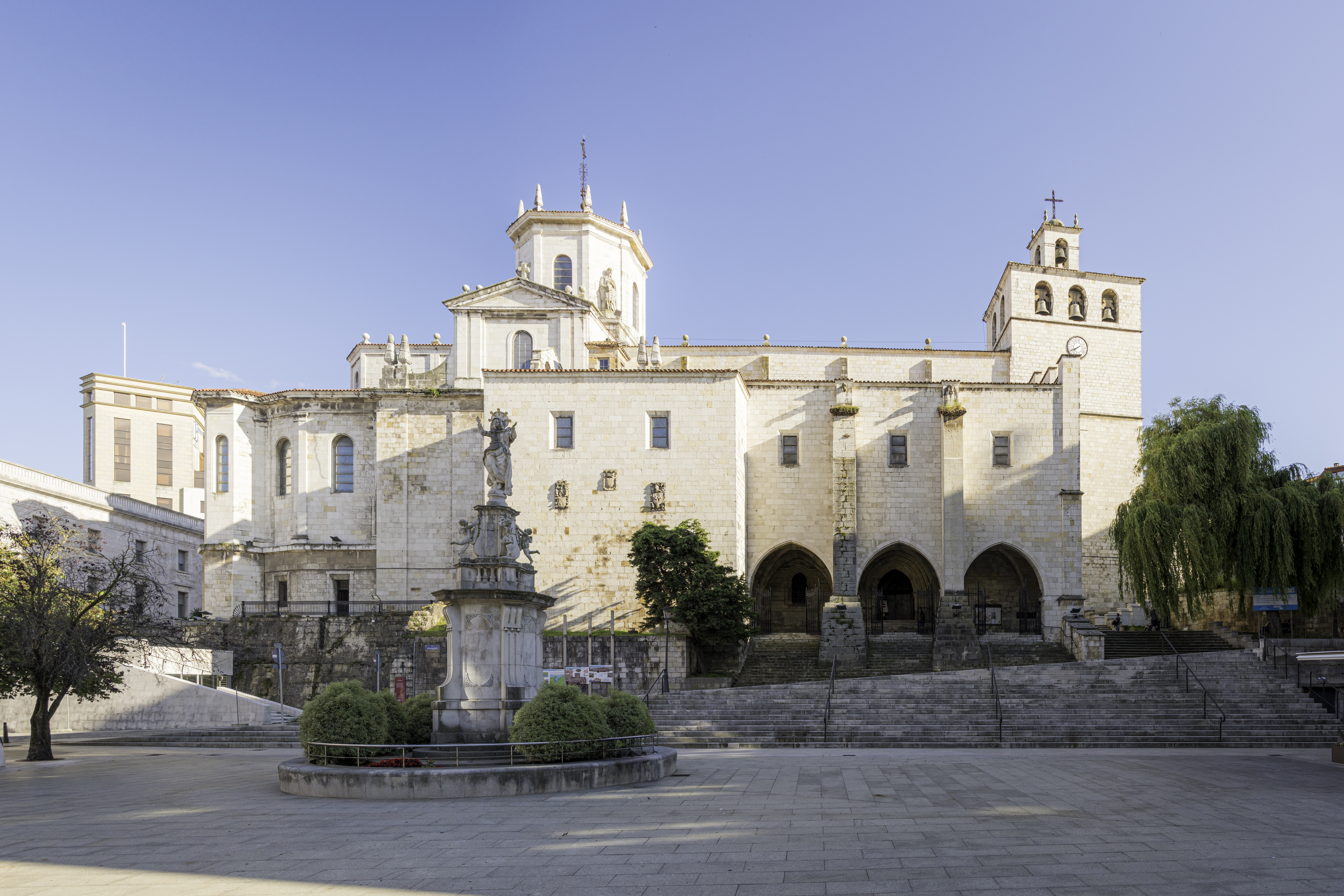
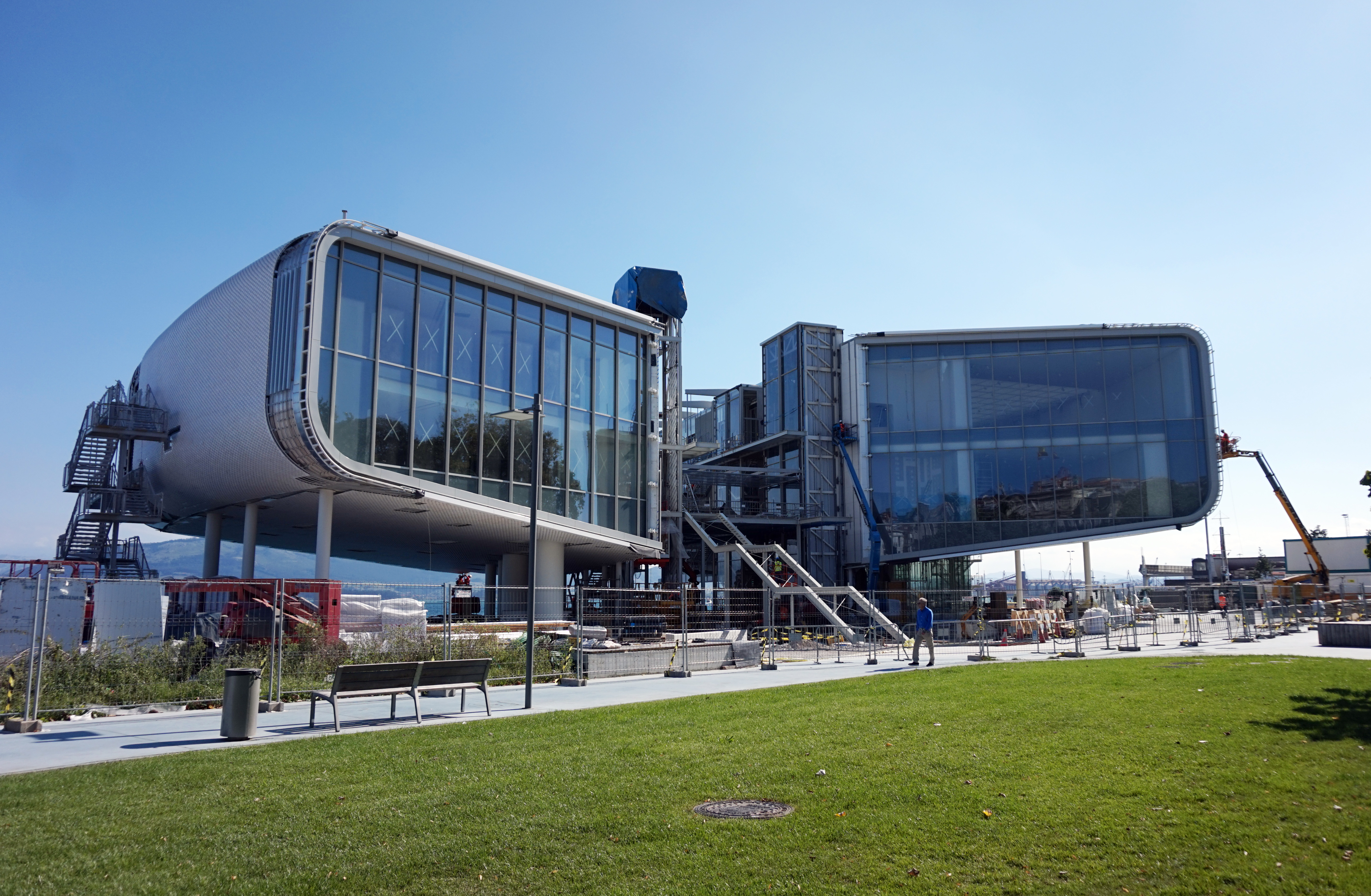
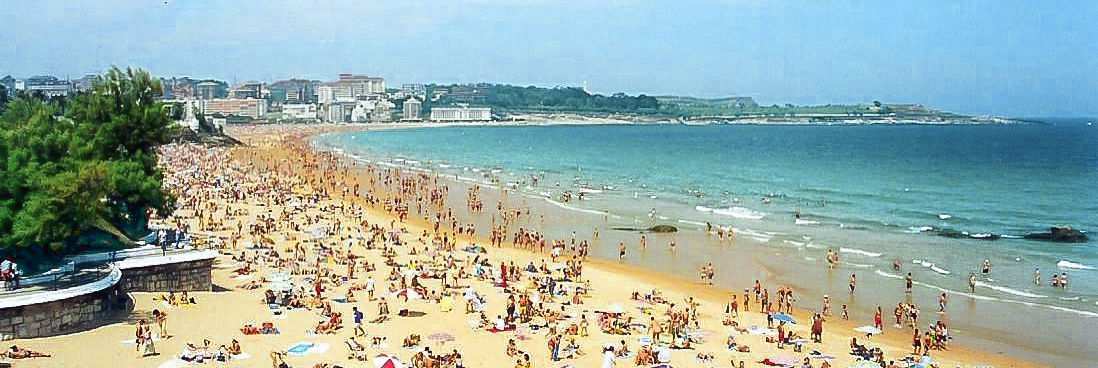
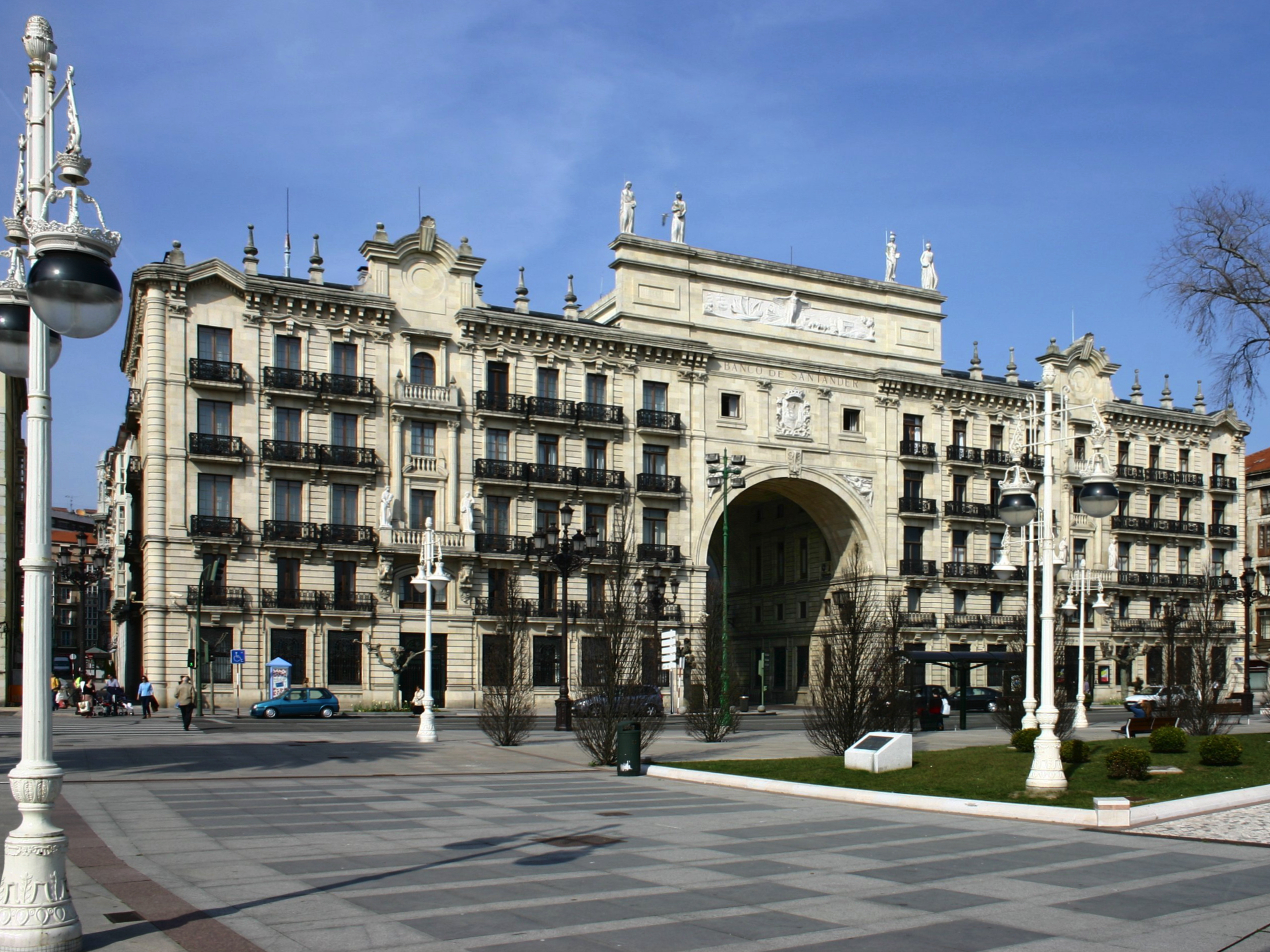
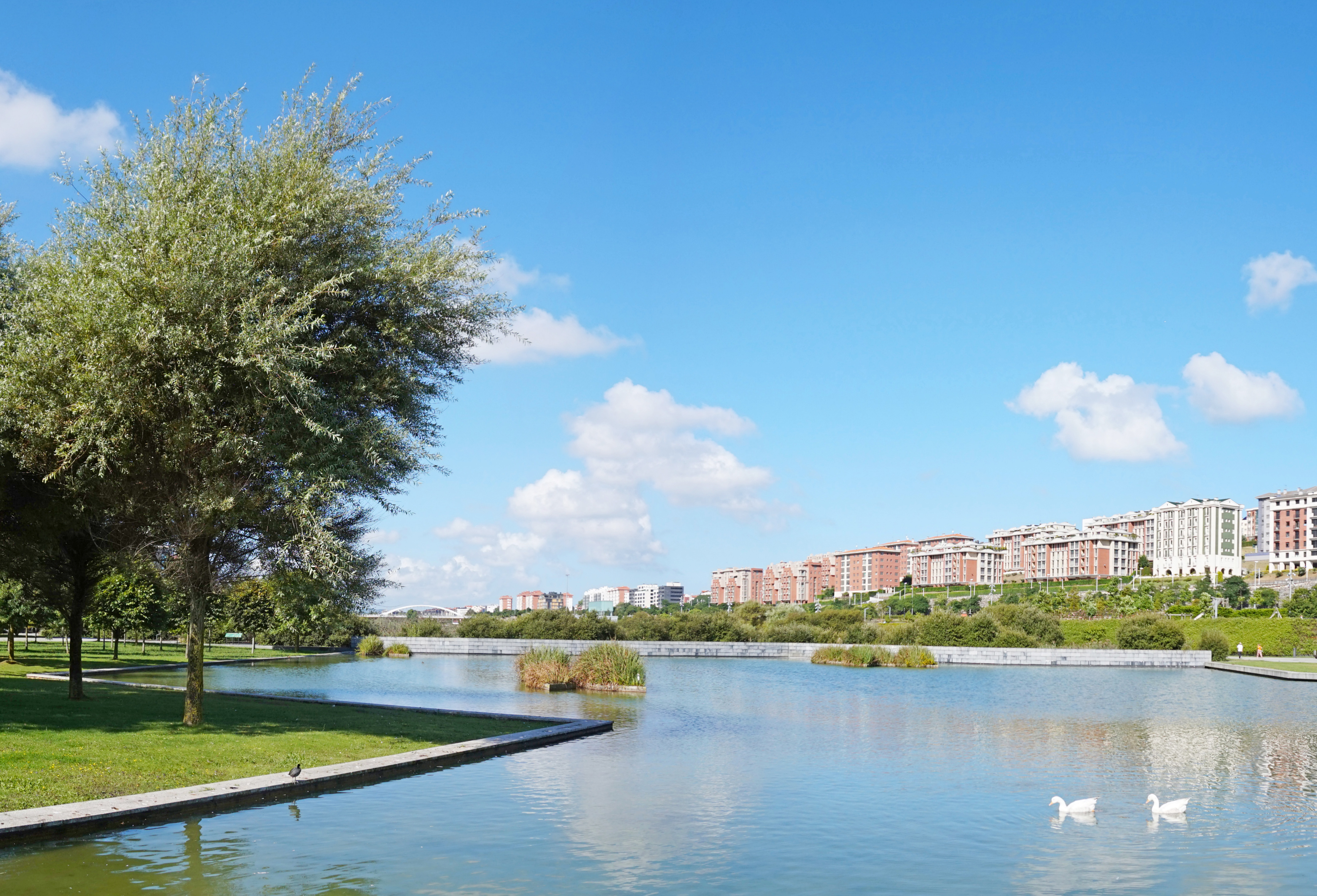
- Palacio de la Magdalena Cathedral Centro Botín Sardinero Beach Banco Santander building Las Llamas park

- Flag Coat of arms
- Location of Santander
- Coordinates: 43°27′46″N 3°48′18″W
- Country: Spain
- Autonomous community: Cantabria
- Founded: 26 BC, as Portus Victoriae Iuliobrigensium; 9 January 1755, granting the title of city

Government
  - Mayor: Gema Igual (2016) (PP)

Area
  - Municipality: 36 km^{2} (14 sq mi)
- Elevation: 15 m (49 ft)
- Highest elevation: 108 m (354 ft)
- Lowest elevation: 0 m (0 ft)

Population (2025)
  - Municipality: 175,082
  - Density: 4,900/km^{2} (13,000/sq mi)
  - Urban: 259,539
  - Metro: 403,000
  - Seat/Locality: 127,392
- Demonym: Santanderine

GDP
  - Metro: €12.839 billion (2020)
- Time zone: UTC+1 (CET)
  - Summer (DST): UTC+2 (CEST)
- Postal code: 39001-39012
- Official language(s): Spanish
- Website: Official website

Santander (UK: /ˌsæntənˈdɛər, -tæn-/ SAN-tən-DAIR, -tan-, US: /ˌsɑːntɑːnˈdɛər/ SAHN-tahn-DAIR; Spanish: [santanˈdeɾ]) is the capital of the autonomous community of Cantabria, Spain. It has a population of 172,000 (2017). It is a port city located in the northern coast of the Iberian Peninsula, facing the Cantabrian Sea.

It is believed to have been a port since ancient times, due to its favourable location, and is documented as far back as the 11th century. Much of the old city was lost in the Great Fire of 1941. The city was then rebuilt realizing Francoist ideals of social segregation. Today, its remaining old town, beach and other attractions are popular with tourists and other visitors and its economy is mainly service based. The port is still very active and a regular ferry service operates to the United Kingdom. Fish and seafood dominate the local cuisine. Santander notably houses the headquarters of multinational bank Banco Santander, which was founded there. The city has a mild climate typical of the Spanish northern coastline with frequent rainfall and stable temperatures. Cold snaps and heat waves are very rare.

== History ==
=== Origins, Roman period and Middle Ages ===
The origin of the earliest human settlements in the current Santander is not easy to establish because there is little written and little archaeological data. However, there would appear to be good practical reasons for ancient settlers to have chosen the north side of the bay, sheltered from it and safer from the storms of the Bay of Biscay, on the north side of the promontory of Somorrostro and along the ancient Becedo estuary. Moreover, the hillside provided good visibility for spotting potential attackers, making this the ideal place for the foundation of a stable settlement, which was to evolve throughout the Middle Ages.

Although it is mentioned for the first time in 1068, in a draft document made by King Sancho II, in the 9th century Alfonso II the Chaste founded the Abadía de los Cuerpos Santos ("Abbey of the Holy Bodies") in the existing chapel on the hill of Somorrostro, housing as holy relics the heads of Saint Emeterius and Saint Celedonius and the graves of other unknown martyrs, giving the abbey its name.

Alfonso VIII of Castile granted the city a fuero (charter) in 1187.

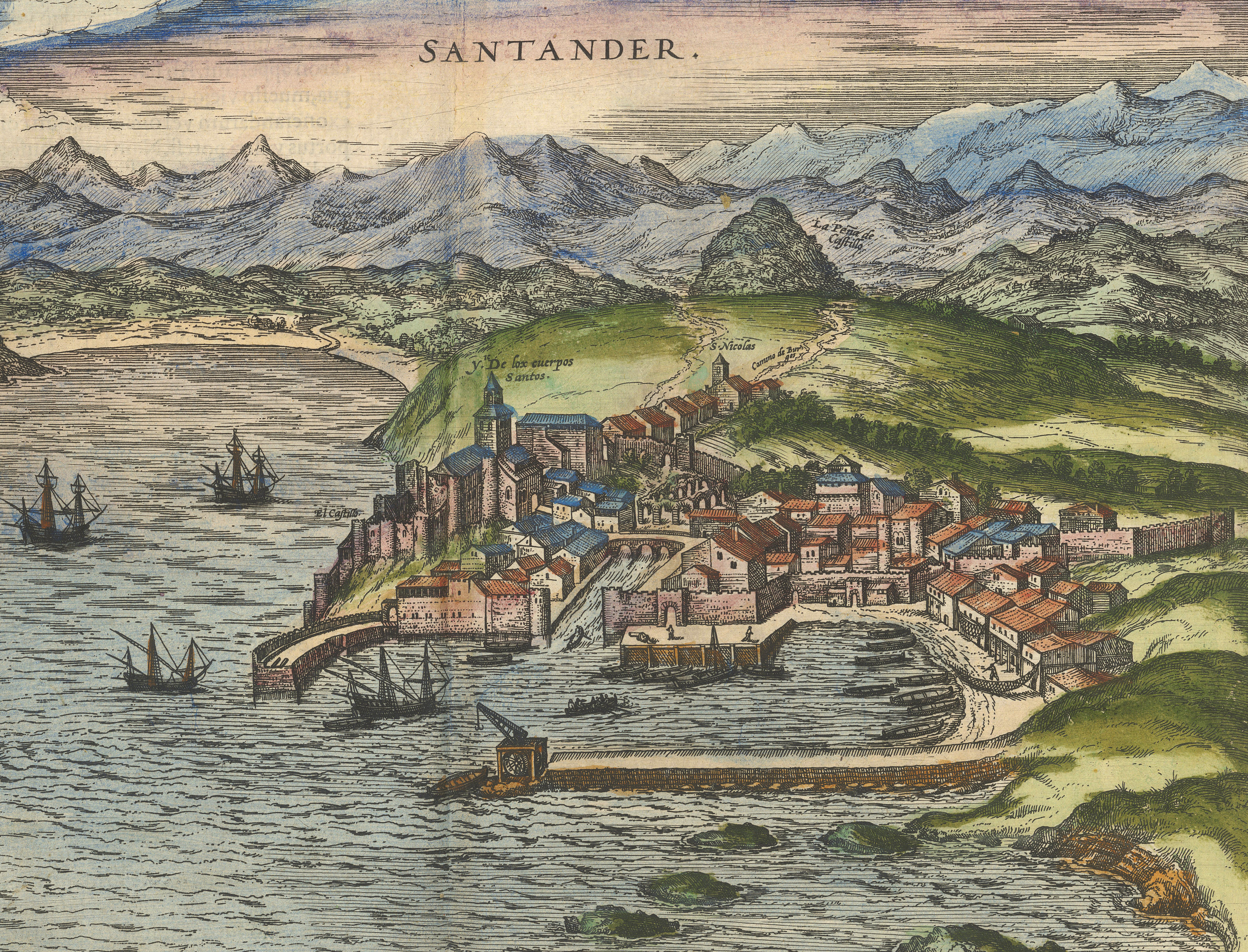
Santander, c. 1590 – by Joris Hoefnagel

During the 12th and 13th centuries the population was contained within the walls of two different pueblas. La Puebla, the older, on the hill overlooking the city facing the bay, included the old castle, the Abbey of the Holy Bodies and the cloister. It had three rows of houses, separated by Rua Carnicerias and Rua Mayor, where the homes of prominent people of the town were, as well as those of the Abbot's canons. Meanwhile, the Puebla Nueva contained the convent of Santa Clara and San Francisco, which gave its name to one of the main streets; other important streets were the Rua de la Sal, The cavalcade Palace, Ribera, Don Gutierre, Puerta de la Sierra, Gallows and the Arcillero Rua. The two pueblas were joined by a bridge over the river that divided Becedo and flowed down to the shipyards, which were ordered by the king to take timber from the Cantabrian forests for shipbuilding. The villa was required to give the monarchy a ship per year.

By the end of the 15th century Santander had a population of about 4,000 or 5,000 inhabitants.

The city owes its existence to the excellent harbour of the Bay of Santander. Santander was an important port for Castile in the later Middle Ages, and also for trade with the New World. It officially became a city in 1755.

=== Cabo Machichaco explosions ===
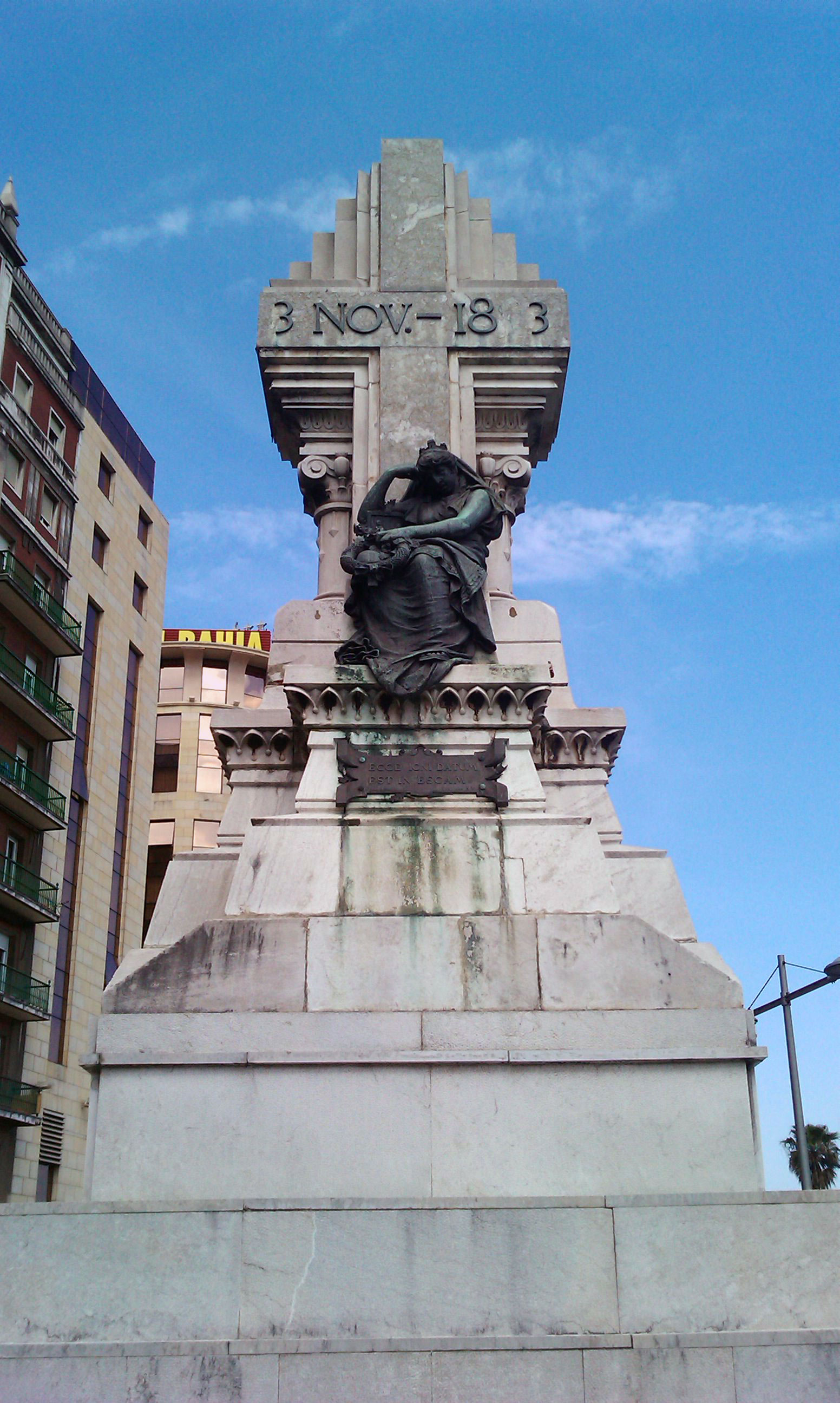
Monument in Plaza Machichaco to the victims of the two Cabo Machichaco explosions in 1893 and 1894

On 3 November 1893 a steamship, Cabo Machichaco, caught fire while she was being unloaded at a pier in the heart of the city. A crowd of 2,000 to 3,000 people watched as crew and firefighters fought the fire. About 40 tonnes of dynamite being carried in her forward holds exploded, killing about 590 people, injuring about 2,000, sinking the ship and destroying at least 65 buildings near the harbour.

On 21 March 1894 a salvage diver working to salvage cargo from Cabo Machichaco's wreck accidentally detonated about 11 tonnes of dynamite that were submerged in the aft hold of the ship. 18 people were killed and 11 injured.

=== Spanish Civil War ===
The initial uprising in Santander in 1936 by Nationalist forces was defeated, leaving the city in the hands of the Republican government. The coast of Santander was patrolled by Nationalist ships and the city was put under blockade. The Battle of Santander saw the city captured by Nationalist forces on 26 August 1937. There was a spate of executions of captured Republicans following the battle, with Adam Hoschild accounting for at least 1267 people executed following quick trials, 739 people executed without trial, and 389 dying of maltreatment in captivity in the weeks after the battle.

=== Great Fire of 1941 ===
Santander fell victim to a great fire in 1941. Fanned by a strong south wind, the fire burned for two days. The fire started in Cádiz Street, next to the harbour, the Cathedral and the medieval quarter. The fire destroyed the Old Town Hall, Jesús de Monasterio and Vargas streets and Atarazanas square buildings. It led to a major change in the architecture of Santander, away from the older small stone and wood buildings with balconies to the enormous blocks of flats built during the reconstruction.

There was only one casualty of the fire, a firefighter from Madrid killed in the line of duty, but thousands of families were left homeless and the city was plunged into chaos. The fire destroyed the greater part of the medieval town centre and gutted the city's Romanesque cathedral.

== Geography ==
The city is located on the northern side of the Bay of Santander.

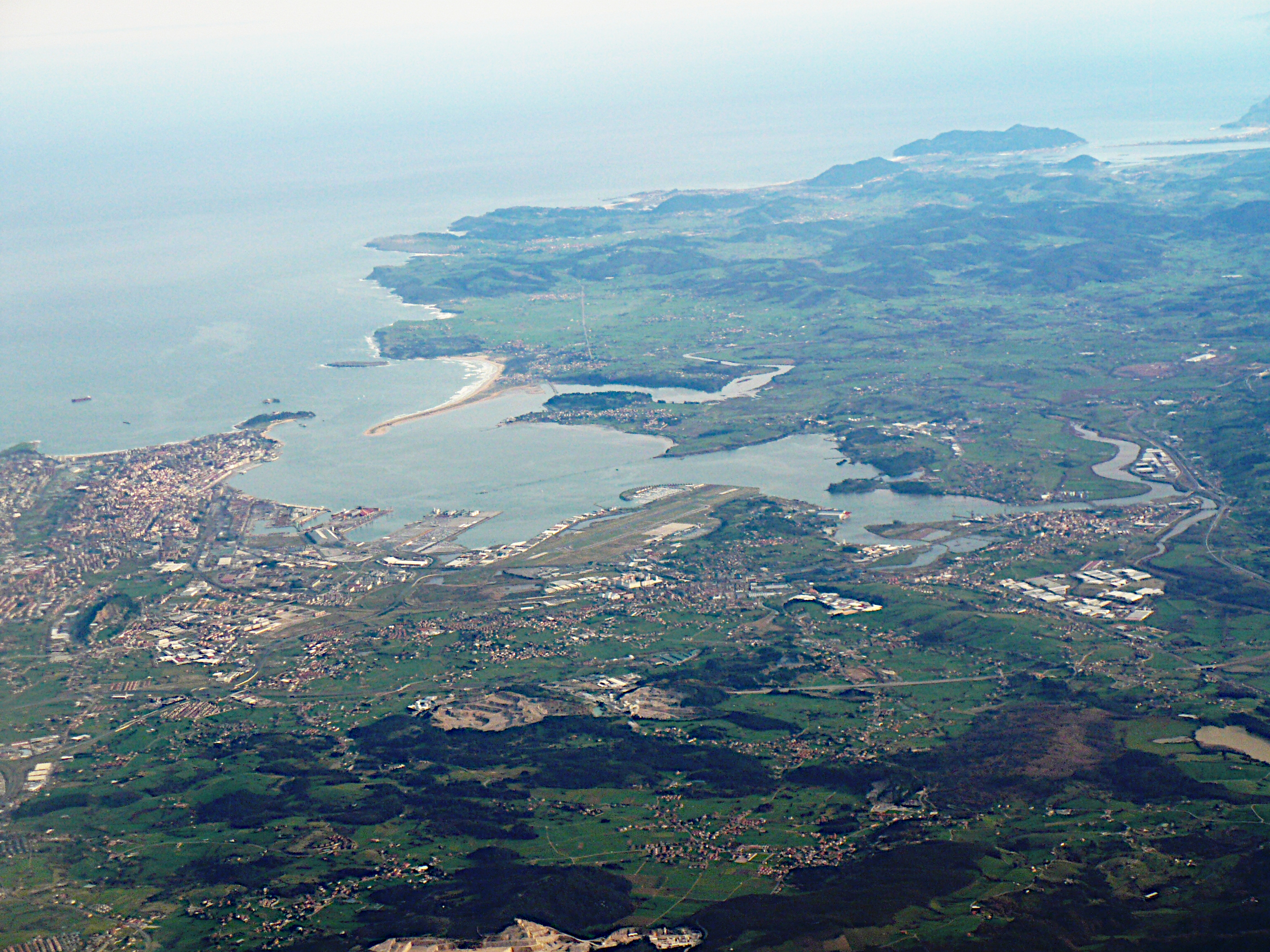
Bird's eye view of the Bay

=== Climate ===
Depending on the system used, the city of Santander has an oceanic (Köppen: Cfb) or humid subtropical (Trewartha: Cf) climate.

The maximum temperature reached in Santander Airport was 37.8 °C (100 °F) on 27 June 2009, and the minimum temperature −5.4 °C (22 °F) on 21 January 1957. The highest maximum daytime average for a month was in August 2003, with 27.1 °C (80.8 °F). Warm months (mean above 22 °C (72 °F)) are however rare. The highest temperature recorded in downtown is 40.2 °C (104.4 °F) in August 1940.

Sunshine hours are very low by comparison with the rest of mainland and southern Spain. Even compared with other areas of northern Spain, such as Galicia, which have many more hours of sunshine in coastal cities such as Vigo or Pontevedra. With annual averages of approximately 1650 hours of sunshine, Santander's southern areas are about as sunny as London and Paris, and quite a bit less sunny than most of England's south coastal regions. The area closer to the coast has higher sunshine time but lower summer afternoon temperatures.

Climate data for Santander, downtown, 64 m (1991–2020), extremes since 1877
Month	Jan	Feb	Mar	Apr	May	Jun	Jul	Aug	Sep	Oct	Nov	Dec	Year
Record high °C (°F)	23.2 (73.8)	26.6 (79.9)	30.0 (86.0)	33.4 (92.1)	35.8 (96.4)	37.4 (99.3)	36.2 (97.2)	40.2 (104.4)	36.8 (98.2)	32.4 (90.3)	26.7 (80.1)	23.8 (74.8)	40.2 (104.4)
Mean daily maximum °C (°F)	13.2 (55.8)	13.3 (55.9)	14.9 (58.8)	15.8 (60.4)	17.9 (64.2)	20.3 (68.5)	22.4 (72.3)	23.3 (73.9)	21.8 (71.2)	19.8 (67.6)	16.0 (60.8)	13.8 (56.8)	17.7 (63.9)
Daily mean °C (°F)	10.7 (51.3)	10.5 (50.9)	11.9 (53.4)	12.9 (55.2)	15.1 (59.2)	17.7 (63.9)	19.8 (67.6)	20.6 (69.1)	18.9 (66.0)	16.8 (62.2)	13.4 (56.1)	11.3 (52.3)	15.0 (59.0)
Mean daily minimum °C (°F)	8.1 (46.6)	7.7 (45.9)	9.0 (48.2)	9.9 (49.8)	12.3 (54.1)	15.0 (59.0)	17.1 (62.8)	17.8 (64.0)	16.0 (60.8)	13.8 (56.8)	10.7 (51.3)	8.8 (47.8)	12.2 (54.0)
Record low °C (°F)	−2.6 (27.3)	−3.8 (25.2)	−0.3 (31.5)	1.6 (34.9)	3.6 (38.5)	7.5 (45.5)	5.2 (41.4)	11.4 (52.5)	7.7 (45.9)	4.4 (39.9)	1.5 (34.7)	−2.8 (27.0)	−3.8 (25.2)
Average precipitation mm (inches)	108.2 (4.26)	74.3 (2.93)	76.3 (3.00)	86.4 (3.40)	71.1 (2.80)	61.9 (2.44)	48.8 (1.92)	60.0 (2.36)	89.2 (3.51)	115.1 (4.53)	152.5 (6.00)	130.3 (5.13)	1,074.1 (42.28)
Average precipitation days (≥ 1 mm)	12.8	10.1	9.7	11.6	10.4	8.7	8.3	8.5	9.3	11.2	14.7	13.1	128.4
Mean monthly sunshine hours	91	121	164	174	209	212	224	202	176	148	93	86	1,900
Source 1: Météo Climat
Source 2: Météo Climat (extremes)

Climate data for Santander Airport (1981–2010) Record Temperatures (1954–2016)
Month	Jan	Feb	Mar	Apr	May	Jun	Jul	Aug	Sep	Oct	Nov	Dec	Year
Record high °C (°F)	25.1 (77.2)	29.0 (84.2)	31.3 (88.3)	30.6 (87.1)	36.8 (98.2)	37.8 (100.0)	37.2 (99.0)	37.3 (99.1)	37.6 (99.7)	33.5 (92.3)	28.0 (82.4)	25.4 (77.7)	37.8 (100.0)
Mean daily maximum °C (°F)	13.6 (56.5)	13.8 (56.8)	15.7 (60.3)	16.6 (61.9)	19.1 (66.4)	21.6 (70.9)	23.6 (74.5)	24.2 (75.6)	22.8 (73.0)	20.3 (68.5)	16.3 (61.3)	14.2 (57.6)	18.5 (65.3)
Daily mean °C (°F)	9.7 (49.5)	9.8 (49.6)	11.3 (52.3)	12.4 (54.3)	15.1 (59.2)	17.8 (64.0)	19.8 (67.6)	20.3 (68.5)	18.6 (65.5)	16.1 (61.0)	12.5 (54.5)	10.5 (50.9)	14.5 (58.1)
Mean daily minimum °C (°F)	5.8 (42.4)	5.7 (42.3)	7.0 (44.6)	8.3 (46.9)	11.1 (52.0)	13.9 (57.0)	16.0 (60.8)	16.4 (61.5)	14.4 (57.9)	11.8 (53.2)	8.7 (47.7)	6.7 (44.1)	10.5 (50.9)
Record low °C (°F)	−5.4 (22.3)	−5.2 (22.6)	−3.0 (26.6)	0.6 (33.1)	2.6 (36.7)	5.6 (42.1)	6.0 (42.8)	6.0 (42.8)	2.8 (37.0)	1.4 (34.5)	−3.5 (25.7)	−5.2 (22.6)	−5.4 (22.3)
Average precipitation mm (inches)	106 (4.2)	92 (3.6)	88 (3.5)	102 (4.0)	78 (3.1)	58 (2.3)	52 (2.0)	73 (2.9)	83 (3.3)	120 (4.7)	157 (6.2)	118 (4.6)	1,129 (44.4)
Average precipitation days (≥ 1 mm)	12.3	11.1	9.9	11.9	10.4	7.6	7.3	7.6	8.9	11.1	13.3	12.1	123.5
Average snowy days	0.4	0.3	0.1	0	0	0	0	0	0	0	0	0.1	0.9
Average relative humidity (%)	72	72	71	72	74	75	75	76	76	75	75	73	74
Mean monthly sunshine hours	85	104	135	149	172	178	187	180	160	129	93	74	1,649
Source: Agencia Estatal de Meteorología

== Demographics ==
Historical population

Year	Pop.	±%
1842	16,622	—
1857	28,907	+73.9%
1877	40,432	+39.9%
1887	42,234	+4.5%
1900	54,346	+28.7%
1910	62,482	+15.0%
1920	73,072	+16.9%
1930	79,226	+8.4%
1940	95,282	+20.3%

Year	Pop.	±%
1950	100,069	+5.0%
1960	114,430	+14.4%
1970	148,845	+30.1%
1981	179,694	+20.7%
1991	191,079	+6.3%
2001	180,717	−5.4%
2011	178,095	−1.5%
2021	172,000	−3.4%

Source: National Statistics Institute

== Tourism and sights ==
The bars and restaurants of the old town are popular with tourists, as well as the El Sardinero beach a couple of kilometres away.

The Cathedral of Santander: The lower temple, called "cripta del Cristo" was built around 1200 on other earlier Roman buildings. It is 31 metres (102 ft) long and 18 metres (59 ft) wide, organised into three naves. Its style is a transition from Romanesque to Gothic.

The Lighthouse of Cabo Mayor presides over the entrance to the Bay of Santander.

Parque de la Vaguada de las Llamas is one of the largest parks in northern Spain, covering 11 hectares (27 acres) of the city.

Santander is pilot for a smart city. It is embedded with 12,000 sensors.

Sights of Santander

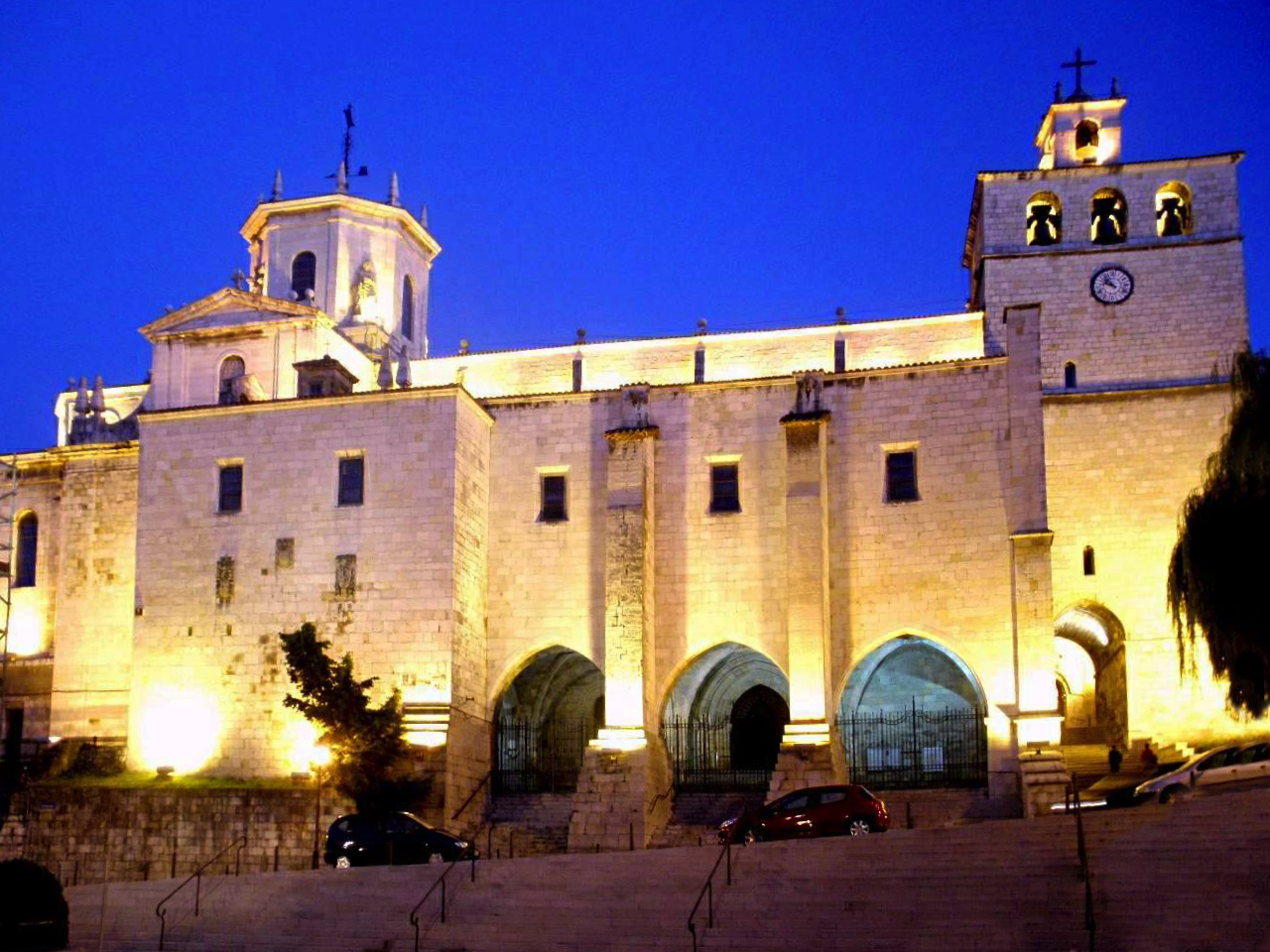
Santander Cathedral

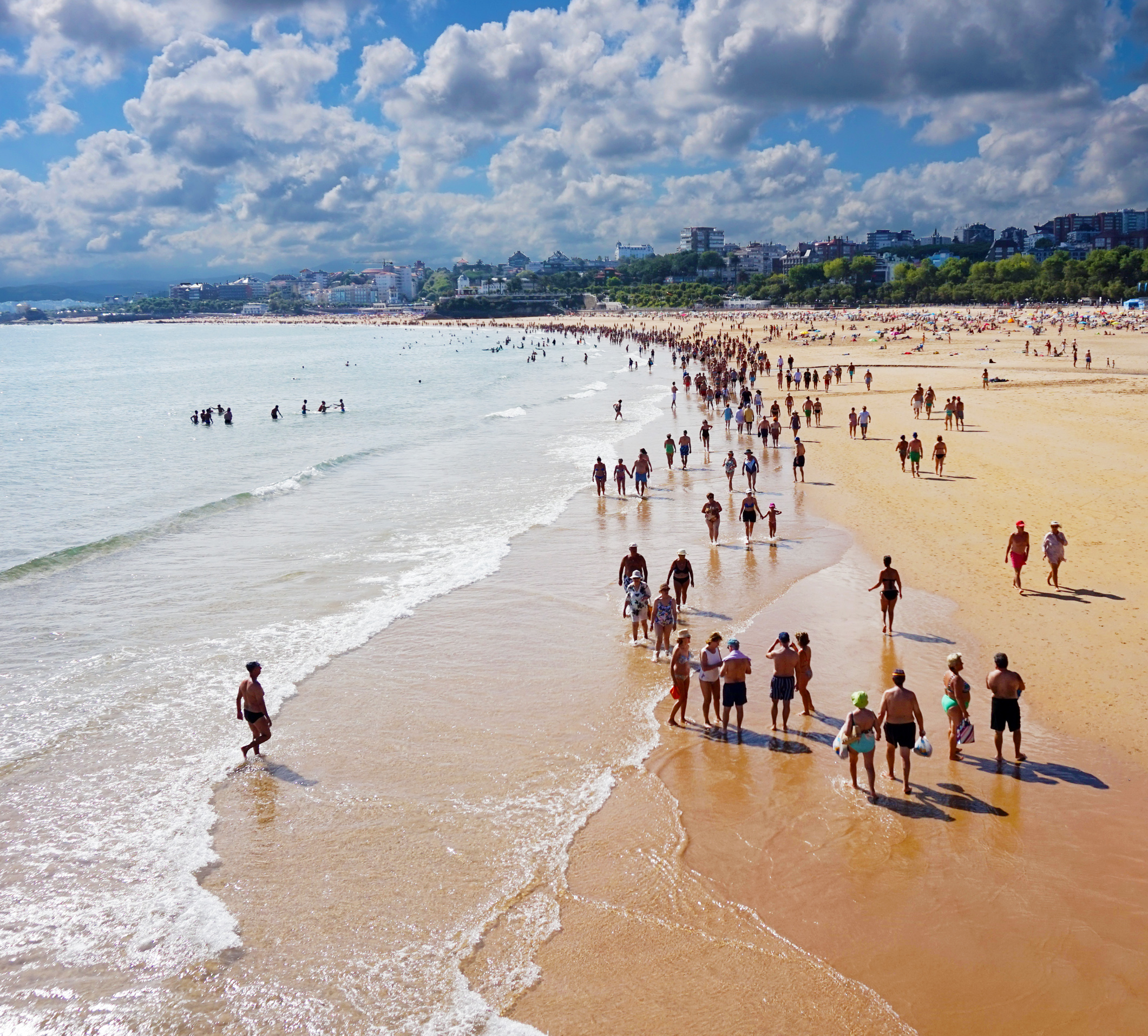
Beach of El Sardinero

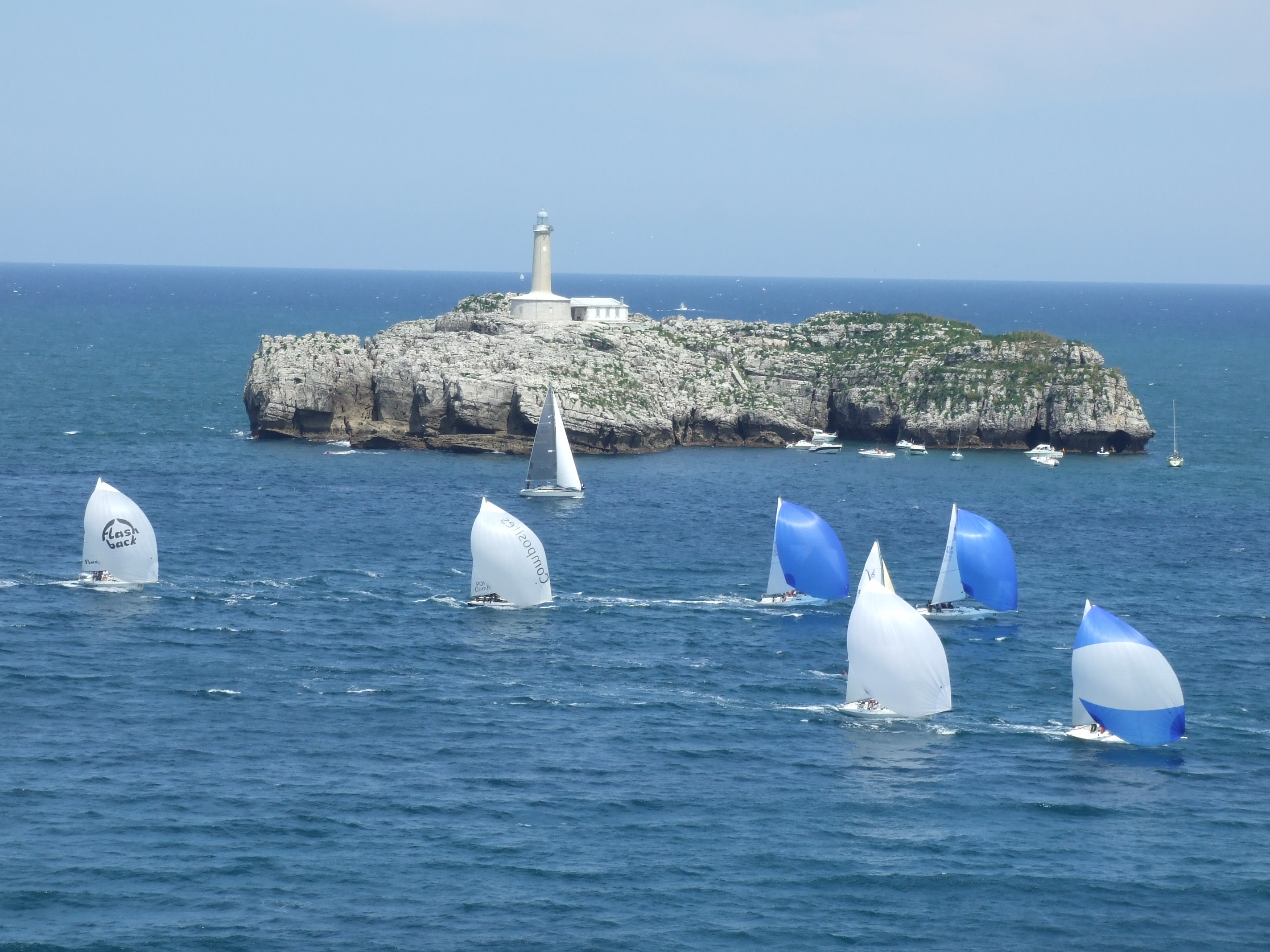
Mouro Island

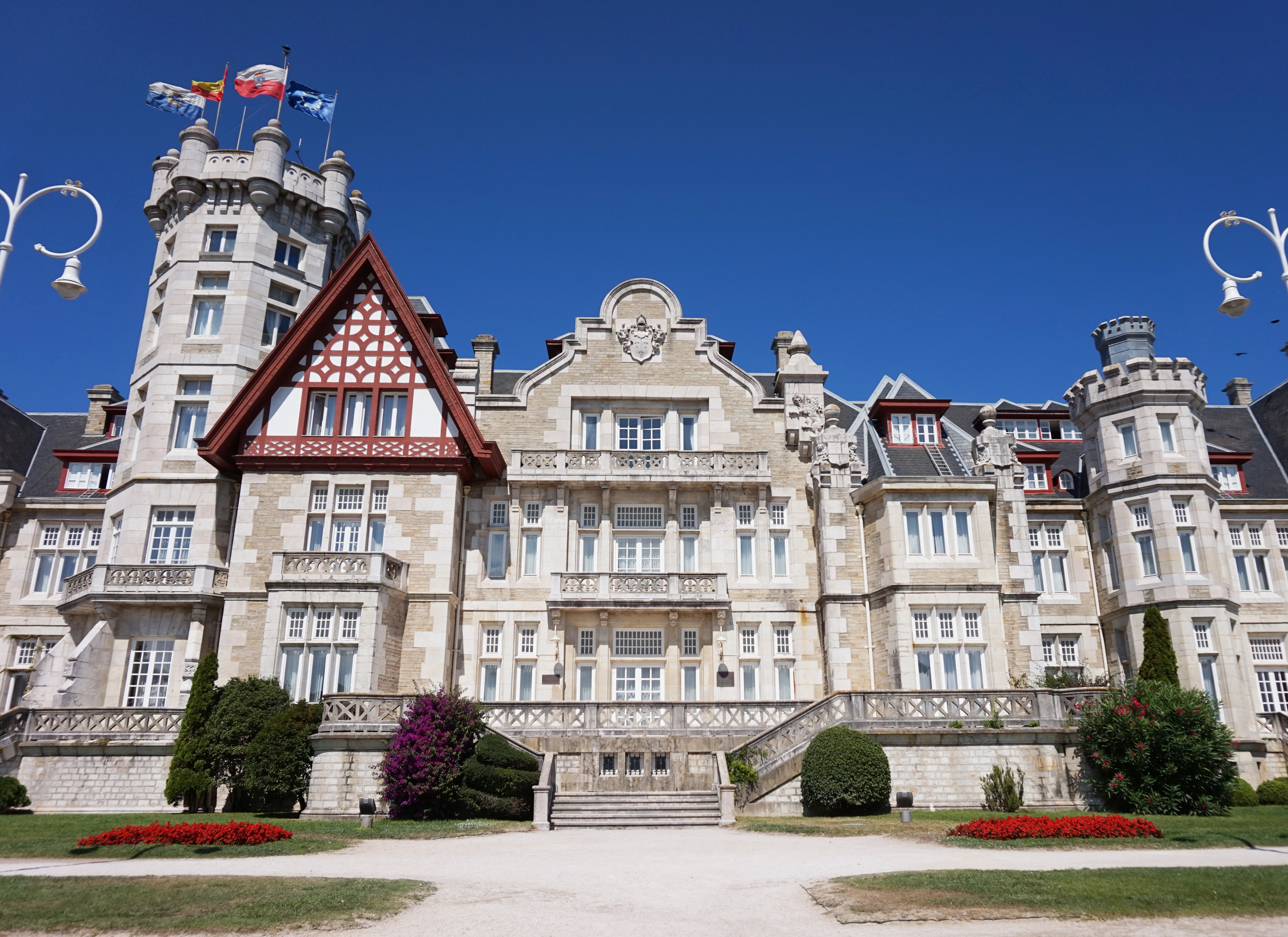
La Magdalena royal palace

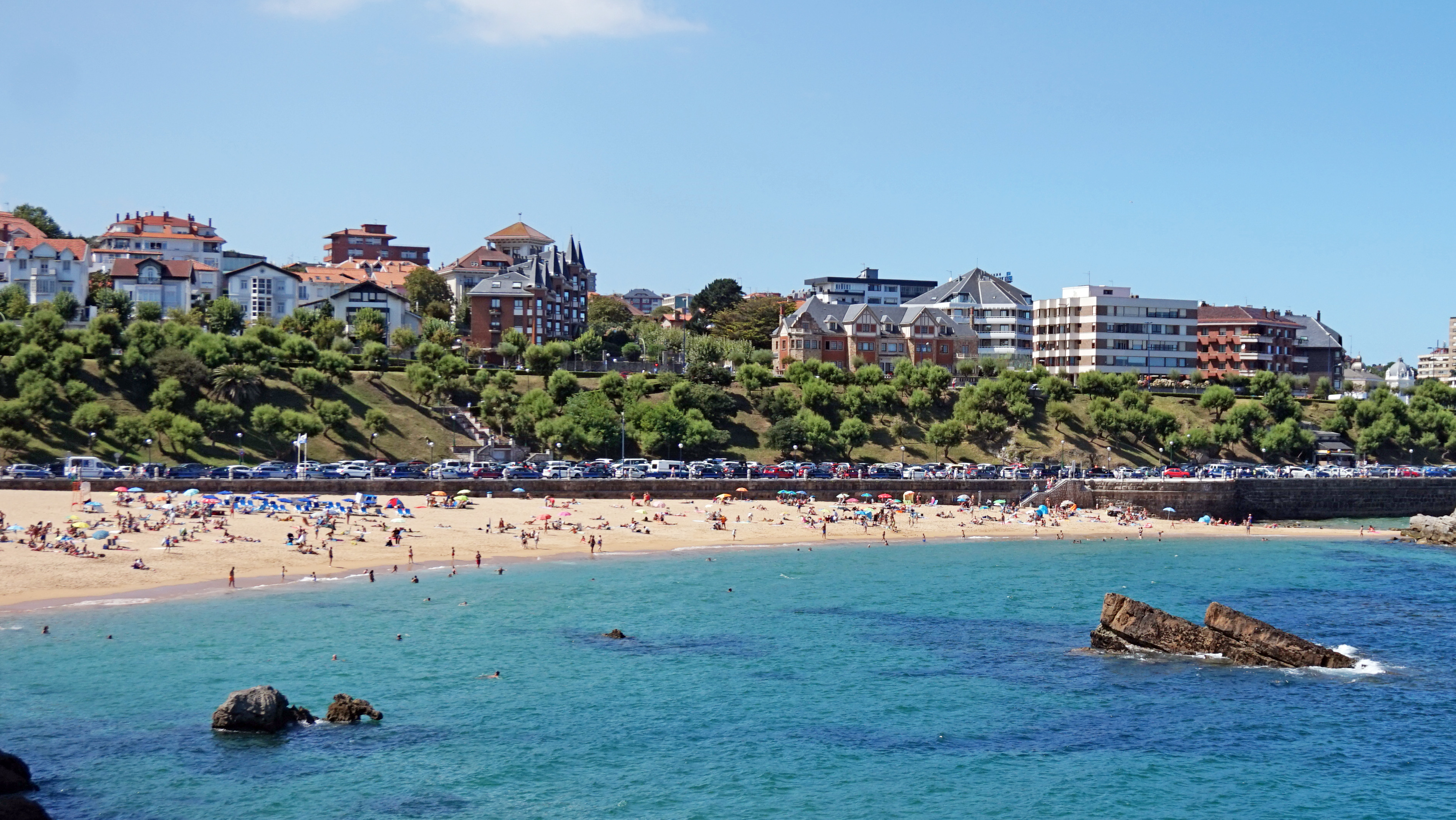
Playa del Camello

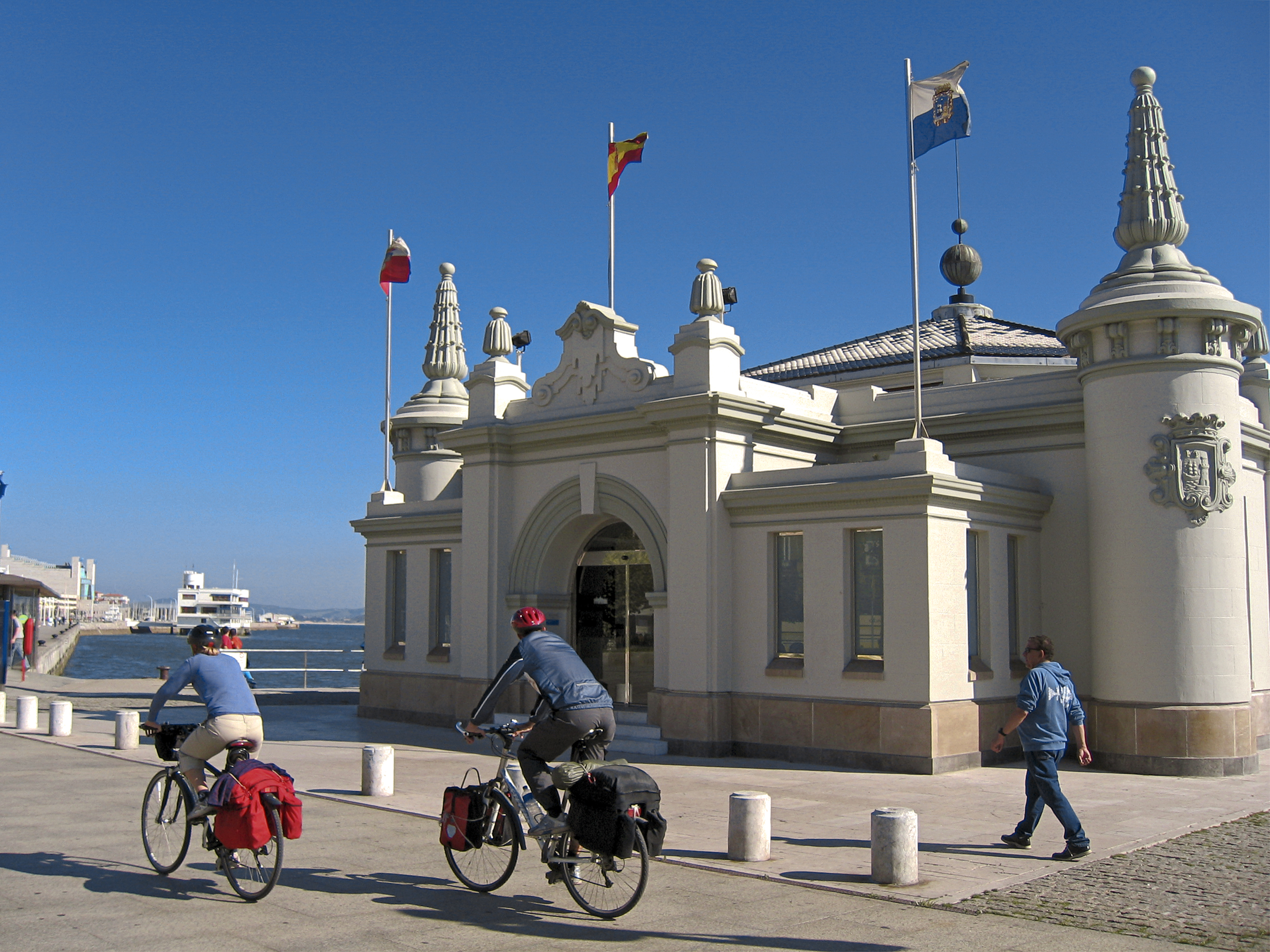
Palacio del Embarcadero

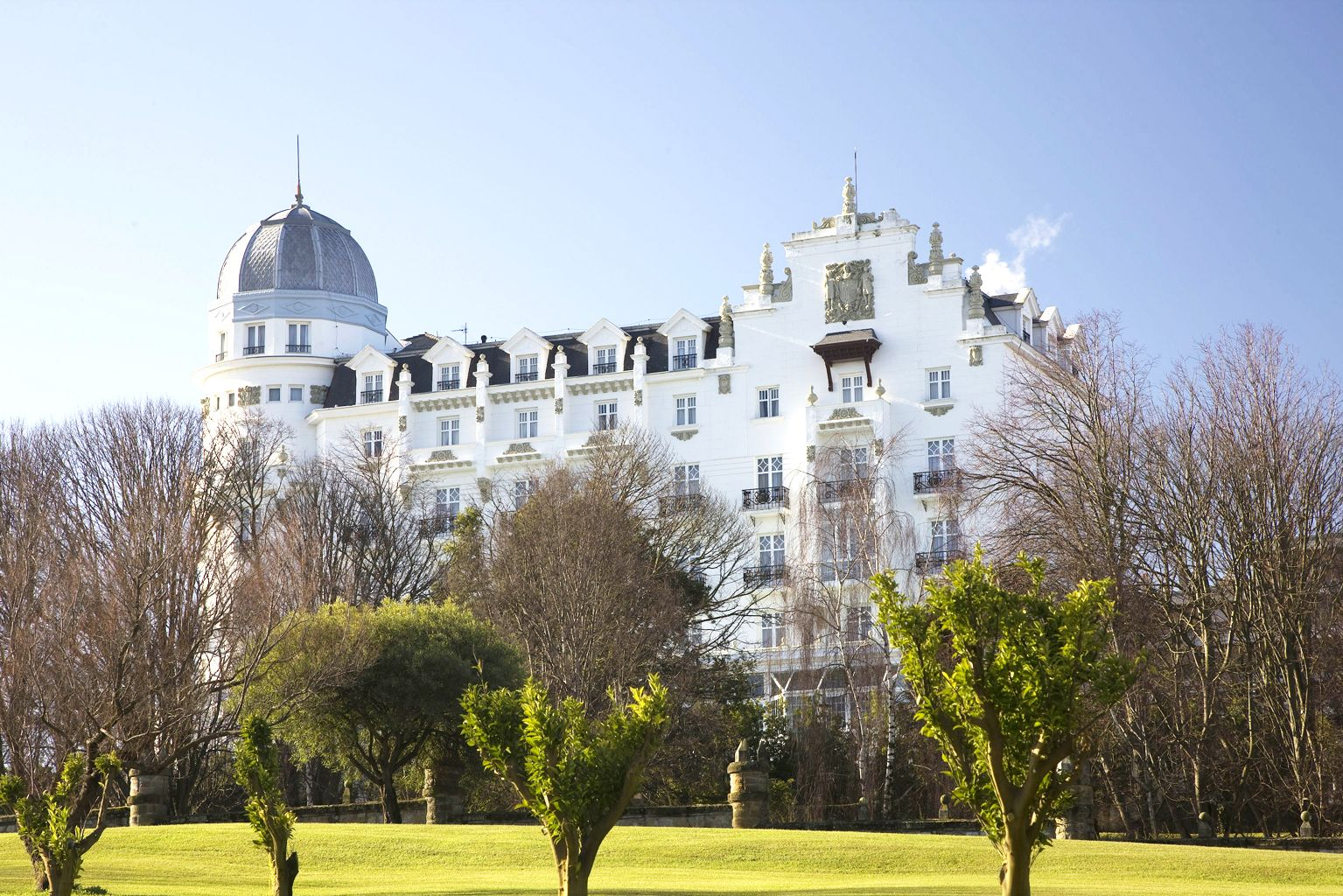
Hotel Real

== Politics and government ==
The People's Party were the leading party in the municipal elections of 1999, 2003, 2007, 2011, 2015, and 2019.

== Economy ==
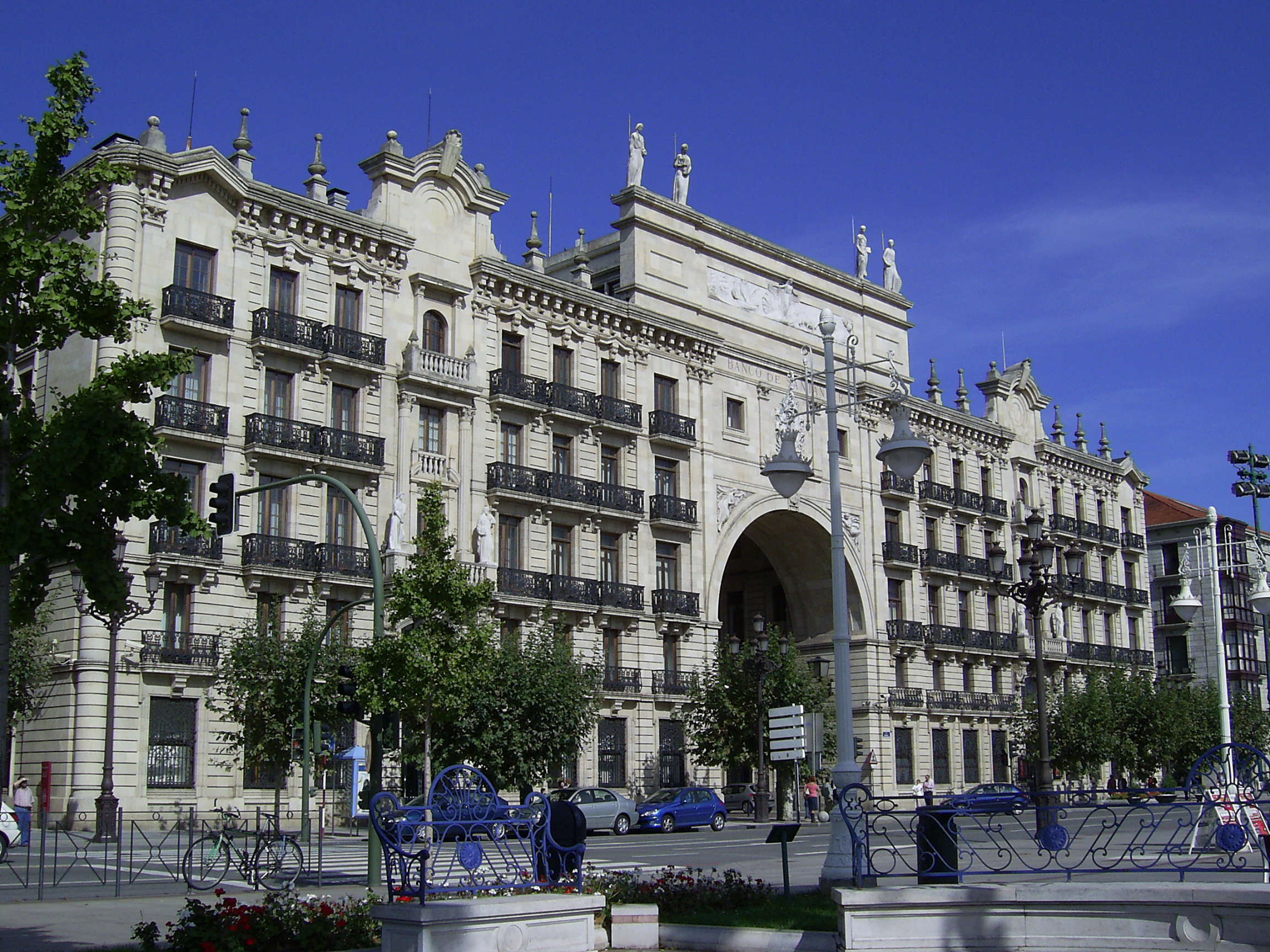
Building of Bank of Santander, where it originated and where it has its registered office.

As a service centre at the regional level, Santander contains important public institutions and private organisations with a large number of employees, including Marqués de Valdecilla University Hospital, the University of Cantabria and Grupo Santander. Activities related to culture, leisure and tourism are an important part of the city's economy, and the regional and municipal authorities look to augment the summer tourist trade with additional offerings, including conventions, conferences, cultural festivals and cruises. Banco Santander, Spain's largest bank and corporation, has had its legal headquarters located in the city since its foundation.

== Transport ==
There are ferry services to and from Portsmouth and Plymouth in the United Kingdom and Cork in Ireland, all operated by Brittany Ferries. Santander railway station serves three million annual passengers.

The city is served by the Seve Ballesteros–Santander Airport (SDR), located 4 kilometres (2.5 mi) south of the city centre.

== Education ==
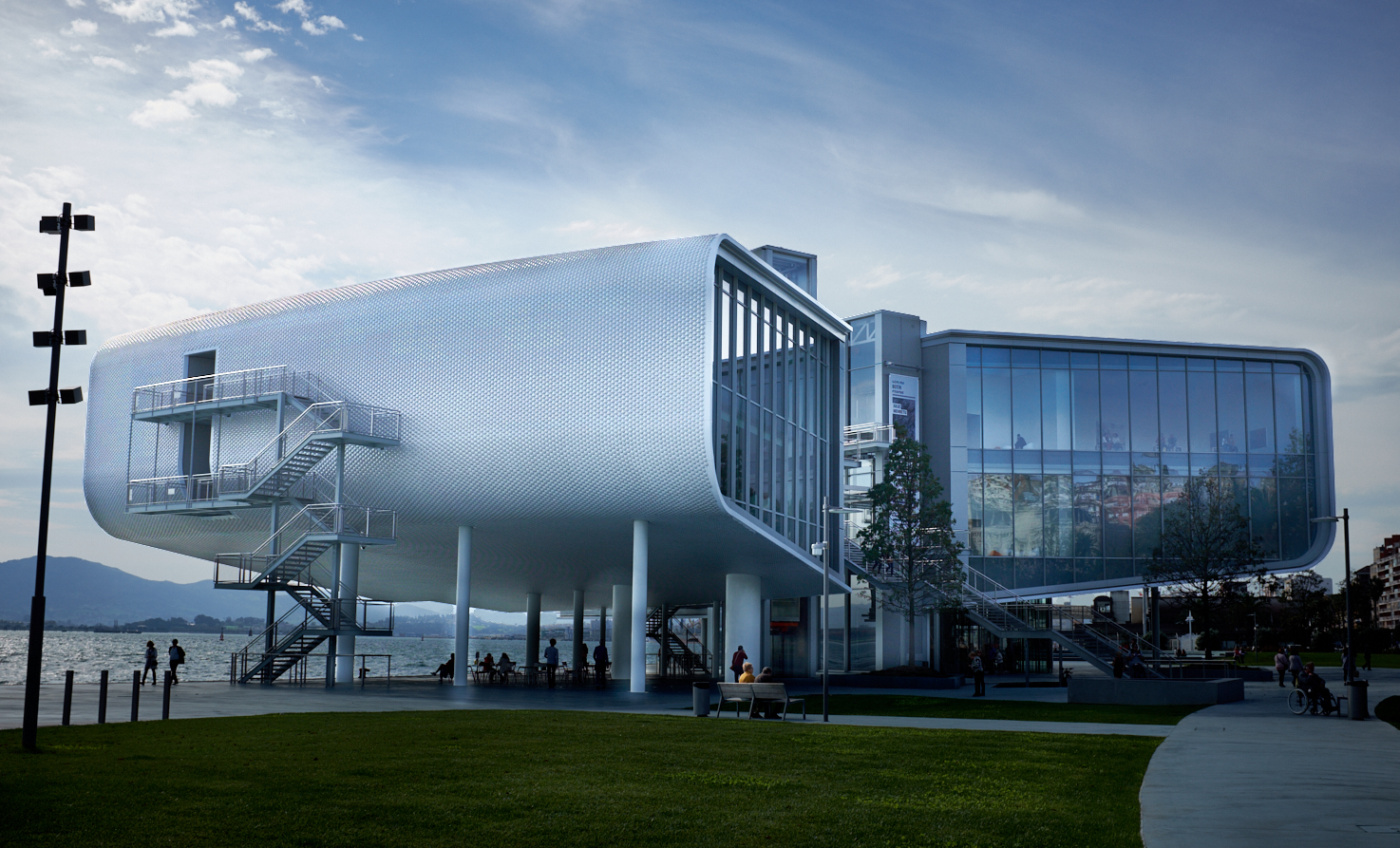
Centro Botín, cultural centre designed by Renzo Piano

- University of Cantabria is the largest university in Cantabria.
- European University of the Atlantic is a private university founded in 2013.
- Universidad Internacional Menéndez Pelayo (UIMP) specializes in teaching Spanish and culture to foreign students.
- Central Library of Cantabria, founded in 1839

== Culture ==
Santander has a great tradition and cultural activity, with events that play an important role in cultural and social life of the city. UIMP is a major international summer university and organizes large festivals of music and dance. The Festival Internacional de Santander (FIS), Festival Internacional de Música de Órgano (FiMÓC), Encuentro de Música y Academia and the Paloma O'Shea International Piano Competition are main cultural events.

=== Diet ===
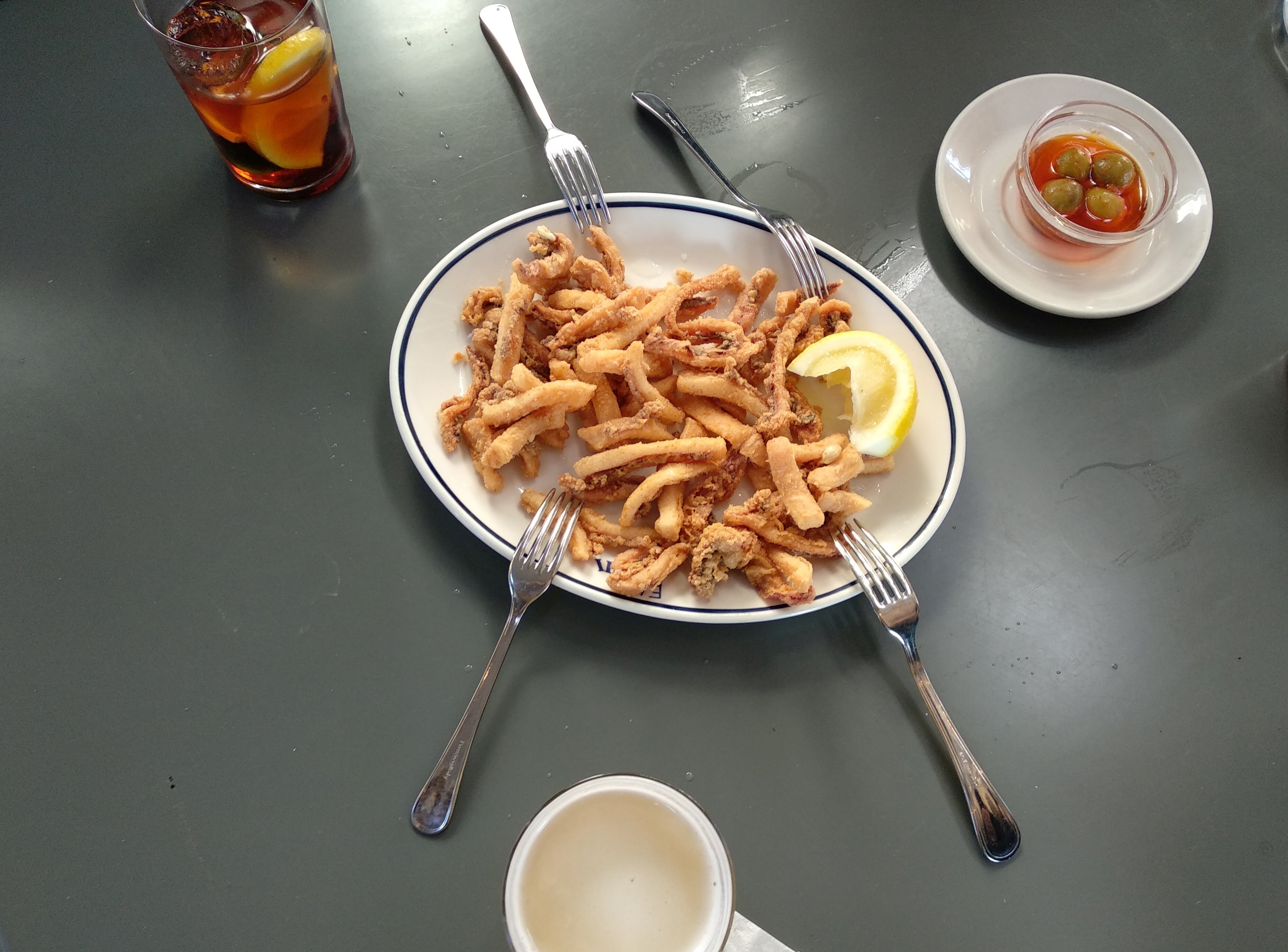
Rabas

Santander's cuisine is characteristic of Cantabria in that it is based mainly on seafood. Popular shellfish include almejas (clams) and muergos (razor clams); fish include seabream, red mullet, anchovies, seabass and sardines; and squid and cuttlefish are also commonly eaten.

Some typical dishes from the city of Santander are the fried calamari called rabas, double donuts, bean stew called cocido montañés, and seafood dishes ranging from seabass and sardine to products such as morguera.

== Notable people ==
=== Historical figures ===
- Francisco Marroquín (1478–1563), first bishop of Guatemala and provisional Governor of Guatemala
- Toribio de Peñalva (c.1606-c.1685), Spanish military man, Procurator General of Buenos Aires during the Viceroyalty of Peru
- Manuel Pardo (1774–?), a Spanish soldier, the Interim Governor of Spanish Texas in 1817
- José de Madrazo y Agudo (1781–1859), a Spanish painter and engraver, an exponent of the Neoclassical

=== 19th century ===
- Jenaro Quesada, 1st Marquis of Miravalles (1818–1889), Grandee of Spain and Spanish soldier
- José Antonio Mijares (1819–1847), a Mexican Army Lieutenant who led the Mexican resistance force against the American garrison of San José del Cabo in the Battle of San José del Cabo
- Rafael Izquierdo y Gutiérrez (1820–1883), a Spanish Military Officer, politician, and statesman; Governor-General of the Philippines from 1871 to 1873
- Marcelino Sanz de Sautuola (1831–1888), a Spanish jurist, amateur archaeologist, owned the land of the Cave of Altamira
- Marcelino Menéndez y Pelayo (1856–1912), a Spanish scholar, historian and literary critic.
- Francisco Iturrino (1864–1924), a Spanish Post-impressionist painter of Basque ancestry, sometimes called a Fauvist
- Concha Espina (c.1877–1955), a Spanish writer nominated for a Nobel Prize in Literature 25 times in nine years
- Marcial Solana González-Camino (1880–1958), a Spanish scholar, writer and politician; historian of philosophy
- María Gutiérrez Blanchard (1881–1932), a Spanish painter, developed a unique style of Cubism
- Ángel Herrera Oria (1886–1968), a Spanish journalist, Roman Catholic politician and later a cardinal
- Gerardo Diego (1896–1987), a Spanish poet, a member of the Generation of '27

=== 20th century ===
- Emilio Botín (1903–1993), a Spanish banker, the chairman of Santander Group from 1950 to 1986
- José Luis Zamanillo (1903–1980), a Traditionalist politician and leader of Carlist paramilitary Requeté structures
- Francisco de Borbón y Borbón (1912–1995), a Spanish aristocrat, Lieutenant General of the cavalry in the Spanish army
- Matilde Camus (1919–2012), a Spanish poet who also wrote non-fiction
- Elena Quiroga (1921–1995), Spanish writer, explored the themes of childhood and adolescence
- Daniel Gil (1930–2004), one of the leading Spanish graphic designers of the 20th century
- Emilio Botín (1934–2014), a Spanish banker, executive chairman of Spain's Grupo Santander
- Juan Carlos Calderon (1938–2012), a Spanish singer-songwriter and musician
- Álvaro Pombo (born 1939), a Spanish poet, novelist and activist
- Juan Navarro Baldeweg (born 1939), architect and professor at the Superior Technical School of Architecture of Madrid
- Alfonso Vallejo (1943–2021), playwright, poet, painter and neurologist
- Germán Gullón (born 1945), literary critic, writer and professor of Spanish literature at the University of Amsterdam
- Domingo Sarrey (born 1948), a visual artist and video artist.
- José Antonio Rodríguez Vega (1957–2002), nicknamed El Mataviejas (The Old Lady Killer), was a Spanish serial killer who raped and killed at least 16 elderly women in and around Santander between August 1987 and April 1988
- Paco San José (born 1958), Cantabrian music composer
- Álvaro Longoria (born 1968), a film director, executive producer and actor

=== Athletes ===
- Francisco "Paco" Gento López (21 October 1933 - 18 January 2022), nicknamed Paco, was a Spanish footballer, or soccer player, who made 437 appearances between Racing Santander and Real Madrid and scored a total of 129 goals in his professional career. He played for the National Spanish team in 43 matches, scoring 5 goals.
- Marcos Alonso Imaz (1933–2012), nicknamed Marquitos, was a Spanish footballer, 272 pro appearances
- José Pérez Francés (1936–2021), a Spanish former professional road racing cyclist
- Francisco Javier Aguilar Garcia (1949–2020), a Spanish retired professional footballer, 300 pro appearances
- Seve Ballesteros (1957–2011), a Spanish professional golfer and World No. 1
- Quique Setién (born 1958), a Spanish retired footballer, 518 pro appearances, former coach of FC Barcelona
- Marcos Alonso Peña (1959–2023), a Spanish retired footballer, and a coach, 309 pro appearances
- Iván Helguera (born 1975), a Spanish football player, 326 pro appearances
- Pedro Munitis (born 1975), a Spanish football player, 475 pro appearances
- Iván de la Peña (born 1976), a Spanish football player, 331 pro appearances
- Mario Bermejo (born 1978), a Spanish retired professional footballer, 546 pro appearances
- Ruth Beitia (born 1979), high jumper, gold medallist at the 2016 Olympic Games
- Gonzalo Colsa (born 1979), a Spanish retired footballer 394 pro appearances
- Mateo Joseph (born 2003), a Spanish footballer for Leeds United and the Spain national under-21 football team.

== Sports ==
Racing de Santander is the main football team in the city, playing their home games at the Campos de Sport de El Sardinero.

Some elite teams of Santander:

Club	Sport	Ligue	Stadium
Racing de Santander	Football	Primera División	Campos de Sport de El Sardinero
GoFit Sinfín	Handball	Liga ASOBAL	Pabellón Municipal de La Albericia
Cantbasket and CD Estela	Basketball	Liga EBA	Palacio de Deportes de Santander
Balonmano Pereda	Women's handball	División de Honor B	Pabellón de Numancia
Real Sociedad de Tenis de La Magdalena	Field hockey	Honour Division	La Albericia
Señor Independiente	Rugby Union	Honour Division	Mies de Cozada

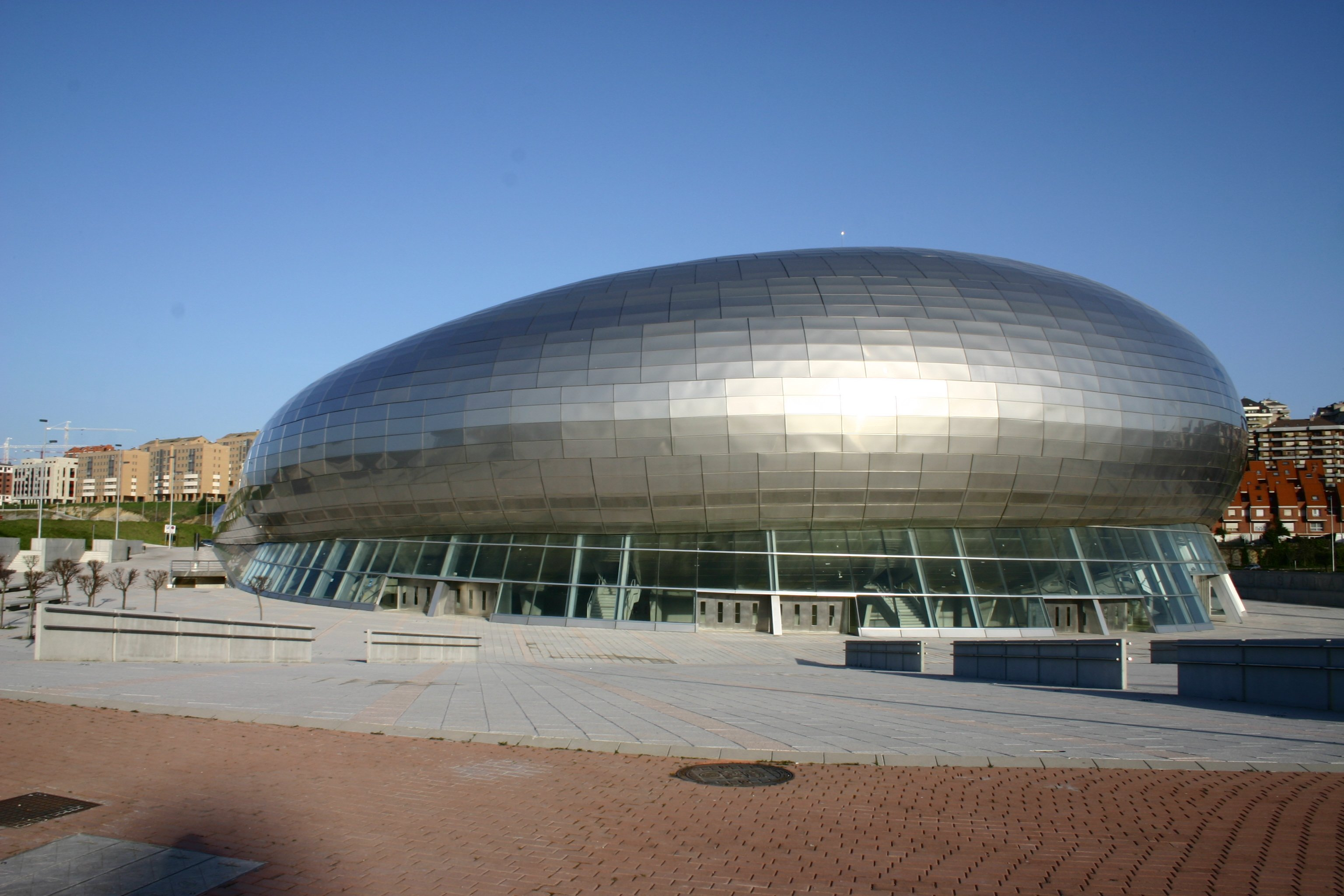
Palacio de Deportes in El Sardinero next to the Campos de Sport de El Sardinero

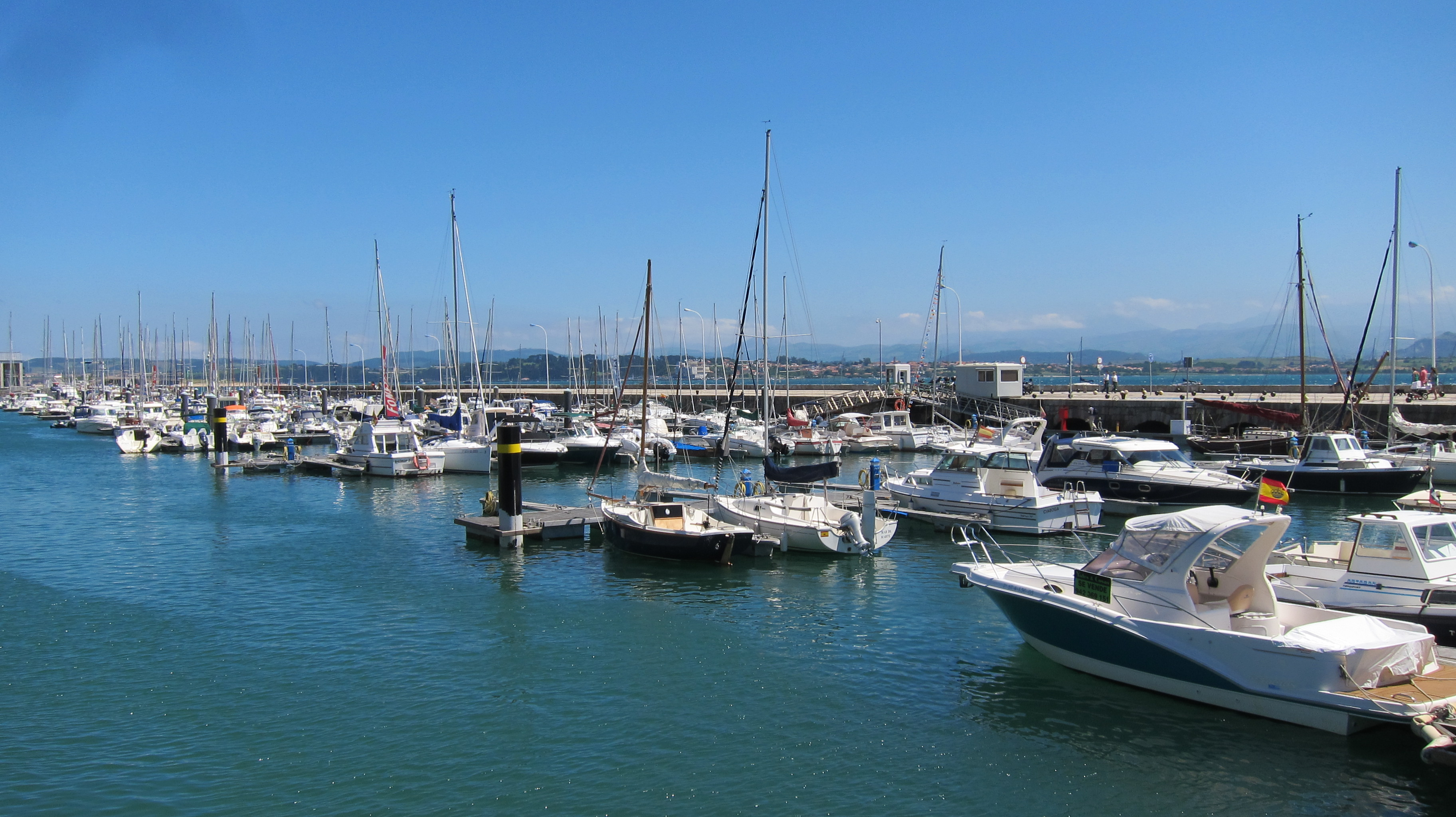
Sporting marina in Puertochico

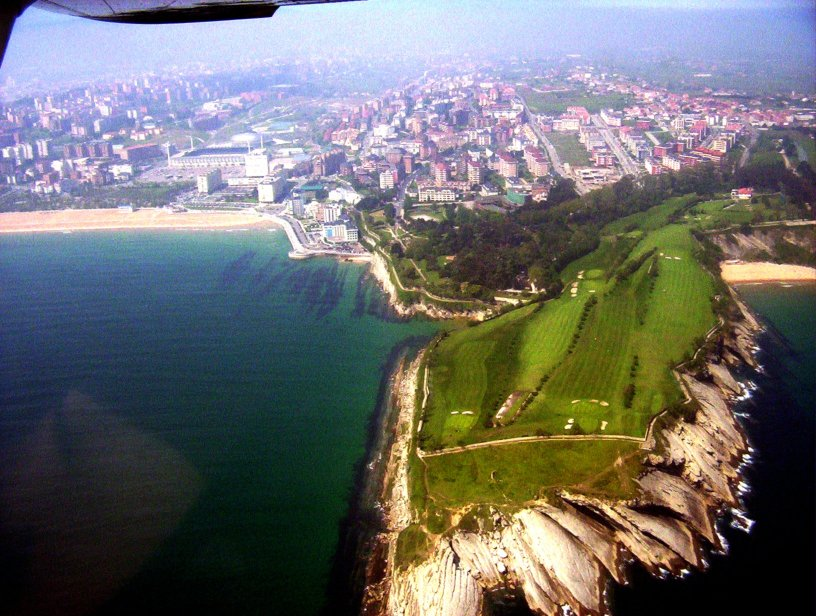
Mataleñas municipal golf fields, in Cape Menor

== See also ==
- Nuevo Santander, a region of the Viceroyalty of New Spain named after the city
- Hermandad de las Cuatro Villas
