= Casa de juntas de Puente San Miguel =

Historical meeting house in Puente San Miguel, Cantabria

Casa de Juntas de Puente San Miguel
- Casa de juntas de Puente San Miguel
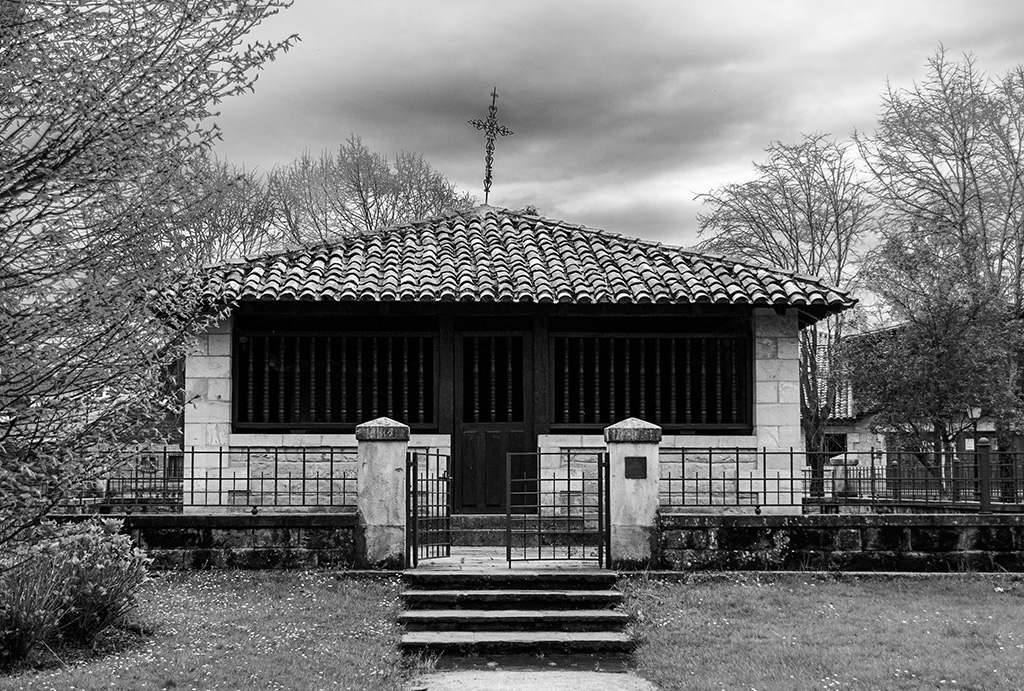
- The reconstructed Casa de Juntas in Puente San Miguel
- Interactive map of the Casa de Juntas de Puente San Miguel area

General information
- Type: Meeting house
- Architectural style: Traditional Cantabrian civic architecture
- Location: Puente San Miguel, Reocín, Cantabria, Spain
- Coordinates: 43°21′37″N 4°05′07″W
- Construction started: 1581
- Renovated: 1994
- Demolished: 19th century
- Owner: Ayuntamiento de Reocín

The meeting house of Puente San Miguel (Spanish: Casa de juntas de Puente San Miguel), also known as the meeting house of the Nine Valleys, is a small building located in Puente San Miguel (Cantabria, Spain). It is best known for hosting, on 28 July 1778, the assembly of deputies of the Province of the Nine Valleys of the Asturias of Santillana who met there to create the Province of Cantabria, the first modern and fully structured provincial administrative system in the territory that today forms the autonomous community of Cantabria. Before this date, the building served as the meeting place for the deputies of the Nine Valleys. The principal function of the assembly, similar to those of Asturias and the Basque provinces, was to defend provincial interests from royal authority, with special regard for local fueros, customs, privileges, freedoms, franchises, and jurisdictional, governmental, fiscal, and military matters.

In 1801, as a result of the territorial policies of Charles IV, the Puente San Miguel assembly and the Province of Cantabria ceased to exist. The Maritime province of Santander was then created by royal decree and made official in 1815. Meetings in the assembly house ended in 1824; the building was later auctioned and demolished. In 1994, it was faithfully reconstructed as a symbol of the origins of modern Cantabria. The regional president delivers a commemorative address there each year during the celebration of the Día de las Instituciones de Cantabria on 28 July, marking the anniversary of the historic 1778 assembly.

The building itself is a small, simple structure with a square floor plan and a hipped roof, built in stone, with the entrance wall partially open and constructed of wood. Inside, the coat of arms of Cantabria appears carved into the walls, alongside those of the municipalities that made up the Province of the Nine Valleys: Alfoz de Lloredo, Cabezón de la Sal, Cabuérniga, Camargo, Santa María de Cayón, Penagos, Piélagos, Reocín, and Villaescusa. Dominating the room above the stone presidential table is a wooden rendering of the logo of the Parliament of Cantabria.

== Meetings of the Nine Valleys ==
The building was erected at the beginning of the Early modern period (1581) on the occasion of the administrative and jurisdictional independence of the Nine Valleys from the Asturias of Santillana. This independence was sought in order to free the valleys from the lordship exercised over them by the dukes of the Infantado. The building thus became both the symbol of independence and the capital of the new province of the Nine Valleys of the Asturias of Santillana, established after long disputes known collectively as the Pleito de los Nueve Valles.

In 1645, the assembly obtained the General Ordinances of the Province. At that time, the position of general deputy was created, and the assembly was opened to other jurisdictions and lordships. This openness later made possible the proposal for establishing the Province of Cantabria. The building would thereafter host the assemblies of the Nine Valleys and, later, of Cantabria.

== Meetings of Cantabria ==
The open character of the assembly proved decisive in the creation of a province capable of uniting the territory, something the Four Coastal Towns had failed to accomplish decades earlier. However, this province was short-lived. From the beginning, Santander displayed a certain arrogance, wishing to claim the capital and never fully accepting its membership in the new province. Ultimately, the decisive setback came from the Crown, which decreed the creation of new provinces—called “maritime provinces”—including that of Santander. This designation granted Santander the prominence it sought, thanks in part to its revitalized connection with Castile following the construction of the Reinosa road.
