= Muriedas =

- Locality
- Location in Spain
- Coordinates: 43°25′49″N 3°51′37″W
- Country: Spain
- Autonomous community: Cantabria
- Province: Cantabria
- Comarca: Bay of Santander
- Municipality: Camargo
- Judicial district: Santander
- Elevation: 35 m (115 ft)

Population (2012)
  - Total: 13,216
- Time zone: UTC+1 (CET)
  - Summer (DST): UTC+2 (CEST)
- Postal code: 39600

Muriedas is the capital of the municipality of Camargo (Cantabria, Spain). The town is situated 7 kilometers from Santander. Within just 2 kilometers away is the Santander Airport, which is located in Maliaño, in the town of Camargo, as well as the bay and harbor.
