= Villaescusa =

Villaescusa can refer to:

- Villaescusa, Cantabria, Spain
- Villaescusa, Zamora, Spain
- Villaescusa de Haro, Cuenca, Spain
- Villaescusa de Roa, Burgos, Spain
- Villaescusa la Sombría, Burgos, Spain
