= El Sardinero =

Sardinero may refer to:

- Estadio El Sardinero, a sports stadium in Santander, Cantabria, Spain
  - Estadio El Sardinero (1913), the old stadium in Santander, Cantabria, Spain
- Sardinero, a beach in Santander, Cantabria, Spain
