= Palacio de la Magdalena =

Coordinates: 43°28′09″N 3°45′58″W

Magdalena Palace
- Palacio de la Magdalena
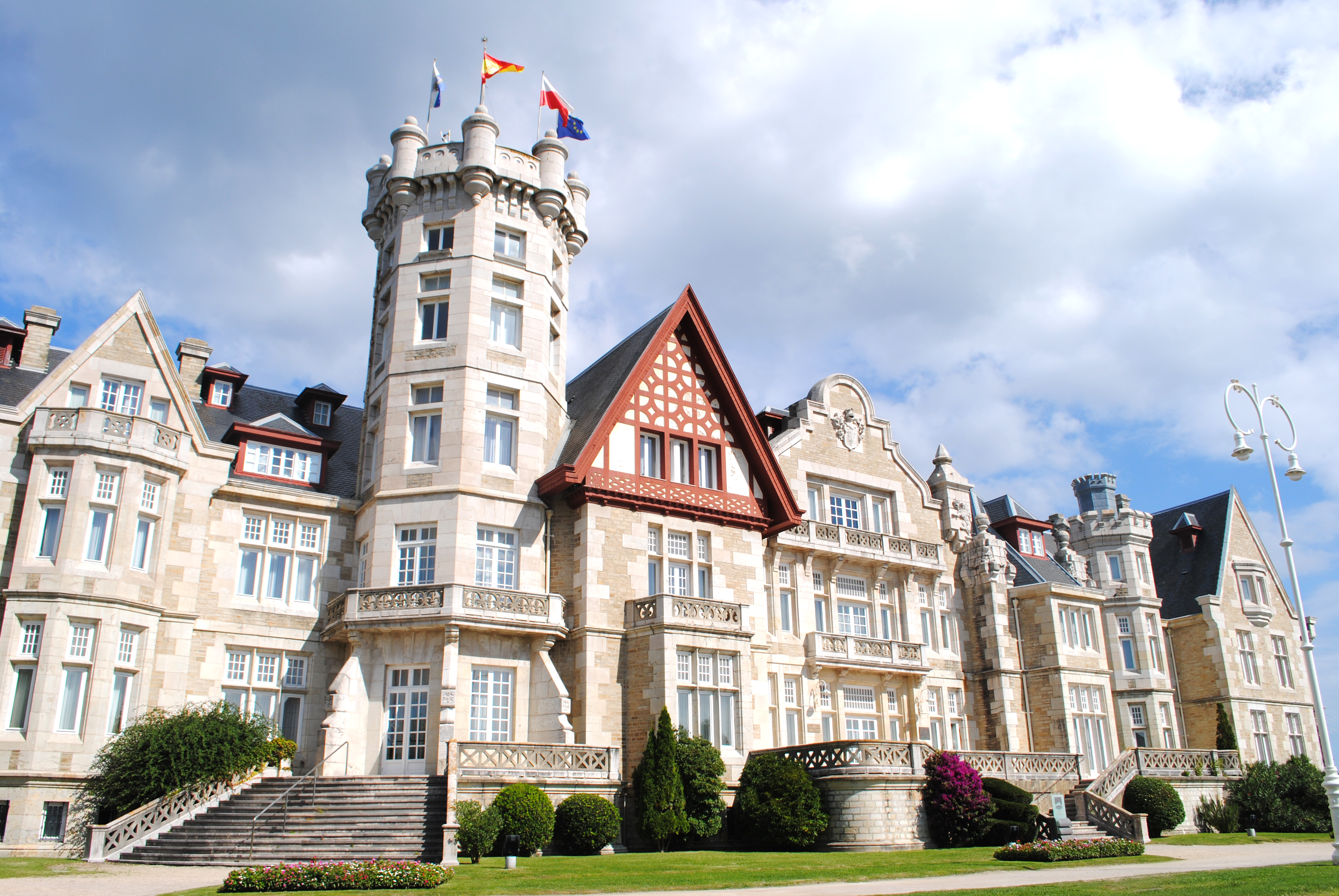

General information
- Location: Santander (Cantabria). Spain
- Current tenants: Menéndez Pelayo International University
- Owner: City Council of Santander

Design and construction
- Architect(s): Javier González Riancho; Gonzalo Bringas Vega

Spanish Cultural Heritage
- Official name: Palacio de la Magdalena y sus Jardínes
- Type: Non-movable
- Criteria: Monument
- Designated: 12 February 1982
- Reference no.: RI-51-0004592

The Palacio de la Magdalena (Spanish for Magdalena Palace) is a palace in Santander (Cantabria), Spain. Its construction was financed by popular subscription and given to the Spanish royal family for use as a summer residence. It was built by architects Javier González Riancho and Gonzalo Bringas Vega between 1909 and 1911. The palace is located at the Magdalena Peninsula in the place where the old Fort of San Salvador de Hano was, which protected the entrance to the bay. Since 1932, it hosts the summer courses of the Menéndez Pelayo International University. In 1977, the City Council of Santander bought back the palace and the peninsula.

== History ==
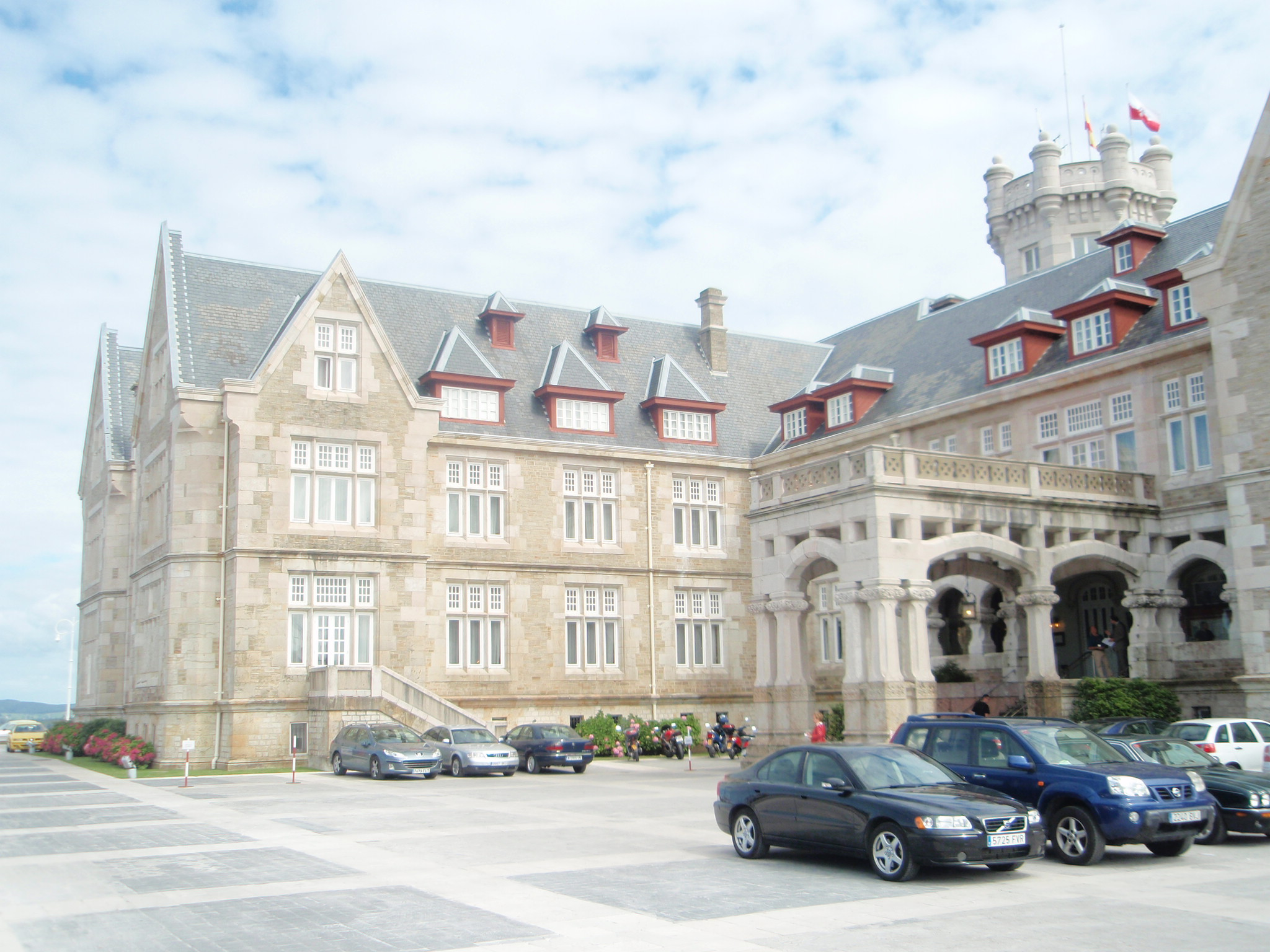
Entrance for carriages (right half of the northwest elevation)

Construction of the palace was initiated in 1908 by the local government of Santander for the purpose of providing a seasonal residence for the royal family of Spain. Funding was provided via popular subscription of the local populace.

The design and construction of the palace were overseen by architects Javier González de Riancho and Gonzalo Bringas Vega, with construction completed in 1912. King Alfonso XIII and his family first arrived at the Palacio de la Magdalena on August 4, 1913, and returned annually to summer at the palace through 1930. The royal family used the palace as a base for numerous recreational and sporting activities, and the king sometimes also held government meetings at the property. The annual trips ended with the proclamation of the Second Spanish Republic in 1931.

Beginning in 1932, the palace was used to host summer courses through the Menéndez Pelayo International University. In 1977, the Count of Barcelona sold the palace and the peninsula back to the city of Santander for 150 million pesetas. The palace was declared an historical monument in 1982 and renovated between 1993 and 1995. It is the most visited place in the city of Santander and continues to be used as a conference and meeting hall to the present day.

== Design ==
The building has an eclectic style, combining English, French, and regional architectural styles. It has two points of entry, a north entrance with a Porte-cochère for carriages, and a second entrance to the south which was designed as the main entrance. The building is covered with stone masonry slate. The highlight of the interior is the reception rooms, which hold paintings of interest by artists such as Luis Benedito, Joaquín Sorolla y Bastida, and Fernando Alvarez Sotomayor.

The stables were designed by Javier González de Riancho. They emulate a medieval English village with sharp roofs of steep slopes and wooden tiles. After summer courses were started, the stables were converted to student dormitories.

The palace is also used in external shots for the Spanish TV series Gran Hotel.
