= La Fuente de Cacho =

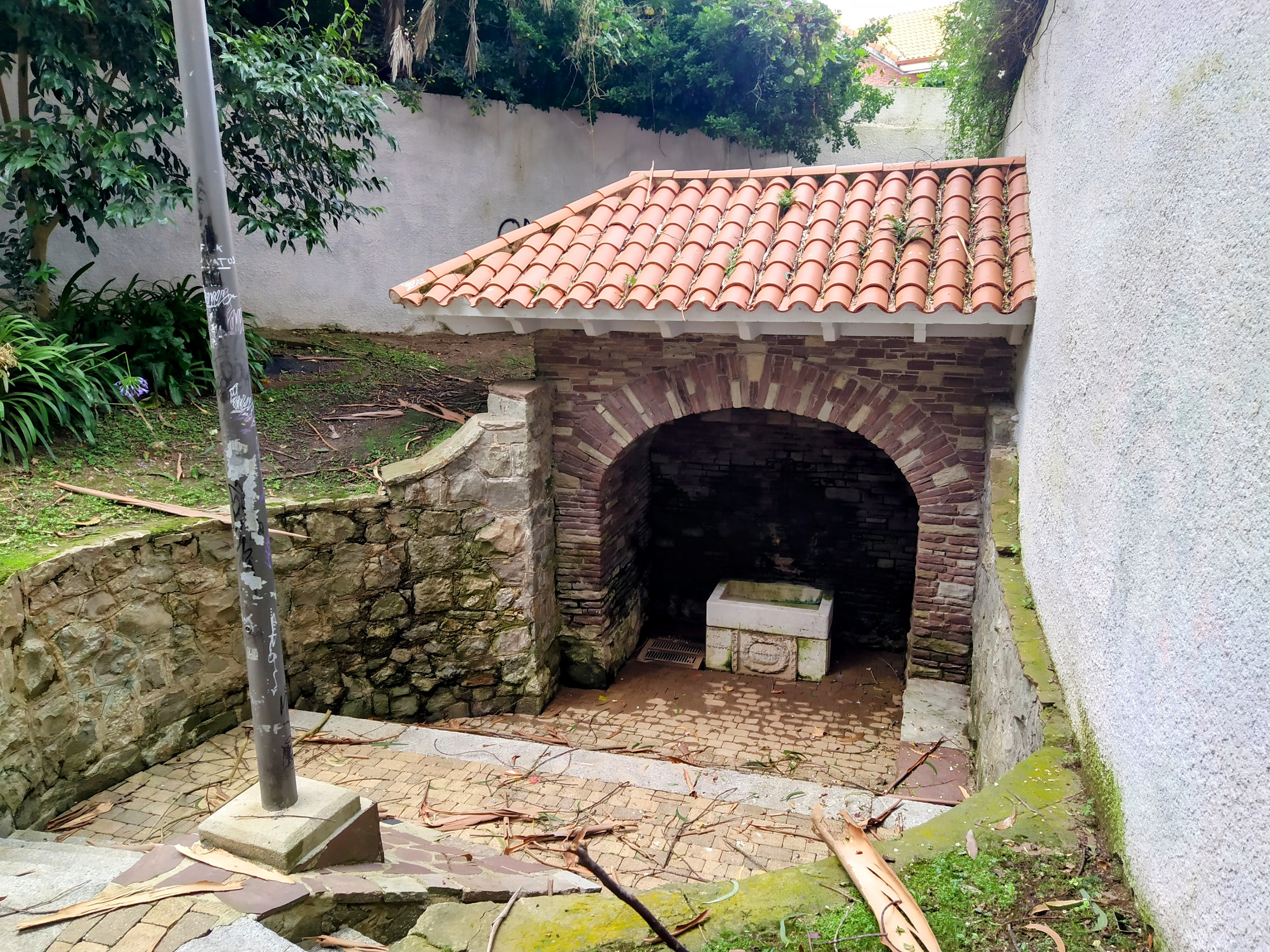
Cacho Fountain in the city of Santander.

"La Fuente de Cacho" is a Cantabrian traditional song. Its origin is disputed. Some scholars think it was written by Emilio Carral who was an anarchist watchmaker, leader of the Movimiento Obrero and founder of the Coros Montañeses. It speaks about a dark hair lady that goes to the fountain to take a glass of water because it is said to be very good early in the morning.

His name comes from a fountain located in Santander. Located in Antonio Maura's avenue, close to casino. Some authors think that that fountain was named cacho's fountain in honor of Manuel Cacho who was a landlord of many terrains down the Sardinero.

The song is now used by Racing de Santander fans to encourage their team at the beginning of each match although originally it had nothing to do with football.

The song reads:

Ayer te vi que subías

por la alameda primera

luciendo la saya blanca

y el «pañueluco» de seda.

Dime dónde vas morena,

dime dónde vas salada,

dime dónde vas morena

a las dos de la mañana.

Voy a la fuente de Cacho

a beber un vaso de agua

que me han dicho que es muy buena

beberla por la mañana.

Dime dónde vas morena,

dime dónde vas salada,

dime dónde vas morena,

a las dos de la mañana.

Voy al jardín de Valencia

a decirle al jardinero

que me dé una rosa blanca,

que en mi jardín no las tengo.

Dime dónde vas morena,

dime dónde vas salada,

dime dónde vas morena,

a las dos de la mañana.
