= Mouro Island =

Uninhabited island off the coast of Spain

Native name: Isla de Mouro
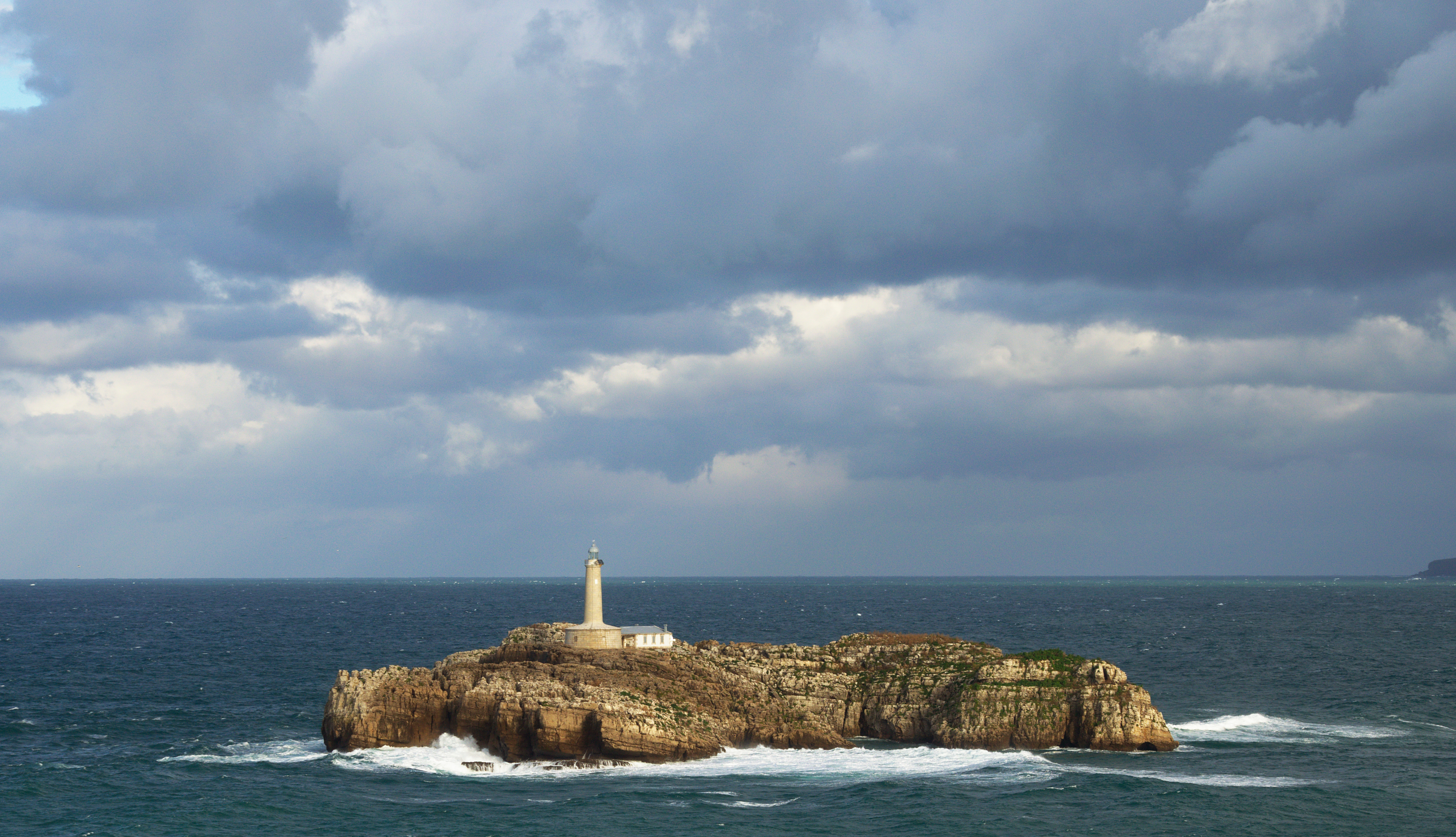
- Mouro Island in 2014

- Location within Cantabria

Geography
- Location: Bay of Santander
- Coordinates: 43.473421°N 3.755768°W
- Area: 2 ha (4.9 acres)
- Highest elevation: 27.5 m (90.2 ft)

Administration
- Spain
- City: Santander, Spain
- Autonomous community: Cantabria
- Comarca: Bay of Santander

Demographics
- Population: 0

Mouro Island (Spanish: Isla de Mouro), originally Mogro Island or Peña de Mogru (Isla de Mogro), is a small uninhabited island in the Bay of Biscay, located off the Magdalena Peninsula. It lies close to the entrance to the Bay of Santander near the city of Santander, Cantabria along the north coast of Spain. The island is approximately 2 hectares (0.02 km^{2}) in area and lies about .75 km (.5 mi) from the entrance to the harbor.

== History ==
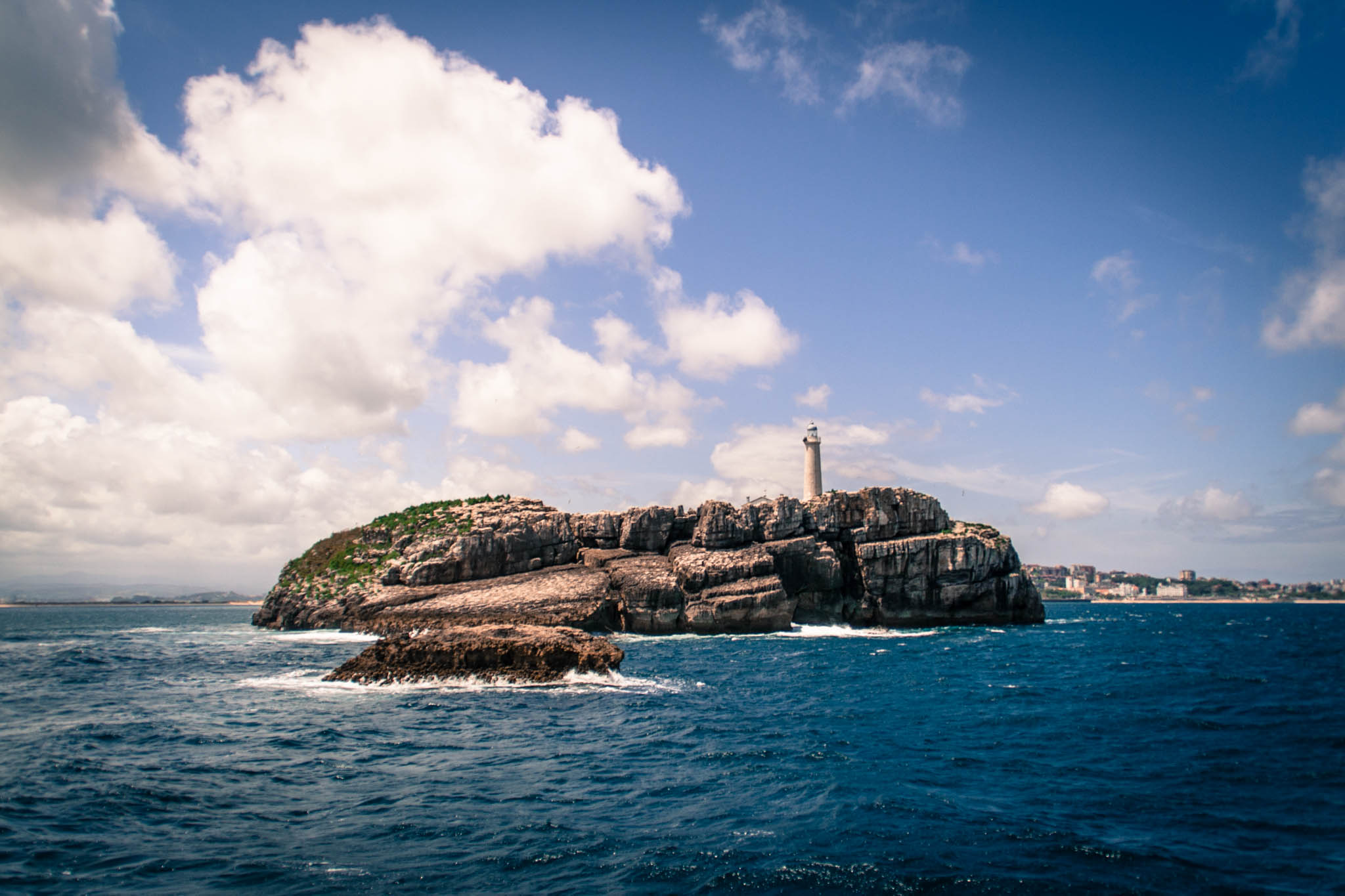
Mouro Island from the northeast, with Santander in the background and the small Corbera Islet in the foreground

The original name of the island, found in 16th-century documents, was Mogro Island. In the 18th century, a transcription error by cartographer Vicente Tofiño de San Miguel changed the name to Mouro Island.

In July 1812, during the Peninsular War, Spanish ally Great Britain captured the island from Napoleon's forces, allowing the Spanish ships to make landfall at Sardinero.

The only structure on the island is a 19th-century lighthouse, which is now automated. Until 1921, it was occupied by two lighthouse keepers, who were often isolated by storms. In 1865, one of the keepers was swept out to sea during a storm and drowned. In 1895, one of the keepers died suddenly, but due to the storm, his body was not able to be evacuated for some time. Another death was recorded when the son of a lighthouse keeper slipped when he was about to step onto the rocky island and died.

In February 2014, a spectacular photograph of a wave crashing over the lighthouse appeared in newspapers around the world, including on the cover of the International New York Times.

== Plants and wildlife ==
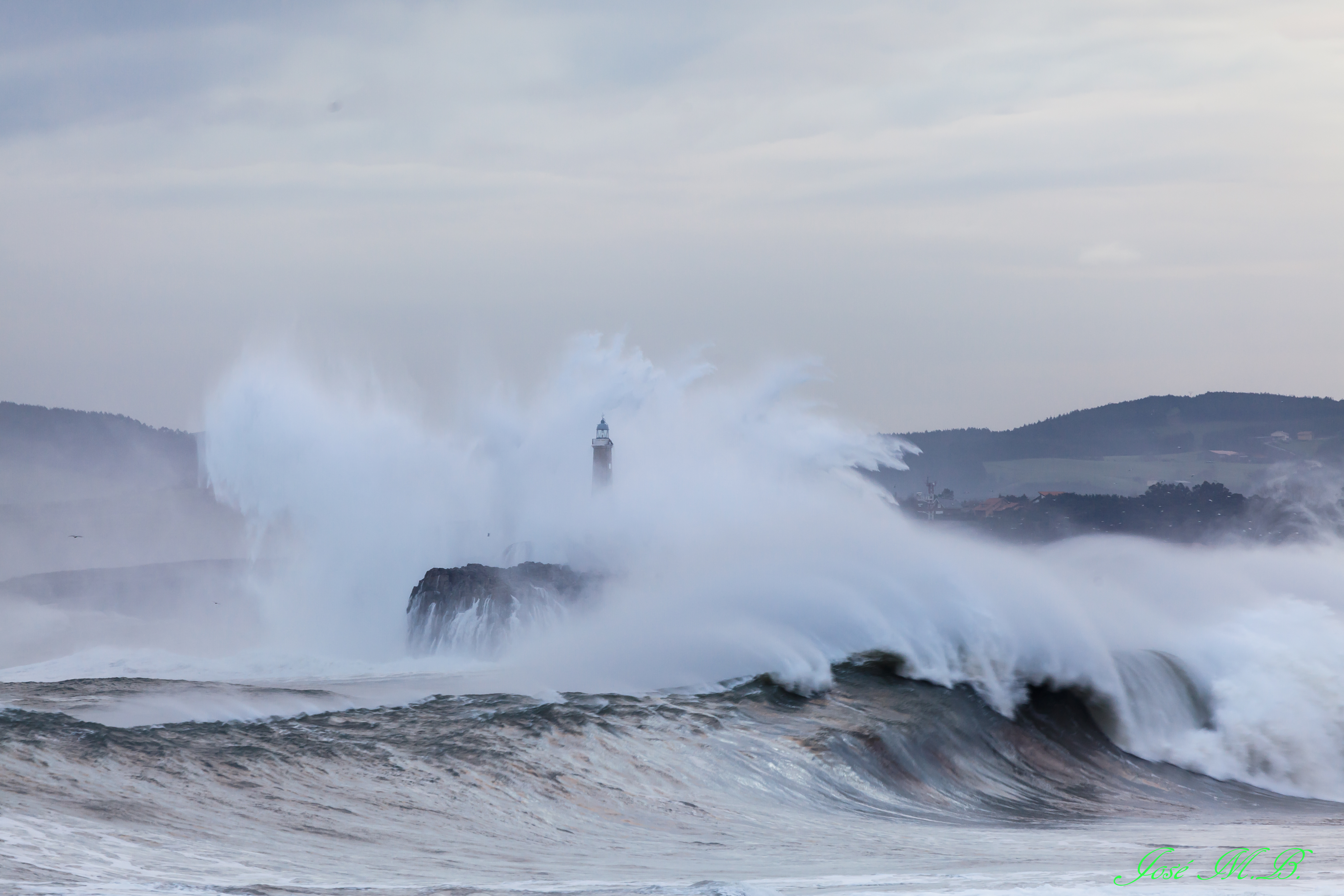
Waves crashing into Mouro Island

Mouro Island has a high biodiversity of fish and plant life in its waters, with more than 39 species of fish found nearby. It was declared a marine reserve in 1986, with a perimeter extending to 300 meters surrounding the island. Plants found on the island include heath (Erica vagans), gorse (ulex), broom (genisteae) and the eagle fern (Pteridium aquilinum). Carpobrotus edulis is also found on the island, thought to be brought there by a lighthouse keeper.

Mouro Island is an important habitat for seabirds, particularly European storm petrels and herring gulls. In 2014, Spain's Ministry of Agriculture, Food and Environment declared Mouro Island to be a Special Protection Area (SPA) to ensure the conservation of the birds that inhabit this area. It was estimated that fewer than 150 storm petrel lived in the area. It is illegal to bring cats, rats and other mammals onto the island. A smaller islet to the northwest, Islote la Corbera, is also part of the protected area.

== World Oceans Day ==
An annual swim and scuba diving event is held around Mouro Island to mark World Oceans Day each June. It features an island "hugging" event, in which surfers and kayakers completely encircle the island. The event is held to raise awareness of the importance of conserving the seas and oceans.

== Gallery ==
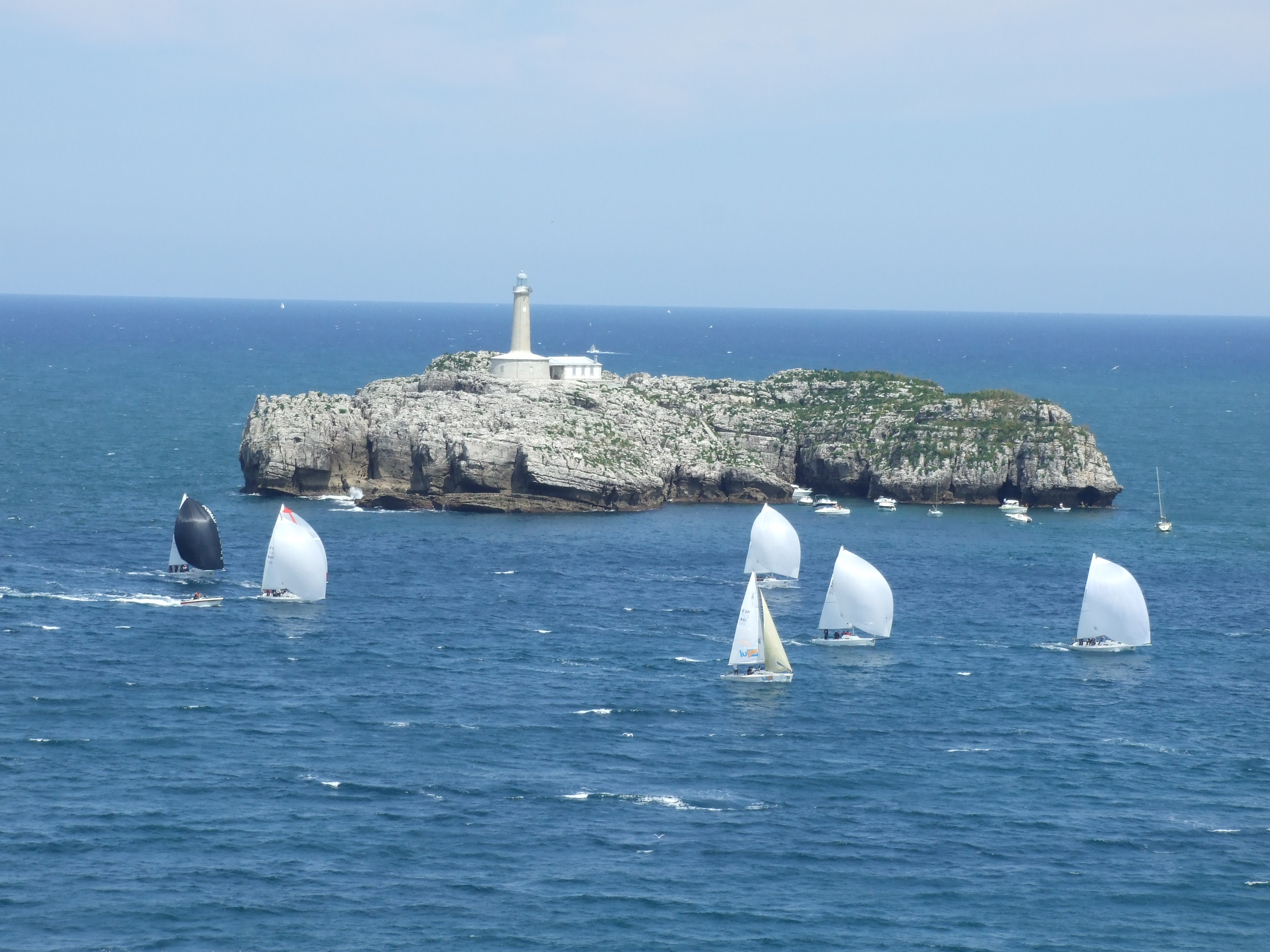
Yacht race in 2009

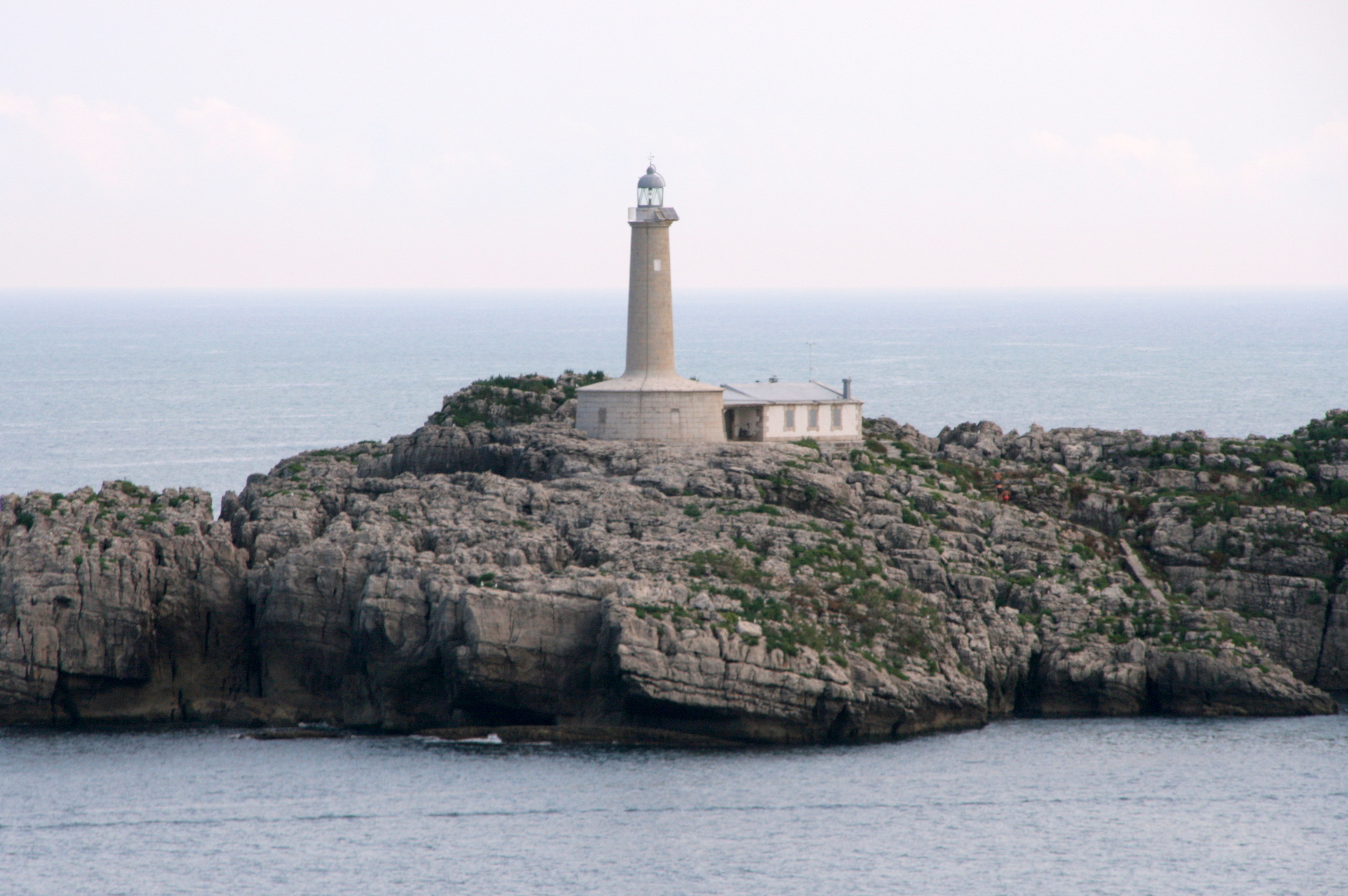
Island with lighthouse and lodgings, as seen in 2013

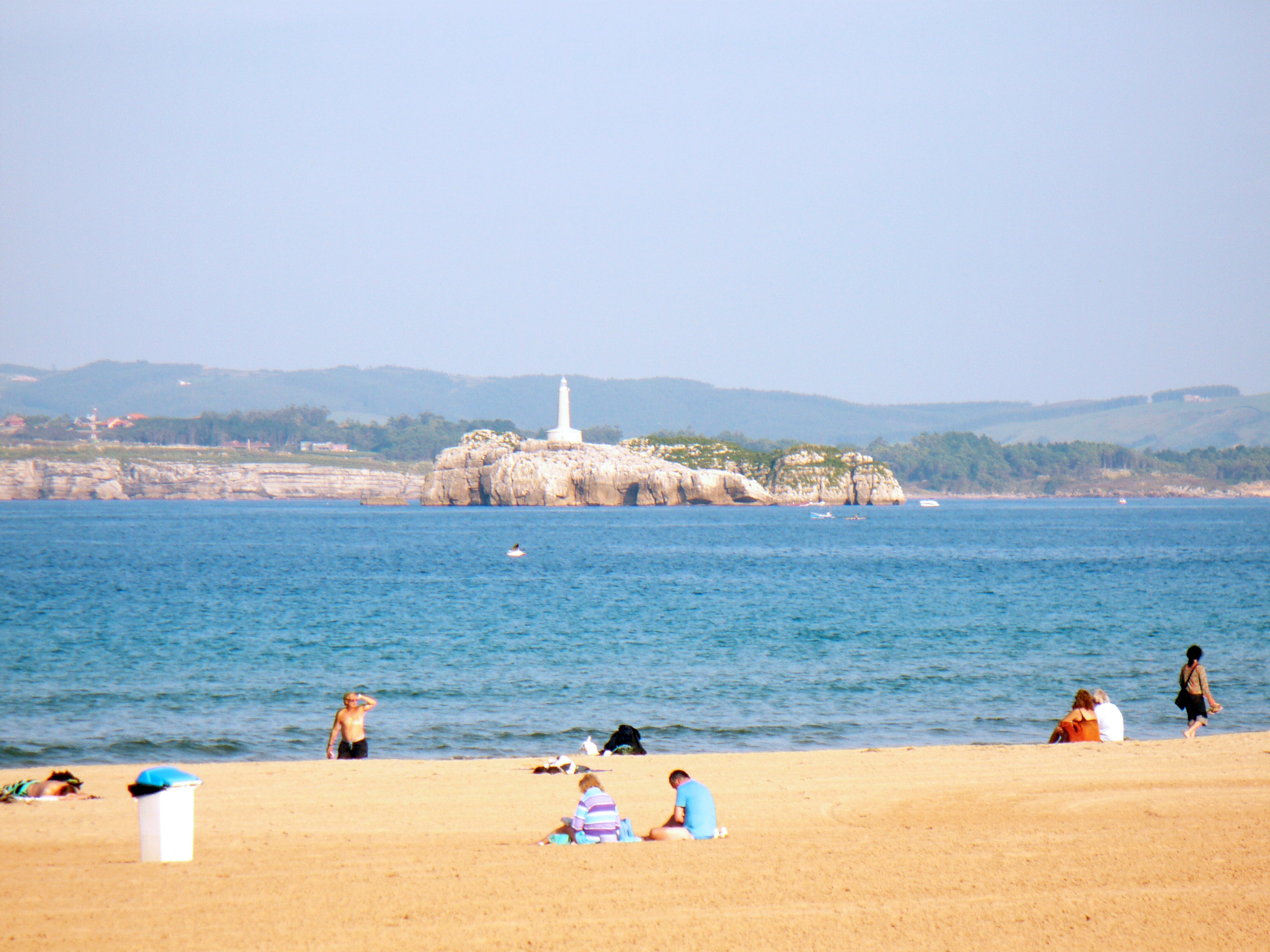
View of the island as seen from Sardinero

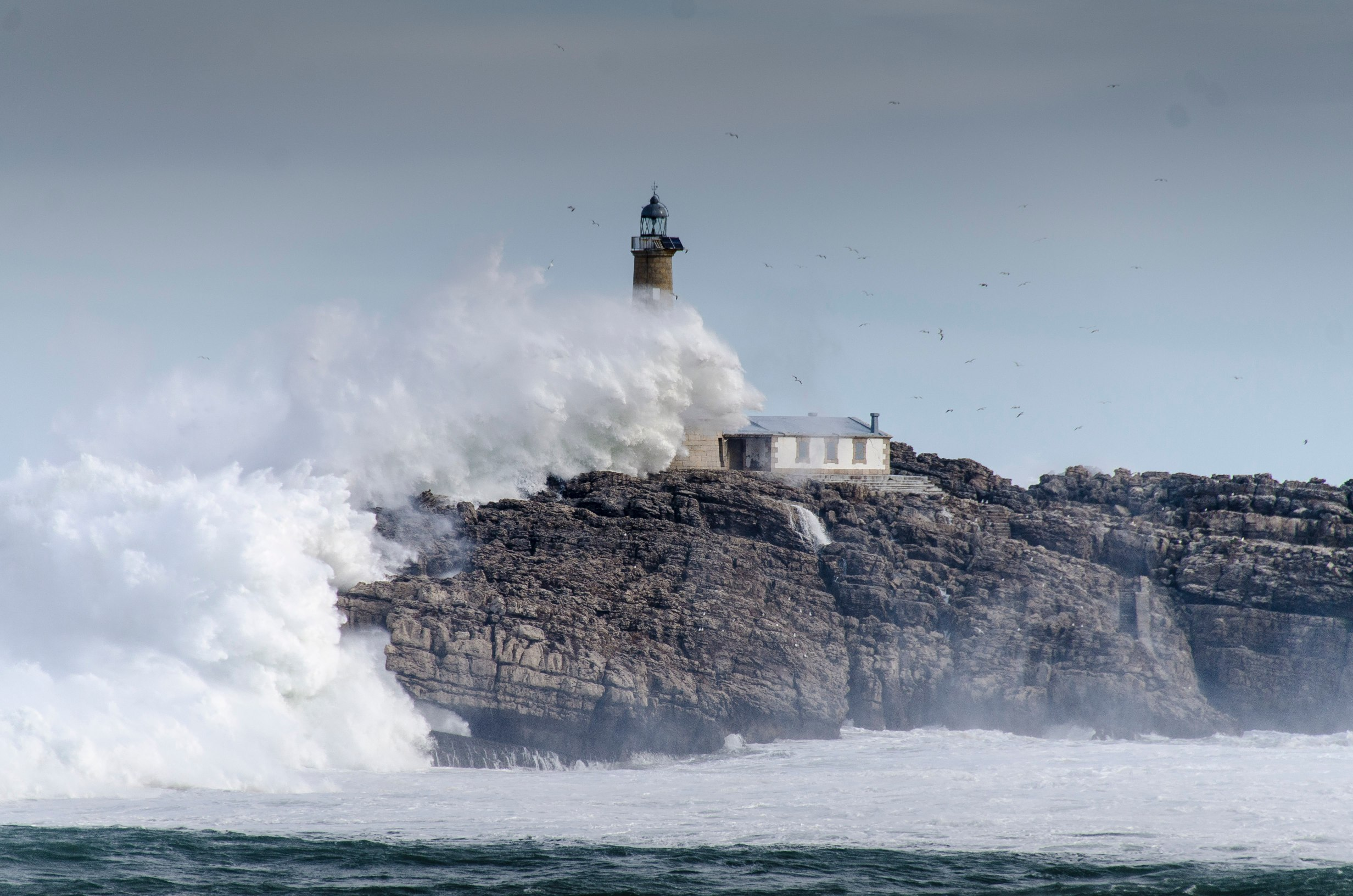
Waves crash over the lighthouse

== See also ==
- List of islands of Spain
