= Pineda Palace =

Neoclassical building of Valencia

- Palau Pineda
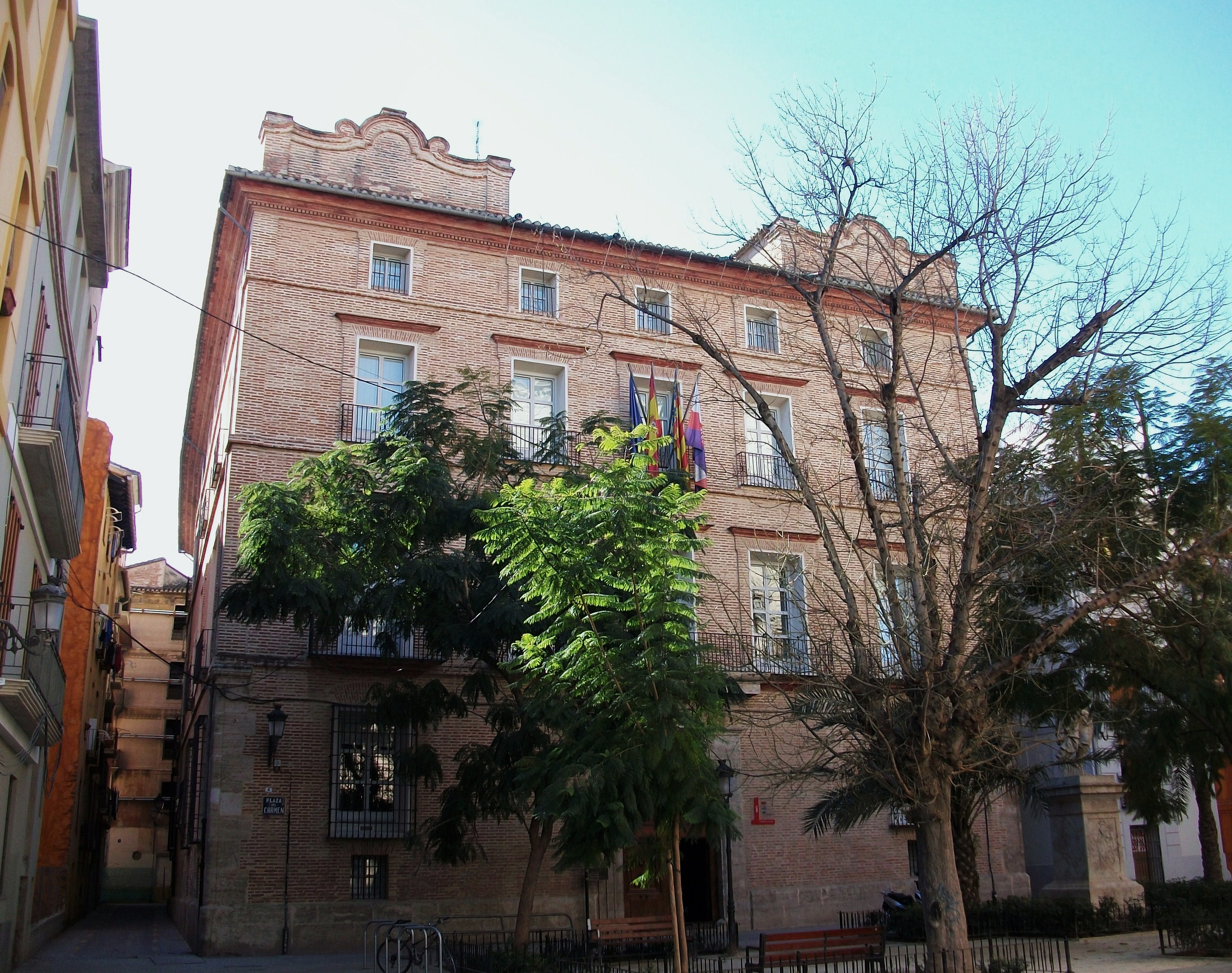
- Pineda Palace
- Interactive map of the Pineda Palace area

General information
- Architectural style: Neoclassicism
- Location: Valencia, Spain
- Coordinates: 39.478931°N 0.378714°W
- Construction started: April 7, 1728
- Completed: 1733

The Pineda Palace is a neoclassical building of Valencia, Spain.

== History ==
The palace, “Palau Pineda” or “Palau del Intendente Pineda”, was named after Francisco Salvador de Pineda, the first owner, who held the positions of Intendente General de los Reinos de Valencia y Murcia and Justicia Mayor of the city.

The palace was commissioned by the Intendent Pineda, and built from 1728 to 1733. Pineda was married with Francisca de Paula Negrete. His position was as intendent included supervision of the tax collection, allowing him to embezzle the funds to build this palace. For this excess, he was dismissed as intendent and exiled from Valencia . In 1902, the order of Marist brothers settled down in the palace. In 1918 it was bought by the “Congregación de Hermanas del Sagrado Corazón de Jesús y de los Santos Ángeles”. During these years, the Pineda Palace was a convent and a nursing home for elderly women, as well as a hostel for women who moved to Valenia for study and work.

While the Spanish Civil War, left the building undamaged, the flood of 1957 harmed the building seriously. In 1980 the Generalitat Valenciana purchased the palace and it was restored by Vicente González Móstoles and Alejandro Pons Romaní from 1990 to 1992.

== Structure and style ==
The neoclassical façade consists of two floors of balconies, built with reddish-toned brick. It is characterized by its symmetry, flanked by two small towers, and a central door with a lintel hosting the coat of arms of the Pineda. The shield is currently very damaged, although you can still distinguish the date of 1732, the supposed year of foundation of the building. It also highlights the legend written in the Filacteria of the shield, with the charge and the name of the holder. The plant of the building is approximately rectangular, whose measures are 23 x 34 meters. It consists of a hallway, mezzanine, two floors and attic. It also has a back garden, built later, which is currently the terrace of the cafeteria. The building has undergone several renovations during its history, such as changes in the walls for the adequacy of its use as a school, and as the turret attached to the rear facade. In the garden area outside the palace there is a sculpture by the painter Joan de Joanes.

== Actual use ==
At present, the Pineda Palace has classrooms and meeting rooms. They are usually used by the Generalitat Valenciana, the entities whose headquarters is Pineda Palace or another entities with formative or institutional character. In the present, Pineda Palace is the local branch of the Universidad Internacional Menéndez Pelayo and the Institut Valencià d'Administració Pública.
