= Emilio Lora-Tamayo =

Spanish physicist and academic (1950–2024)

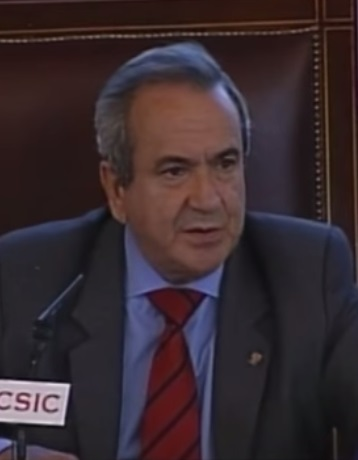
- Lora-Tamayo in 2014

President of the Spanish National Research Council
- In office 21 February 2003 – 15 May 2004
- Preceded by: Rolf Tarrach Siegel
- Succeeded by: Carlos Martínez Alonso
- In office 13 January 2012 – 17 November 2017
- Preceded by: Rafael Rodrigo Montero
- Succeeded by: Rosa Menéndez

Personal details
- Born: 5 November 1950 Madrid, Spain
- Died: 29 March 2024 (aged 73) Madrid, Spain
- Parent: Manuel Lora-Tamayo (father)

Emilio Lora-Tamayo D'Ocon (5 November 1950 – 29 March 2024) was a Spanish physicist and academic. He served as the president of the Spanish National Research Council (CSIC) twice, from 2003 to 2004 and from 2012 to 2017. He was a professor at the Autonomous University of Barcelona and served as rector for Menéndez Pelayo International University and the Universidad Camilo José Cela.

== Early life and education ==
Emilio Lora-Tamayo was born on 5 November 1950, in Madrid. He was the son of Manuel Lora-Tamayo, who served during the Francoist dictatorship as the Minister of Education from 1962 to 1968 and president of the Spanish National Research Council (CSIC) from 1967 to 1971.

Lora-Tamayo received a degree in physical sciences in 1972 and his Diplôme d'Études Approfondies from Paul Sabatier University. He received his PhD in physical sciences from the Complutense University of Madrid in 1977. He then conducted research at the École Supérieure de l'Aeronautique et de l'Espace and the Laboratoire de l'Informatique et de l'Electronique in France.

== Career ==
Prior to the completion of his doctorate, Lora-Tamayo worked at the Spanish National Research Council (CSIC), devoted in particular to microelectronics. Following the 2002 Prestige oil spill, he served as president of the Scientific Advisory Committee convened by the Spanish government. He held the post of Professor of Electronics at the Autonomous University of Barcelona, beginning in 1989. He was vice president of Scientific and Technical Research at the CSIC between 1996 and 2003. In 2003 he was appointed president of the CSIC by the government of José María Aznar and served in that role until 2004. Between 2008 and 2012 he directed the CSIC's Barcelona Microelectronics Institute of the CSIC. He was appointed president of the CSIC again by the government of Mariano Rajoy in 2012, and held the position until 2017. He was also a visiting professor at the University of California, Berkeley, in the United States.

Statements made by Lora-Tamayo in November 2014 describing the brain drain in Spain as an "exaggerated urban legend" caused unease in the Spanish scientific community due to the declining numbers of researchers in the CSIC and emigration to institutes abroad. Lora-Tamayo was also criticised for the abrupt dismissal of the director of the Estación Biológica de Doñana, Juan José Negro, ten months before the end of his mandate on 30 September 2015. Negro had been proposed by a majority of his fellow researchers. The environmental organisation WWF said it would not like the dismissal to have been "a punishment for his clear and exemplary stance in the management of Doñana on issues such as the dredging of the Guadalquivir, the reopening of the Aznalcóllar mines or the claim for funds so that the Doñana Biological Station can continue".

Lora-Tamayo was appointed rector of Menéndez Pelayo International University in November 2017. Less than a year later, the Ministry of Science, Innovation and Universities, chaired by Pedro Duque, demanded his resignation. Initially, Lora-Tamayo declined but agreed to resign after the ministry presented a motion of censure in November 2018. According to Lora-Tamayo, the government asked him to resign in order to put a woman in the post, with the secretary of state, Ángeles Heras Caballero, arguing that this was the government's political line. He was succeeded in the post by María Luz Morán Calvo-Sotelo, daughter of Fernando Morán López.

Lora-Tamayo served as rector of the Universidad Camilo José Cela from 2020 to 2023.

During his academic career, he published over 100 articles in scientific journals and presented more than 150 papers at national and international conferences. He also co-authored seven patents. He was also a member of the Real Academia San Dionisio of Jerez and of the Real Academia de Ciencias y Artes de Barcelona.

Lora-Tamayo died in Madrid on 29 March 2024, at the age of 73.

Preceded by Rafael Rodrigo Montero	President of the Spanish National Research Council; 2012–2017	Succeeded by Rosa Menéndez
Preceded by Rolf Tarrach Siegel	President of the Spanish National Research Council; 2003–2004	Succeeded by Carlos Martínez Alonso
