= Cacicedo =

Village in Camargo, Cantabria, Spain

- Village
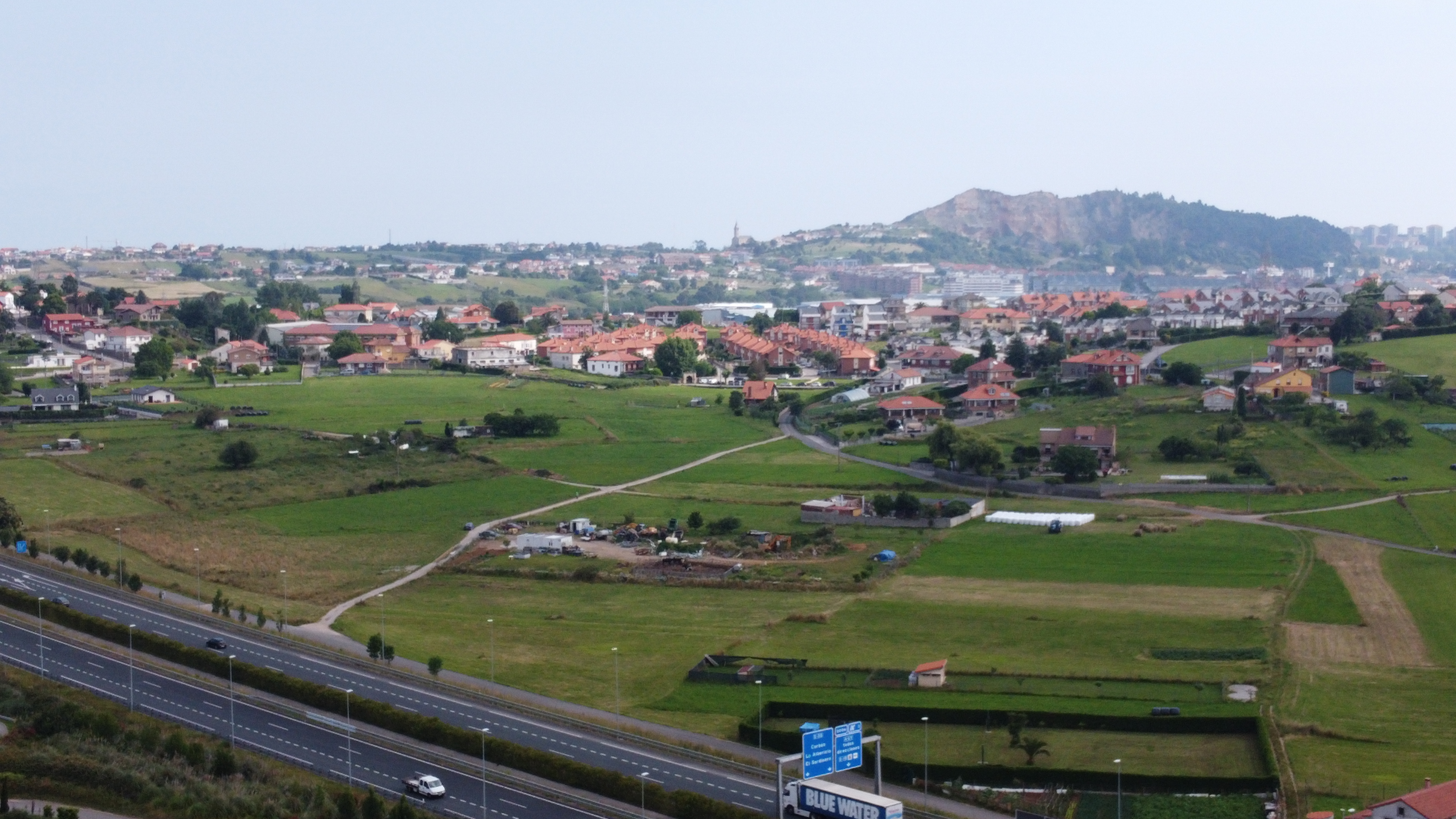

- Location within Spain
- Coordinates: 43°26′N 3°53′W
- Country: Spain
- Autonomous community: Cantabria
- Municipality: Camargo

Population (2012)
  - Total: 1,000

Cacicedo is a village of the municipality of Camargo, Cantabria, Spain. The population in the year 2012 was 1.000 inhabitants.
