= Maliaño =

- Locality
- Location in Spain
- Coordinates: 43°25′7″N 3°50′6″W
- Country: Spain
- Autonomous community: Cantabria
- Province: Cantabria
- Comarca: Bay of Santander
- Municipality: Camargo
- Judicial district: Santander

Government
  - Alcalde: Ángel Duque Herrera (2007) (ACaP)
- Elevation: 20 m (66 ft)

Population (2009)
  - Total: 9,563
- Demonym(s): Cachonero, a (unofficial)
- Time zone: UTC+1 (CET)
  - Summer (DST): UTC+2 (CEST)
- Postal code: 39600
- Website: Official website

Maliaño is a village in the municipality of Camargo (Cantabria, Spain). The town is located near the Bay of Santander, 5 km from the regional capital. It is the location of the regionally significant Santander Airport. The population in the year 2004 was 7,301 (INE) and it raised to 9,563 inhabitants in 2009. In 2012 9.657 inhabitants.

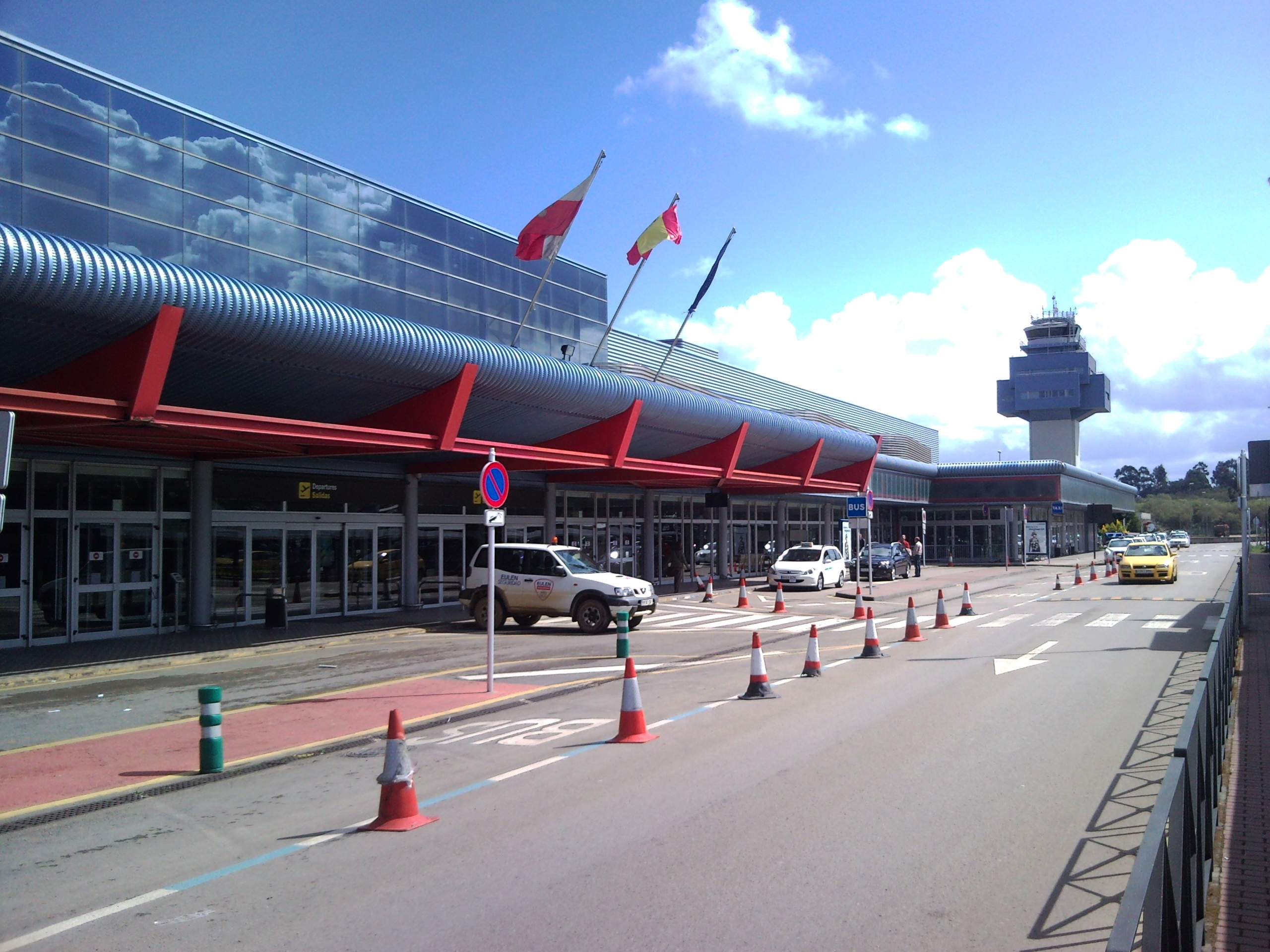
Santander Airport, in Maliaño.

Maliaño is geographically divided in two parts, the Alto Maliaño (High Maliaño) and Bajo Maliaño (Low Maliaño). Maliaño Alto is the location of the Church of San Juan Bautista, where the sepulchre of the Spanish Renaissance architect, Juan de Herrera, is located.

== Notable people ==
- Jeremy Arévalo (* 2005), footballer
- Juan Carlos Arteche (1957-2010), footballer
- Modesto Cabello Aizpeolea (1922), bolo palma player
- Mateo Escagedo Salmón (1880–1934), historian
