= Miengo =

- Municipality
- Flag

- Location of Miengo

- Location in Spain
- Coordinates: 43°25′41″N 3°59′28″W
- Country: Spain
- Autonomous community: Cantabria
- Province: Cantabria
- Comarca: Santander
- Judicial district: Torrelavega
- Capital: Miengo

Government
  - Alcalde: Avelino Cuartas Coz

Area
  - Total: 24.50 km^{2} (9.46 sq mi)
- Elevation: 11 m (36 ft)

Population (2025-01-01)
  - Total: 5,265
  - Density: 214.9/km^{2} (556.6/sq mi)
- Time zone: UTC+1 (CET)
  - Summer (DST): UTC+2 (CEST)

Miengo is a municipality in Cantabria, Spain.

== Geography ==
Miengo is situated in the central coast of Cantabria, between the Ría de San Martín de la Arena and the Ría de Mogro. Miengo has five beaches: Cuchía, Los Caballos, Usgo, Robayera and Usil; and two "calas": Las Monedas y El Huevo Frito. The natural limits of Miengo are the river Pas (east), the Ria de San Martin de la Arena (east) and the Cantabric sea (north). Miengo has border with the municipalities of Polanco, Pielagos, Liencres and Suances.

== Population ==
Miengo has 4.540 in six villages:

- Bárcena de Cudón, 302.
- Cuchía, 745.
- Cudón, 532.
- Gornazo, 136.
- Miengo (Capital), 1.329.
- Mogro, 1.396.

== Government ==
Avelino Cuartas (People's Party) is the actual mayor of Miengo, since 1995.

Municipal elections, May 25, 2003
Partie	Votes	%	Seats
PP	1115	43,75 %	6
PSOE	738	27,95 %	3
PRC	499	18,90 %	2

- Mayor elected: Avelino Cuartas (People's Party).

Municipal elections, May 27, 2007
Partie	Votes	%	Seats
PP	1328	49,52 %	6
PSOE	695	25,91 %	3
PRC	538	20,06 %	2

- Mayor elected: Avelino Cuartas (People's Party).

Municipal elections, May 22, 2011
Partie	Votes	%	Seats
PP	1344	49,83 %	6
PRC	616	22,84 %	3
PSOE	554	20,54 %	2

- Mayor elected: Avelino Cuartas (People's Party).

== Economy ==
6,1% of the population of Miengo works in agriculture, 38,5% works in industry and 55,4% works in services. The unemployment rate is 11,4%.
