= Vital Alsar =

Spanish expedition leader (1933–2020)

- Born: Vital Alsar Ramírez; August 7, 1933; Santander, Cantabria, Spain
- Died: September 15, 2020 (aged 87); Mexico City
- Occupation: Explorer
- Years active: 1966 – 2020
- Known for: Crossing the Pacific Ocean by raft
- Spouse: Dionisia Zúñiga
- Children: Denise and Marina

Vital Alsar Ramírez (August 7, 1933 – September 15, 2020) was a sailor and scientist who made several extremely long sailing expeditions. His entire life was linked to nature and the sea. He became professor of economics, although he never acted as such.

During his Military service in Morocco, Alsar read a book about the Kon-Tiki, the expedition that Thor Heyerdahl conducted in a balsa raft on the Pacific. Reading this account led to his interest in duplicating the feat, to sailing 3,770 nautical miles (6,980 km; 4,340 mi). After his military service, he lived in France, Stuttgart, Hamburg, and Canada. It was in Canada where he met Marc Modena, who became his traveling companion.

== Expeditions ==
=== Ecuador to Australia by raft ===
Between 1966 and 1973, Alsar led three expeditions by raft across the Pacific Ocean, from Ecuador and Australia. The first expedition failed, but the second and third succeeded, both setting the record for the longest known raft voyages in history—8,600 miles (13,800 km) and 9,000 miles (14,000 km). The first took place in 1966, using a simple raft, La Pacífica. The voyage was cut short by damage caused by teredo worms in the wood of his raft, which sank after 143 days—Alsar being rescued by a German ship. A second attempt in 1970 on a new raft, La Balsa, was successful, and reached Mooloolaba after 161 days and 8,565 miles (13,784 km). A third voyage in 1972 featured three rafts. They reached the coast of Ballina, Australia after 179 days at sea (one of the three foundering in Australian waters).

=== Mexico-Spain-Mexico, Mar, hombre y paz ===
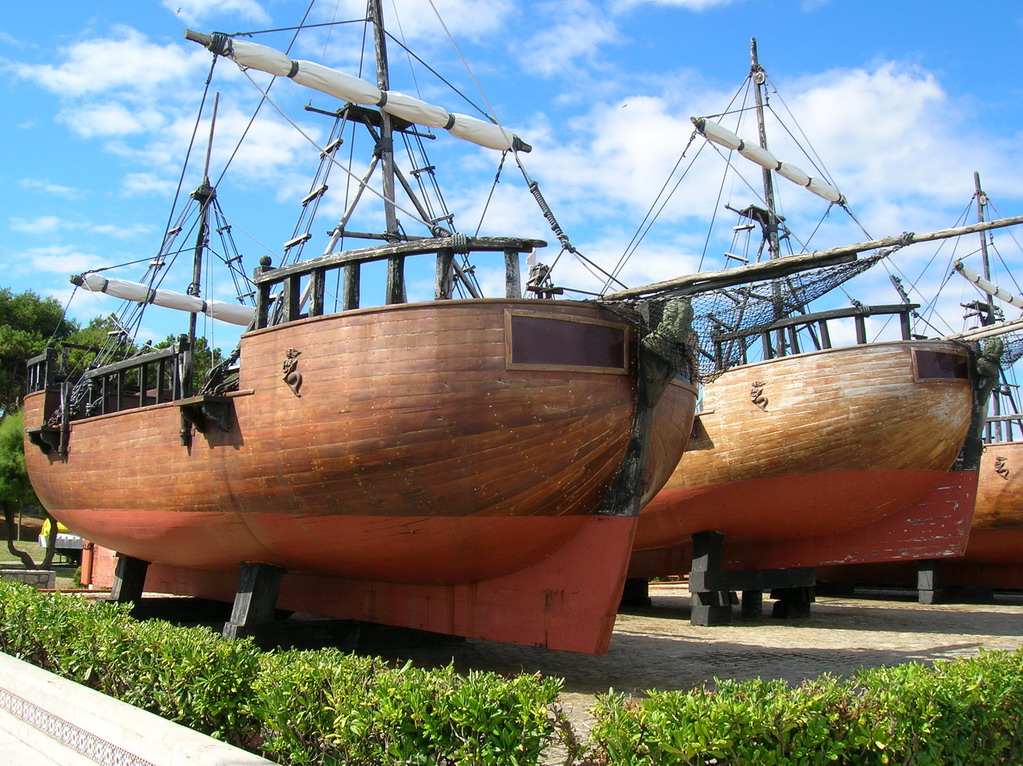
Galleons used by Vital Alsar in Magdalena Peninsula, in Santander.

Vital later replaced the rafts with galleons to carry out the project "Mar, hombre y paz", which was begun in 1980. This expedition took the trapo blanco (white rag), around the world on board the La Marigalante.

=== Last expedition: Mexico-Greece-Mexico, El Niño, La Mar y La Paz ===
Alsar resided in Veracruz, Mexico, and spent his time with his grandchildren and profiling a new project aiming to unite all of the marine world. The project was called El Niño, La Mar y La Paz ("The Boy, the Sea and the Peace"), and consisted of carrying a child and thirteen crew aboard a trimaran named Itzamna (the Mayan god of knowledge), later named Zamná. It set sail in 2009 from the Mexican island Cozumel, making port in a number of countries

== Awards ==
He has received numerous awards for his career, most notably from the Spanish Geographical Society, or the Adena International, of the Society for the Protection of Nature. The latter is represented by a "Golden Dolphin" by Salvador Dalí, which he shared with Philippe Cousteau.
