= Universidad Camilo José Cela =

University in Spain

Camilo José Cela University
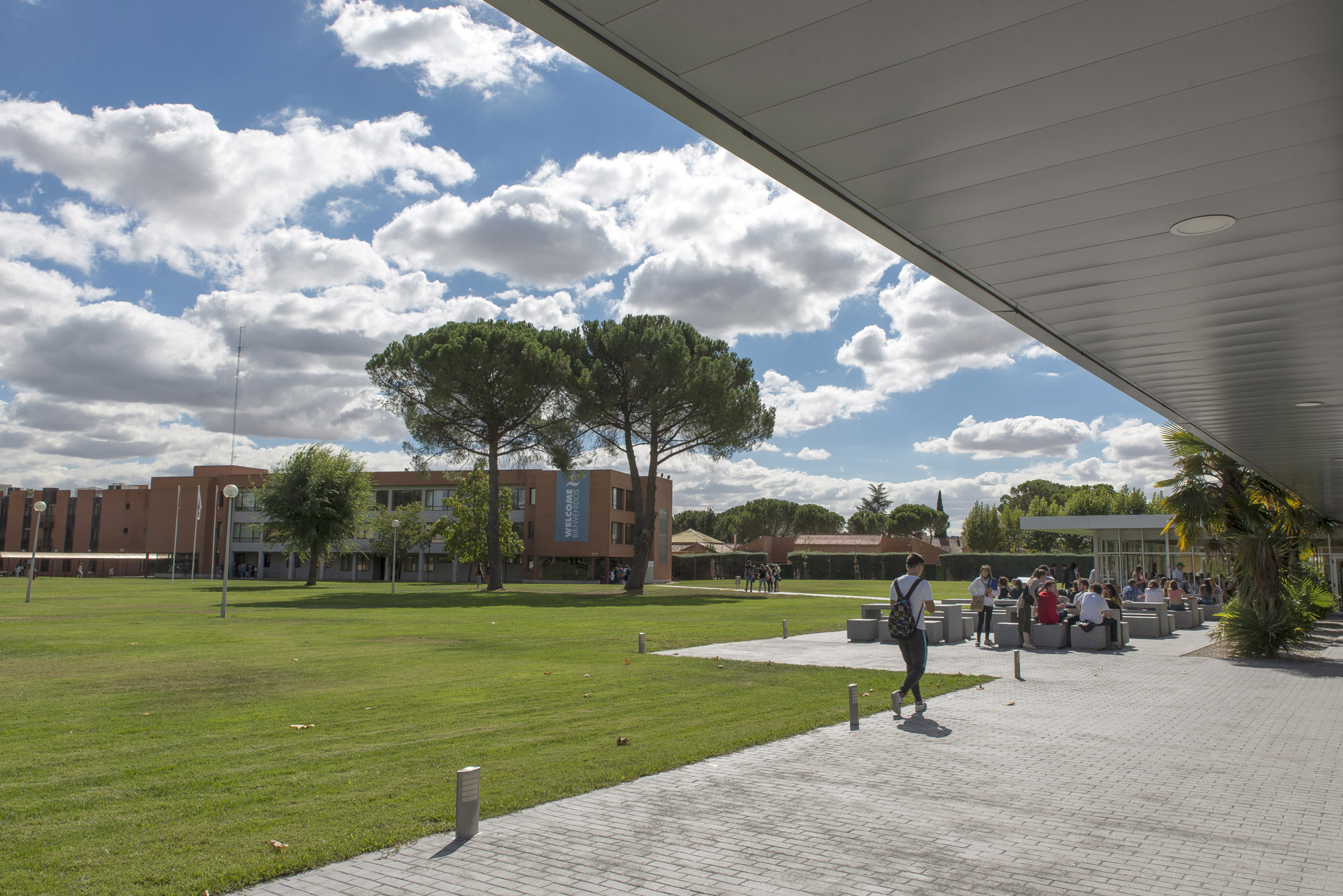
- Type: Private
- Established: 2000
- President: Nieves Segovia Bonet
- Rector: Emilio Lora-Tamayo (2020–2023)
- Students: 3,500
- Location: C/Castillo de Alarcón, 49, Urb. Villafranca del Castillo; 28692 Villanueva de la Cañada, Madrid and C/Almagro, 5, 28013, Madrid, Spain
- Campus: Madrid-Villafranca and Madrid-Almagro
- Nickname: UCJC
- Website: http://www.ucjc.edu

The University Camilo José Cela (UCJC) is a private university established in 2000 and based in Madrid, Spain.

Its main campus, located in Madrid-Villafranca, includes undergraduate studies (bachelor's degrees) in five integrated faculties (Communication, Education, Health, Law-Management and Architecture-Technology). The city campus, Madrid-Almagro, is located in downtown Madrid and is the headquarters for the UCJC Graduate School. Dr Pedro Sánchez, the Prime Minister of Spain, earned his PhD from UCJC.

== Historical reference: Camilo José Cela ==
The university is named after Nobel Literature Prize winner Camilo José Cela who laid the university’s first stone, together with Felipe Segovia Olmo, then President and founder of the educational institution Institución Educativa SEK, of which this university is a part.

== Main campus: Madrid-Villafranca ==
An extension of land of 100,000 m2, the Madrid-Villafranca campus includes several buildings: Presidency, Rectorate, Faculties, Student Center, Lecture Halls (2), the Library and Study Halls, MediaLab, two student residences and restaurant “El Tobogán”, besides the UCJC Sports Club facilities.

The library contains approximately 30,000 books, as well as other collections in different formats such as CD-ROM, DVD, video, microfiche and 278 periodical publications.

== Urban campus (Almagro): Graduate School ==
The palace constructed in 1920 by architect Gustavo Fernández Balbuena located on 5 Almagro St., Madrid, is, as of academic year 2016-2017, the urban campus of the Camilo José Cela University. The building covers 3,500 square meters.

== Photos ==
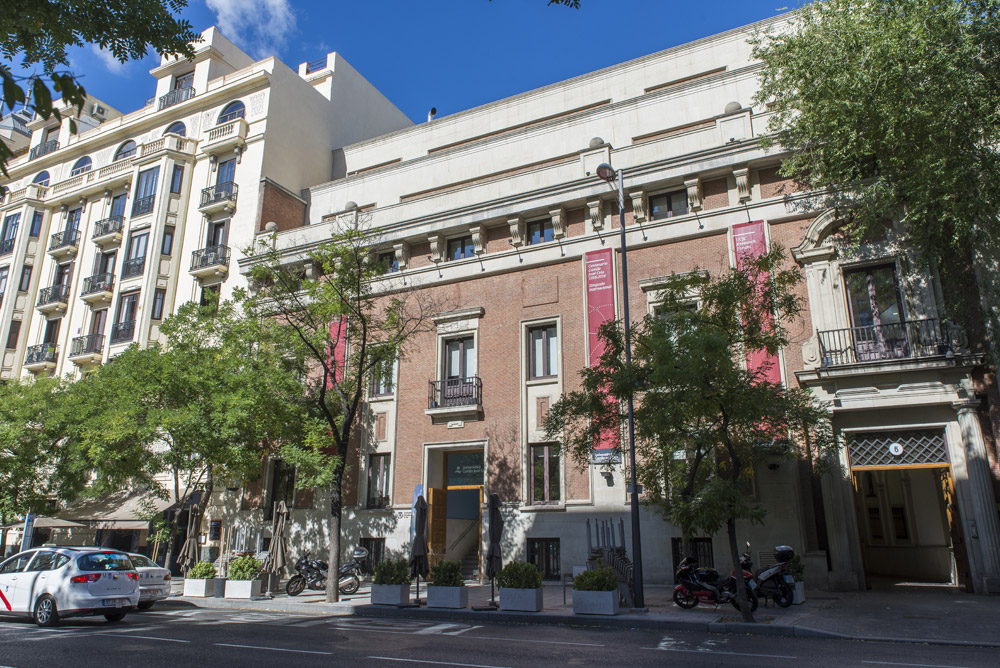
Campus Madrid-Almagro, Main Building
