= Puente San Miguel =

Coordinates: 43°21′35″N 4°05′13″W

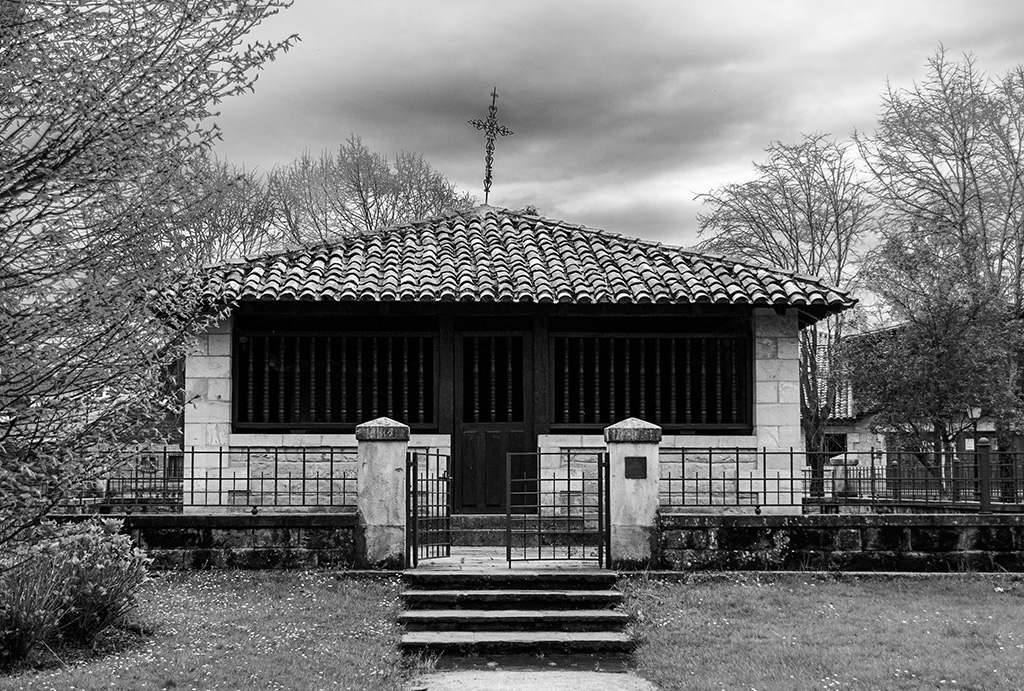

Puente San Miguel (Spain) (formerly known as Bárcena la Puente), is the capital of the municipality of Reocín in Cantabria, Spain, and its most important population center.

It is located 55 kilometers from Santander and is 41 meters (ASL). It is connected to Santander by the Feve company railway.

== Notable people ==
- Birthplace of golfer, Celia Barquín Arozamena (1996–2018).
- Birthplace of rally driver, Dani Sordo (born 1983)

== See also ==
- Casa de juntas de Puente San Miguel
