= Camargo, Spain =

Camargo
- Municipality
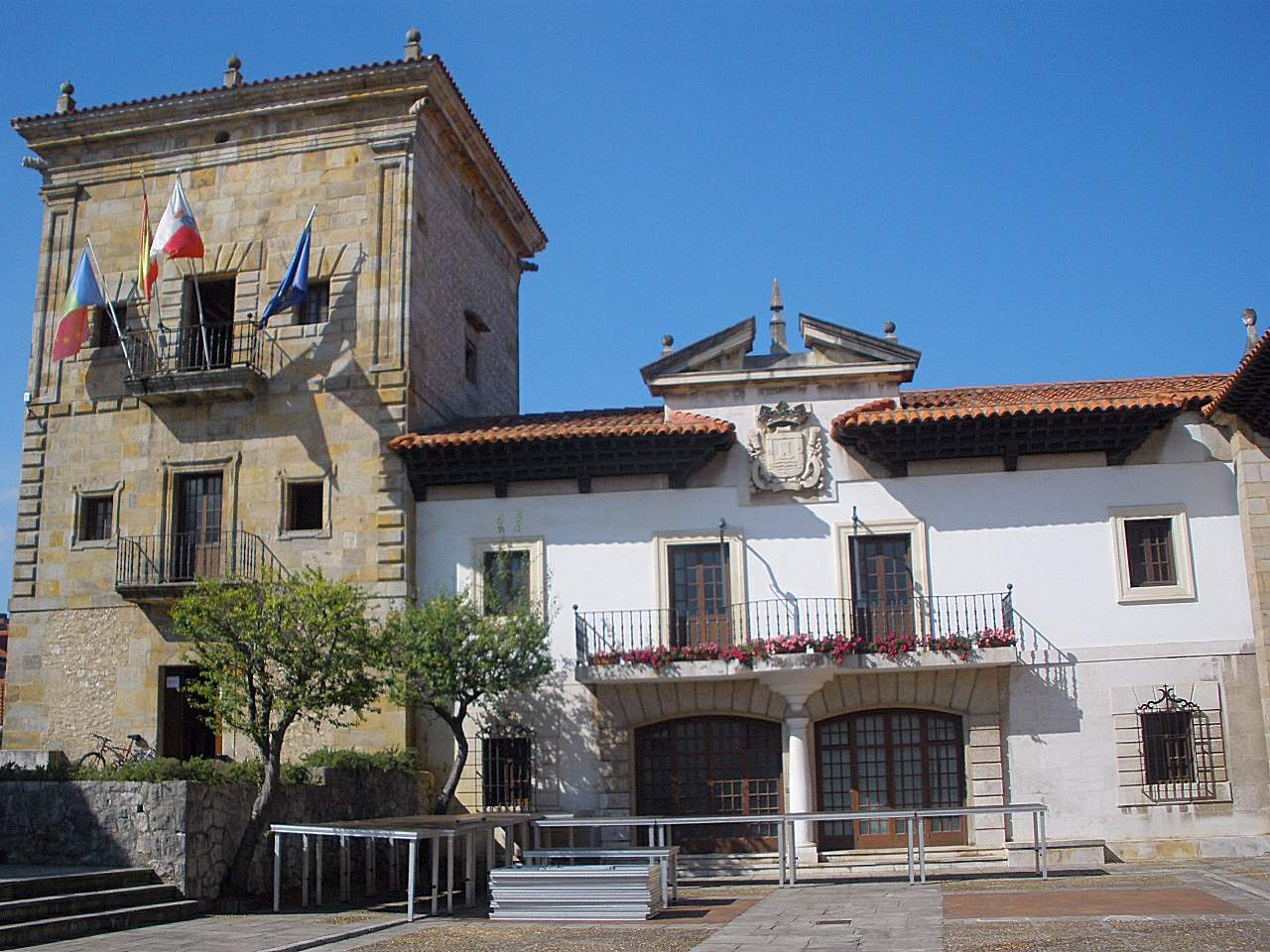

- Flag Coat of arms

- Location of Camargo

- Location within Cantabria Camargo (Spain)
- Coordinates: 43°25′36″N 3°51′19″W
- Country: Spain
- Autonomous community: Cantabria
- Province: Cantabria
- Comarca: Bay of Santander
- Judicial district: Santander
- Capital: Muriedas

Government
  - Alcaldesa: Diego Movellán

Area
  - Total: 36.58 km^{2} (14.12 sq mi)
- Elevation: 35 m (115 ft)

Population (2025-01-01)
  - Total: 30,577
  - Density: 835.9/km^{2} (2,165/sq mi)
- Demonym(s): Camargués, esa
- Time zone: UTC+1 (CET)
  - Summer (DST): UTC+2 (CEST)
- Website: Official website

Camargo (Camargu, in Cantabrian) is a municipality in the province and autonomous community of Cantabria, northern Spain. Its capital is Muriedas.

== Towns ==
- Cacicedo.
- Camargo.
- Escobedo.
- Herrera.
- Igollo.
- Maliaño.
- Muriedas (capital).
- Revilla.
