= Villaescusa de Roa =

Coordinates: 41°44′N 4°01′W

- municipality
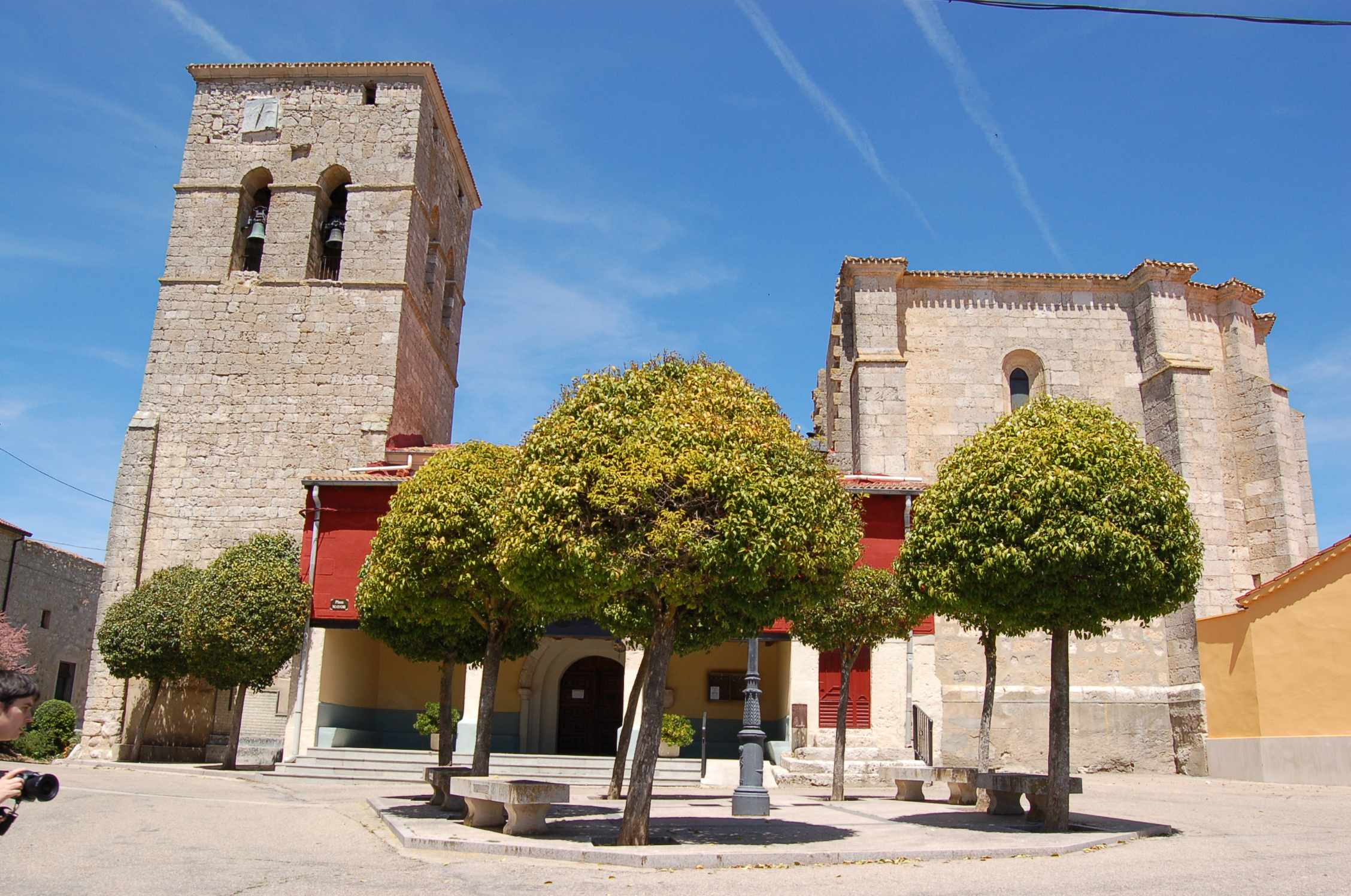
- Church of Villaescusa de Roa

- Coat of arms
- Interactive map of Villaescusa de Roa
- Country: Spain
- Autonomous community: Castile and León
- Province: Burgos

Area
  - Total: 17 km^{2} (6.6 sq mi)

Population (2025-01-01)
  - Total: 95
  - Density: 5.6/km^{2} (14/sq mi)
- Time zone: UTC+1 (CET)
  - Summer (DST): UTC+2 (CEST)

Villaescusa de Roa is a municipality located in the province of Burgos, Castile and León, Spain. According to the 2004 census (INE), the municipality has a population of 169 inhabitants.
