= Menéndez Pelayo International University =

Public university with administrative headquarters in Madrid

Coordinates: 43°28′22″N 3°47′43″W

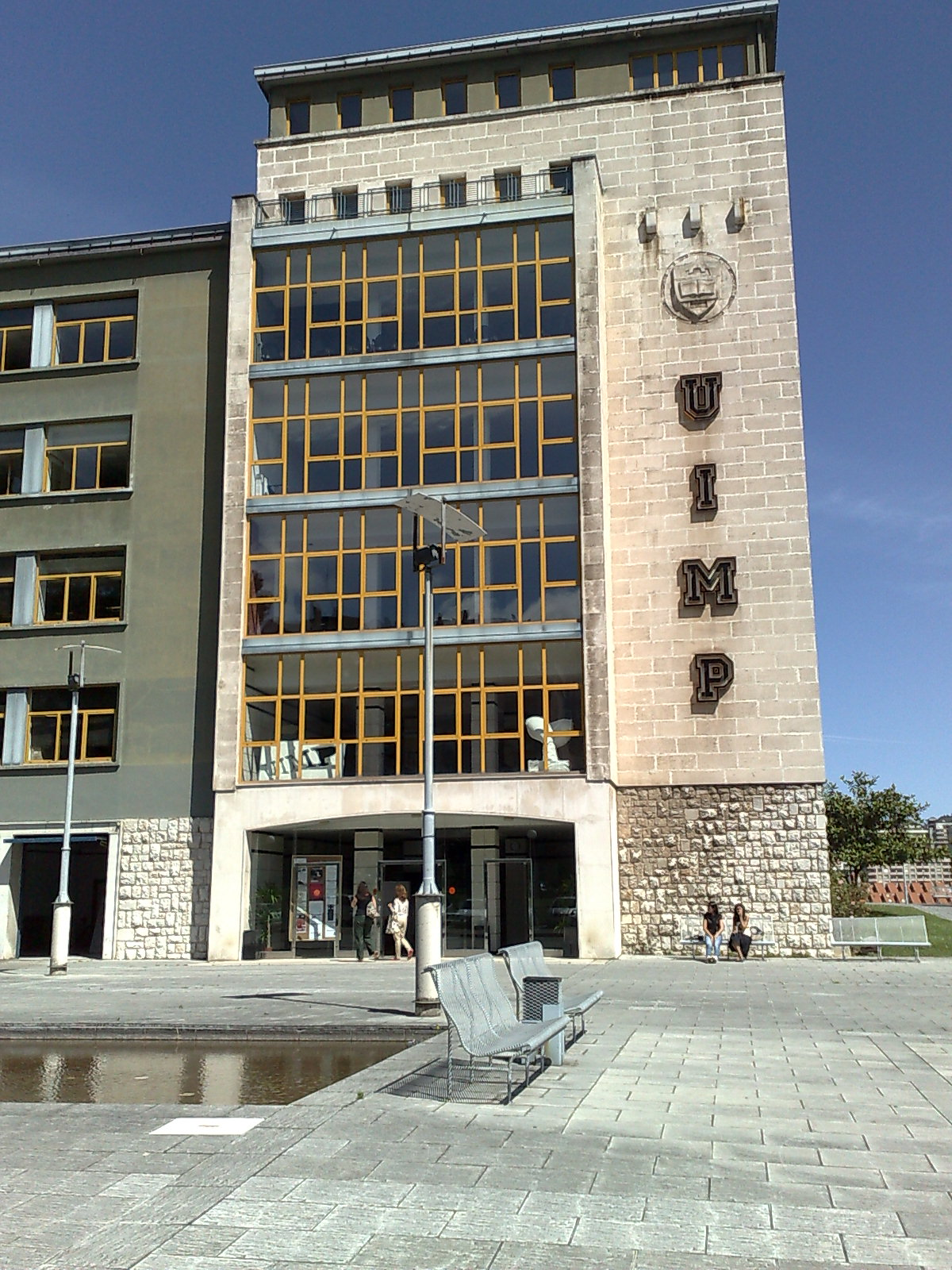
- Administration building at the original Santander campus
- Motto: Sapere aude
- Motto in English: "Dare to be wise"
- Type: Public University
- Established: 1932 (as the International Summer University of Santander); 1949 (became the Menéndez Pelayo International University)
- Rector: Ángel Pelayo González-Torre
- Website: http://www.uimp.es

Menéndez Pelayo International University ("UIMP" in Spanish) is a public university with administrative headquarters in Madrid and campuses in Santander, Valencia, Barcelona, Cartagena, Cuenca, Granada, La Línea de la Concepción, Seville and Tenerife. The University also conducts classes at the Luis Seoane Foundation in A Coruña and the Huesca campus of the University of Zaragoza.

UIMP is an "Autonomous agency" within the Ministry of Universities which, according to its bylaws, is defined as an "academic center for high culture" It was named in honor of Marcelino Menéndez y Pelayo and is the primary institution in Spain for teaching the Spanish language and culture to foreign students.

UIMP offers Master's degrees in many areas of study, including: "Translation and New Technologies: Translation of Software and Multimedia Products" (in collaboration with Amergin (The University Institute of Research in Irish Studies, University of A Coruña) and Istrad (Instituto Superior de Estudios Lingüísticos and Translation based in Seville). "Teaching Spanish as a Foreign Language" (in conjunction with the Cervantes Institute); "Renewable Energy", including fuel cells and hydrogen (in collaboration with the Spanish National Research Council); a graduate degree in "Economics and Finance", under the auspices of CEMFI; and "Contemporary History", with the participation of several other public universities.

== History ==
=== Founding and early years ===
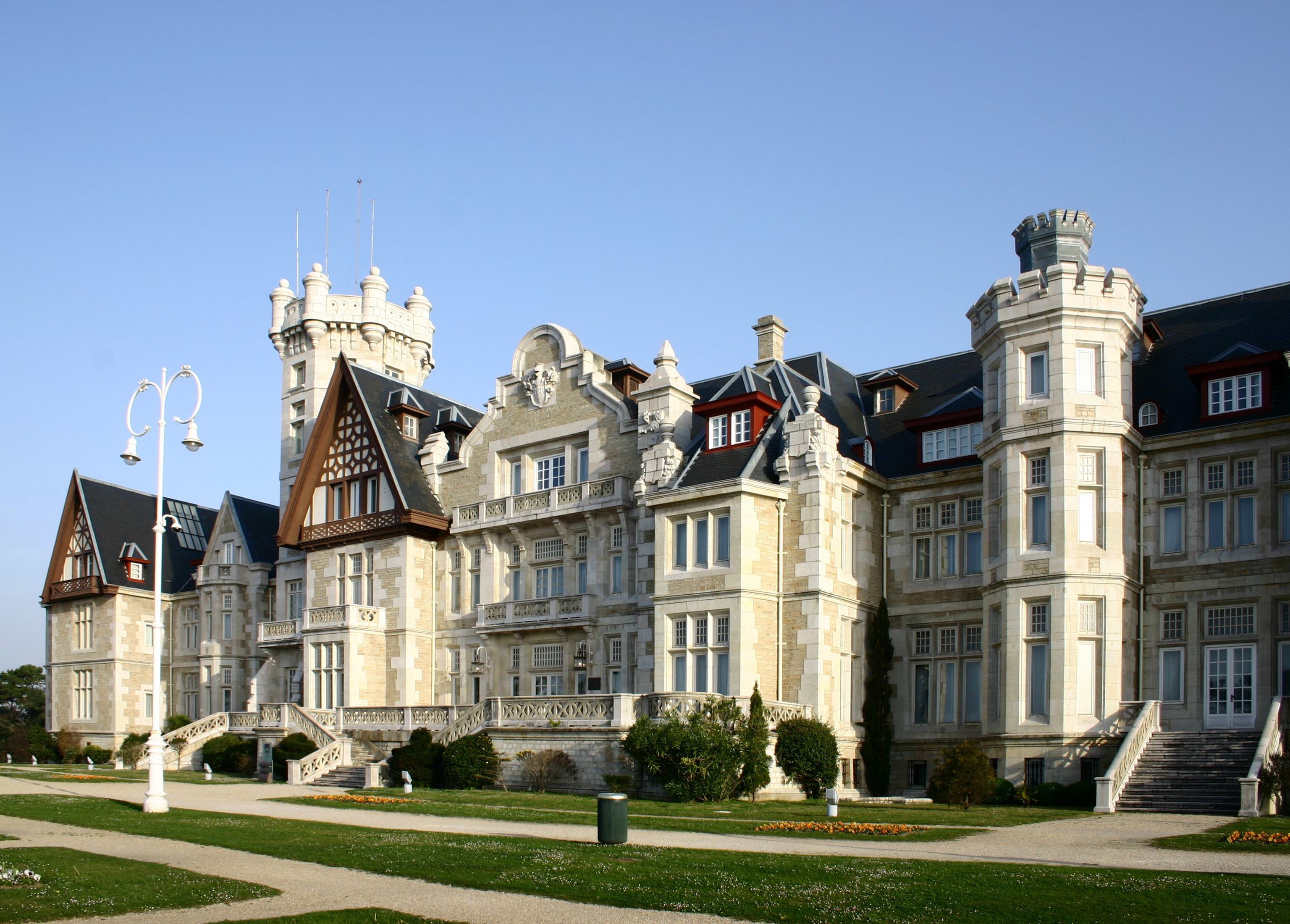
The Palacio de la Magdalena.

Menéndez Pelayo International University was created in 1932 by decree of the Second Spanish Republic, following a proposal by the Minister of Public Instruction, Fernando de los Ríos, under the name "International Summer University of Santander".

Its headquarters were established at the Palacio de la Magdalena, which had been a summer residence for King Alfonso XIII from 1913 to 1930. The palace had originally been donated to the king by the Santander City Council. It first Rectors were the historian and philologist Ramón Menéndez Pidal and the eminent physicist Blas Cabrera Felipe. The same decree named poet and professor Pedro Salinas as Secretary General to recognize his role in providing inspiration for the new University.

During the summers from 1933 to 1936, many courses were developed, with an emphasis on Spanish language and literature. These courses were designed for foreigners who, since 1926, had been receiving instruction at the Menéndez Pelayo Society; and for postgraduates of the Medical Institute whose classes had formerly been located at the Marqués de Valdecilla University Hospital.

=== Post-war re-establishment ===
These activities were interrupted by the Spanish Civil War and were not resumed until 1945, following the approval of an order that created the Menéndez Pelayo International University with headquarters in the Hospital of San Rafael in Santander. At the beginning of summer in 1949, the University returned to its former home in the Palacio de la Magdalena, courtesy of a grant from Don Juan de Borbón. Soon, given the increase in activity at the University, it became necessary to establish a campus at the Parque Atlántico de Las Llamas, also in Santander, with residential units as well as classrooms.

=== Years of growth ===
Since 1983, UIMP has extended its activities to seven other cities and has introduced shorter (often self-contained) courses. Its stated objective is to satisfy two requirements that are equally desirable and indispensable to the formation of modern culture: attention to the universal human needs that must present themselves to every sensitive mind; and the skill to clarify carefully defined technical problems in a way that represents a positive advance in each discipline.

Every year, the University has expanded it courses to reflect new developments in the social sciences and humanities, as well as technology, and has extended its cultural activities to include music, theater, poetry and the cinema.

In 2008, UIMP developed agreements with other institutions (such as the Regional Department of Immigration of the Generalitat Valenciana and the EOI Business School) to collaborate in the creation of a master's degree in the "Organization and Management of Industrial Technology". The following year, UIMP joined with the University of Cantabria in the Cantabria International Campus (CCI), which the Ministry of Education and Science declared to be a regional "Campus of International Excellence".

== Rectors ==
- Ramón Menéndez Pidal: 1933–1934.
- Blas Cabrera Felipe: 1934–1936.
- Ciriaco Pérez Bustamante: 1947–1968.
- Florentino Pérez Embid: 1968–1974.
- Francisco Ynduráin: 1974–1980.
- Raúl Morodo: 1980–1983.
- Santiago Roldán: 1983–1989.
- Ernest Lluch: 1989–1995.
- José Luis García Delgado: 1995–2005.
- Luciano Parejo: 2005–2006.
- Salvador Ordóñez: 2006–2013.
- César Nombela: 2013–2018.
- Emilio Lora-Tamayo: 2018–2019.
- Luz Morán: 2019–2021.
- Carlos Andradas: 2021–2026.
- Ángel Pelayo González-Torre: 2026–present.

== The Menéndez Pelayo International Prize ==
Since 1987, UIMP has sponsored and presented the Menéndez Pelayo International Prize, established under the patronage of Eulalio Ferrer (1921-2009), a Spanish-Mexican entrepreneur. The award is given to honor those in the literary or scientific communities whose work has humanistic value, in the tradition of the University's namesake, Marcelino Menéndez y Pelayo. Citizens of any Spanish or Portuguese speaking country are eligible.
