= Gran Casino del Sardinero =

Casino in Santander, Spain

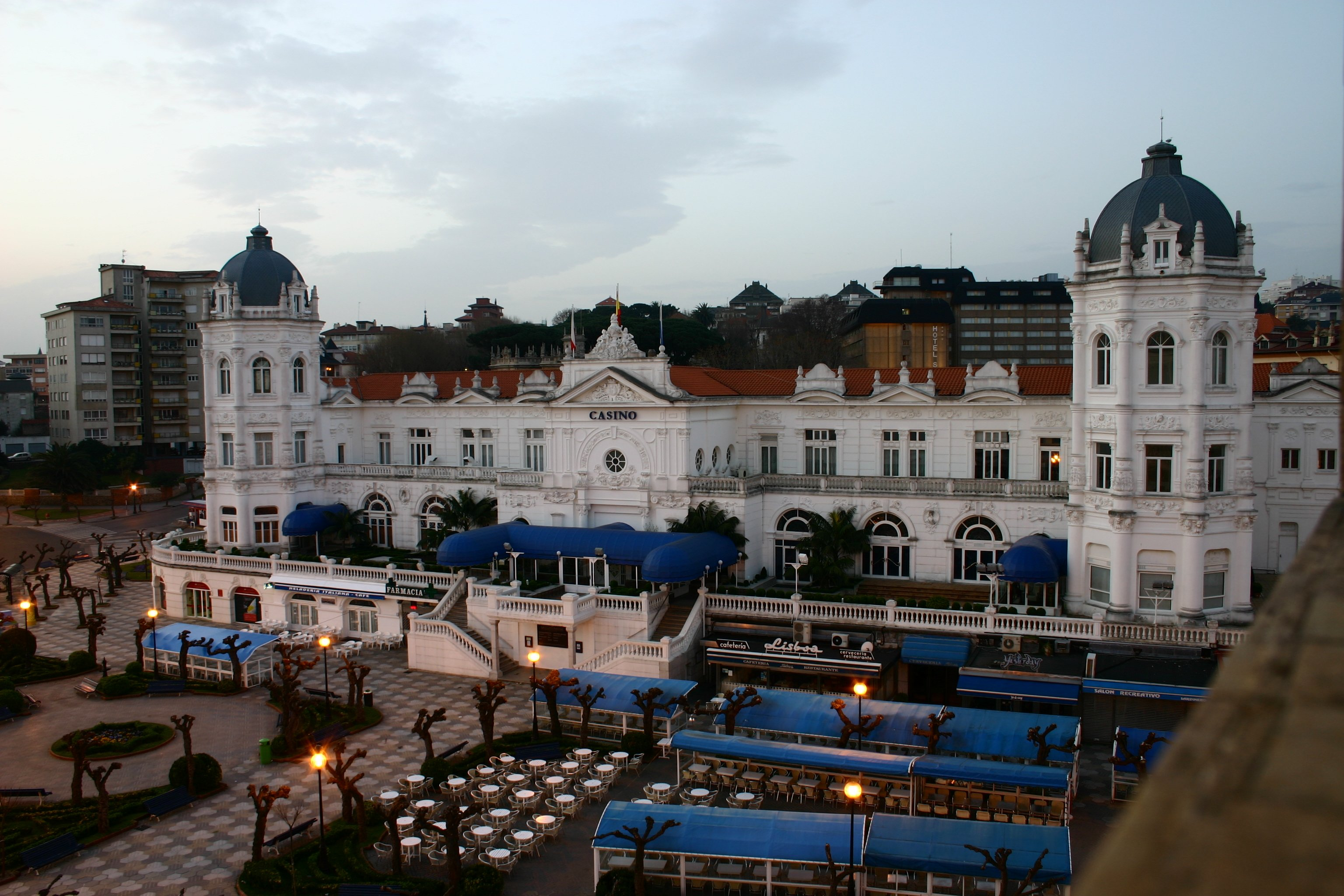
- Gran Casino del Sardinero, located in Plaza de Italia in El Sardinero.
- Interactive map of Gran Casino del Sardinero
- Location: Santander, Cantabria, Spain; 43°28′18″N 3°46′58″W
- Opened: 1916
- Architect: Eloy Martínez del Valle
- Website: Official website

The Gran Casino del Sardinero is a leading gambling casino in the city of Santander in the autonomous community of Cantabria (Spain). It is in the Plaza de Italia in El Sardinero.

== History ==
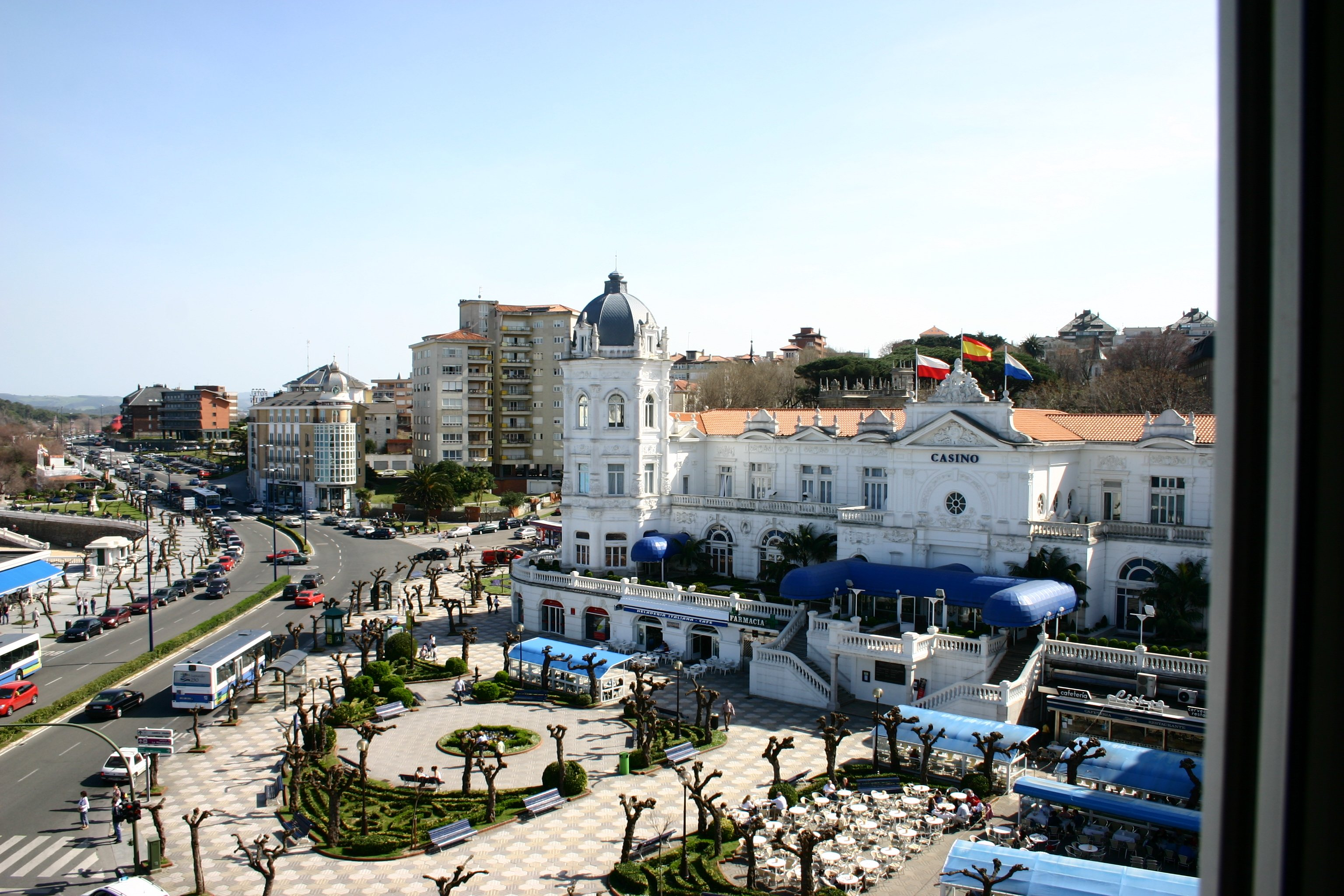
The Plaza de Italia and the casino, as seen from the Hotel Sardinero.

There had been a casino very popular with royalty in this location, but it was demolished after a fire in the 1890s and the present building erected. It opened in 1916 and was designed by architect Eloy Martínez del Valle.

Since it opened, the casino has combined roulette and baccarat with dancing and the staging of plays, musicals, and operas. Not because it stopped being the focal point of summer fun, a situation which, however, took a remarkable turn during the post-war period. The almost complete closure of their premises, except the theater, which was assigned to art cinema and testing, continued until December 1, 1978, when it was reopened as a gambling casino after the restoration carried out by the architect Ricardo Lorenzo, who kept the neoclassical style with modernist touches.

As of 2011, it has a game room and a room of slot machines, a restaurant, three dining rooms, two bars installed in each of the gaming rooms, a café, and a party room. It also has a showroom, which usually contains works of art by various artists. The games played in the game room are roulette (single 0), blackjack, poker without discarding, and slot machines and electronic roulette in the machines room. Currently, the Texas holdem tournament mode has been incorporated.

The Gran Casino sponsors and organizes various cultural and sporting events (Festival Internacional de Santander), photographic contests, sculpture and painting exhibitions, bowling, football, rowing, and other activities.
