= Bay of Santander =

Coordinates: 43°28′N 3°48′W

- Comarca and metropolitan area
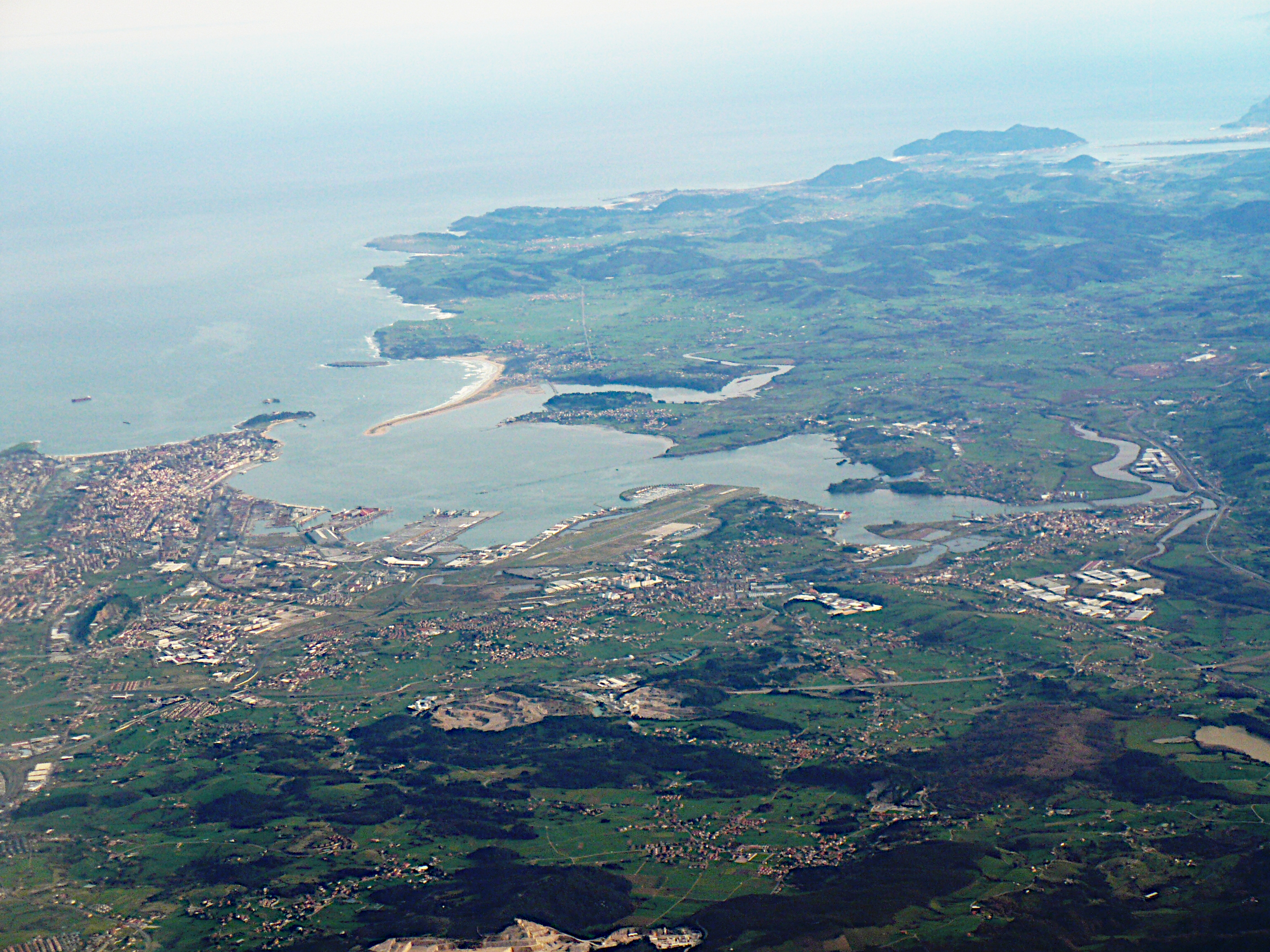
- Bay of Santander
- Flag Coat of arms
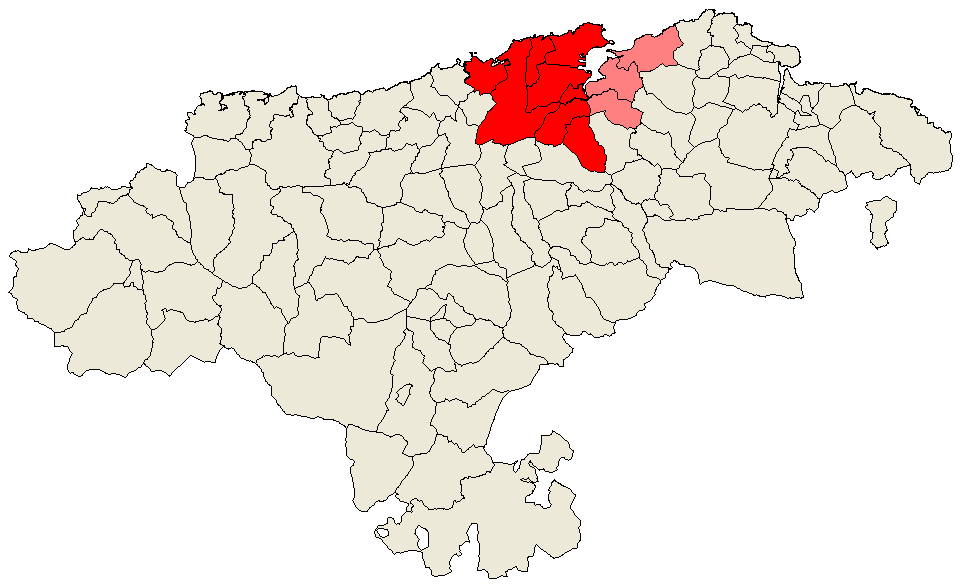
- Municipalities officially part of the comarca of the Bay of Santander are in red; those not part of the administrative comarca are in light red, but the natural one - they actually lie in the comarca of Trasmiera.
- Country: Spain
- Autonomous community: Cantabria
- Province: Cantabria
- Capital: Santander
- Municipalities: List: El Astillero, Camargo, Miengo, Penagos, Piélagos, Santa Cruz de Bezana, Santander, Villaescusa

Area
  - Total: 263.0 km^{2} (101.5 sq mi)

Population (2018)
  - Total: 269,335
  - Density: 1,024/km^{2} (2,652/sq mi)

GDP
  - Metro: €12.839 billion (2020)
- Time zone: UTC+1 (CET)
  - Summer (DST): UTC+2 (CEST)

The Bay of Santander is both a comarca of Cantabria and the largest estuary on the North coast of Spain, with an extension of 22.42 km^{2} (9 km long and 5 km wide). Due to the influence of Santander and its metropolitan area, nearly half of the population of the autonomous community of Cantabria is gathered around it, which makes the anthropic pressure on this area of water quite notable.

The entrance to the bay is lined by the Sardinero beaches, where the Isle of Mouro with its lighthouse can be found. The access to its interior is through a narrow channel of water between the Magdalena Peninsula, near to which are the Isle of the Tower and Horadada Island; and the sandbanks of the El Puntal, a long series of beaches and dunes that protect the tranquil inner waters of the bay.

The morphology of the bay has suffered important changes in the last centuries. It is estimated that more than 50% of the original extension has been filled up, drying up a large amount of marsh area for grasslands, to expand the Port of Santander, and to create new industrial and residential areas. At the moment, work is going on to recover the seaside ecosystem in some areas of high ecological value.

== Municipalities ==
The municipalities within the administrative comarca are as follows, listed below with their areas and populations:

| Name | Area (km^{2}) | Population (2001) | Population (2011) | Population (2018) |
|---|---|---|---|---|
| Camargo | 36.6 | 24,498 | 31,498 | 30,263 |
| El Astillero | 6.8 | 14,353 | 17,854 | 18,108 |
| Miengo | 24.5 | 3,629 | 4,664 | 4,713 |
| Penagos | 31.7 | 1,703 | 1,926 | 2,108 |
| Piélagos | 83.3 | 13,035 | 23,036 | 25,223 |
| Santa Cruz de Bezana | 17.3 | 9,149 | 12,094 | 12,964 |
| Santander | 34.8 | 180,717 | 178,085 | 172,044 |
| Villaescusa | 28.0 | 3,323 | 3,735 | 3,912 |

== Rivers and rias ==
Several rivers empty into the Bay of Santander. The most important is the Ria de Solía, in the South. The Ria de San Salvador empties in the center of the Bay via the Ria de Astillero while in the East flow the Rias of Carmen and Raos; to the West is the Ria de Cubas, which is the mouth of the Miera River.

== Geology ==
The Santander Bay is formed by a diapir generated during the alpinotype orogeny of the Tertiary period. Its materials are composed of clays and salts (specially Keuper's gypsums) that ascended taking advantage of the faults. This movement generated an increase of the fracturing and an important dragging of rocks from the outer layers. The weakness zone generated by the Keuper's clays made easier its erosion compared with other sandstone or limestone areas, which involved the advance of the sea and the formation of the bay.

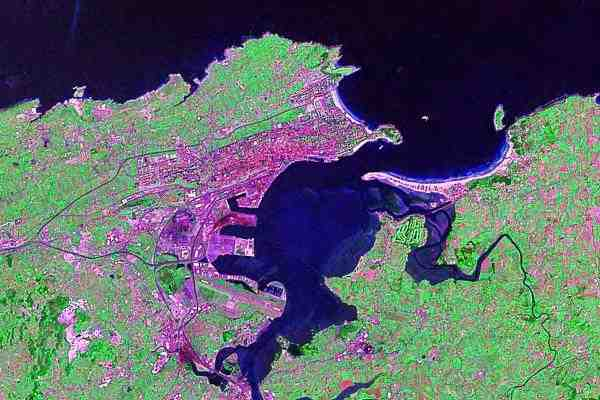
Spectral image of the Santander bay taken by the NASA satellite LandSat.

== Flora and fauna ==
- Common Tern (Sterna hirundo)
