= Magdalena Peninsula =

Peninsula in Santander, Cantabria, Spain

Coordinates: 43°28′9″N 3°45′58″W

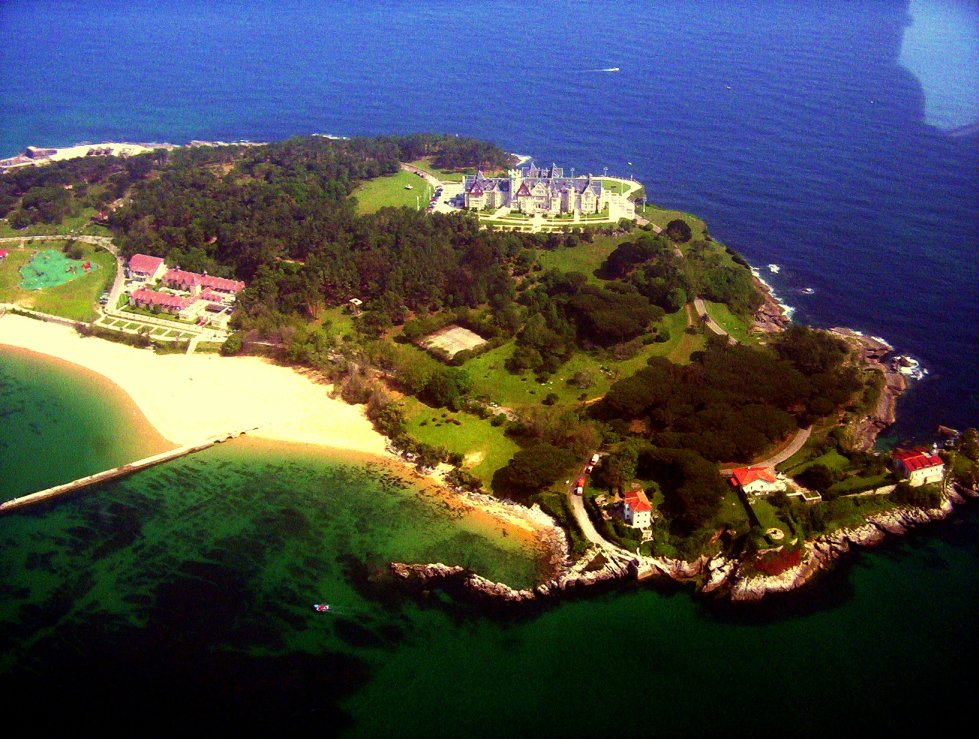
The Magdalena Peninsula is located in Santander, Cantabria, Spain.

The Magdalena Peninsula is a 69-acre (28 hectare) peninsula located near the entrance to the Bay of Santander in the city of Santander, Cantabria, along the north coast of Spain.

The peninsula is a popular recreational destination for both tourists and locals. The historic Palacio de la Magdalena is located on the peninsula, which along with its surrounding gardens, is designated as a cultural heritage site. Also located on the peninsula is a small zoo, three galleons of the Cantabrian mariner Vital Alsar Ramírez, two beaches and a lighthouse.
