= Sardinero =

Beach in Santander, Spain

Coordinates: 43°28′30″N 3°47′06″W

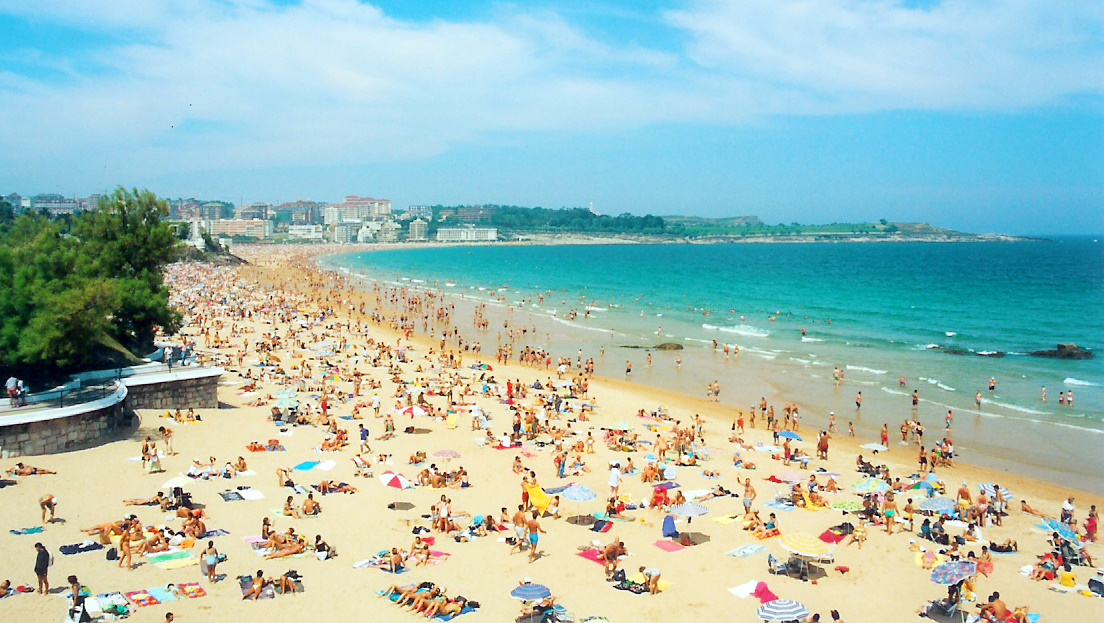
The beach of Sardinero

Sardinero is a popular beach located in the Spanish city of Santander, Cantabria. The beach is divided in two by the gardens of Piquio about one-quarter the way along its length, stretching from the Magdalena Peninsula to Mataleñas; two further adjacent beaches are also sometimes included. In total about 4,300 feet (1,300 meters) long and 260 feet (79 meters) deep, the beach features fine golden sand and moderate waves; it is bordered by a wide promenade running its entire length.

Sardinero is lined with hotels, restaurants, and a casino, and is regarded as one of the most elegant beach resorts in Spain.
