= Villaescusa, Cantabria =

Villaescusa
- Municipality
- Coat of arms

- Location in Cantabria Location in Spain
- Coordinates: 43°22′23″N 3°51′3″W
- Country: Spain
- Autonomous community: Cantabria
- Province: Cantabria
- Comarca: Santander
- Judicial district: Santander
- Capital: La Concha

Area
  - Total: 28.02 km^{2} (10.82 sq mi)
- Elevation: 20 m (66 ft)

Population (2025-01-01)
  - Total: 3,970
  - Density: 142/km^{2} (367/sq mi)
- Time zone: UTC+1 (CET)
  - Summer (DST): UTC+2 (CEST)

Villaescusa is a municipality located in the autonomous community of Cantabria, Spain. It has a population of 3,802 inhabitants (2013).

== Localities ==
- La Concha (Caipital)
- Liaño
- Obregón
- Villanueva de Villaescusa
