= List of ports in Spain =

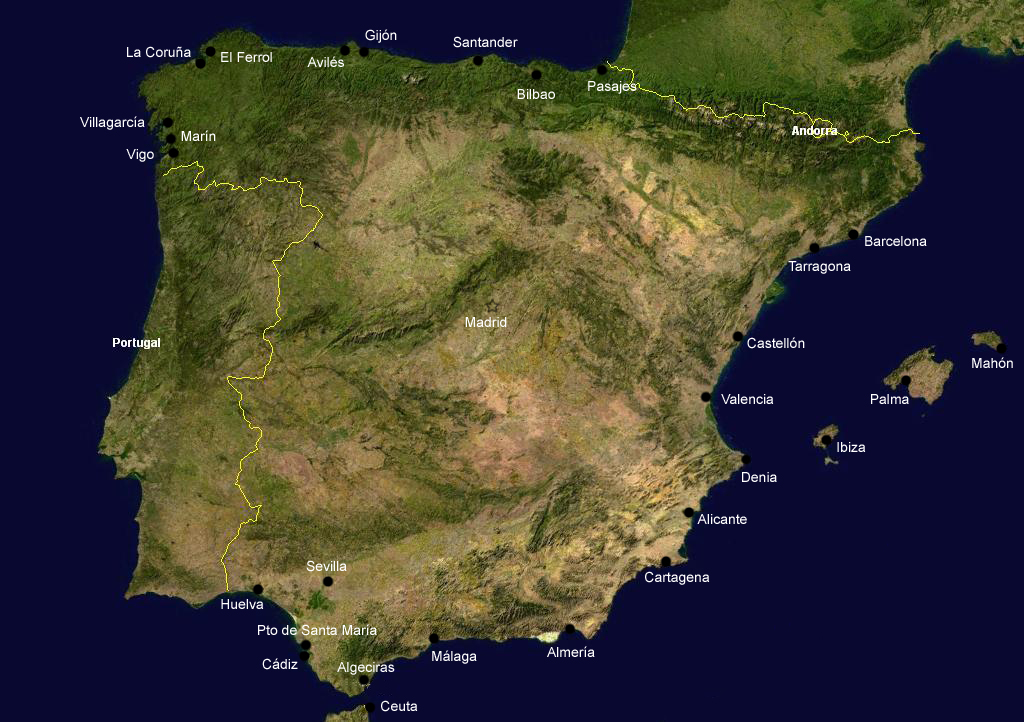
Map showing the location of the ports listed on this page

The following is a list of the ports in Spain declared to be of "general interest" and thus, under the exclusive competence of the General Administration of the State. They are operated by 28 different port authorities, which are coordinated in turn by Puertos del Estado, a State-owned company.

Port	Port Authority	Region	Cargo tonnage in 2019 (MTn)	Ref.
Bay of Algeciras	Bay of Algeciras	Andalusia	109.4	
Tarifa	Bay of Algeciras	Andalusia		
Bay of Cádiz (Note: Including Puerto de Santa María, Free Zone of Cádiz, Puerto Real, Bajo de la Cabezuela and Puerto Sherry.)	Bay of Cádiz	Andalusia	4.4	
Almería	Almería	Andalusia		
Carboneras	Almería	Andalusia		
Seville	Seville	Andalusia		
Huelva	Huelva	Andalusia	33.8	
Motril		Andalusia	2.8	
Málaga		Andalusia	3.5	
Ceuta	Ceuta	Ceuta		
Valencia	Valencia	Valencian Community	81.1	
Sagunto	Valencia	Valencian Community	7.0	
Gandía	Valencia	Valencian Community		
Alicante	Alicante	Valencian Community		
Castellón	Castellón	Valencian Community	20.7	
Palma		Balearic Islands		
Alcúdia		Balearic Islands		
Mahón		Balearic Islands		
Ibiza		Balearic Islands		
Savina		Balearic Islands		
Melilla	Melilla	Melilla		
Barcelona	Barcelona	Catalonia	67.7	
Tarragona	Tarragona	Catalonia	33.3	
Bilbao	Bilbao	Basque Country	35.5	
Pasaia		Basque Country	3.2	
Cartagena (Note: Including the dock of Escombreras.)	Cartagena	Region of Murcia	34.5	
Gijón-Musel	Gijón	Asturias	17.4	
Avilés	Avilés	Asturias	5.1	
Santander	Santander	Cantabria	6.6	
Arrecife		Canary Islands		
Las Palmas (Note: Including Salinetas and Arinaga.)	Las Palmas	Canary Islands	22.8	
Puerto del Rosario	Las Palmas	Canary Islands		
La Hondura		Canary Islands		
Santa Cruz de Tenerife (Note: Including Granadilla.)		Canary Islands		
Los Cristianos	Santa Cruz de Tenerife	Canary Islands		
San Sebastián de la Gomera		Canary Islands		
Santa Cruz de la Palma		Canary Islands	0.9	
La Estaca		Canary Islands		
Ferrol	Ferrol-San Cibrao	Galicia	11.1	
San Cibrao	Ferrol-San Cibrao	Galicia		
A Coruña	A Coruña	Galicia	13.6	
Vilagarcía da Arousa		Galicia		
Marín	Marín-Ria de Pontevedra	Galicia		
Pontevedra		Galicia		
Vigo		Galicia	4.2	

== See also ==
- Puertos (national entity)
- List of airports in Spain
- Transport in Spain
