= Port of Valencia =

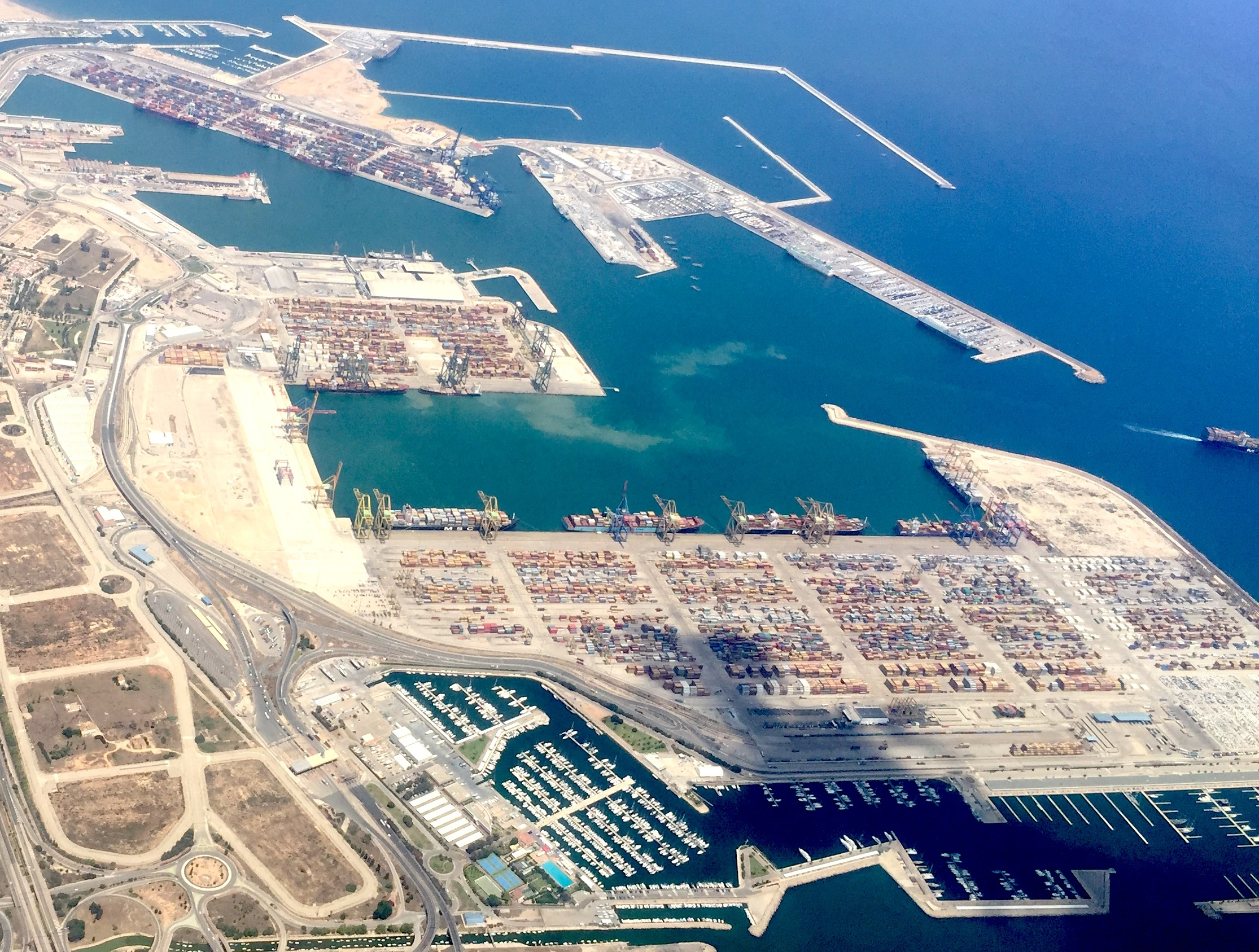
- Harbour
- Click on the map for a fullscreen view

Location
- Country: Spain
- Location: Valencia
- Coordinates: 39.4457°N 0.3199°W
- UN/LOCODE: ESVLC

Details
- Operated by: Port Authority of Valencia
- Type of harbour: Natural/Artificial
- Size: 600 ha (6 sq km)
- No. of berths: 40
- No. of wharfs: 72
- Employees: 15,000 people
- General manager: Joan Calabuig Rull

Statistics
- Vessel arrivals: 7,521 (2022)
- Annual cargo tonnage: 79.3 million tonnes (2022)
- Annual container volume: 5.0 million TEU (2022)
- Passenger traffic: 1,73 million passengers (2022)
- Website www.valenciaport.com

The Port of Valencia is a seaport in Valencia, Spain. In 2021 it was the second busiest port in the Mediterranean by TEU after the port of Tanger Med. As of 2023, it moves an annual cargo traffic of around seventy-seven million tonnes (seventy-six million long tons; eighty-five million short tons) and 4.8 million TEU.

The port is also an important employer in the area, with more than 15,000 employees who provide services to more than 7,500 ships every year.

== History ==
The history of the Port of Valencia began in 1483, when King Ferdinand the Catholic granted Antoni Joan the privilege of building a wooden bridge on the beach of the Grao district, called the Pont de Fusta.

From 1483 until the 19th century, various construction projects were built in the port, but because of periodic flooding of the Turia River and the continual movements of sand on the beach the port was not notably successful. However, traffic did increase incrementally over time and the king eventually granted trading privileges with other kingdoms and sovereign states in 1679 and for the Americas in 1791, with Valencia becoming the sixth maritime province in Spain.

In December 2023, the northern expansion of the port of Valencia was approved. It involves the construction of a new terminal with a capacity of 5M TEU, with a public investment of about €660 million. The operator of the infrastructure, MSC, will invest about €1,050 million.

== Description ==
The three ports controlled by the Port Authority of Valencia are in Valencia, Sagunto and Gandía. They are located on the shores of the Mediterranean Sea, along an 80 km stretch of Spain's eastern coastline.

The Port of Valencia is the centre of economic activity in an area of influence encompassing a radius of 350 km. The port has a quay length of 12 km and a total storage area of 300 acres (1.2 km^{2}).

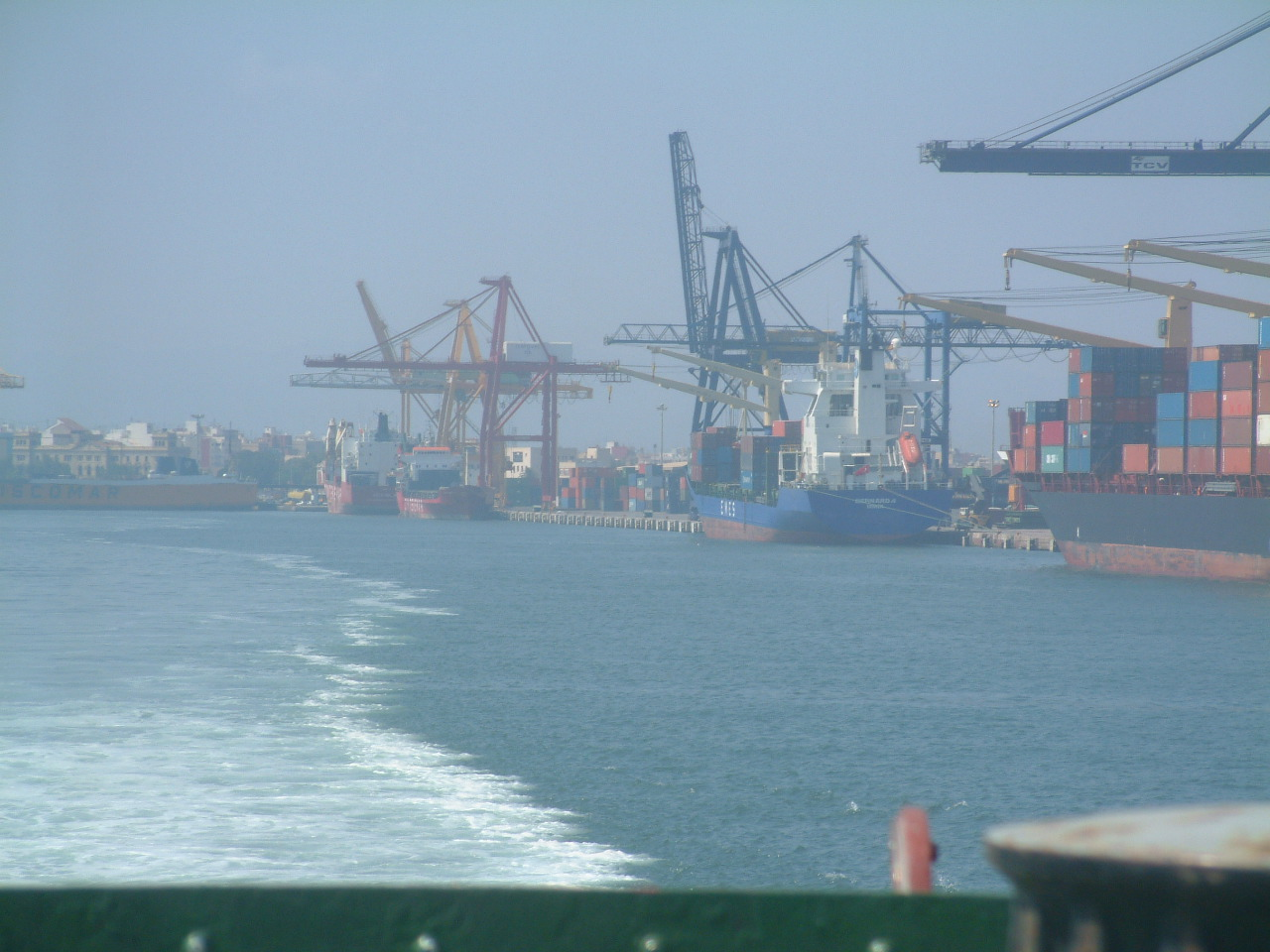
Port of Valencia

Valencia Port Authority (PAV) has announced plans for the construction of a new container terminal in the northern expansion by 2030.

== Satellite ports ==
=== Port of Sagunt ===
This port has an annual traffic capacity of 10% of the entire port – its main cargo is liquefied natural gas; three million tonnes of gas are shipped per year due to the regasification plant located nearby.

Around 70% of the port's current traffic consists of iron and steel products and the rest of fertilizers, construction materials, timber and perishable products.

=== Port of Gandia ===
This port has an annual traffic capacity of 1.5 % of the entire port, and specialises in the export and import of forestry products: timber, reels, pulp, paper and furniture.

== Statistics ==
In 2023 the Port of Valencia handled 77,163,936 tonnes of cargo and 4,796,985 TEU making it the second busiest cargo port in Spain and the largest container port in the country.

General statistics between 2021 - 2023
	2021	2022	2023
Liquid Bulk *	3,867,779	5,819,229	5,296,951
Solid Bulk *	2,159,064	2,255,164	2,465,568
Conventional General Cargo *	14,806,681	14,763,010	15,310,254
Continerised General Cargo *	64,017,231	56,125,555	56,673,651
Fishing *	1,057	1,053	1,114
Supplies *	417,914	401,718	416,398
Total traffic (t)*	85,269,726	79,365,321	77,163,936
Vessels number	7,295	7,521	7,575
Containers (TEU)	5,604,478	5,052,272	4,796,985
Passengers	635,689	1,373,552	1,558,180

* figures in tonnes

== See also ==
- List of ports in Spain
- List of busiest ports in Europe
- List of world's busiest container ports
- Valencia Street Circuit
