= Port of Marín and Ria de Pontevedra =

Port in Pontevedra, Spain

Port of Marín-Pontevedra
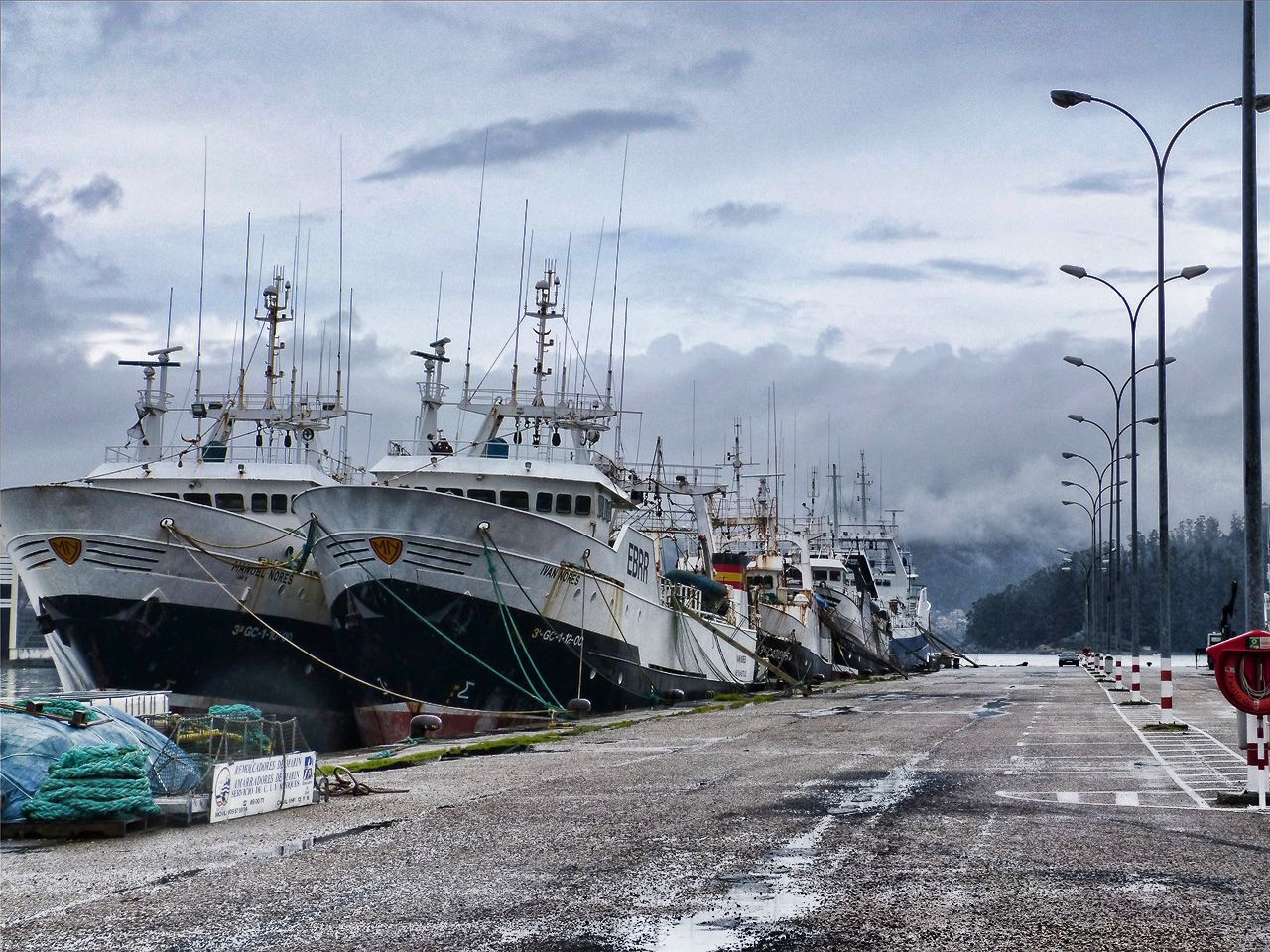
- Click on the map for a fullscreen view

Location
- Country: Spain
- Location: Marín, Pontevedra
- Coordinates: 42°24′03″N 8°41′31″W
- UN/LOCODE: ESMPG

Details
- Operated by: Autoridad Portuaria de Marín y Ría de Pontevedra
- Size of harbour: 10,000 hectares
- President: José Benito Suárez Costa

Statistics
- Annual cargo tonnage: 2,523,054 tonnes (2017)
- Website www.apmarin.com

The port of Marín and Ria de Pontevedra is located in the municipalities of Marín and Pontevedra, Galicia (Spain). It is on the southern shore of the Ria de Pontevedra.

The port stretches from Punta Pesqueira in the municipality of Marín to Placeres in the municipality of Pontevedra. It is used as a merchant port (containers, bulk) and Fishing port. It is also used as a marina.

== History ==
Port activity has been documented in Pontevedra and its ria since Antiquity, thanks to the Roman milestone, which is preserved in the Pontevedra Museum and whose inscription refers to its importance as a maritime communication route.

In the 16th century, Pontevedra was the most important city in Galicia and the port of Pontevedra was the busiest in the region and in northwest Spain. Some historians estimate that the economic movement generated by the settlement could reach 80,000 Ducats per year.

In the 17th century, the port of Pontevedra began to decline due to the lack of depth needed for the increasingly large ships and due to the silting up caused by the Flooding of the Lérez River. The port activity was gradually transferred to Marín.

In the middle of the 18th century, the ria of Pontevedra began its commercial and industrial development. Its wealth in fishing led to the establishment of numerous salting and Canning factories and other activities related to the sea. The growth and importance of the port in Marín was demonstrated as early as the 18th century thanks to the Oseira monastery, which opened it up to fishing and foreign trade.

In 1861, the port of Marin became an important starting point for new routes to America. A direct round trip service to Buenos Aires and Montevideo was inaugurated. In 1868, Marín became a first-class maritime district in Spain and benefited from the services of many European and South American consulates due to the important commercial and migratory movement.

In 1883, the City Council of Pontevedra requested that the port of Marín become a port of general interest and on 30 August 1886 it was qualified as such.

On 5 March 1933, the headquarters of the port authority was inaugurated in As Corbaceiras, in the port of Pontevedra.

In 1992, with the State Ports and Merchant Navy Act, the entity responsible for the port of Marín became the Port Authority of Marín and Ría de Pontevedra.

On 30 July 2010, the new headquarters of the Port Authority was inaugurated inside the port, in the Cantodarea Park in Marín.

== Docks and facilities ==
The Port of Marín has a total of 1,806 metres of commercial docks for maritime traffic and 2,686 metres of fishing docks used for fishing and supply activities. The port has more than 75 hectares of port space and more than 9,800 hectares of sea area.

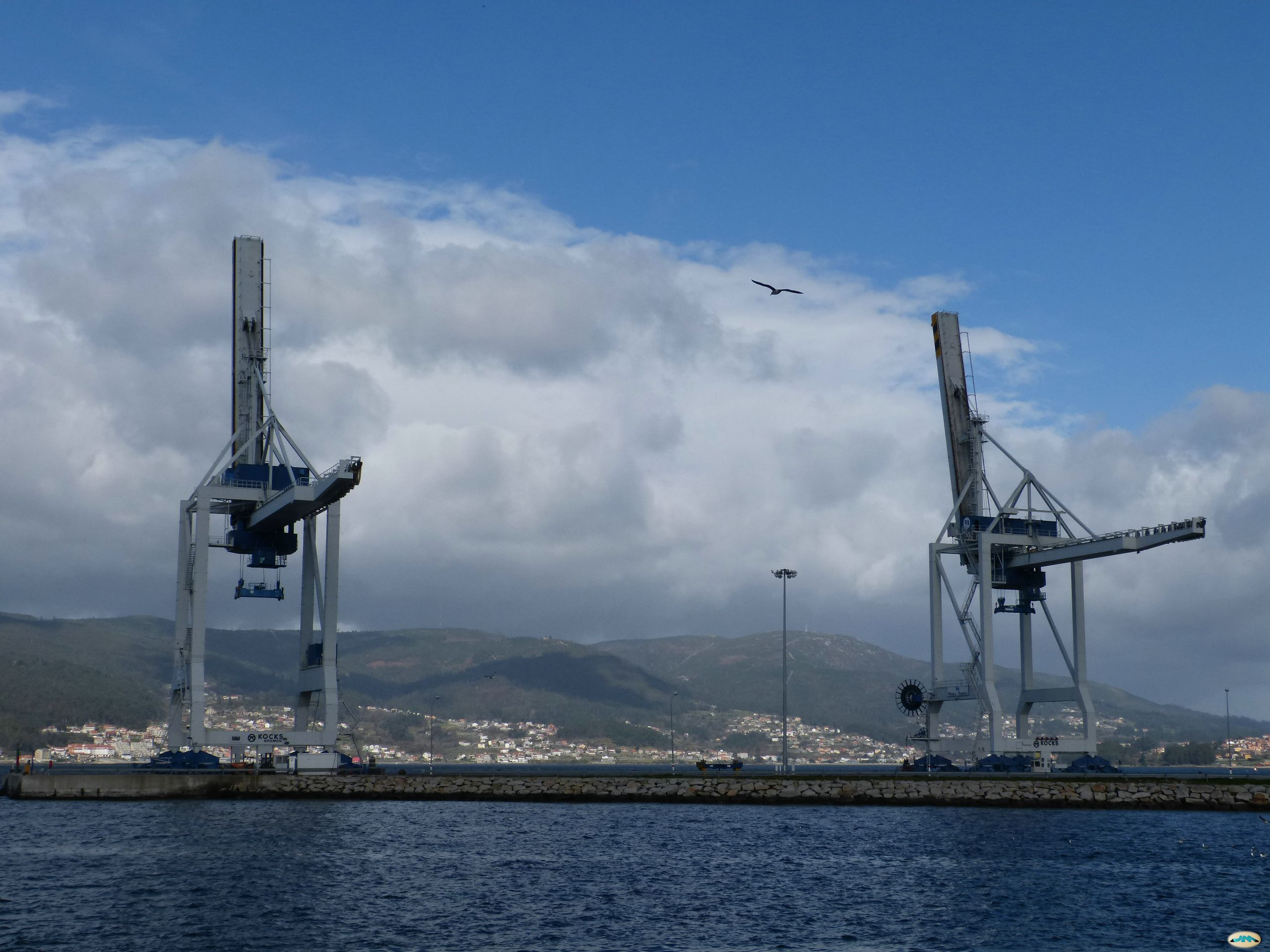
Cranes in the Port of Marín

The port has, among other facilities, a modern, air-conditioned Fish Auction Hall, a covered terminal, an internal rail network, a border inspection post and two Shipyards.

=== Commercial docks ===
- Marín Commercial Wharf: General cargo
- New Commercial Wharf of Marín No. 0: Repairs
- New Marín Commercial Wharf 1: General cargo
- Manuel Leirós Pier 1: Dry bulk cargo by special installation, general cargo
- Manuel Leirós Pier 2: Dry bulk by general installation, general cargo
- Commercial wharf South: general cargo
- Manuel Leirós transverse quay: general cargo
- Adolfo Reboredo quay 1: Container ships, general cargo
- Adolfo Reboredo quay 2: Container ships, general cargo
- Adolfo Reboredo quay 3: Container ships, general cargo
- Expansion quay East: general cargo
- West quay: general cargo, bulk

=== Fishing docks ===
- North fishing dock
- East fishing dock
- South fishing dock
- Inshore fishing dock West
- Inshore fishing dock East
- Inshore South fishing dock
- Inshore fishing ramp
- Floating piers
- Ria Passenger Jetty
- Ons Island Pier
- Repair dock 1
- Repair dock 2

== Traffic ==
=== Commercial traffic ===
In 2017, the total traffic of the port of Marín and Ría de Pontevedra was 2,523,054 tonnes. Bulk traffic accounted for 915,812 tonnes per year. The most commonly imported goods are fruit, Cereals, paper pulp, frozen fish or steel products. The port of Marín is also a major logistics hub for the reception, processing and dispatch of frozen seafood products.

Traffic has increased significantly in recent years, in particular thanks to the container terminal which generated a movement of 88,938 tonnes in 2017.

== Road and rail connections ==
=== Internal connections ===
==== Road transport ====
The docks are connected by a network of internal roads of granite paving stones on concrete.

==== Railway ====
The port of Pontevedra has an internal railway network that allows access to the unloading areas and warehouses. This internal rail network has 7,000 metres of track.

=== External connections ===
==== Road transport ====
The port is connected to the Pontevedra ring road, allowing easy access to the rest of the country, including the AP-9 motorway (A Coruña-Tui).

The PO-11 is an urban motorway of approximately 4 km that connects the AP-9 and the PO-10 (Pontevedra's southern bypass) to the Port of Marín in the southwest of the city. It serves the port and allows direct access to the port without crossing Pontevedra from the AP-9. It continues the Southern Bypass (PO-10) and crosses the AP-9 south of Pontevedra. It then branches off with the Western Bypass (PO-12) to the southwest of the city and then follows the Atlantic coast to the Port of Marín.

Exits	Cities	
	North Pontevedra – Santiago de Compostela – A Coruña Vigo – Tuy – Portugal South Pontevedra – Ourense A-57	AP-9 AP-9 PO-10
	West Pontevedra – Pontevedra-Marin Avenue	PO-12
01	Industrial areas	
02	Port of Pontevedra Only for authorized	
	Marín Centre – Marín- Marquès de Valterra Avenue	

==== Railway ====
The railway in the service area of the Port of Marín is connected to the national network via the main station in Pontevedra, allowing the transport of goods through RENFE.

== Gallery ==
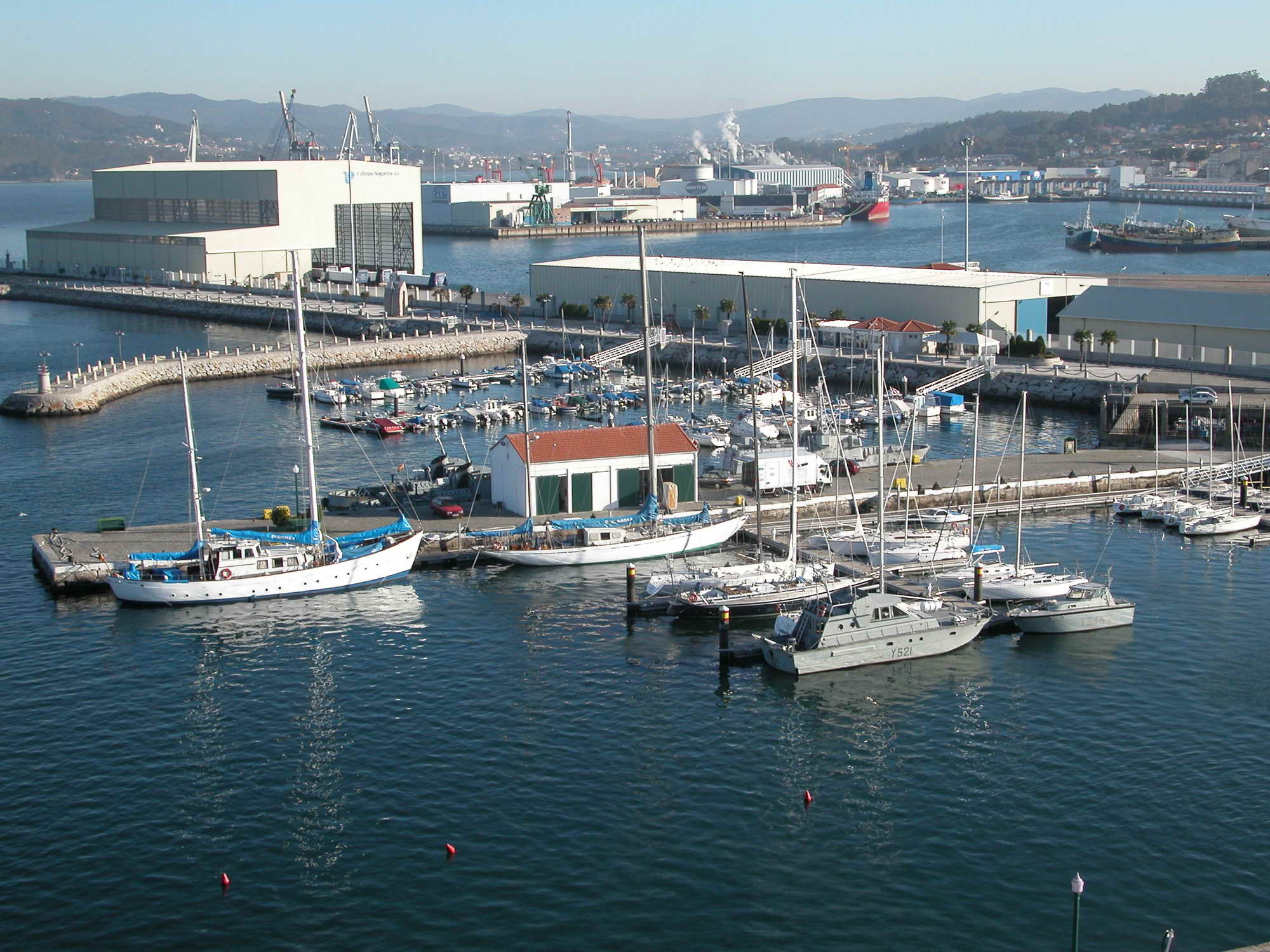

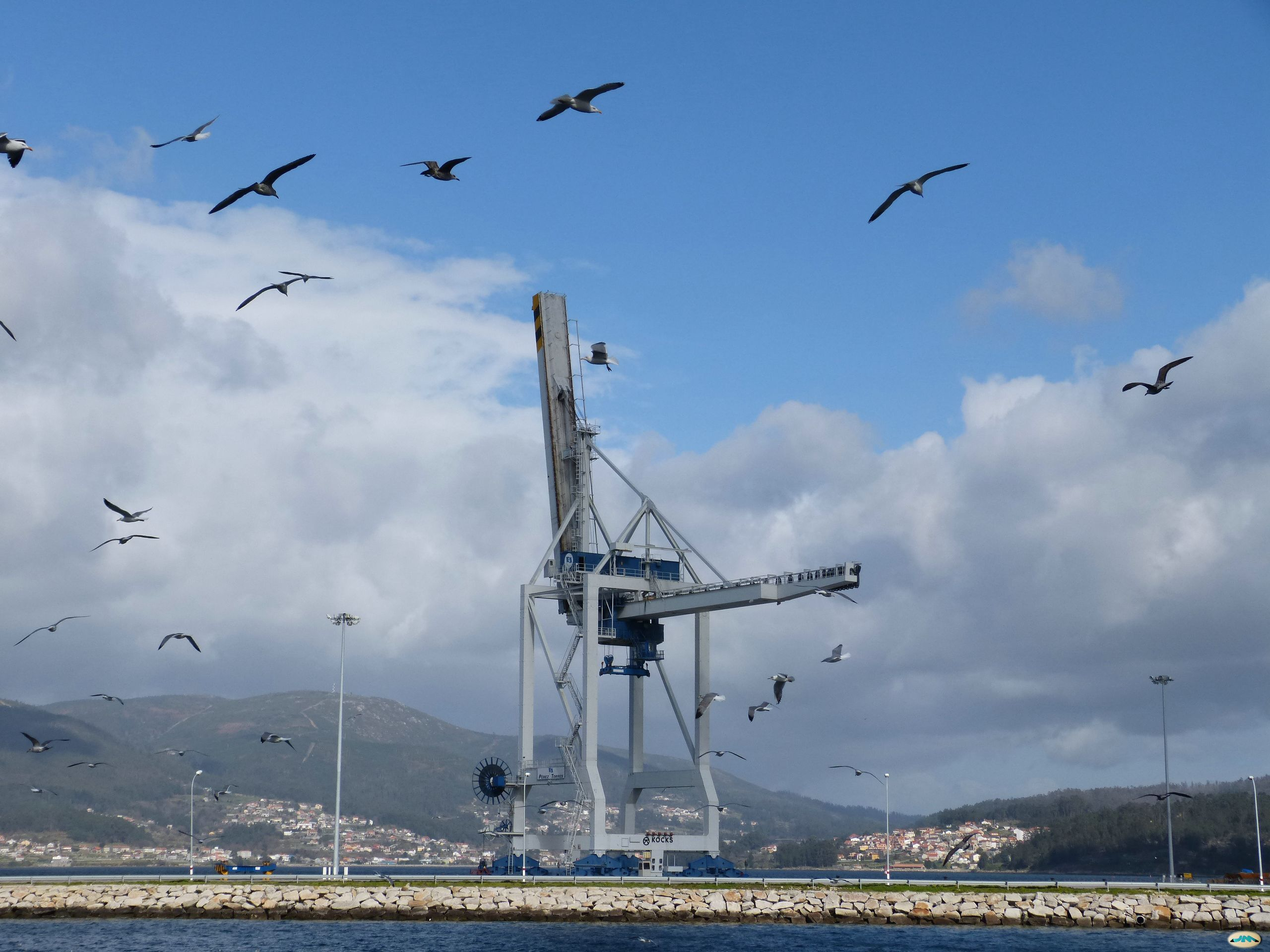

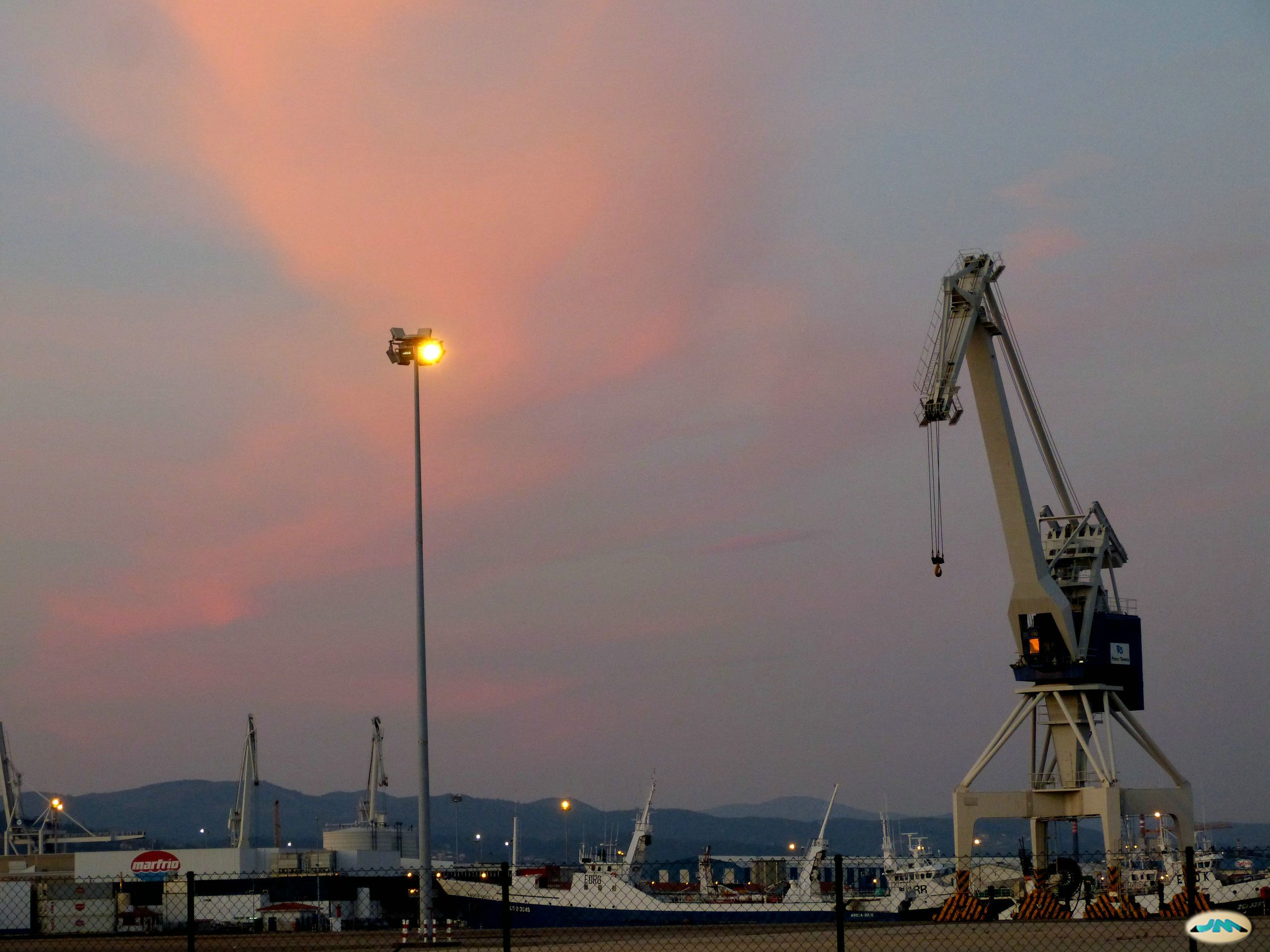

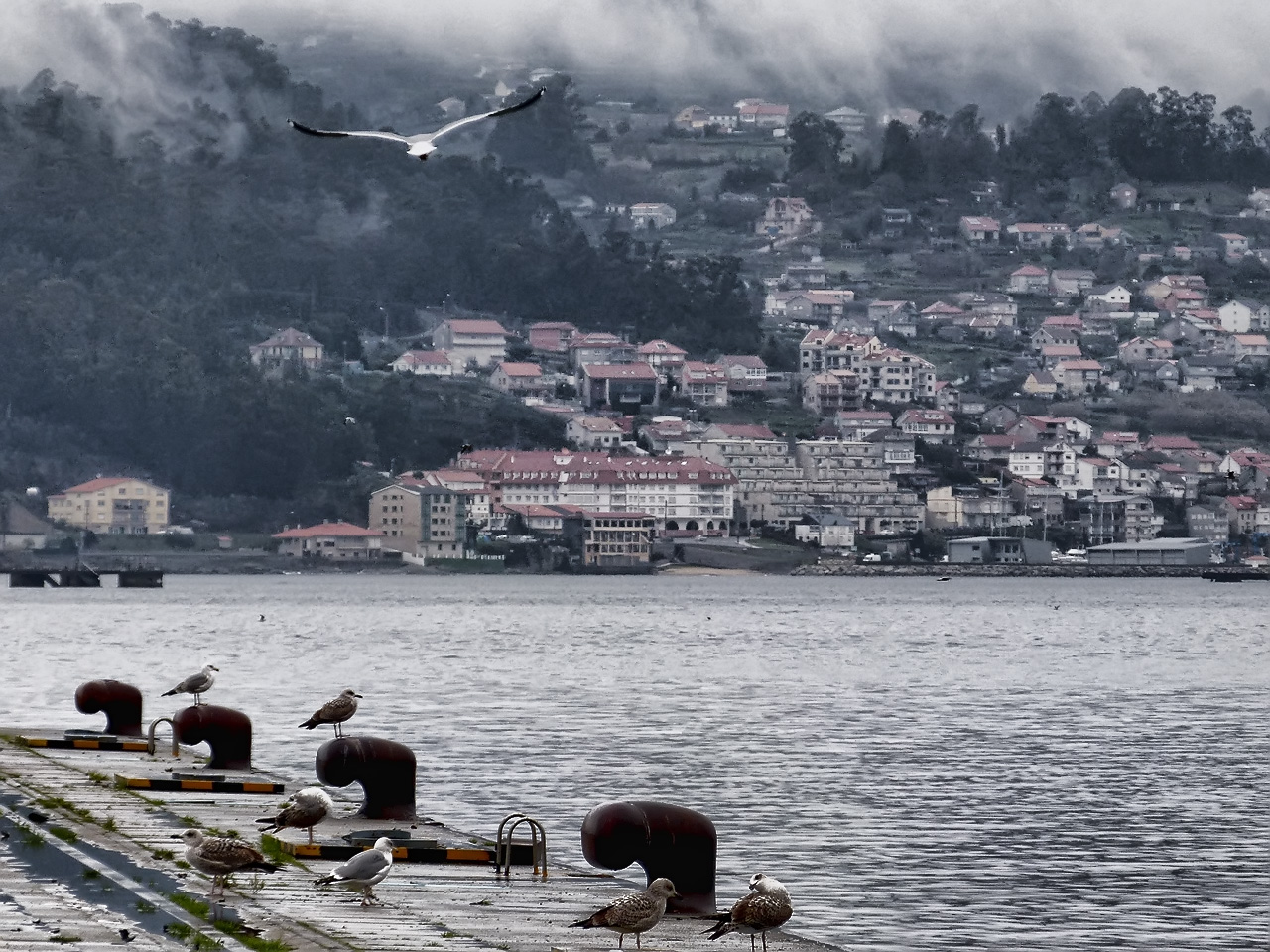

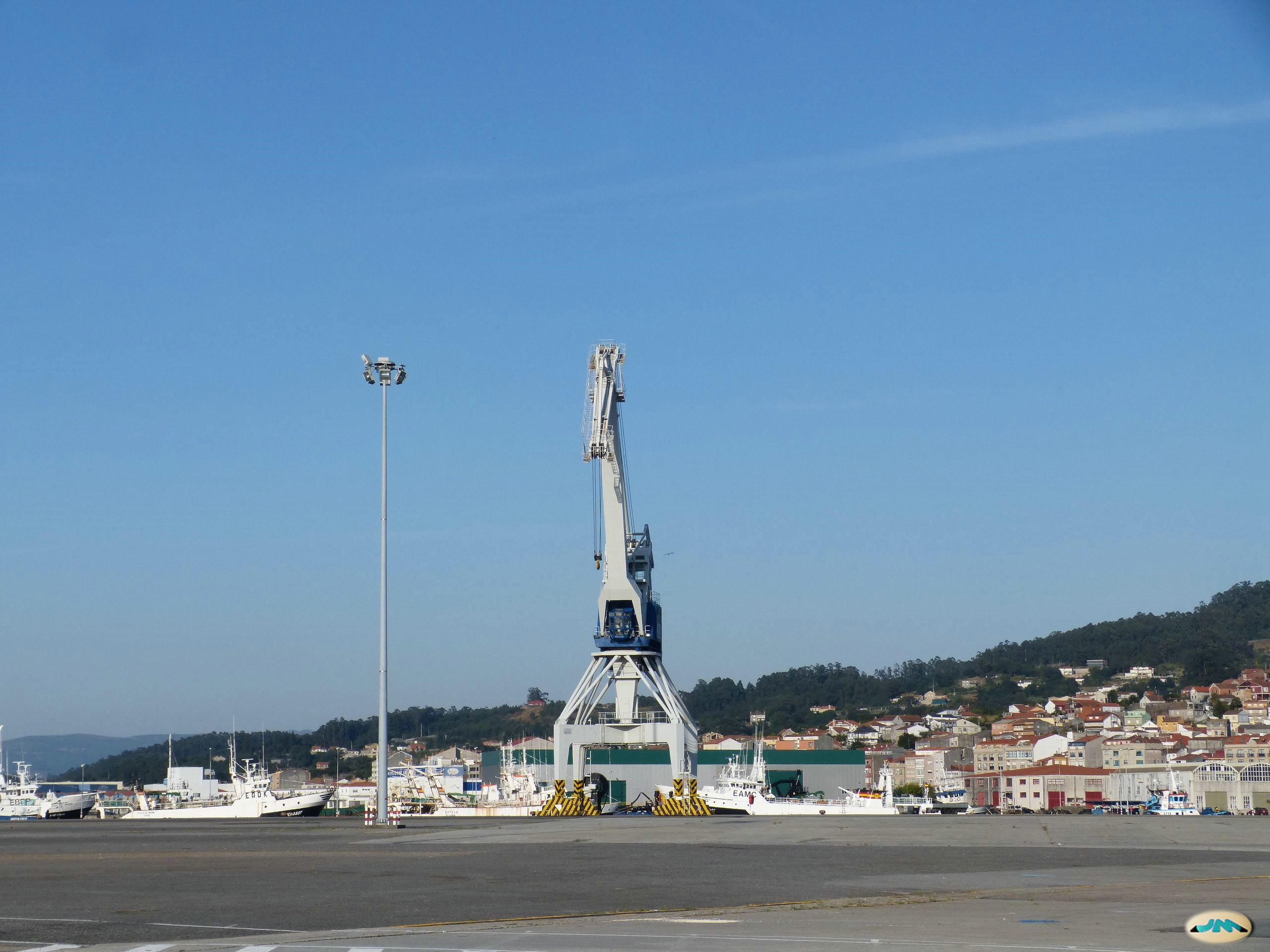

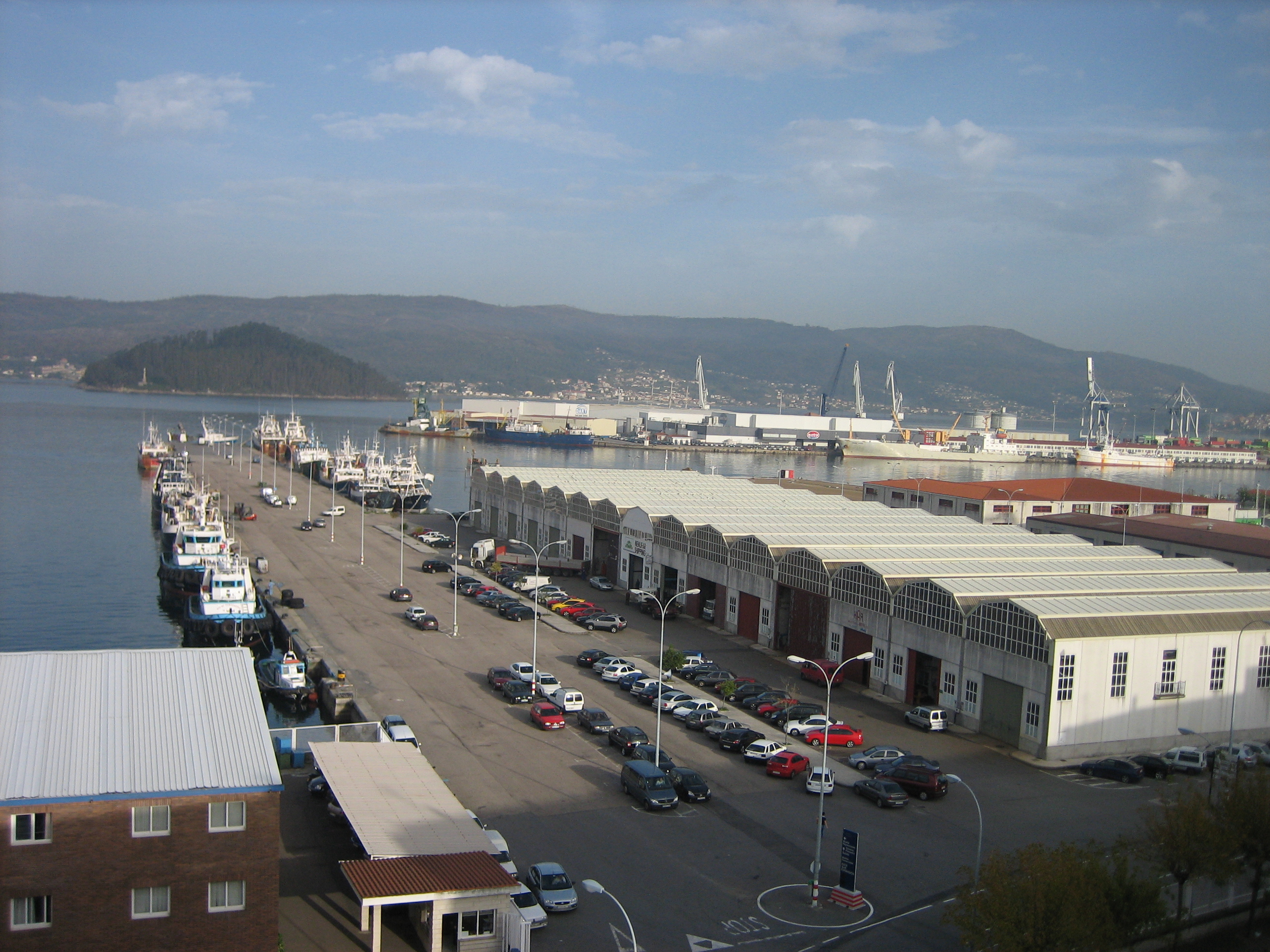

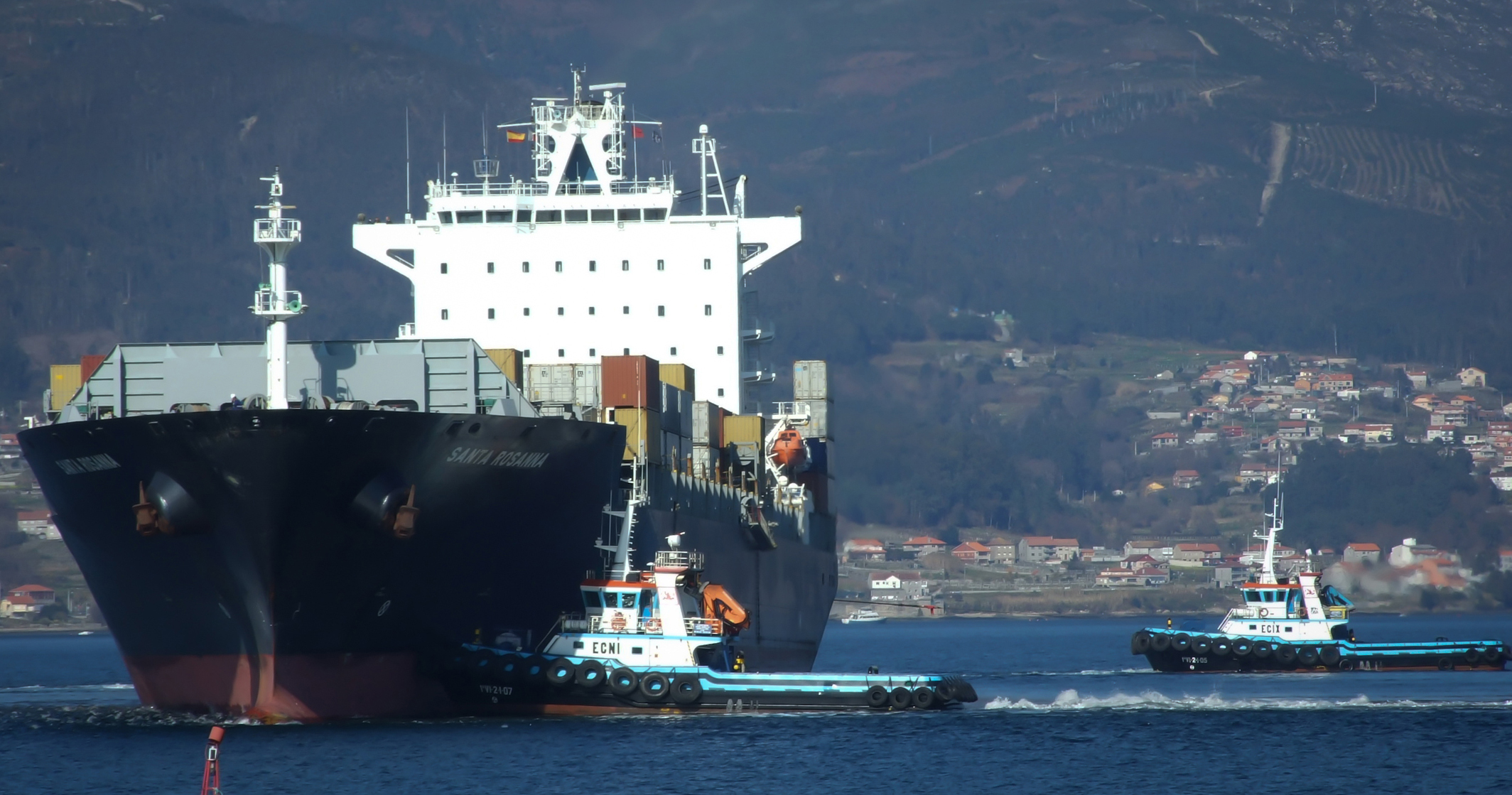

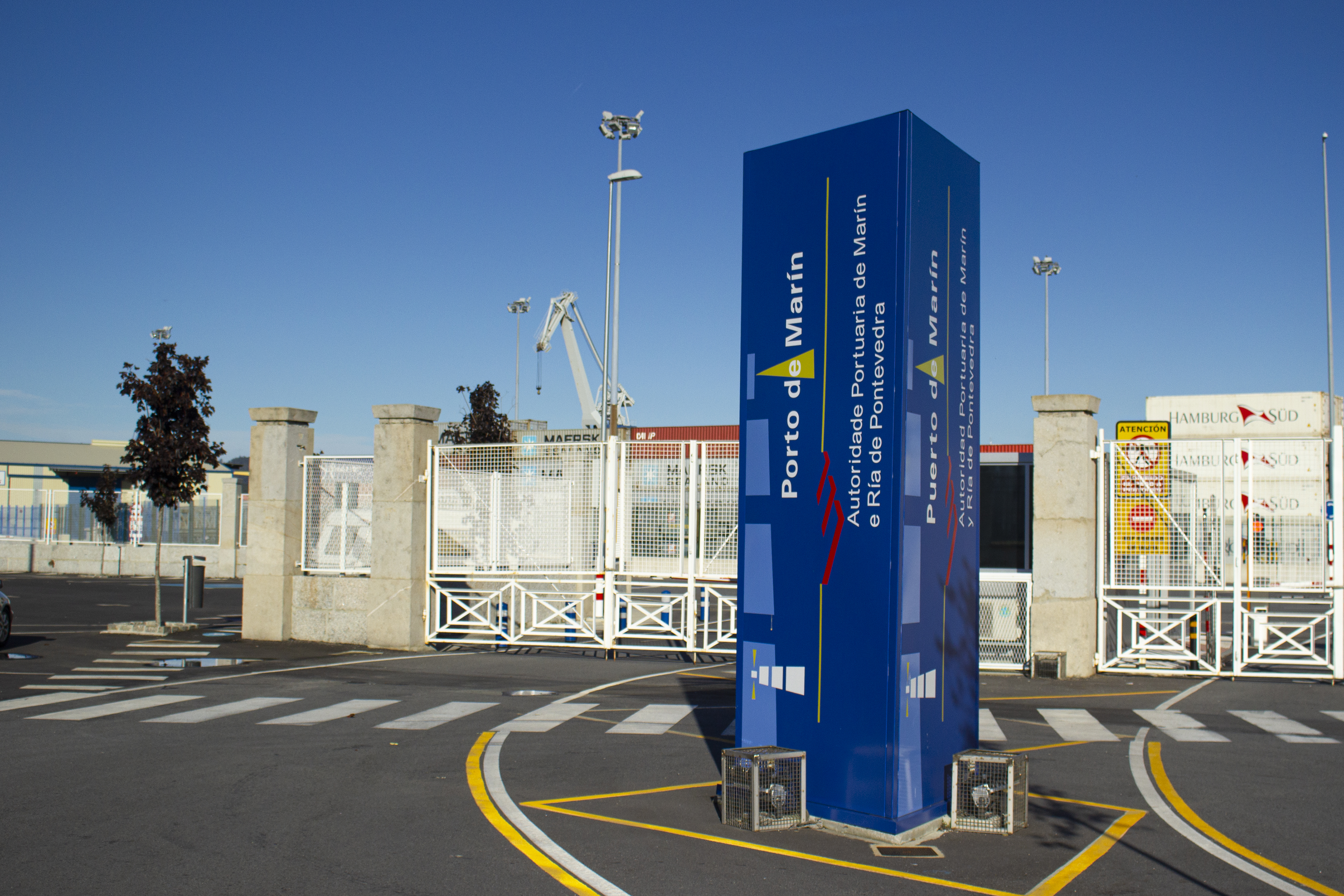

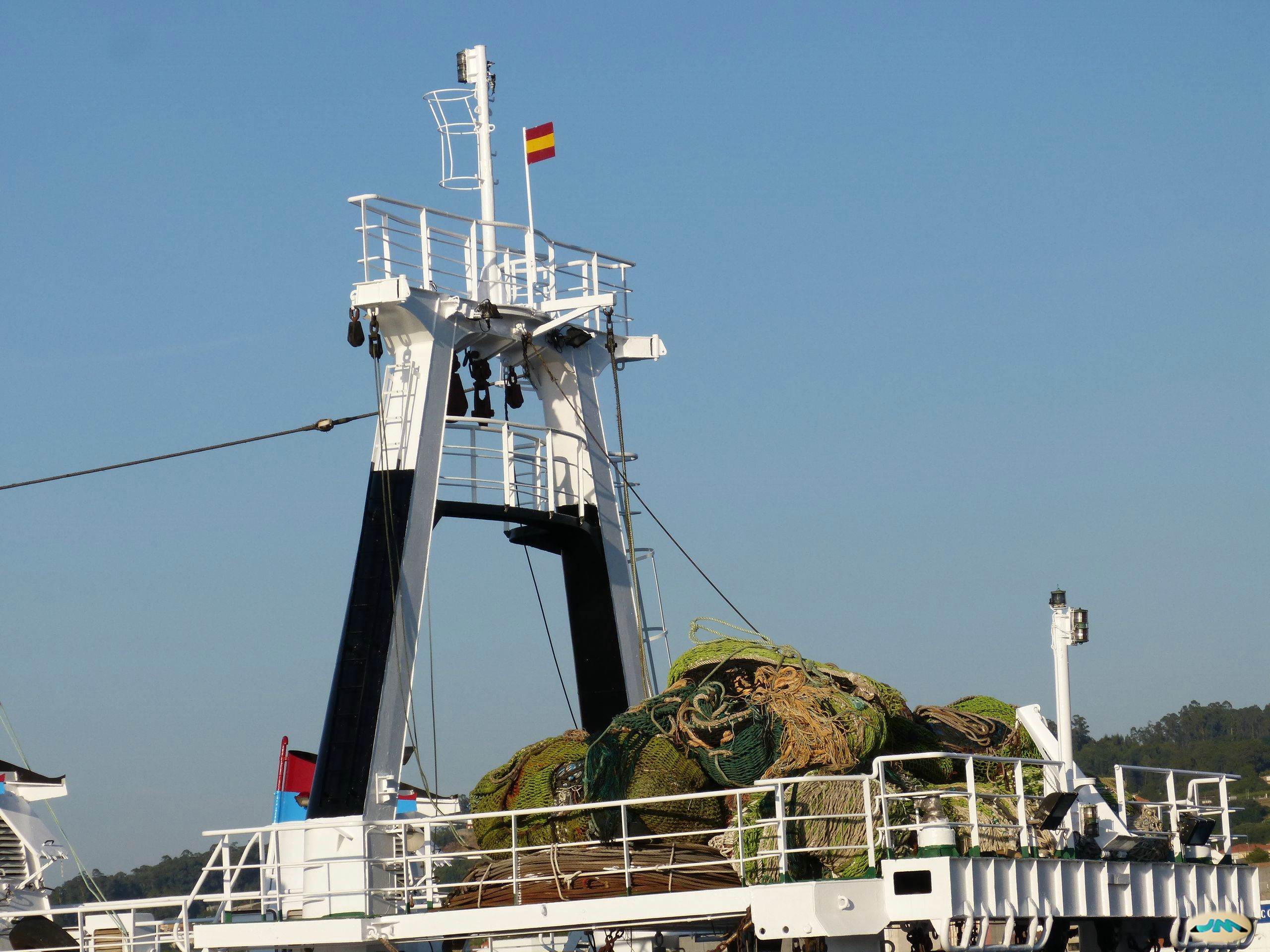

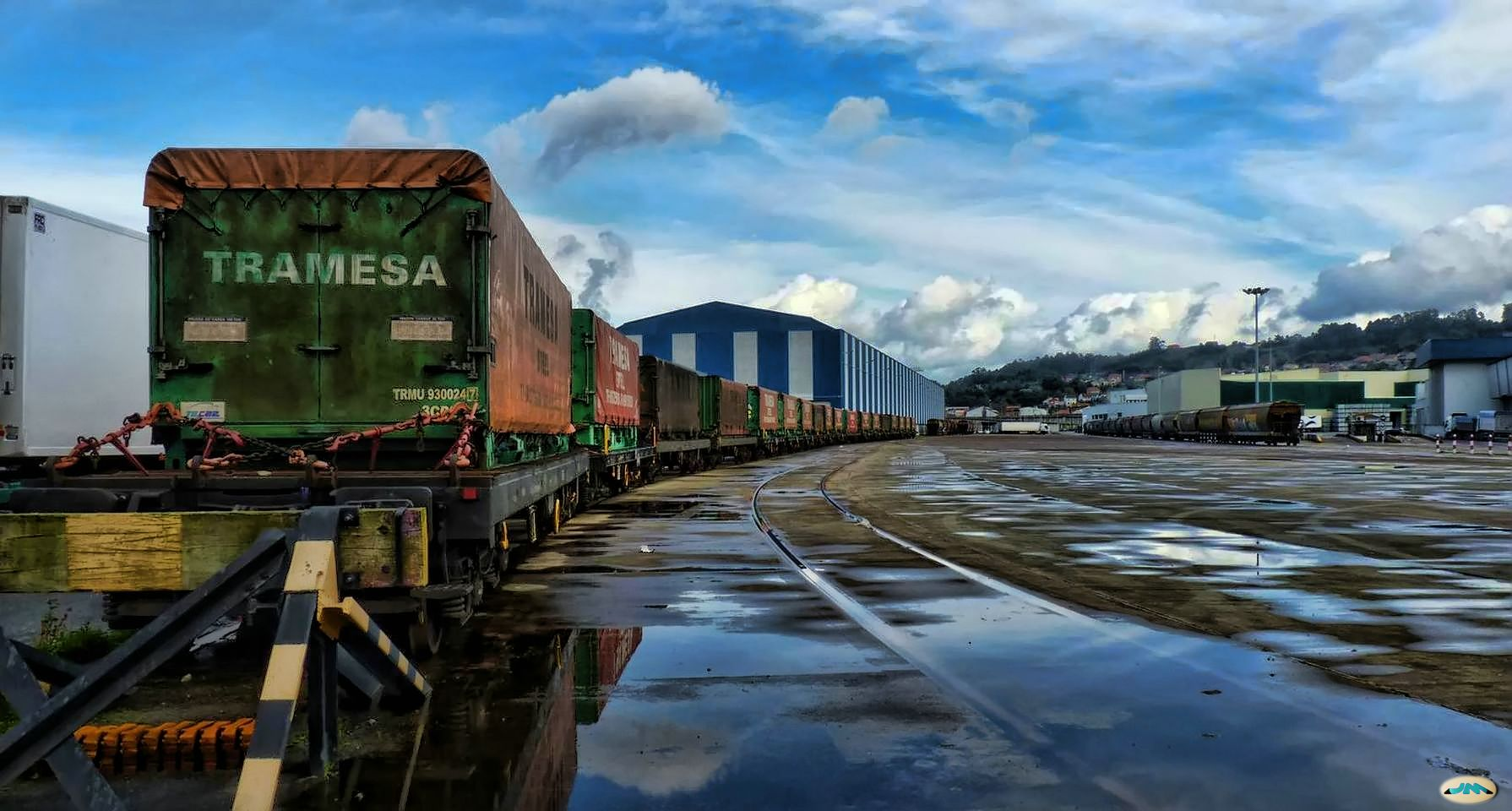

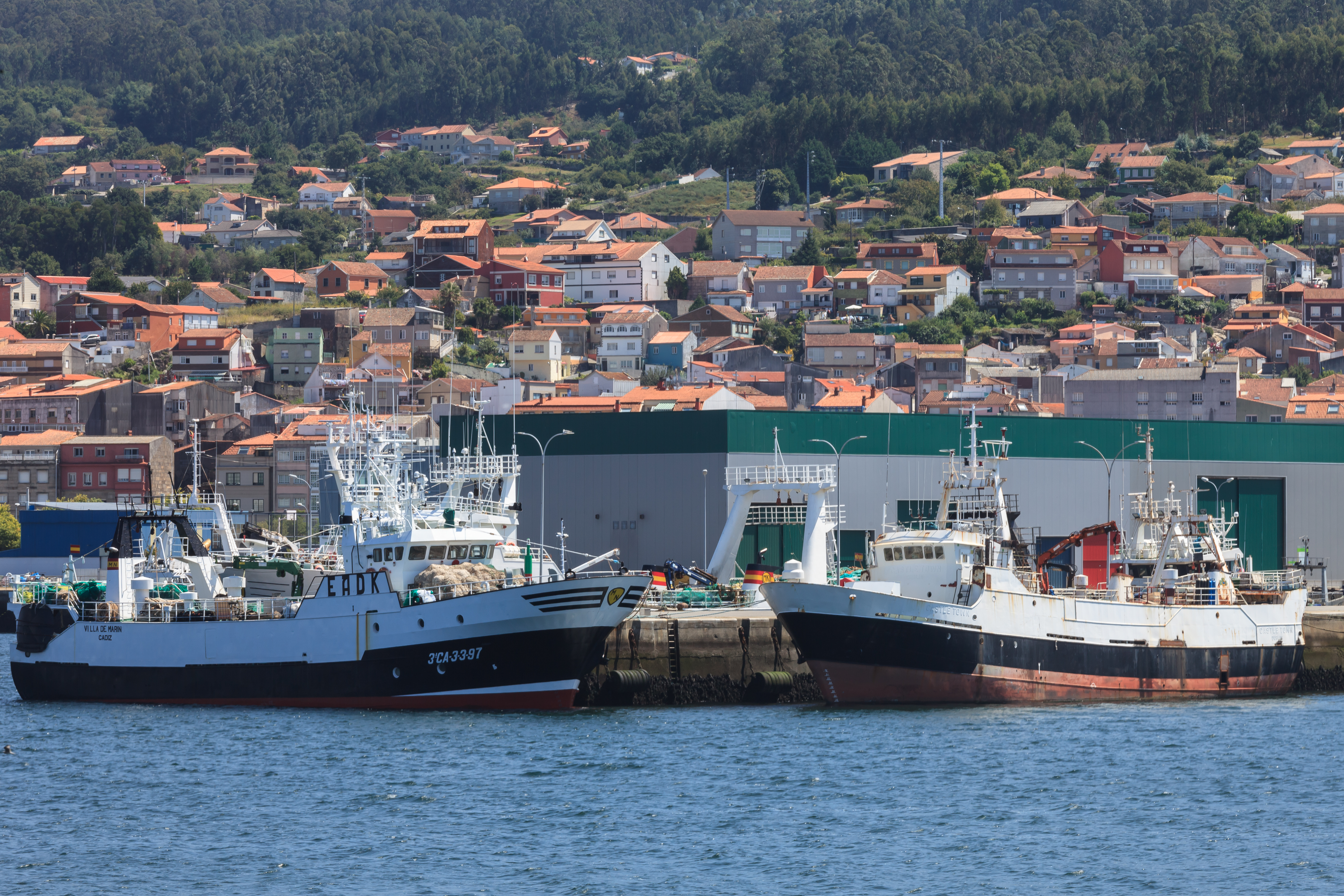

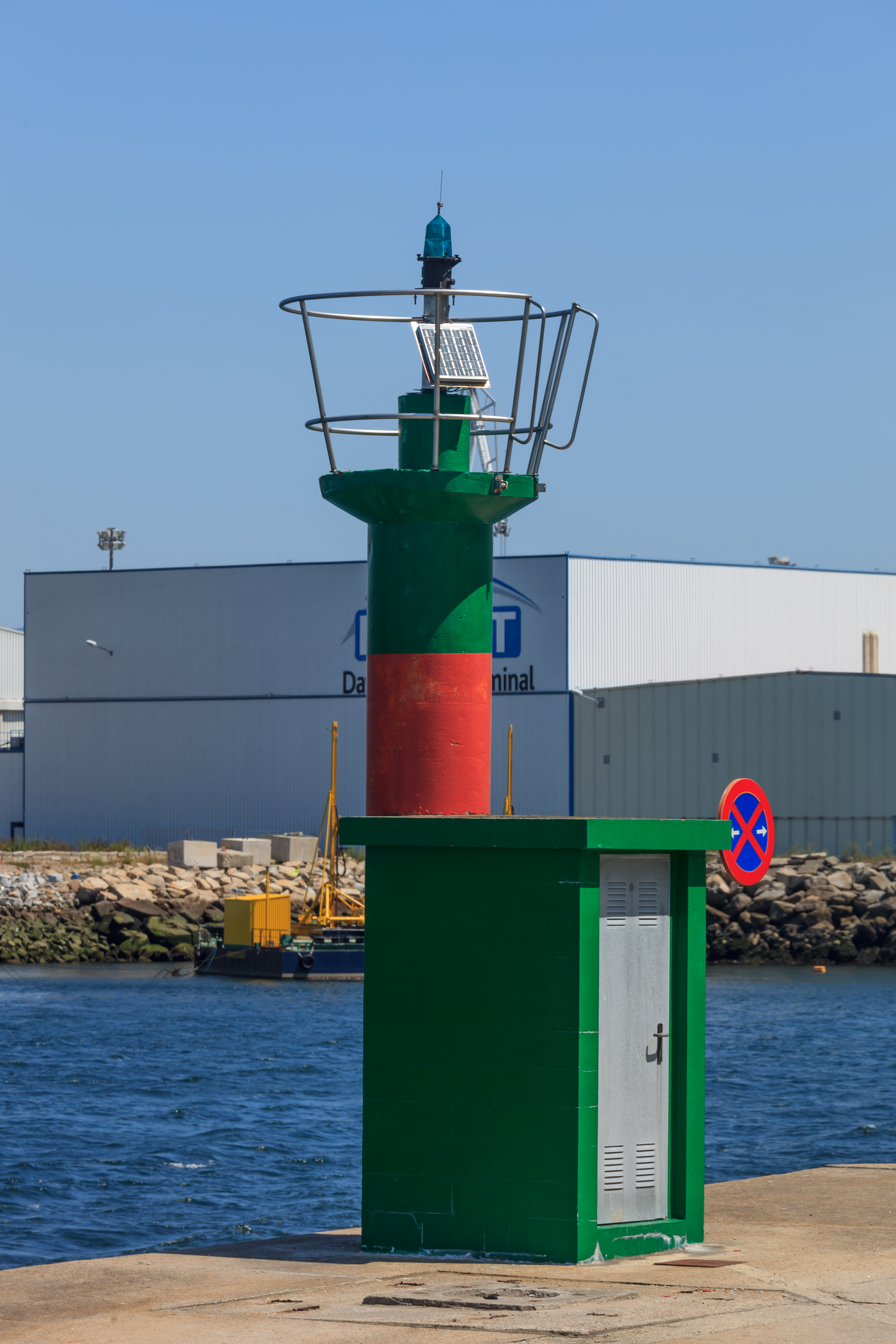

== See also ==
=== Related articles ===
- Ria de Pontevedra
- List of ports in Spain
- Marín
- Pontevedra

=== External links ===
- Port of Marín. "Port of Marín and Ria de Pontevedra" (in Spanish).
