= Port of Tarifa =

Coordinates: 36°0′6″N 5°36′30″W

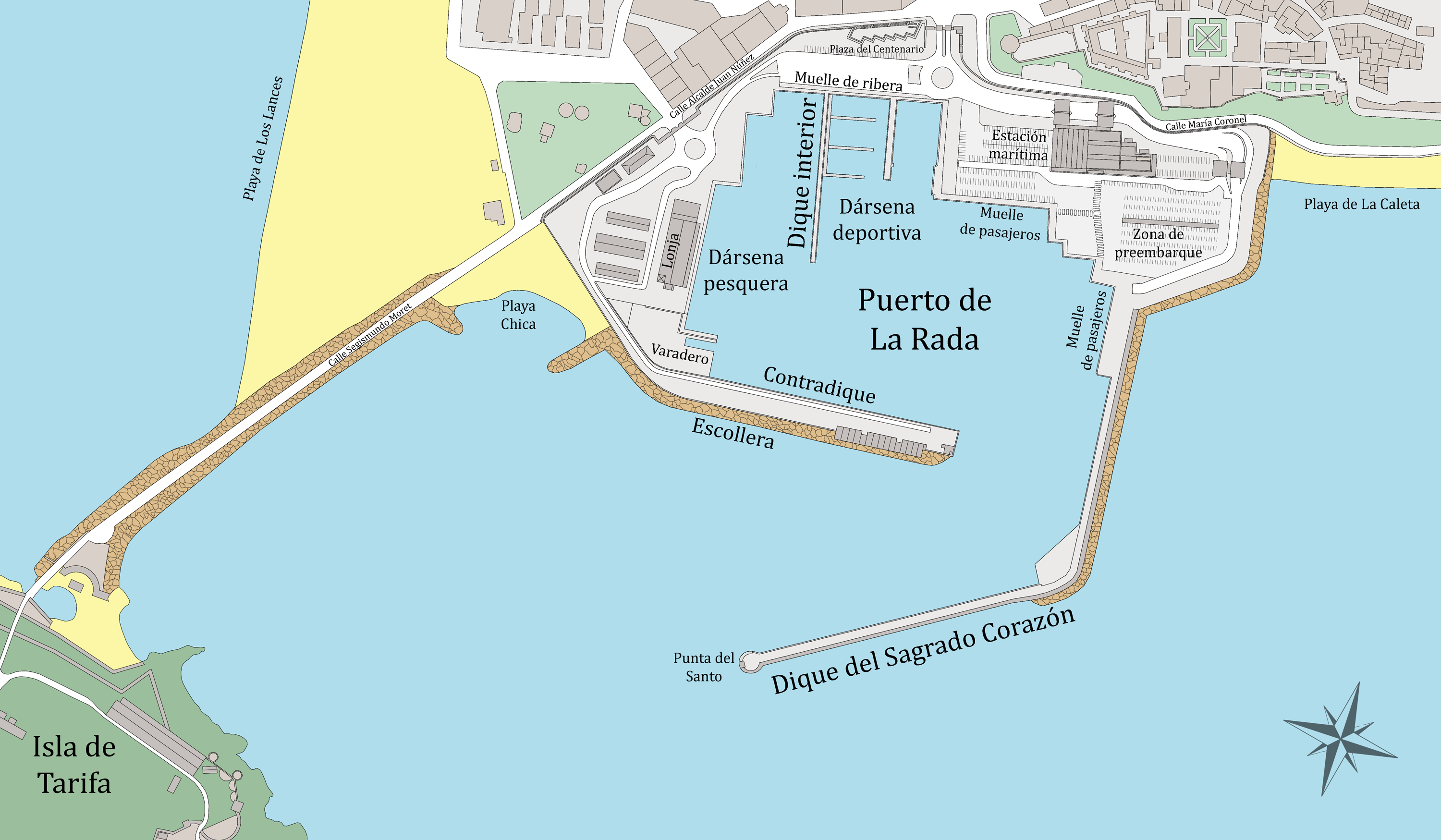
Port of Tarifa

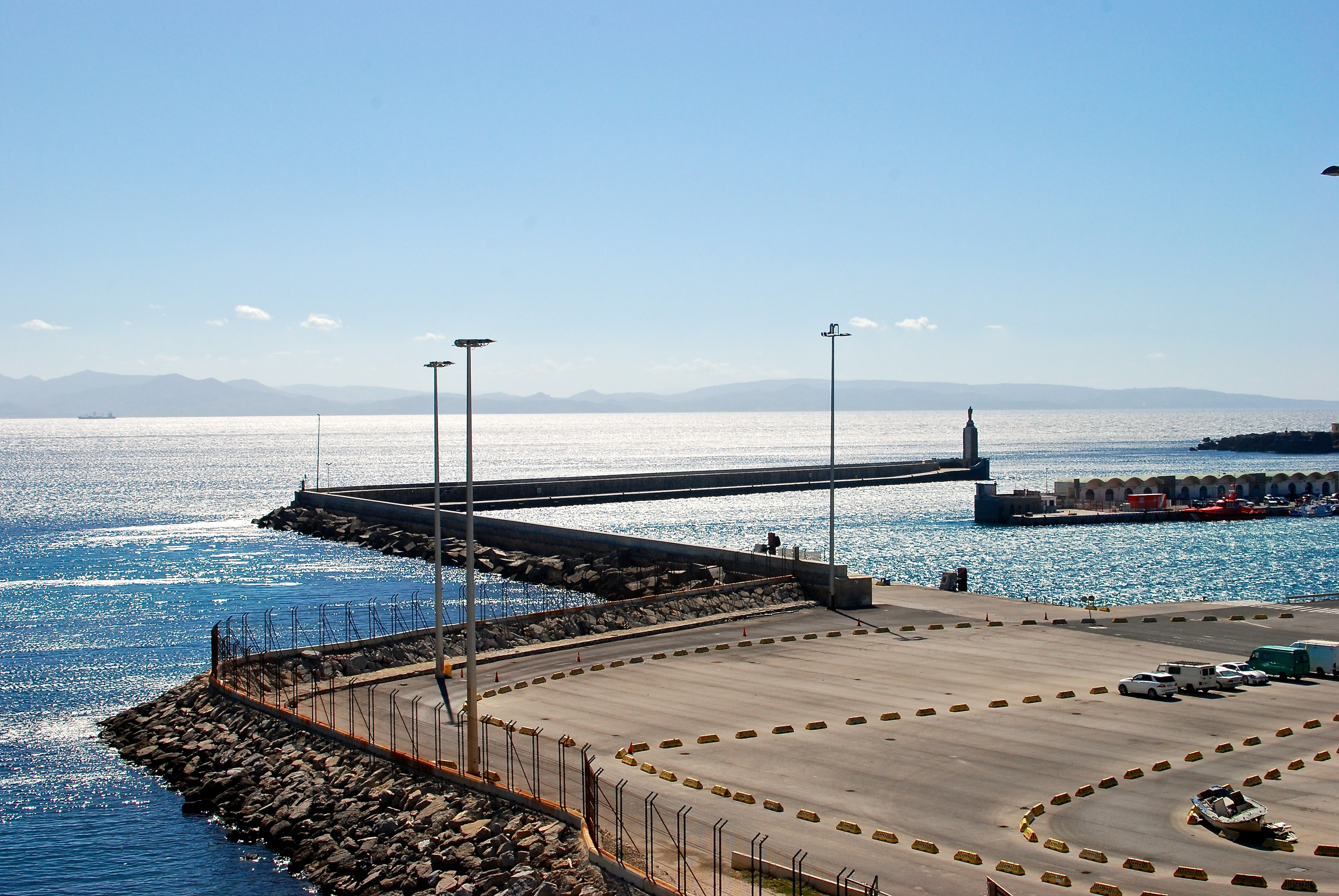
Port of Tarifa

The Port of Tarifa (Spanish: Puerto de Tarifa) is a commercial harbor for fishing and passenger boats, located in the Andalusian town of Tarifa. It is managed by the Port Authority of Algeciras (ABPA) and is the closest European port to North Africa and on the main shipping route to Tangier in Morocco and Ceuta. It is recognized as a Schengen border crossing point.

== History ==
In May 429 A.D. the port was the gathering point of Geiseric and his Vandal army as they made their way to plunder in Africa.

In 1811, during the Peninsular War, British forces created a garrison at the port and successfully defended it from French forces.

In 2024, six autonomous reef-monitoring structures (ARMS) were placed in the port by departments of the University of Cádiz and the Regional Government of Andalusia, with collaboration from ABPA, in order to study the Strait of Gibraltar's biodiversity and detect the arrival of invasive species.

== Ferry services ==
Ferry routes are operated year-round between Tarifa and Tangier. The crossing usually takes one hour, and there are up to 17 crossings every day. The services were suspended during the COVID-19 pandemic and resumed in April 2022.

In 2025, the ferry operator Baleària announced that it would operate two electric ferries on the route, creating a sustainable transport corridor between Spain and Morocco.

== Port facilities ==
The port is split into three different areas. The ferry port is open only to passengers and has a parking lot and a terminal building with ticketing offices, toilets, customs offices, and a café. The port also has a fishing port and a marina.
