= Port of Los Cristianos =

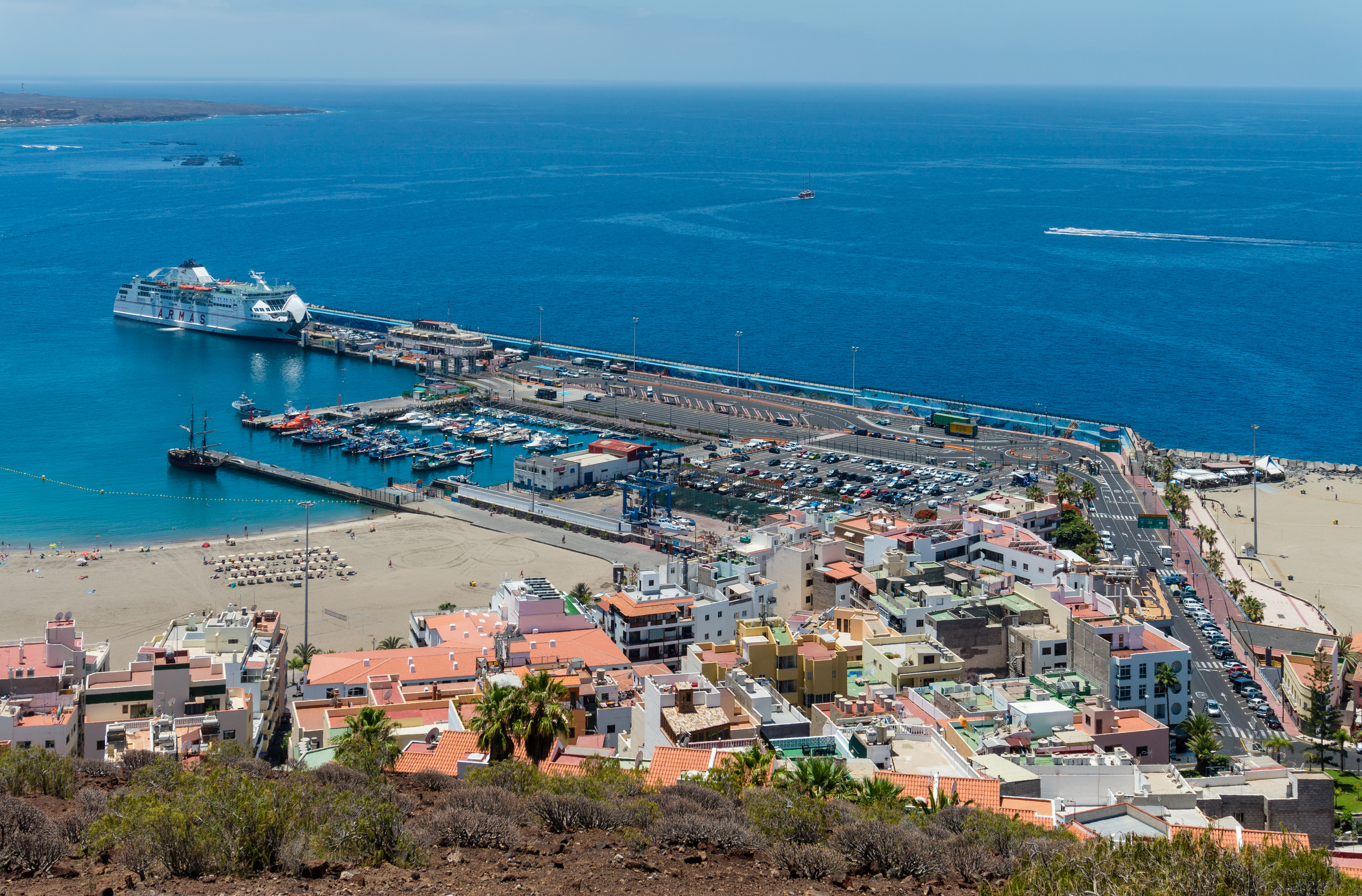
- Port of Los Cristianos
- Interactive map of Port of Los Cristianos
- Location in Africa

Location
- Location: Spain
- Coordinates: 28°02′55″N 16°43′09″W

The Port of Los Cristianos is a port of the Atlantic Ocean located in the town of Los Cristianos, in the municipality of Arona on the island of Tenerife (Canary Islands, Spain). It is administered by the Port Authority of Santa Cruz de Tenerife. It is the port with the highest passenger and vehicle traffic in the Canary Islands, in 2007 it had 1,829,579 passengers, and 238,836 vehicles.

The port area of Los Cristianos also occupies the first place in Spain in terms of passenger traffic thanks to its links with the ports of San Sebastián de La Gomera, La Estaca in El Hierro and Santa Cruz de La Palma.
