= Port Authority of Valencia =

The Port Authority of Valencia (PAV), which trades under the name of Valenciaport, is the public body responsible for running and managing three state-owned ports along an 80 km stretch of the Mediterranean coast in Eastern Spain: Valencia, Sagunto and Gandia.

- Port of Valencia: specialises in container traffic, vehicles and cruises.
- Port of Sagunto: specialises in traffic in bulk goods, cars, steel, short sea shipping container traffic and roll on/roll off (ro-ro) traffic.
- Port of Gandia: specialises in general cargo traffic like paper reels and pulp, imported wood and local agricultural produce.

The PAV depends on the public organisation Puertos del Estado of the Ministry of Development. Its operation is governed by Law 27/1192 of November 24, State Ports and Merchant Marine, modified by Law 62/97 December 26, State Ports and Merchant Marine and Law 48/2003 of November 26 of Economic regime and Services Media Ports of General Interest that has been modified in turn by Law 33/2010 of August 5, which establishes: the PAV's role and functions as assigned by law and the PAV's organisational structure.

== Traffic ==
Valenciaport is the main Port of Spain and the Mediterranean in traffic container. In 2016, the 3 ports managed by the PAV (Valencia, Sagunt and Gandia) handled 4.72 million containers (TEUs).

== Connectivity ==
Over than 130 regular lines run by shipping companies connect Valenciaport to over 1000 ports on all five continents.
