= Battle of Santander =

1937 battle of the Spanish Civil War

Coordinates: 43.4500°N 3.8000°W

- Part of the Spanish Civil War
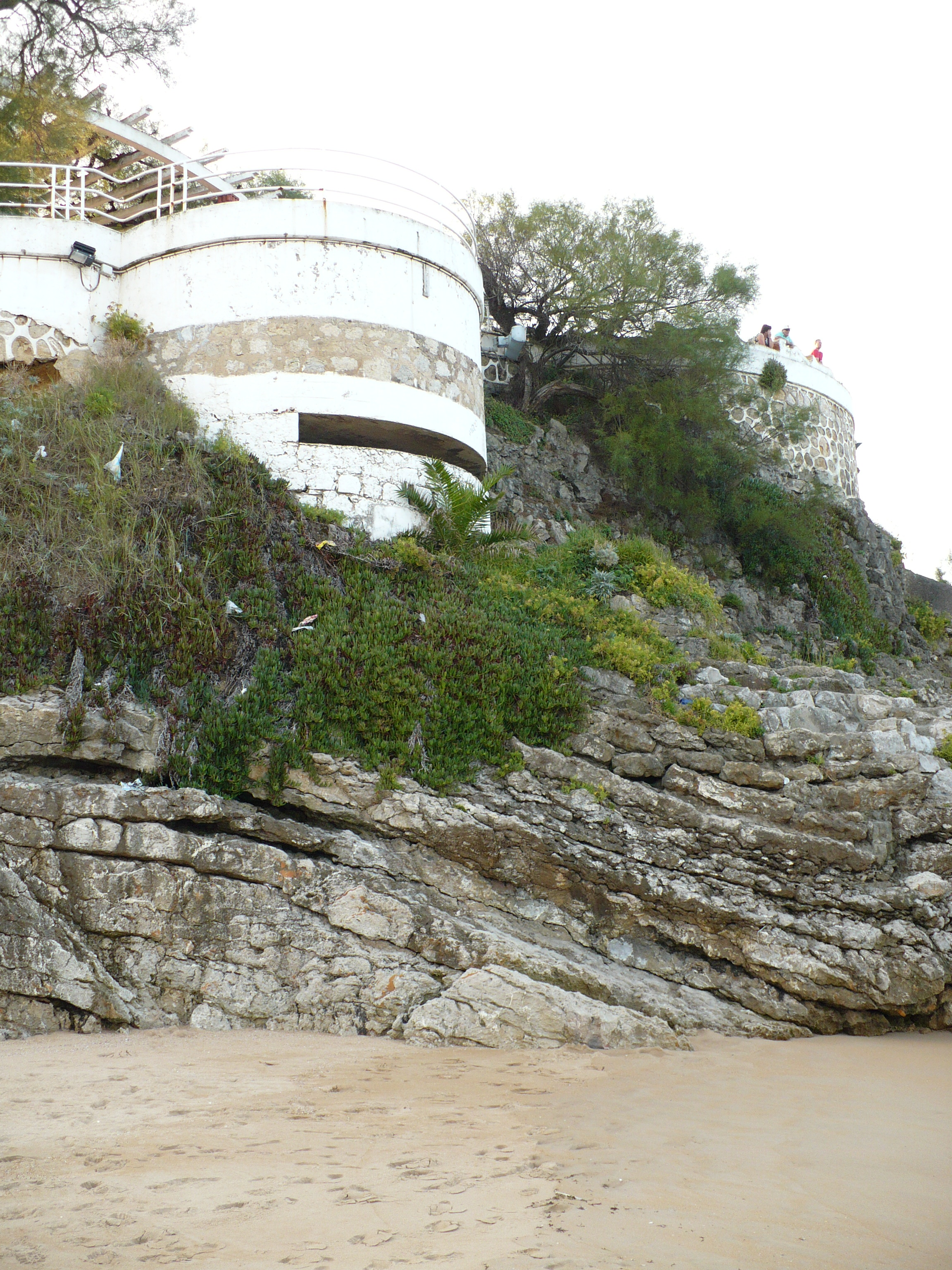
- Machine gun nest in Santander
| Date | 14 August – 17 September 1937 |
| Location | Santander province, north of Palencia and Burgos provinces, Spain |
| Result | Nationalist victory |

Belligerents
| Republicans: 14th Army Corps (surrendered); 15th Army Corps; Isaac Puente Battalion | Nationalists; CTV; Condor Legion |

Commanders and leaders
| (Second Spanish Republic) Mariano Gamir (Second Spanish Republic) Adolfo Prada; Antonio Teresa Miguel | (Francoist Spain) Fidel Dávila Arrondo (Francoist Spain) José Solchaga (Fascist Italy) Ettore Bastico; Hugo Sperrle |

Strength
| 80,000; 50 artillery batteries 44 aircraft | 90,000 (25,000 Italians); 126 guns 220 aircraft |

Casualties and losses
| 60,000 captured | Nationalist: 30,000 casualties Italian: 486 killed 1,546 wounded 1 missing German: 309 killed 900 wounded |

The Battle of Santander was fought in the War in the North campaign of the Spanish Civil War during the summer of 1937 and saw the victory of Italian and Nationalist forces against the Republicans. Santander's fall on 26 August assured the Nationalist conquest of the province of Santander, now Cantabria. The battle devastated the Republic's "Army of the North"; 60,000 soldiers were captured, among them the Basque forces which surrendered to the Italians on August 25.

== Background ==
The Battle of Santander comes in the aftermath of another failure on the part of the Republicans. On 19 June 1937, after exactly one week of fighting, the Battle of Bilbao result in the Nationalists gaining total control over the Bay of Biscay. Despite that victory, Republicans continued to put up a fight in Cantabria. Prior to its capture by Nationalist forces, the coast of Santander was patrolled by Nationalist ships and the city was put under blockade.

== Opposing forces ==
The Nationalists' Army of the North had 90,000 men (of which, 25,000 Italian), led by general Dávila. The Italian force, led by General Bastico, comprised Bergonzoli's Littorio Division, Frusci's Black Flames Division and Francischi's 23 March Division. The Nationalists had also six Brigades of Navarre led by Colonel Solchaga, two Castilian brigades led by General Ferrer, and one mixed Hispano-Italian division, the Black Arrows, led by Colonel Piazzioni. The Nationalists had also 220 modern aircraft on this front (70 of the Condor Legion, 80 of the Aviazione Legionaria and 70 Spanish), including many Bf 109 fighters.

Opposing them, the Republicans had Prada's 14th Army Corps and José García Vayas's 15th Army Corps, under the overall command of General Mariano Gámir Ulíbarri; a total of about 80,000 men. The Republicans had also 44 aircraft (mostly slow and old, except 18 Soviet-built fighters). Furthermore, the morale of the Republican troops was low, and Basque soldiers thought that they might surrender to the Italians, in return for their lives.

== Timeline ==
14 August

The Nationalist 1st Brigade of Navarre attacks the front between Valdecebollas (Palencia) and Cuesta Labra, trying to cut off the Republican forces south of the Cantabrian Mountains.

15 August

The Nationalists advance in the area of Barruelo (Palencia) up to Peña Rubia, Salcedillo, Matalejos and Reinosilla; the Republic's fight back at Portillo de Suano.

16 August

The Nationalists overcome the Republicans at Portillo de Suano and take the factories near Reinosa (Cantabria); they enter Reinosa itself at nightfall. The 4th Brigade of Navarre advances at the River Saja valley towards Cabuérniga Valley (Cantabria). Italian forces advance from Burgos to Lanchares and San Miguel de Aguayo (Cantabria).

17 August

Italian forces take El Escudo Pass and join the rest of the forces at San Miguel de Aguayo. 22 Republican battalions are encircled at Campoo (Cantabria).

18 August

Nationalist forces take Santiurde, and Italian forces take San Pedro del Romeral and San Miguel de Luena (Cantabria).

19 August

Nationalist forces advance in Cabuérniga and the Pas River valley, taking Bárcena de Pie de Concha and Entrambasmestas (Cantabria).

20 August

Italian forces advance towards Villacarriedo and Navarrese forces advance towards Torrelavega and Cabezón de la Sal.

22 August

The Nationalist take Selaya, Villacarriedo, Ontaneda and Las Fraguas (Cantabria).

23 August

Navarrese forces enter Mazcuerras Valley and take Mount Ibio, nearly cutting the main road and railway between Santander and Asturias. Italian forces face Republican resistance near Puente Viesgo (Cantabria).

24 August

General Gámir-Ulibarri orders the general evacuation towards Asturias. The Nationalist take Torrelavega and Barreda, cutting the main road to Asturias. The Basque forces, after defeating the front, sign the Santoña Agreement (Spanish Pacto de Santoña) by which they surrender to the Italians.

25 August

The main Republican authorities leave Santander, heading to Gijón (Asturias).

26 August

Nationalist forces enter Santander around noon; 17,000 Republicans are made prisoners. There was a spate of executions of captured Republicans following the battle, with Adam Hoschild accounting for at least 1267 people executed following quick trials, 739 people executed without trial, and 389 dying of maltreatment in captivity in the weeks after the battle.

1 September

The Nationalists take Unquera (Cantabria), in the limit with Asturias.

17 September

Tresviso, the last Cantabrian territory in Republican hands, falls to the rebels.

== Consequences ==
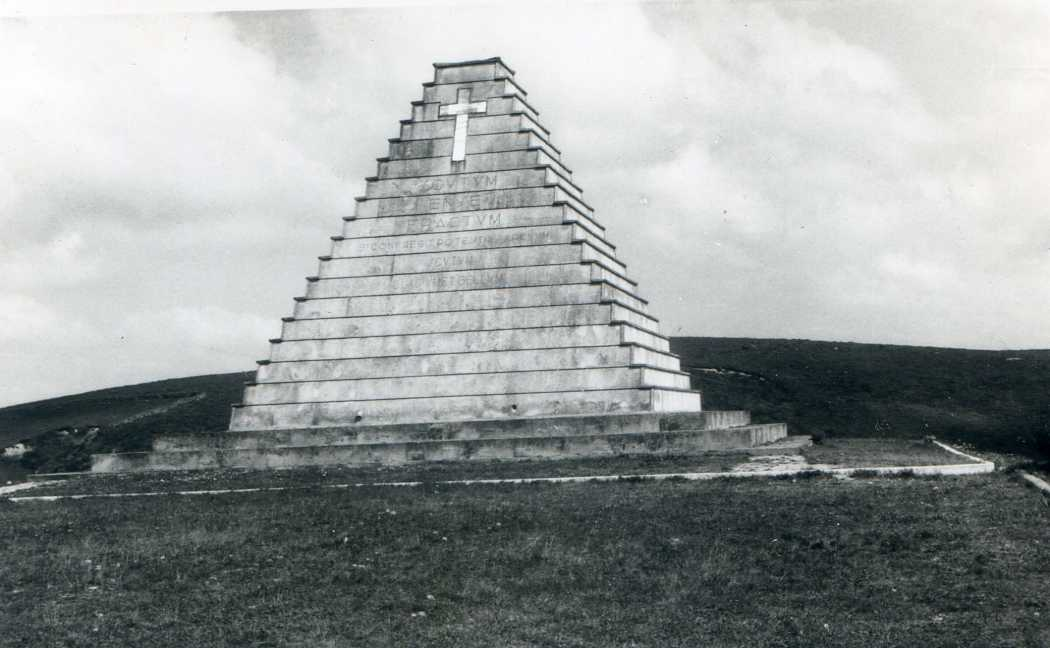
Mausoleum built in 1939 to contain the graves of the Italian fallen in the battle of Santander, known as "Italian pyramid".

Santander's fall, coupled with the capture of heavily fortified Bilbao, tore an irreparable gap in the Republic's northern front. The destruction of the Army of the North marked another crippling blow to the Republic's sagging strength and turned the war to Franco's favour. Factors accounting for the Republican defeat include:

- The overwhelming superiority in artillery and air power of the Italians and Nationalists.
- A lack of unified command among Asturian, Cantabrian, and Basque Republican units.
- The precision, shock, and rapidity of the Italian-Nationalist advance, which had as its objective the destruction of enemy forces and not the consolidation of territory.
- The defenders' poor morale, in contrast to the exceptional confidence and enthusiasm of the Nationalists.
- Mutinies and sedition by the Basque units in the Republican camp (Santoña Agreement).

The disaster proved total and the losses beyond repair. Of the twelve Basque brigades there remained at the end only eight battered battalions. The Republican Army of Santander of twelve brigades was reduced to six battalions. The Asturians committed 27 battalions and escaped with only fourteen. In no other theatre of the civil war did Franco's troops achieve results as decisive as those of the Santander campaign: sixty thousand Republican soldiers were wiped off the map, with corresponding losses in materiel. The War in the North was all but won.

== See also ==
- List of Spanish Nationalist military equipment of the Spanish Civil War
- List of weapons of the Corpo Truppe Volontarie
- Condor Legion
- List of Spanish Republican military equipment of the Spanish Civil War
