= Valles Pasiegos =

Coordinates: 43°13′39″N 3°51′28″W

- Comarca
- Flag Coat of arms
- Country: Spain
- Autonomous community: Cantabria
- Province: Cantabria
- Capital: Villacarriedo
- Municipalities: List: Castañeda, Corvera de Toranzo, Luena, Puente Viesgo, San Pedro del Romeral, San Roque de Riomiera, Santa María de Cayón, Santiurde de Toranzo, Saro, Selaya, Vega de Pas, Villacarriedo, Villafufre

Area
  - Total: 599 km^{2} (231 sq mi)

Population
  - Total: 23,257
  - Density: 38.8/km^{2} (101/sq mi)
- Demonym(s): pasiego, -a
- Time zone: UTC+1 (CET)
  - Summer (DST): UTC+2 (CEST)

Valles Pasiegos is an administrative comarca in Cantabria, Spain. It is formed by the valleys of the Pas and Miera rivers, each one being a natural comarca of its own.

== History ==
In the whole valley, the repopulation allowed by the foundation of several monasteries had great importance. The most important were the San Vicente de Fístoles monastery and the Santa Cruz de Castañeda collegiate church. In addition to the monasteries, several romanesque temples were built during the 11th to 13th centuries, some of which still stand: the aforementioned Santa Cruz de Castañeda church, the Santa María de Cayón church, and the temple of San Miguel de Monte Carceña, among others. These buildings show the peak and the importance that this comarca had during those centuries.

From the 11th century on, a special, perhaps unique, human habitat began to form in the highest parts of these valleys. Its economy was based on ancient transhumant cattle breeding practices which may have been traditional to more extensive areas of Europe and the region, but which with time only survived in isolated places such as these valleys, and others elsewhere in Europe, and in Asia and Africa. The people of this habitat, who were named Pasiegans (Pasiegos) from the name of the valleys and the main river, settled mainly on the flanks of the hills of the Miera and Pas rivers. The settling was scattered, as they lived in wooden and later, stone huts (called "cabañas", cabins) which they occupied during the Spring and Summer, when the pastures were richer. For the Winter they collected enough hay to feed the cows and then moved down to the village longhouses (casas vividoras, living houses) in the valleys. The more stable population group that little by little was created along the valley-bottom roads in a street row pattern became the three Pasiegan villas: Vega de Pas, San Pedro del Romeral and San Roque de Riomiera, which are not contiguous.

The recorded data and legal documents of those early centuries show that they moved under monastic/royal patronage over an extensive territory in the transalpine region of Cantabria - with the Royal privilege of being freed from the payment of duties for Pasturing or Passage (local or feudal levies). The territory overlapped many of the internal counties of Cantabria. Those counties that became the main focus of their radiation were not contested by previously settled municipalities, as they covered land previously preserved for Royal Hunting grounds. These lands had been valued for their wilderness, which was described in the chronicles, and was rich in bears and other wild fauna.

Later documents, in particular a Royal Charter of 1206, gave precise jurisdiction of the valleys and prescribed their inhabitants as constituents of the Royal village of Espinosa de los Monteros ("Monteros" is the name of the Royal Household Guards of the Chamber).

A sense of aversion and hostility in the face of their privileges and free roaming style must have been held later by their more settled neighbors, who saw them as a distinctive element of different origin.

== Religious architecture ==
During the 16th and 17th centuries large convents or monasteries were founded, as El Soto and the Franciscan monastery of La Canal, as well as Baroque churches, built by artisans and artists of the comarca. In those centuries, emigration to the "Indies" was also very popular. The Indianos (Spaniards who went back to Spain after becoming rich in the Americas), at their return, built churches or contributed to the building of chapels, towers, or the acquisition of works of art for the Church. The best examples are in the Obra Pía chapel of Bárcena de Carriedo, founded by the Indiano Manuel Rodríguez, or the reconstruction of the San Miguel de Llerana church, which also added the sacristy and the greater altarpiece to the existing church. In the tower of the same church a museum has been fit out about the Indianos of Carriedo Valley.

== Municipalities ==
The comarca consists of thirteen municipalities, listed below with their areas and populations:

Name	Area (km^{2})	Population (2001)	Population (2011)	Population (2018)
Castañeda	19.2	1,549	2,524	2,809
Corvera de Toranzo	49.5	2,128	2,158	2,041
Luena	90.5	872	694	601
Puente Viesgo	36.1	2,326	2,869	2,868
San Pedro del Romeral	57.4	621	507	466
San Roque de Riomiera	35.7	482	423	370
Santa María de Cayón	48.2	6,355	9,076	9,060
Santiurde de Toranzo	36.8	1,640	1,596	1,823
Saro	17.8	528	507	512
Selaya	39.3	1,948	2,007	1,891
Vega de Pas	87.5	1,011	828	775
Villacarriedo	50.7	1,755	1,749	1,604
Villafufre	30.1	1,149	1,113	1,029

== Pas valley ==
The Pas-Pisueña valley is located in the autonomous community of Cantabria, and through it flow the Pas River and its main tributary, the Pisueña River, which joins the Pas in the township of Vargas, part of the municipality of Puente Viesgo.

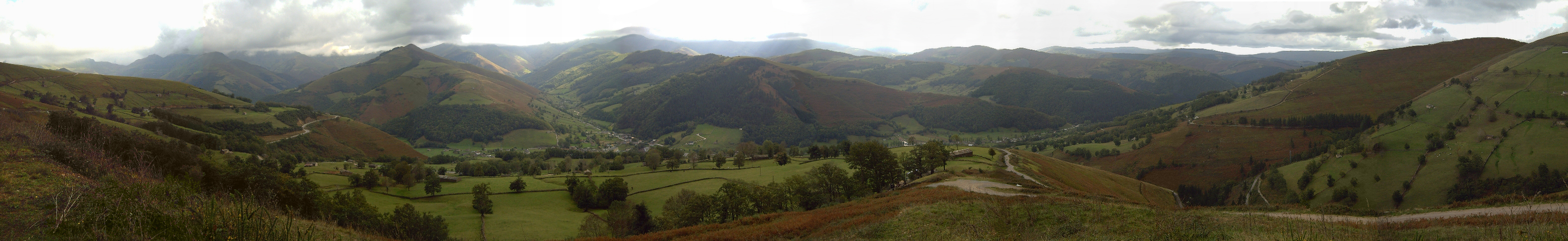
View of Vega de Pas

== Miera valley ==
The Miera valley is a natural valley located in the autonomous community of Cantabria, travelled by the Miera River. It is in itself a natural comarca, and the narrowest of the Cantabrian valleys. Its slopes are most noticeable and its peaks very high (Castro Valnera at 1,707 m over sea level).

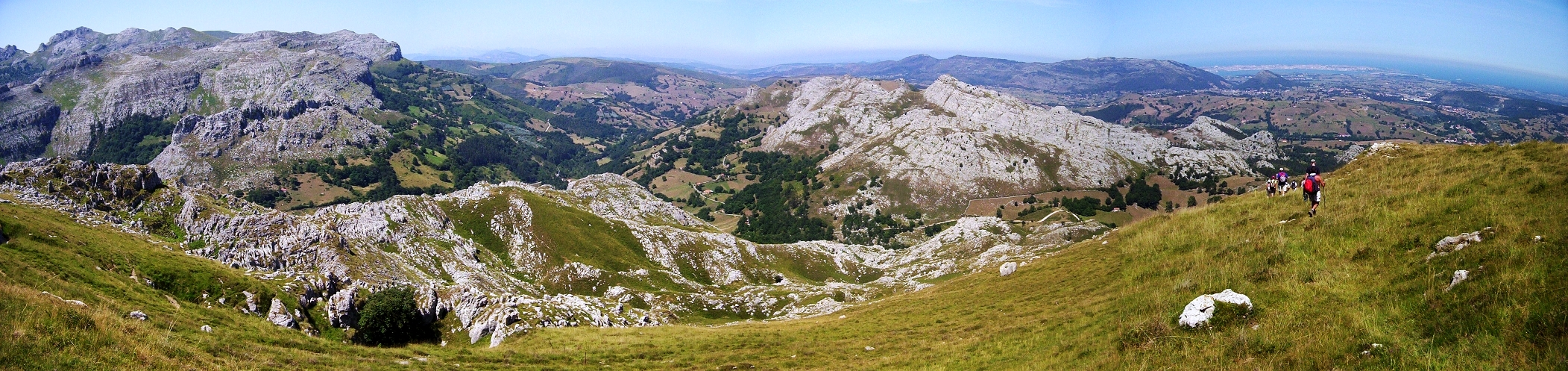
Panoramic view of the lower Miera valley from Somo de Brenas

The valley occupies partially or totally the municipalities of Soba, San Roque de Riomiera, Miera, Liérganes, Riotuerto, Medio Cudeyo and Ruesga (Calseca enclave).

In its morphology are remarkable the sandstones and limestones, and the vast deposits of debris originated by ancient moraines from glaciers in its highest part. It also features large karstic areas. Nevertheless, some of its glacial valley characteristics have been modified in some points by the torrential nature of the Miera River near its source.

The higher basin of the Miera has an abrupt relief, not suitable for the human habitat. In spite of that, caves with prehistoric settlements have been discovered in Piélagos, Rascaño and Salitre, one of the highest altitude (450 m over sea level) stations with Paleolithic art.

The medium valley of the Miera River, that mostly coincides with the municipality of Miera, is trapped between the abrupt karstic limestone pavements of Porracolina to the East, and Las Enguizas to the West, both belonging to the Urgonian Complex.

In both limestone blocks, important karstification phenomenons take place; there have been relevant explorations in these complexes and solved labyrinths in the caves of Alto del Tejuelo. Between them flows the Miera River, through the Escudo de Cabuérniga fault; with a diapir appearing from it between the villages of Linto and Miera and breaking the geologic continuity of the river course.

The chalky mountain mass of Las Enguizas sits directly over the silicon materials of the Early Cretaceous that make the hydrologic base of its four most important hydrologic systems and its cavities, partially studies in the case of El Cuevo de Noja-Fuente Fría and the Castrejón-Cubillo del Machorro network. They are structurally simpler systems than those of Porracolina, because the slope of the waterproof lower-cretaceous base has generated alignments perpendicular to the valleys axis.

In the lower course the most remarkable spots are the caves with prehistoric occupation: La Fuente del Francés (Hoznayo), La Garma (Omoño) and Los Moros (San Vitores). During the 16th century the economic life of this valley was focused around the lower course, towards Liérganes; years later in the 18th century a small industry had been established with the Royal Artillery Factory of La Cavada, which supplied weapons to the ships built in the Guarnizo and Colindres shipyards.

This zone gave many emigrants to Andalusia and the Indies. It is a cradle of many distinguished Indianos like Juan de la Cuesta Mercadillo, who was the builder of the La Rañada Palace in Liérganes; Ramón Pelayo de la Torriente (Marquis of Valdecilla), who developed many important constructions in the region and other points of Spain during the first third of the 20th century, mainly linked to education and public health.
