= Pasiega =

Spanish breed of dairy cattle

- Conservation status: FAO (2007): extinct; DAD-IS (2020): endangered
- Other names: Roja Pasiega
- Country of origin: Spain
- Distribution: Valles Pasiegos of Cantabria
- Standard: Consejería de Desarrollo Rural, Ganadería, Pesca y Biodiversidad, Cantabria (page 9723, in Spanish)
- Use: milk

Traits
- Weight: Male: 500 kg; Female: 335 kg
- Height: Male: 148 cm; Female: 133 cm
- Coat: red, varying from hazel to deep red
- Horn status: small horns in both sexes
- Cattle; Bos (primigenius) taurus

The Pasiega is a traditional Spanish breed of red dairy cattle from the autonomous community of Cantabria in northern Spain. It originated in the Valles Pasiegos in south-eastern Cantabria. The name derives from that of the Pas River, which flows through that region. Because of the colour of its coat it may also be known as the Roja Pasiega or Rojina.

The Pasiega was believed to be extinct until the late twentieth century, when a surviving group was identified. The breed was officially recognised in 2007. It is one of only two autochthonous Spanish breeds of dairy cattle, the other being the Menorquina of Menorca in the Balearic Islands.

== History ==
The Pasiega is a traditional dairy breed of Cantabria, and particularly of the area of the three principal towns of the Valles Pasiegos: San Pedro del Romeral, San Roque de Riomiera and Vega de Pas. Genetic studies have found it to be closely related to the Asturiana de la Montaña, Asturiana de los Valles, Rubia Gallega and Sayaguesa breeds of northern Spain, but not – despite the geographical proximity – to the other cattle breed of Cantabria, the Tudanca.

Pasiega cattle were traditionally managed under a type of short-range transhumance: in spring and summer they grazed on meadows on the slopes of the mountains of the Cordillera Cantábrica; in autumn they were brought down to the valleys, and grazed the fields which had been harvested; in winter they were stabled, and fed hay and maize meal. Shelter was provided for them throughout the year; these stone-built shelters are now of cultural significance.

In the nineteenth century, as urbanisation increased and the major Spanish cities grew larger, demand for milk increased. Many Pasiego farmers moved with their cattle to the cities to supply them with milk, and the Pasiega spread through much of the country. The quantity of milk that could be produced soon became more important than the fat content, and from about 1865 imports of specialised foreign dairy cattle began. At first these were Swiss Braunvieh; they were soon followed by Dutch Friesians. Cross-breeding of the Pasiega with these cattle caused a decline in breed numbers, to the point that by about 1940 the breed was considered extinct.

In the late twentieth century a small number of cattle of the original type were identified. A breed society, the Asociación de Criadores de Ganado Vacuno de la Agrupación Pasiega, was formed in 2006. The Pasiega was officially recognised in 2007, and a herd-book was established in 2009.

In 2018 the breed population was reported to be 598 head, including 403 breeding cows and 7 bulls; semen from a further 22 bulls was available for artificial insemination. In 2020 the Pasiega was reported to be endangered at local level.

== Characteristics ==
The Pasiega is fairly tall, but not heavily built. The head is short, with a broad forehead and a straight profile; the horns are small, yellowish at the base and darker towards the tips. The limbs are long and slender. The coat is red, varying from hazelnut-coloured to a deep rich red; skin at the natural openings may be dark or pale.

The cattle are hardy and rustic, well adapted to the harsh climate of the Montes del Pas and capable of foraging on steep or rough mountain terrain.

== Use ==
The Pasiega is kept for milk production; the milk is used to make local cheeses, or butter for the preparation of dishes such as sobaos pasiegos or quesadas pasiegas.
