= Los Machucos =

Mountain pass in the Cantabrian Mountains

Los Machucos / Colláu Espina
- Location within Spain
- Elevation: 921 m (3,022 ft)

Third Approach
- Location: Cantabria, Spain
- Range: Cantabrian Mountains
- Coordinates: 43°15′27″N 03°39′11″W

Los Machucos, o Colláu Espina, is a mountain pass in the easternmost sector of the Cantabrian Mountains, known as the Pas Mountains, in Cantabria, Spain.

It is located at 921 metres (3,022 ft) above sea level and communicates the villages of Bustablado and San Roque de Riomiera. It is known for its slopes between 15 and 20%, reaching 28% at certain points. At the summit, there is a Monument to the Pasiega cattle.

In cycling, it was climbed for the first time in the 2017 Vuelta a España, when it was used as the finish of stage 17. Los Machucos was also featured as a stage finish in the 2019 Vuelta a España.
