= Luena =

Luena may refer to:

== Places ==
- Luena, Angola
- Luena, Spain
- Luena (constituency), Limulunga District, Western Province, Zambia

== Other uses ==
- Luena Airport, Angola
- Luena Airport (Democratic Republic of the Congo)
- Luena people, or Luvale people, Angola
- Luena River (disambiguation)
- Luena Martinez (born 1999), British singer; former member of girl group RLY
