= Puerto del Escudo =

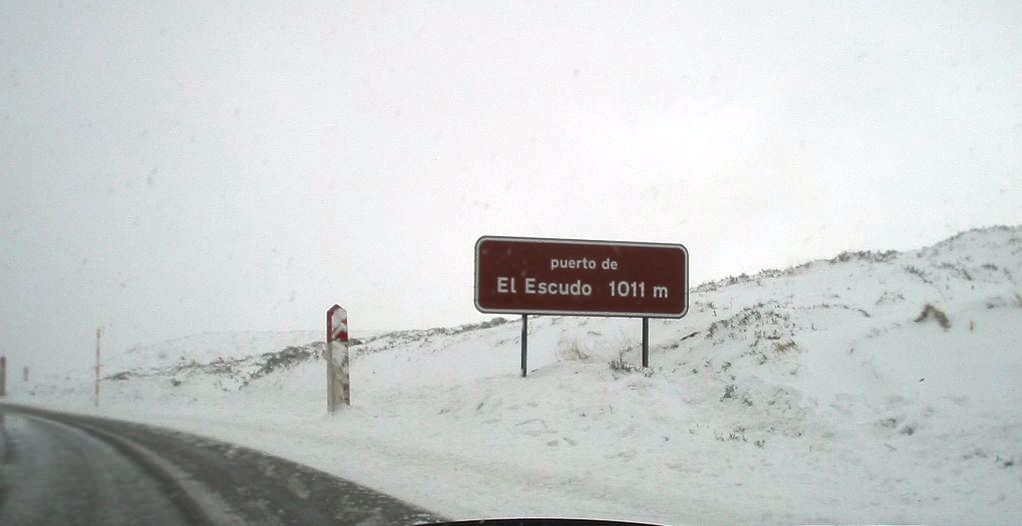

- Location within Spain
- Elevation: 1,011 metres (3,317 ft)

Third Approach
- Location: Cantabria and Castile and León, Spain
- Range: Cantabrian Mountains
- Coordinates: 43°02′32″N 3°52′42″W

The Puerto del Escudo (Pass of the Shield) is a mountain pass at 1,011 meters elevation located in the valley of Luena, to the east of the Sierra del Escudo mountain range and on the boundary between Cantabria and Castile (province of Burgos) in Spain. The source of the Magdalena or Luena River is located there. It has been one of the main access routes from the coast to the interior plateau crossing the Cantabrian Mountains. At the moment the N-623 highway runs over it and is well known for its steep inclines on its Cantabrian slope that can be up to 15%, causing a difficult transit for heavy vehicles. This characteristic and its altitude result in the relatively frequent closing of the pass when there is heavy snow in the winter.

During the Spanish Civil War, the pass was the site of a decisive battle between Republican forces (trying to hold the pass) and Italian forces (trying to dislodge them), part of the Battle of Santander. A pyramid-shaped tomb for the Italians killed in the battle still stands at the top of the pass, although their bodies were removed some years ago.

== See also ==
- List of highest paved roads in Europe
- List of mountain passes
