= Uslé =

Uslé is a surname. Notable people with the surname include:

- Juan Uslé (born 1954), Spanish painter
- Lorena Uslé (born 1994), Spanish badminton player
