= Laureano Ruiz =

Spanish footballer and manager

Personal information
- Full name: Laureano Ruiz Quevedo
- Date of birth: 21 October 1937 (age 89)
- Place of birth: Escobedo de Villafufre, Spain
- Position: Defender

Senior career*
| Years | Team | Apps | (Gls) |
| 1956–1962 | Racing Santander | | |
| 1962–1966 | Gimnástica | | |

Managerial career
- 1967–1968: Racing Santander
- 1971–1972: Langreo
- 1976: Barcelona
- 1976–1978: Barcelona B
- 1978–1979: Celta
- 1979–1980: Racing Santander
- * Club domestic league appearances and goals

Laureano Ruiz Quevedo (born 21 October 1937) is a Spanish retired football defender and manager.

== Football career ==
Born in Escobedo de Villafufre, Cantabria, Ruiz played for local Racing de Santander and Gimnástica de Torrelavega, ending his career at the age of 28 to become a full-time coach. At the age of 15 he had his first experiences as a manager, and often accumulated duties whilst still an active footballer; his first professional spell was with the former club in the 1967–68 season, being relegated from Segunda División.

In the following years, Ruiz worked extensively in youth football, being charged with FC Barcelona's cantera in the 70s/80s as well as the Generalitat of Catalonia's youth facilities. In the 1975–76 campaign he was in charge of the former's first team for six La Liga games, taking the place of German Hennes Weisweiler. He managed three wins – including one at the Santiago Bernabéu Stadium against Real Madrid on 30 April 1976 (2–0) – two draws and one loss during his spell, as the Catalans finished in second position; he was replaced by Rinus Michels in the summer, but continued working with the club.

Ruiz's other managerial stints with the professionals were with UP Langreo (1971–72, second level, relegation), FC Barcelona B (1976–77, division two, relegation) Celta de Vigo (1978–79, top flight, relegation) and former team Racing Santander (1979–80, second tier, 16th position).
