= Luena River =

Luena River (may also be spelt Lwena) may refer to

- Luena River, Angola in the east of the country, a tributary of the upper Zambezi
- Luena River, Western Zambia, a tributary of the Zambezi
- Luongo River (Luena-Luongo River) in the Luapula Province of Zambia
- Luena River, Bangweulu, a different river in the Luapula Province of Zambia, which flows into the western side of Lake Bangweulu, forming a wetland near its mouth and giving its name to a nearby mission.
- Luena River, Cantabria, a tributary of the Pas River in Cantabria, Northern Spain

== See also ==
- Luena (disambiguation)
