= Civera =

Civera is a surname. Notable people with the surname include:

- David Civera (born 1979), Spanish singer
- Mario Civera (born 1946), American politician
- Victoria Civera (born 1955), Spanish-born artist
