= Juan Uslé =

Spanish artist

- Born: Juan Uslé Oceja; December 19, 1954 (age 71); Santander, Spain
- Education: Real Academia de Bellas Artes de San Carlos de Valencia
- Known for: painting, abstraction
- Spouse: Victoria Civera
- Awards: Premio Nacional de Artes Plásticas (2002)

Juan Uslé Oceja (born 1954) is a Spanish contemporary painter. His work varies between abstraction and figurative representation. In 2002, he received the Premio Nacional de Artes Plásticas, a national arts prize awarded by the Ministerio de Cultura of Spain. He works both in New York City and in Saro in Cantabria.

== Early life and education ==
Uslé was born on December 19, 1954, in Santander, Cantabria, in northern Spain. He studied at the Real Academia de Bellas Artes de San Carlos de Valencia, in Valencia in eastern Spain, between 1973 and 1977. Uslé is married to artist Victoria Civera, who he has occasionally collaborated with in work. Together they have a daughter, Vicky Uslé (born 1981) who is also a painter.

Uslé moved to New York City with his family in 1987. He lives between New York City and Saro, Cantabria.

Uslé's first art exhibition in the United States was in 1988 at Farideh Cadot Gallery in New York City. Exhibitions of his work include Nudos Y Rizomas (2010), Es Baluard, Museu d'Art Modern i Contemporani de Palma, Mallorca; and Notes on Soñe que Revelabas (2019), Museu D'Art Contemporani d'Eivissa, Ibiza.
