= Tudanca cattle =

Spanish breed of cattle

Tudanca
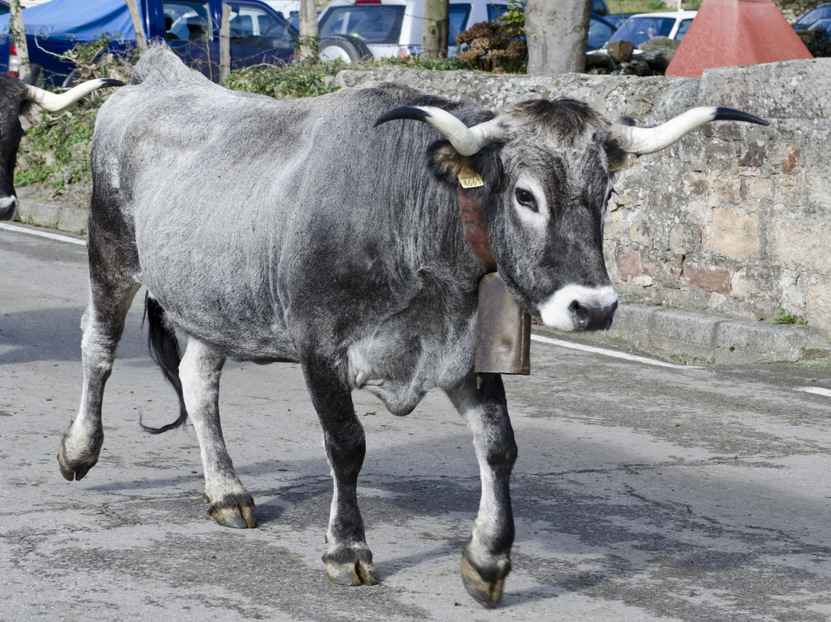
- Cow

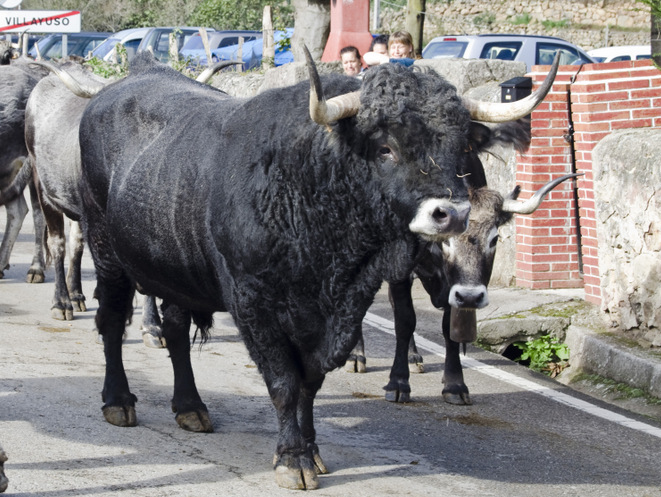
- Bull
- Conservation status: FAO (2007): not at risk; MAPA (2020): in danger of extinction; DAD-IS (2025): not at risk
- Other names: Cabuérniga
- Country of origin: Spain
- Distribution: Cantabria
- Use: formerly triple-purpose, now meat

Traits
- Weight: Male: 750 kg; Female: 600 kg
- Height: Male: 165 cm; Female: 160 cm
- Horn status: large horns in both sexes

The Tudanca is a traditional Spanish breed of cattle indigenous to the autonomous community of Cantabria, in northern Spain. It takes its name from the village of Tudanca in the comarca of Saja-Nansa in western Cantabria. In the past it was a triple-purpose breed, reared for meat and milk but particularly for draught work, and was much used for transport of goods to and from the ports of the Cantabrian coast. It is now reared for meat, but is still used in traditional sport of arrastre de piedra ('stone-dragging'). Despite its geographic proximity, it is not closely related to the other cattle breed of Cantabria, the Pasiega.

== History ==
The Tudanca is a traditional breed of Cantabria. In the 1870s prizes were offered at cattle fairs for winning examples of the Tudanca and Campóo breeds. The earliest monographic description is that of Santiago Enríquez, published in 1913.

In 1947 a meeting of breeders of the Tudanca was called by the Sindicato Nacional de Ganadería, the first of its kind, and in 1951 a breeders' committee was formed. At about this time several other Cantabrian breeds were merged into the Tudanca; these included the Campurriana from the southern comarca of Campóo, the smaller Lebaniega of the mountains of the comarca of Liébana in the west, and the Santander, whose status as a distinct breed remains dubious.

A breed standard was published by the Spanish ministry of agriculture in 1978 and a herd-book was established at the same time. The Tudanca was among the breeds included in the Catálogo Oficial de Razas de Ganado de España, the official catalogue of the livestock breeds of Spain, at its formation in 1979. A breed society, the Asociación Nacional de Criadores de Vacuno Selecto de Raza Tudanca, was formed either in 1978 or in 1980. In 1986 the association was authorised by the Ministerio de Agricultura, Pesca y Alimentación, the Spanish ministry of agriculture, to administer the herd-book.

The cattle were formerly numerous in Cantabria; a census in 1947 found approximately 80000 head. Numbers declined sharply in the second half of the twentieth century for a number of reasons, among them: the increasing mechanisation of agriculture and transport; a decline in the port haulage trade which been important to the Tudanca; a reduction in the extent of mountain pasture available to the cattle; and the effects of cross-breeding with imported cattle of specialised breeds. Between 1999 and 2008 the total number of the cattle rose by about 30%, from just under 10000 to just under 13000. In 2023 the total population numbered 13054 head in 439 herds; of these cattle, 12438 – or just over 95% – were in Cantabria, with the remainder in Castilla y León. The breeding stock consisted of 9402 cows and 227 active bulls. The Tudanca is classified in the Catálogo Oficial de Razas de Ganado de España among the autochthonous breeds in danger of extinction.

== Characteristics ==
The Tudanca is large but not heavily built. Average body weights are approximately 500 kg for cows and 750 kg for bulls, with average heights at the withers of about 160 cm and 165 cm respectively. These values are substantially higher than those listed in the breed standard of 1978, in which heights at the withers are given as 131 and 134 cm for cows and bulls respectively, with corresponding live body weights of 330 and 540 kg.

Calves are always born wheaten, but change colour at about three months old. Cows may be of any of three colours: hosca, grey; tasuga, pale blue-grey; or reddish blonde. Bulls are black with a white dorsal stripe. The muzzle is ringed with white in both sexes, and there may also be white surrounding the eyes. The horns are large and spreading, oval in section, and pale-coloured with black tips.

== Use ==
The Tudance was in the past a triple-purpose breed, reared for meat and milk but particularly for draught work. It was much used for transport of goods to and from the ports of the Cantabrian coast. In the twenty-first century it is reared principally for meat, but is still used in traditional sport of arrastre de piedra ('stone-dragging').

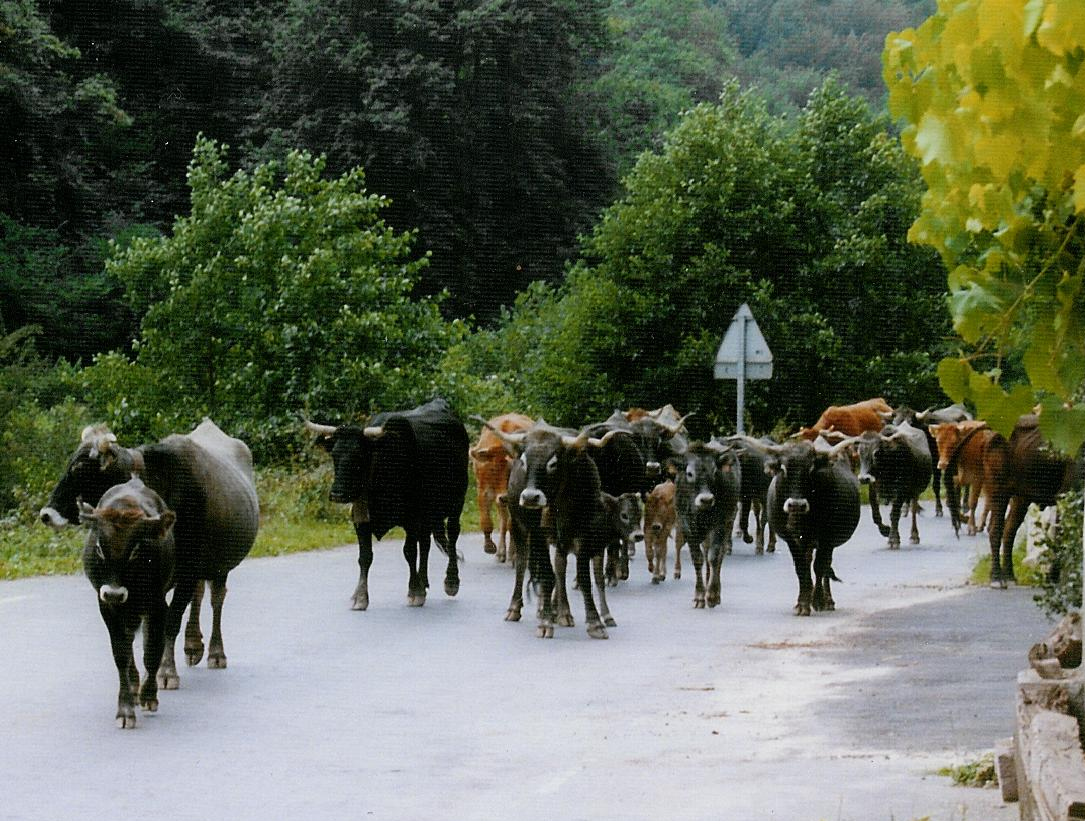
Herd showing various coat colours

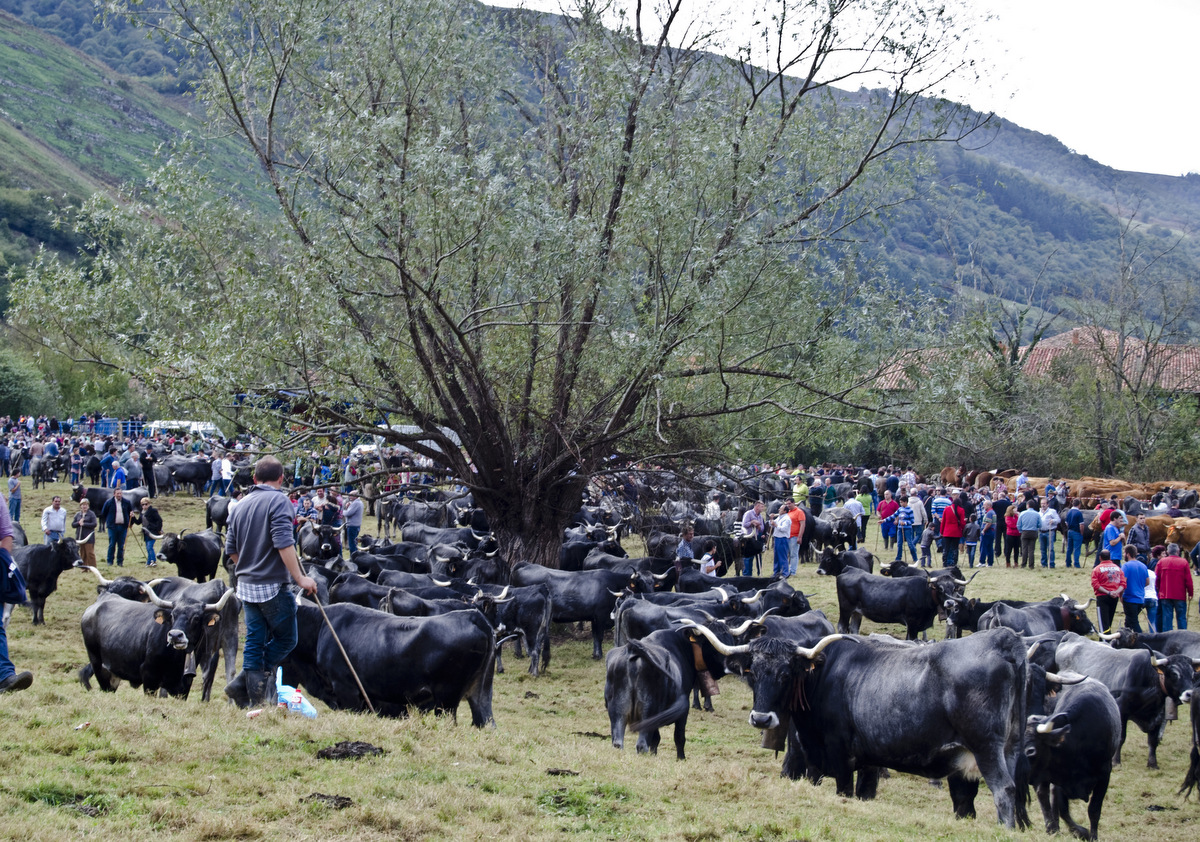
Cattle fair in Villayuso de Cieza, 2013

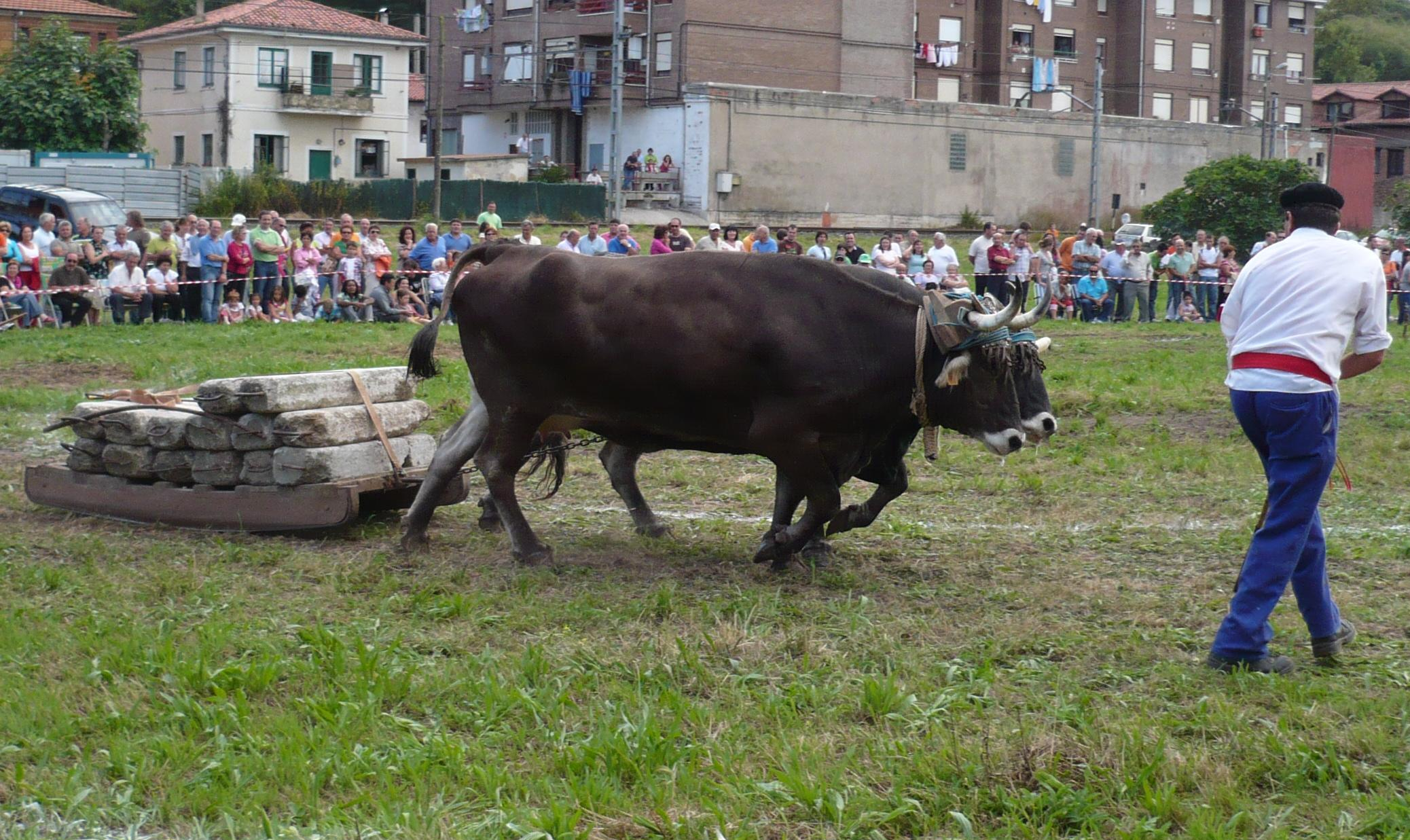
Arrastre de piedra contest in Puente San Miguel

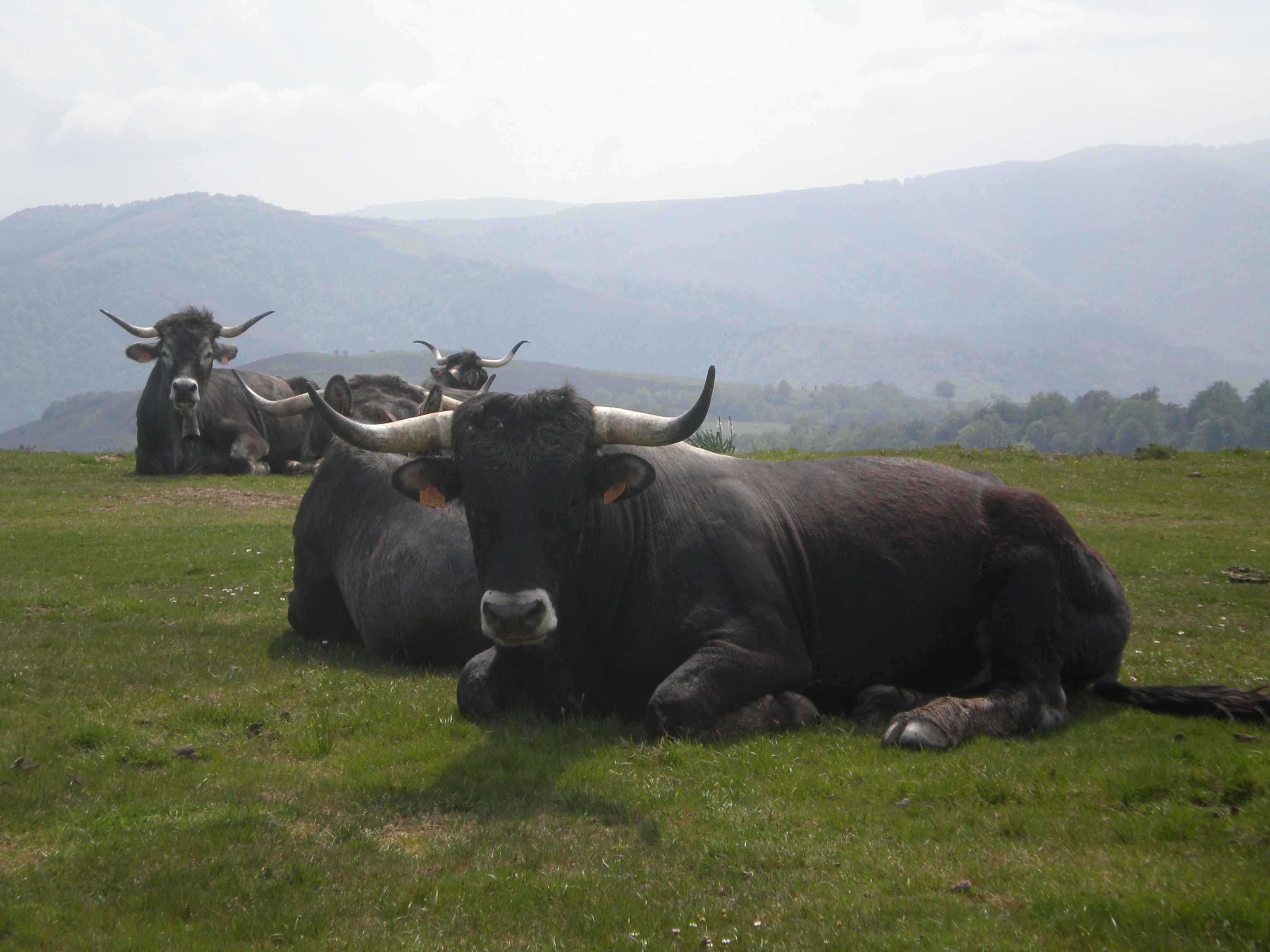
Bull and cows at Pico Mozagro
