= Bovine sports =

Sports that involve cattle

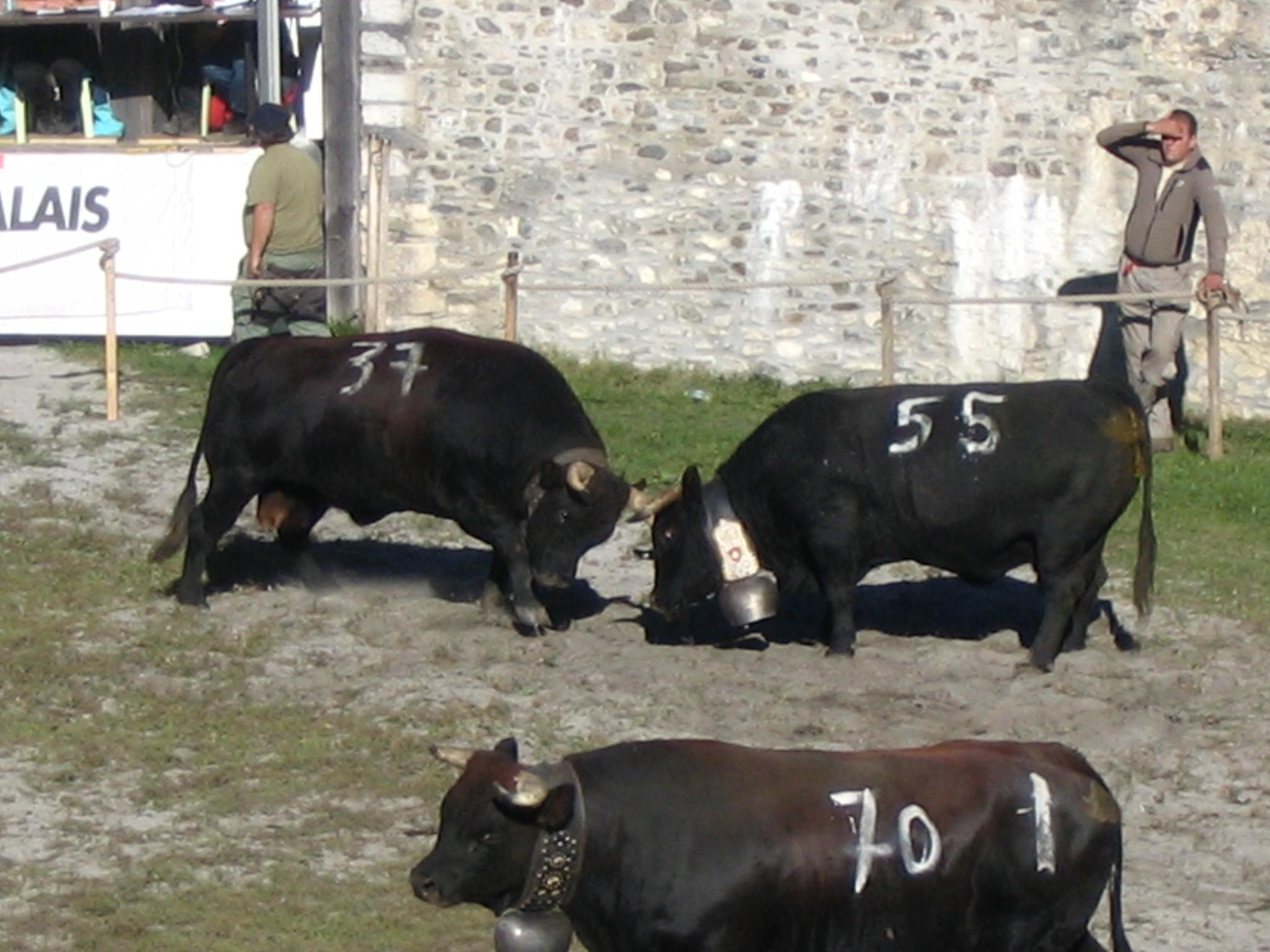
A cow fight in the amphitheatre in Martigny, Switzerland.

Bovine sports are sports that involve cattle, commonly a bull, ox, steer, cow or calf.

== American rodeo ==
American rodeo is a sporting event that consists of different events that involve cattle and horses, designed to test the skill and speed of the cowboy or cowgirl such as bull riding and team roping.

== Asian water buffalo festivals ==
In Southeast Asia, water buffalo racing or fighting is a feature during various festivals in Vietnam, Thailand, Malaysia, Cambodia and Assam.

== Basque oxen trials ==
The idi probak (Basque for "oxen tests") is the most popular form of the Basque dragging games. It involves oxen, usually a pair, dragging a rock from one side of a square to another.

== Bovine bingo ==
Bovine bingo is usually a fundraising event where a bovine is placed in a clean pen taped off with labeled squares. People bet on which square the animal will defecate in, and the winner(s) who select the correct square(s) collect the prize money or other awards. This is generally used as a small-scale fundraiser or novelty event at agricultural fairs and similar places.

== Bullfighting ==
Bullfighting is a traditional sport in Spain, Portugal, some cities of southern France, and several Latin American countries.

== Bull-leaping ==
Bull-leaping is an ancient sport depicted in Bronze Age art. It is often interpreted as a ritual performed in connection with bull worship and consists of acrobatic leaps over a bull.

== Cantabrian bovine dragging ==
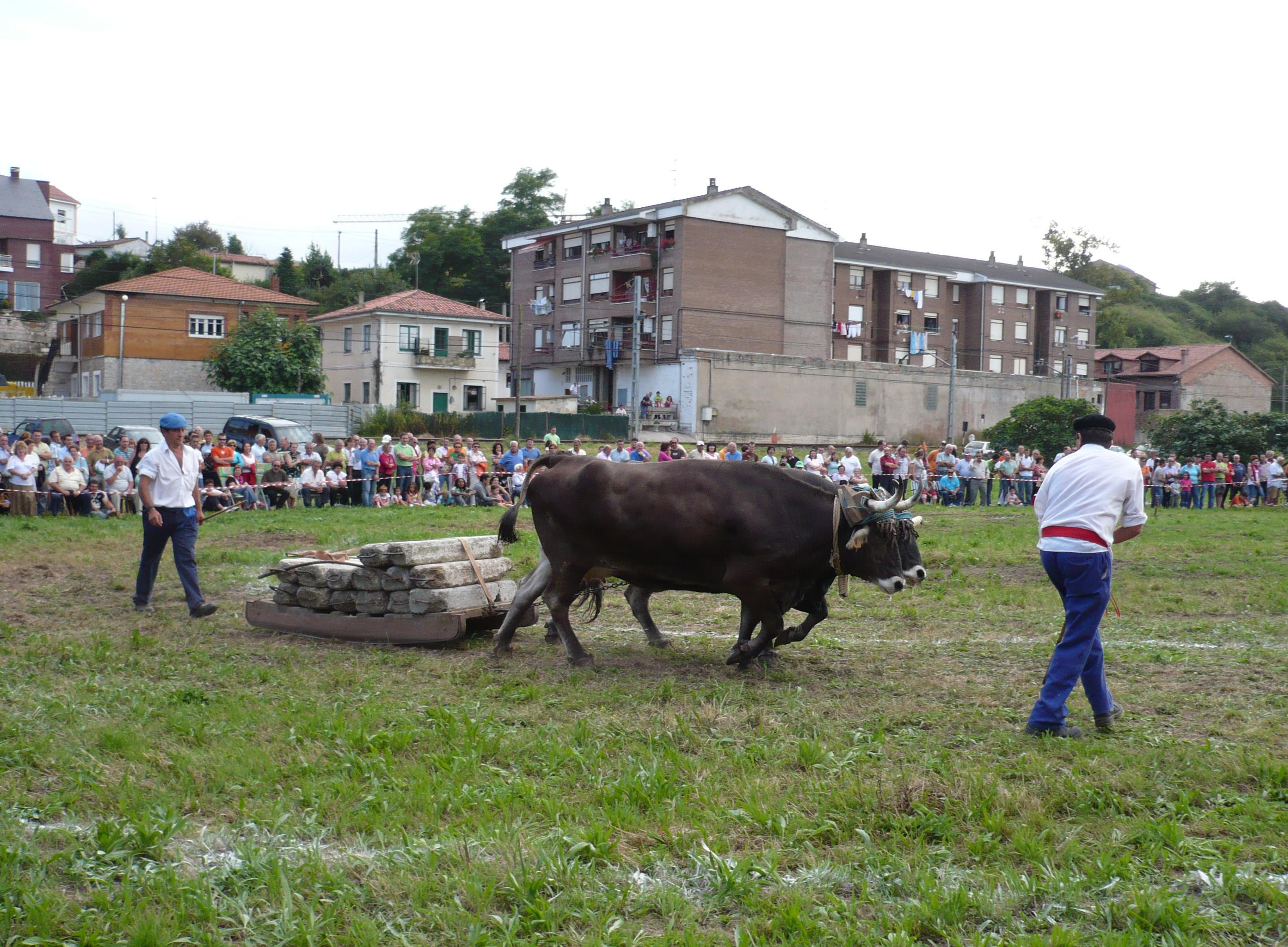
Tudanca cows in a dragging competition in Cantabria, northern Spain.

The concurso de arrastre (Spanish for "dragging test") is a pulling game where oxen or cows drag a weight. It is also known as tiru güeis, tira bueis (Cantabrian for "oxen pulling"), arrastre de narras, arrastre de basnas ("sleigh dragging"), arrastre de piedra ("stone dragging") or simply arrastre ("dragging").

== Chilean rodeo ==
Chilean rodeo has been the national sport of Chile since 1962. It is different from the rodeo found in North America. In Chilean rodeo, a team consisting of two riders and two horses ride laps around an arena trying to stop a calf, pinning him against massive cushions.

== Okinawan bullfighting ==
Tōgyū is a spectator sport native to the Ryukyu Islands of Japan, especially in the Okinawa Prefecture. In Tōgyū, two bulls fight each other.

== Indian rodeo ==
Indian rodeo is a rodeo subculture of Native American/First Nations rodeo performers

== Swiss cow fighting ==
Swiss cow fighting involves contests between cows.

== Tamil bull baiting ==
In Jallikattu, one or more bulls are let loose in an open space. Bare handed participants then try to wrestle the bull by its horns.
