= Menorquina cattle =

Spanish breed of cattle

Menorquina
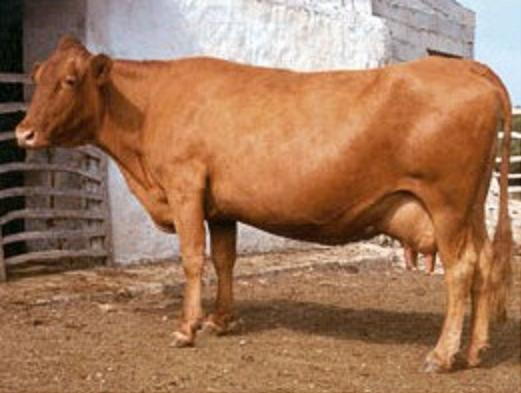
- Menorquina cow
- Conservation status: FAO (2007): endangered-maintained; DAD-IS (2025): at risk/endangered-maintained
- Other names: Maonesa; Vermella
- Country of origin: Spain
- Distribution: Menorca, Balearic Islands
- Standard: Conselleria d'Agricultura i Pesca (in Catalan)
- Use: dairy

Traits
- Weight: Male: 700–800 kg; Female: 400–450 kg
- Coat: red
- Horn status: hornless
- Cattle; Bos (primigenius) taurus

The Menorquina is an endangered Spanish breed of dairy cattle from the Mediterranean island of Menorca, in the Spanish autonomous community of the Balearic Islands. It belongs to the group of convex-profiled red cattle, whose distribution across the northern Mediterranean region is thought to have followed the path of the Bell-Beaker Culture. It is one of only two autochthonous Spanish breeds of dairy cattle, the other being the Pasiega. The milk is particularly suitable for cheese production, and is used to make Mahón cheese, which has DOP status.

== History ==
Cattle have been present in the Balearic Islands since the time of the Bell-Beaker Culture. Perforated beakers of this period found on the island of Mallorca are believed to be cheese-strainers. In Menorca, where there is no Bell-Beaker pottery, the presence of cattle is documented from the Talaiotic Culture of the first millennium BC, both by cattle bones excavated from talaiots such as those of Torre d'en Galmés and Trepucó, and by artefacts such as the bronze statuette of a calf found at the taula of Torralba d'en Salord in 1980.

The Menorquina was the only cattle breed on Menorca. When importations of modern specialised dairy cattle began in the twentieth century, it was rapidly displaced by these and numbers fell sharply. The survival of the breed is largely due to the efforts of a local vet, Gabriel Seguí, who in the 1940s brought together the remaining stock on his estates.

In 1991 the population was reported to be 184 head. The Menorquina was classified among the breeds "at risk of extinction" by the Ministerio de Agricultura, Alimentación y Medio Ambiente, the Spanish ministry of agriculture, on 7 November 1997. A breeders' association, the Associació de Ramaders de Bestiar Boví de Raça de Menorca, was formed in 1998, and the Menorquina breed received official recognition on 31 March 2000. At the end of 2014 the total population was recorded as 1536, of which 1196 were female and 340 male; in 2024 it was 2205, including 1324 breeding cows and 127 active bulls.

== Use and management ==
The Menorquina was formerly a triple-purpose breed, used as a draught animal and for milk and meat production. It is now raised mainly for dairy use, and is one of only two autochthonous breeds of dairy cattle of Spain, the other being the Pasiega of Cantabria. Milk yield may exceed 4000 litres per lactation. The milk is not usually sold, but is used to make Formatge de Maó, a traditional local cheese which has European Union DOP status.

The Menorquina is well adapted to the Mediterranean climate and landscape, and is used in vegetation management. It has a high level of resistance to piroplasmosis, which is endemic to Menorca.
