= Victoria Civera =

Spanish painter

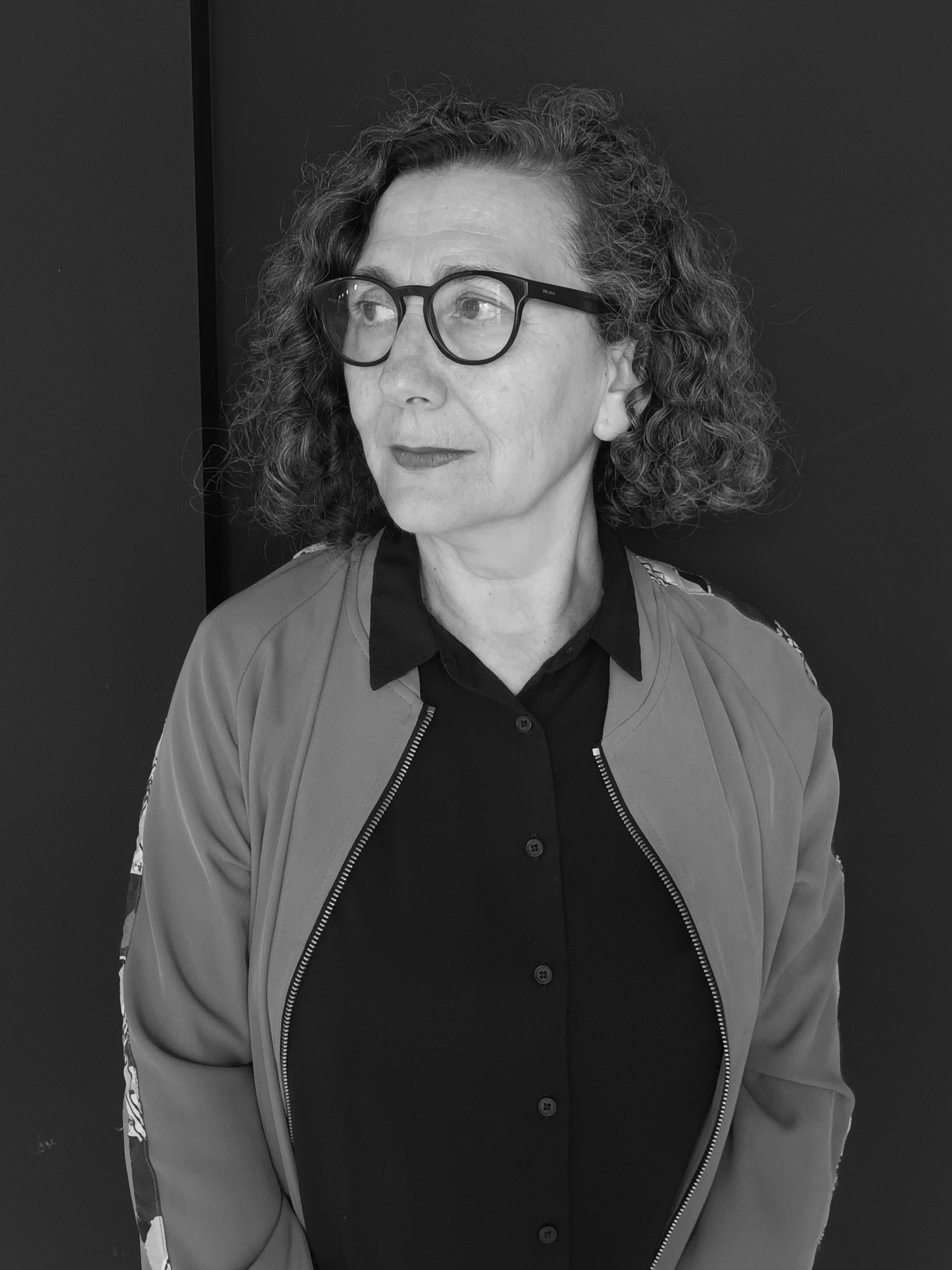
- Born: Victoria Civera Redondo; 1955 (age 69–70); Puerto de Sagunto, Valencia, Spain
- Other names: Vicky Civera, Victoria Uslé-Civera
- Education: Real Academia de Bellas Artes de San Carlos de Valencia
- Spouse: Juan Uslé

Victoria Civera Redondo (born 1955) is a Spanish artist. She combines photography, painting, installation and sculpture in her contemporary works. She lives between New York City and Saro in Cantabria, Spain. Her work has been shown internationally, including in the United States, Belgium, France and Brazil.

== Biography ==
Victoria Civera Redondo was born in 1955 in Puerto de Sagunto in Valencia, Spain. Civera studied at the Real Academia de Bellas Artes de San Carlos de Valencia, between 1973 and 1977. She is married to artist Juan Uslé, whom she has occasionally worked together with. Together they have a daughter, Vicky Uslé (born 1981) who is also a painter.

Civera's first solo exhibition was held at the Museo de Bellas Artes de Santander (now Museo de Arte Moderno y Contemporáneo de Santander y Cantabria) in 1980. Since 1987, she lives with her family between New York City and Saro, Cantabria.

Her artwork find personal meaning in the use and imagery of inanimate objects and repeating shapes. Some of her work explores space and volume; and will experiment with form both on and off canvas. In 2017, Civera was awarded the Tomás Francisco Prieto Prize.
