= Santiurde de Toranzo =

- Municipality
- Flag Coat of arms

- Location of the Municipality of Santiurde de Toranzo

- Location in Spain
- Coordinates: 43°14′23″N 3°56′16″W
- Country: Spain
- Autonomous community: Cantabria
- Province: Cantabria
- Comarca: Valles Pasiegos
- Judicial district: Medio Cudeyo
- Capital: Santiurde de Toranzo

Government
  - Alcalde: Aniceto Pellón Rodríguez (2007) (PP)

Area
  - Total: 36.82 km^{2} (14.22 sq mi)
- Elevation: 120 m (390 ft)
- Highest elevation: 876 m (2,874 ft)
- Lowest elevation: 73 m (240 ft)

Population (2025-01-01)
  - Total: 1,726
  - Density: 46.88/km^{2} (121.4/sq mi)
- Time zone: UTC+1 (CET)
  - Summer (DST): UTC+2 (CEST)
- Official language(s): Spanish
- Website: Official website

Santiurde de Toranzo is a municipality of Cantabria. The Pas River runs through it.

== Towns within the municipality ==
- Acereda
- Bárcena
- Iruz
- Pando
- Penilla
- San Martín
- Santiurde de Toranzo (Capital)
- Vejorís
- Villasevil
