= Pisueña (river) =

River in Spain

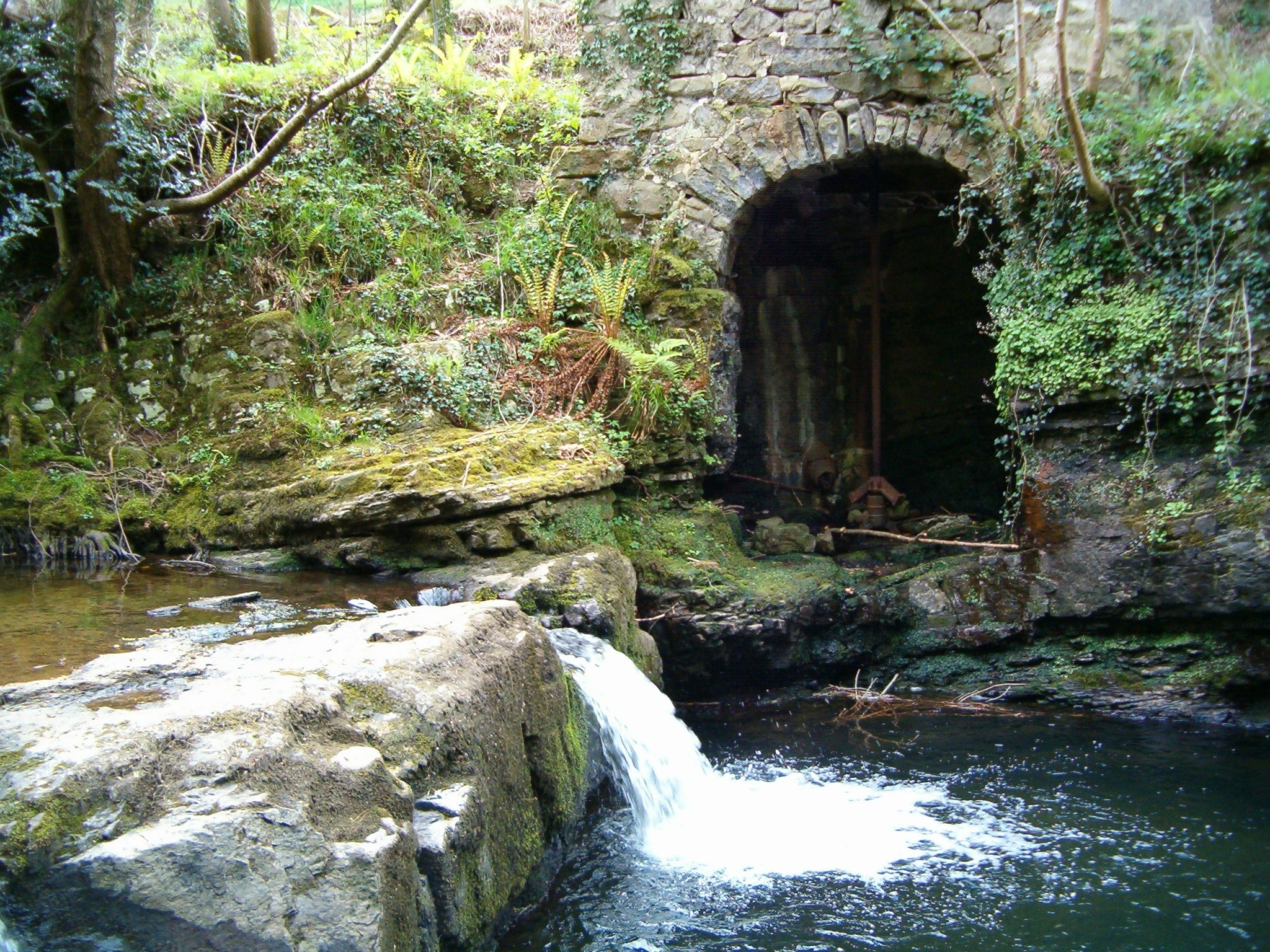
- The Pisueña in its high course

Location
- Country: Spain
- State: Cantabria
- Region: Pas-Miera

Physical characteristics
- Source
  - location: La Garma, Pisueña
- Mouth
  - location: Vargas
- Length: 36.2 km (22.5 mi)
- Basin size: 201 km^{2} (78 sq mi)
- Discharge
  - location: Pas River

Basin features
- Tributaries
  - right: Campillo (river), Suscuaja

The Pisueña River is located at northern Spain, in the area known as Green Spain. It flows through the autonomous community of Cantabria, and it is a tributary to the Pas.

== See also ==
- List of rivers of Spain
