= Idi probak =

Basque sport involving oxen dragging big rocks

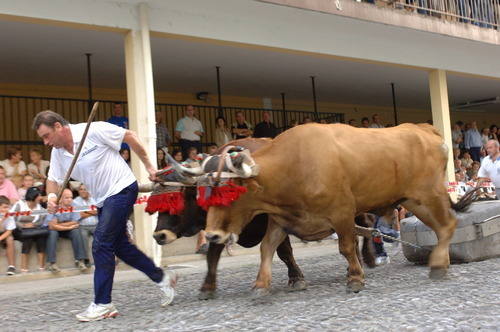
Idi probak in Urnieta, 2008

The idi probak or idi demak (Basque for "oxen trials") are the most popular form of Basque dragging games. It involves oxen, usually a pair, dragging a rock (probarria, lit. "the trial stone"), typically weighing between 1,500 and 4,500kg, from one side of a square to another. They are considered part of traditional Basque rural sports, widely practiced throughout the Basque Country.

In Spanish this sport is called arrastre de piedra (stone dragging), and concours de bœufs (oxen competition) in French.

== Location ==
Although idi probak can in theory be carried out on any reasonably flat surface, the preference is to conduct them on specially constructed proba tokiak (test places). They are ideally:

- 22.3m wide, with 8 lanes of 2.79m
- cobbled to reduce friction
- on totally flat ground
- between 22-28m long although this may vary depending on the space available

Some have a paved surface but these are unpopular because the oxen find it more difficult to get a good grip on a smooth surface.

== Rules ==
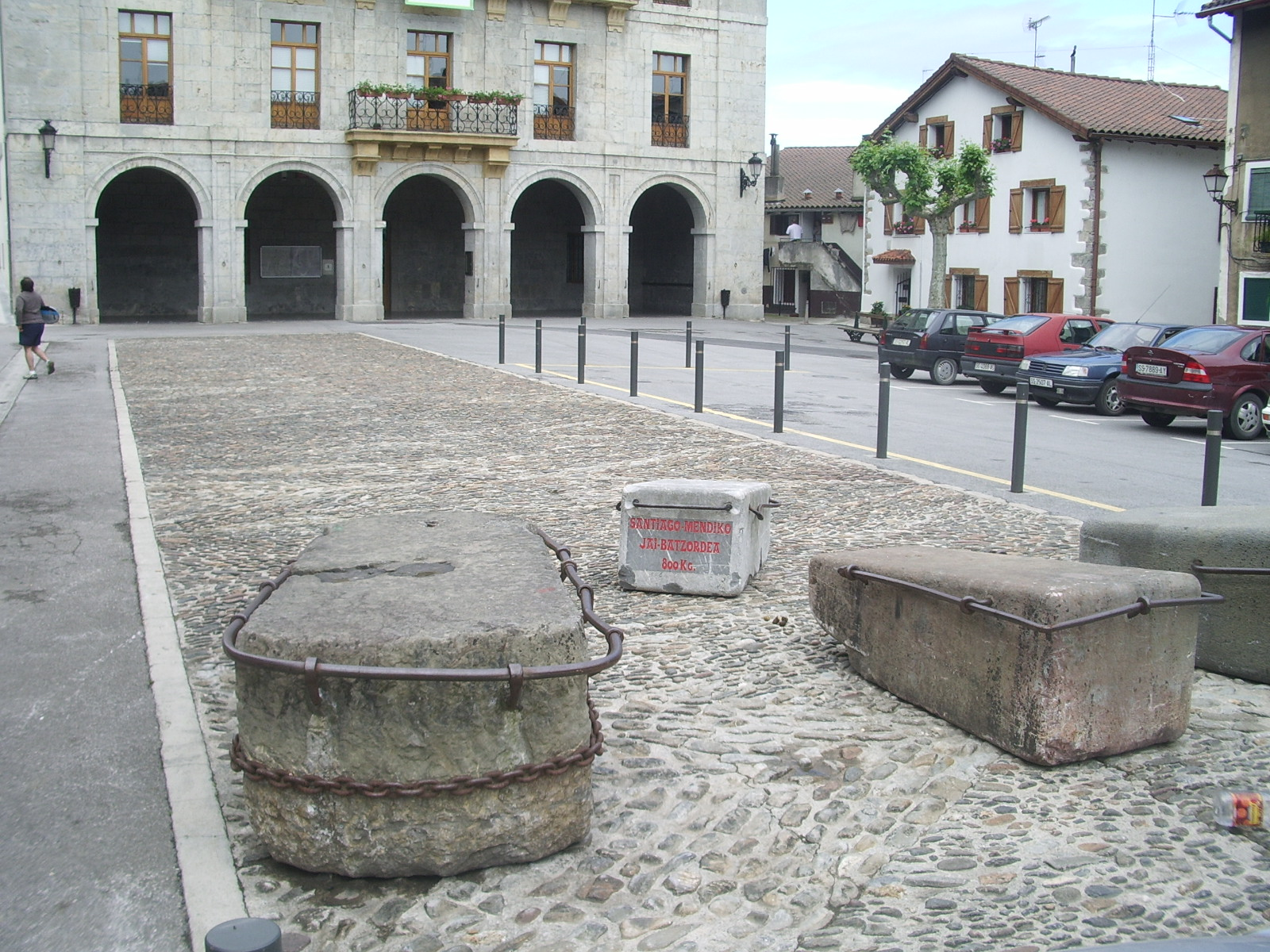
A proba toki and probarriak in Astigarraga

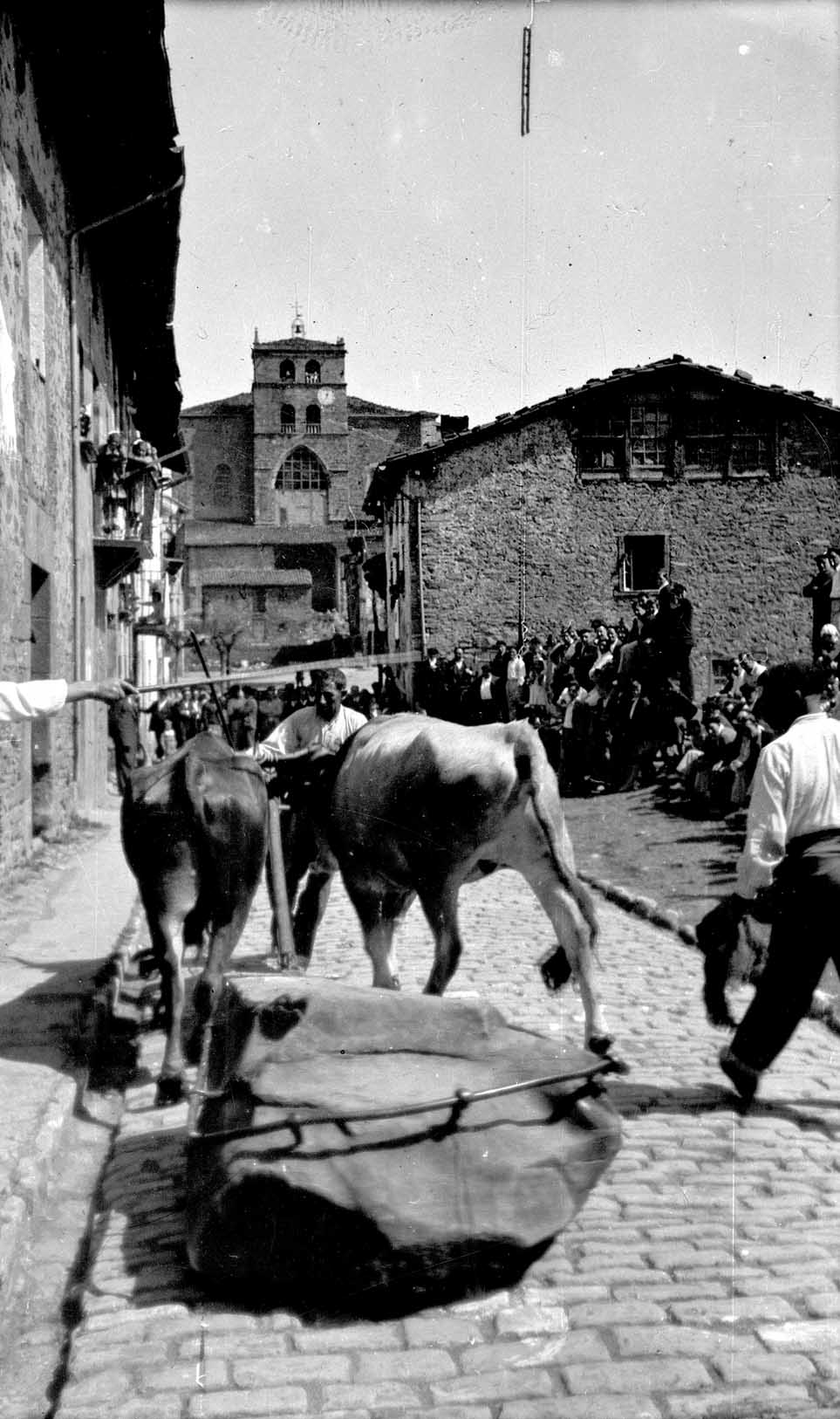
Oxen pulling an irregular stone in Elgeta in 1944

The oxen used in idi probak usually weigh between 500-650 kg although oxen weighing more than 1400 kg have also been used in competitions. During the year, they are taken for walks of around 5 km in the hills and mountains daily to maintain their strength. They are also trained in dragging rocks and working in teams during the year and many baserris (Basque farmhouses) still have their own rocks for dragging.

As all oxen in the Basque Country, they are yoked at the horns.

The rocks, called probarriak or "test rocks", are roughly rectangular, slightly narrower at the front end with a hole for attaching the chain. The weight varies from town to town and may be between 1500-4000 kg or higher. For example, in Tolosa the stones weight 4000 kg, in Gernika 4500 kg. The town of Berriatua has a rock in the proba toki weighing 5250 kg but hasn't been used since 1950 mainly because today the preference is to see the teams complete more circuits rather than drag larger rocks. If an oxen is over the weight limit (usually around 1100 kg), extra weights are put on the probarriak. For every kilo the ox is over, 1.5 kg are added to the rock.

The goal of the competition is to complete as many plaza (the distance between the two ends of the proba toki) as possible within a given period of time. Today this is normally half an hour but has been known to last up to two hours.

Straws are drawn to decide the order in which the teams compete. To go first is not considered fortunate as there will be no reference as to the performance of the other teams yet.

The start is announced with a whistle. The itzaina (ox-herder) and the akuilutzaileak (goaders) now have to steer the oxen along the track. The itzaina leads the team from the front, the akuilutzaile tries to steer both the oxen and the rock from the back. Ideally a team completes a full plaza without stopping as it costs a lot of energy to get the rock moving. They also try to keep to the middle of the track because if a rock touches or goes over the side demarcation this is seen as a foul and the team has to restart from the place the rock went over the line. Once the other side is reached, the team has to turn around and return to the start line.

At the end of the competition, the referees announce the results both in plazak and meters raced.

The number of prodders can vary depending on the bets or the rules for the event. Usually a team of two is used but there are also events where only one ox is used, which is called uztarri bakarrean or "single yoke".

== History ==
As so many Basque sports, the idi proba has its roots in the rural communities. Oxen were in widespread use due to the hilly topography of the Basque Country to which oxen are better suited than horses or mules.

Traditionally the oxen were used as working oxen during the year and put onto light duty and receiving a special diet only in the run-up to the probak. Today few people keep working oxen and most are kept and trained solely for the probak.

== Doping and animal welfare ==
The popularity of the sport and the associated heavy betting has not left the sport unscathed. The Basque oral tradition records cases of animal maltreatment with trainers spurning on their teams too harshly and such cases also occur today.

There has also been a number of cases of doping. Although the number of cases is low, the Basque regional governments started introducing anti-doping measures in 1997 and created the office of Official Veterinarian in 2005 to help ensure good practice.

== See also ==
- Basque rural sports
- Bovine sports
