= Puente Viesgo =

- Municipality
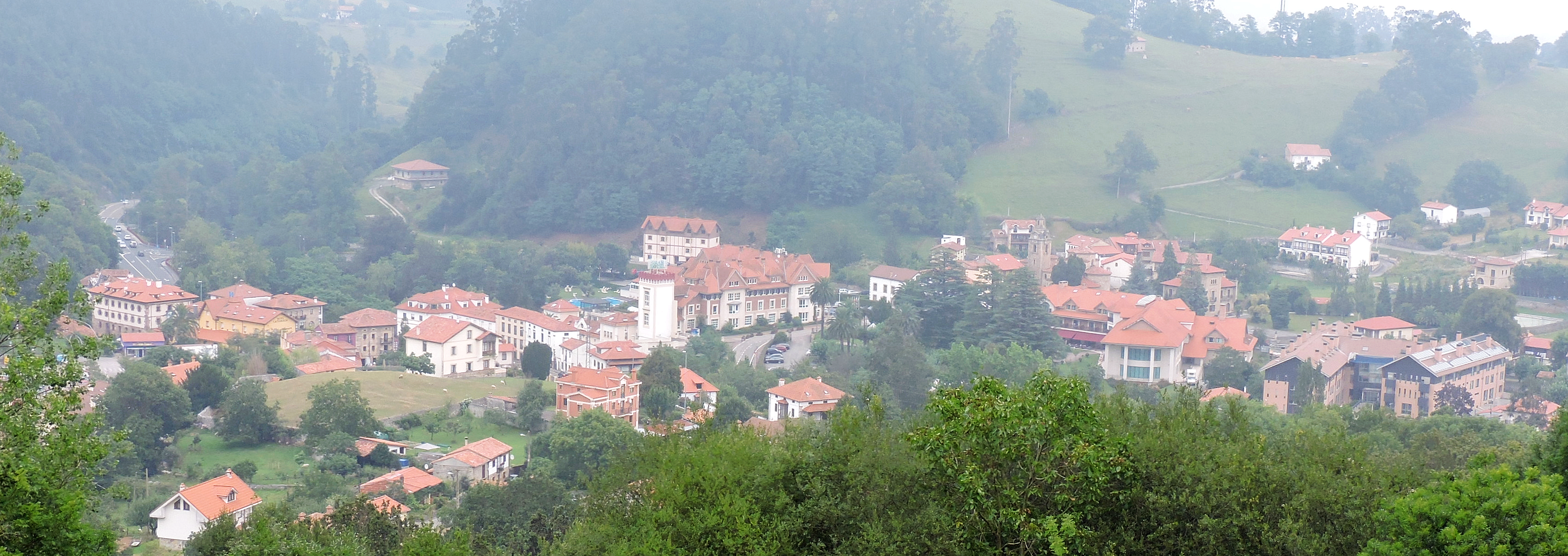

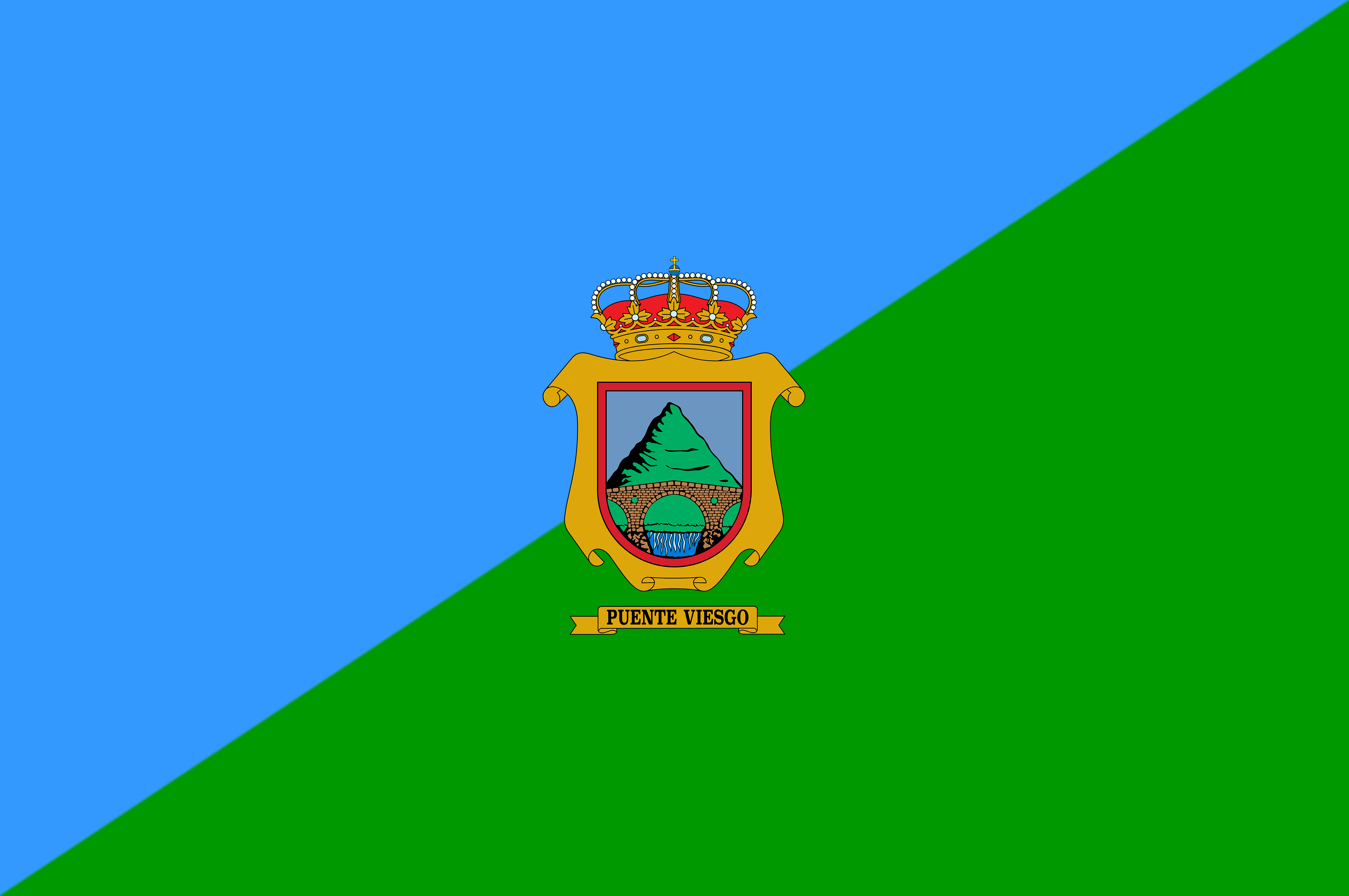
- Flag Coat of arms

- Location of Puente Viesgo within Cantabria Location of Puente Viesgo within Spain
- Coordinates: 43°18′2″N 3°57′47″W
- Country: Spain
- Autonomous community: Cantabria
- Province: Cantabria
- Comarca: Valles Pasiegos

Government
  - Mayor: Alejandro Sáez García (2010) (PRC)

Area
  - Total: 36.14 km^{2} (13.95 sq mi)
- Elevation: 71 m (233 ft)
- Highest elevation: 730 m (2,400 ft)
- Lowest elevation: 70 m (230 ft)

Population (2025-01-01)
  - Total: 2,893
  - Density: 80.05/km^{2} (207.3/sq mi)
- Demonym(s): Spanish: torancés (m.), torancesa (f.)
- Time zone: UTC+1 (CET)
  - Summer (DST): UTC+2 (CEST)
- Official language(s): Spanish
- Website: Official website

Puente Viesgo is a municipality in Cantabria, Spain. Caves have been discovered near Puente Viesgo that contain rock art and artefacts dating back to the Middle and Upper Paleolithic.

== History ==
The various populations of Puente Viesgo (Viesgo Bridge) are documented since the year 1000 by the abbey of Santillana del Mar. These documents describe a bridge over the river Pas, from which comes the name of the municipality.

== Caves of Monte Castillo ==
The Cave of El Castillo was discovered in 1903 by the Spanish archaeologist Hermilio Alcalde del Río and was first explored and excavated by the German prehistorian Hugo Obermaier, with further excavation taking place in 1980. There are paintings of bison and horses, and large numbers of handprints, made by blowing mineral particles onto a hand pressed against the cave wall. These are believed to be the oldest examples of rock art in the region. They could not be dated by radiocarbon techniques because the pigments contained no organic matter, but were dated by assessing the age of the calcium carbonate deposit that had formed over the surface. One red disc was found to be 40,800 years old.

Another cave nearby is the Cueva de las Monedas. The paintings here are black, being made with coal, and depict horses, goats, bears, bison and reindeer. The pictures of reindeer are believed to date back to the last ice age, about 13,000 years ago.

Also in the municipality is the Cueva de La Pasiega, part of the World Heritage Site that includes the "Cave of Altamira and palaeolithic cave art of Northern Spain".

== Geography ==
Puente Viesgo is in the valley of the River Pas and is located in the central part of Cantabria, about 30 kilometres (19 mi) west of the regional capital, Santander. It is surrounded by the verdant countryside of the coastal strip and lies between the Bay of Biscay to the north and the Cantabrian Mountains to the south. The economy has traditionally been based on agriculture but now many people are employed in the tourist industry. The municipality consists of the villages, Aés, Hijas, Las Presillas, Puente Viesgo and Vargas. The population at the last census was 2,800, giving a density of 78 inhabitants per square kilometre.

== Gallery ==
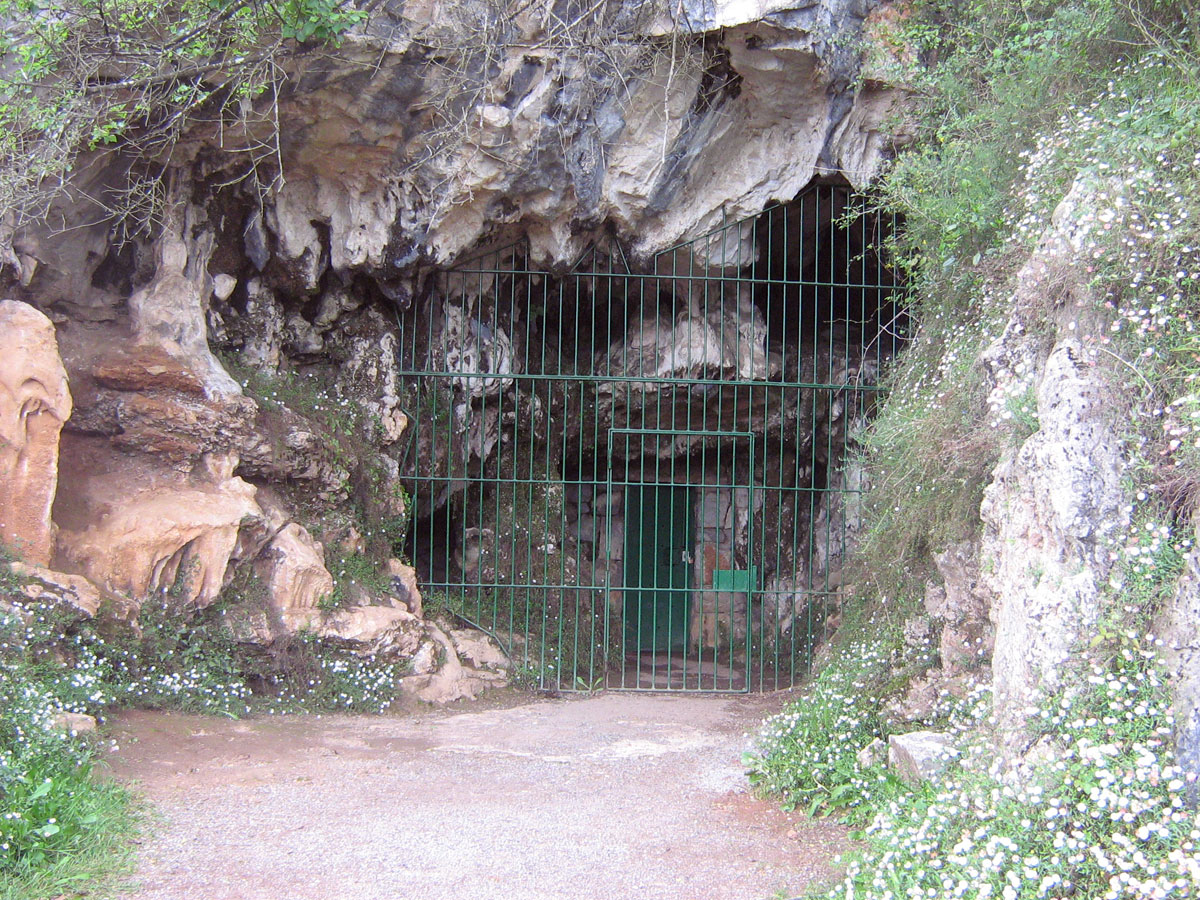
Cave of Las Monedas

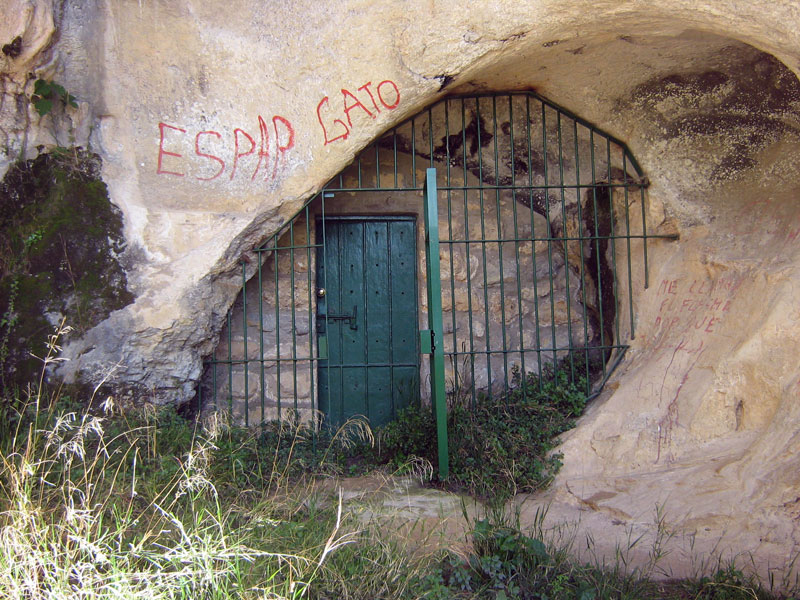
Cave of El Haza

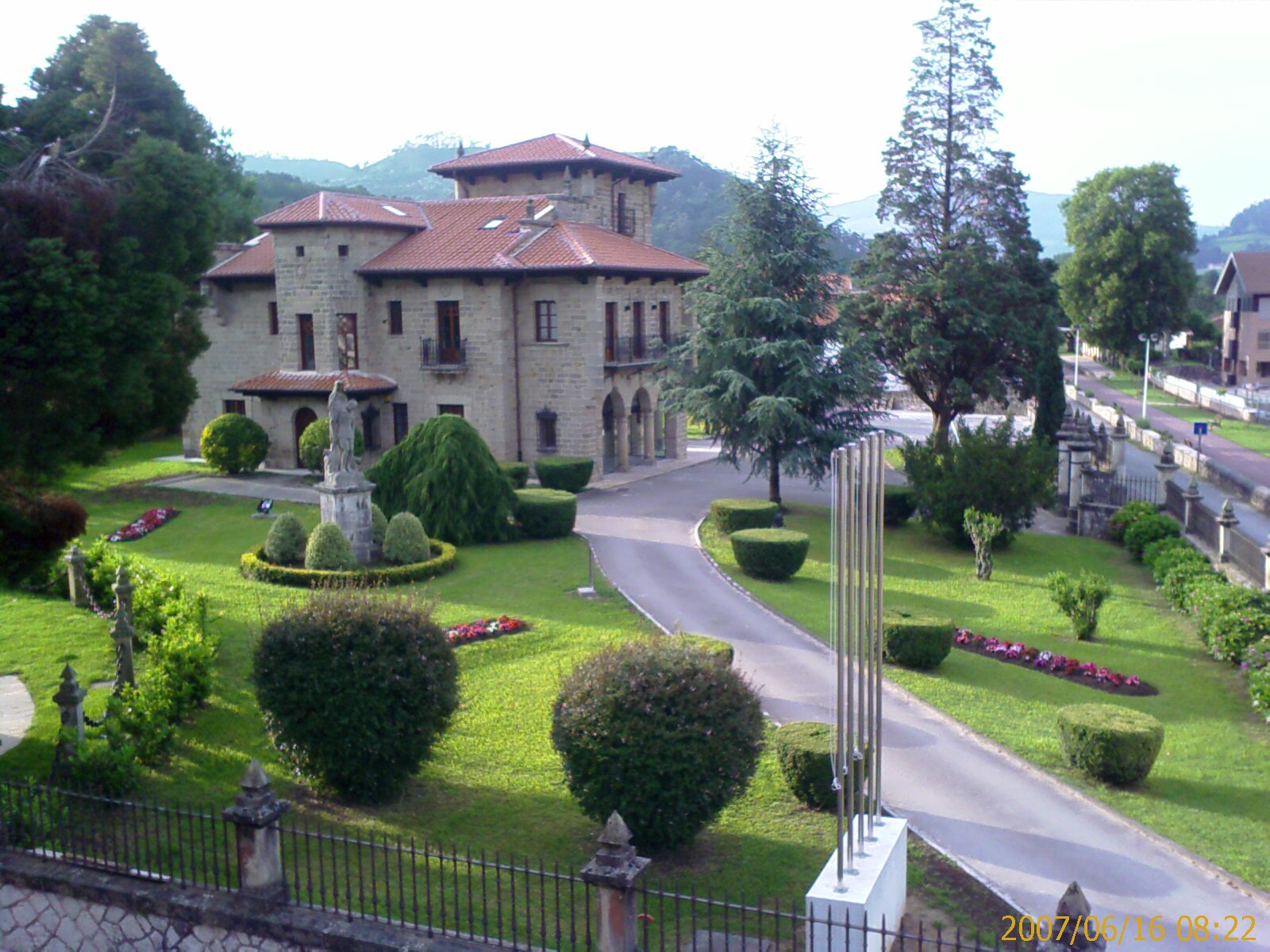
Old houses in Puente Viesgo

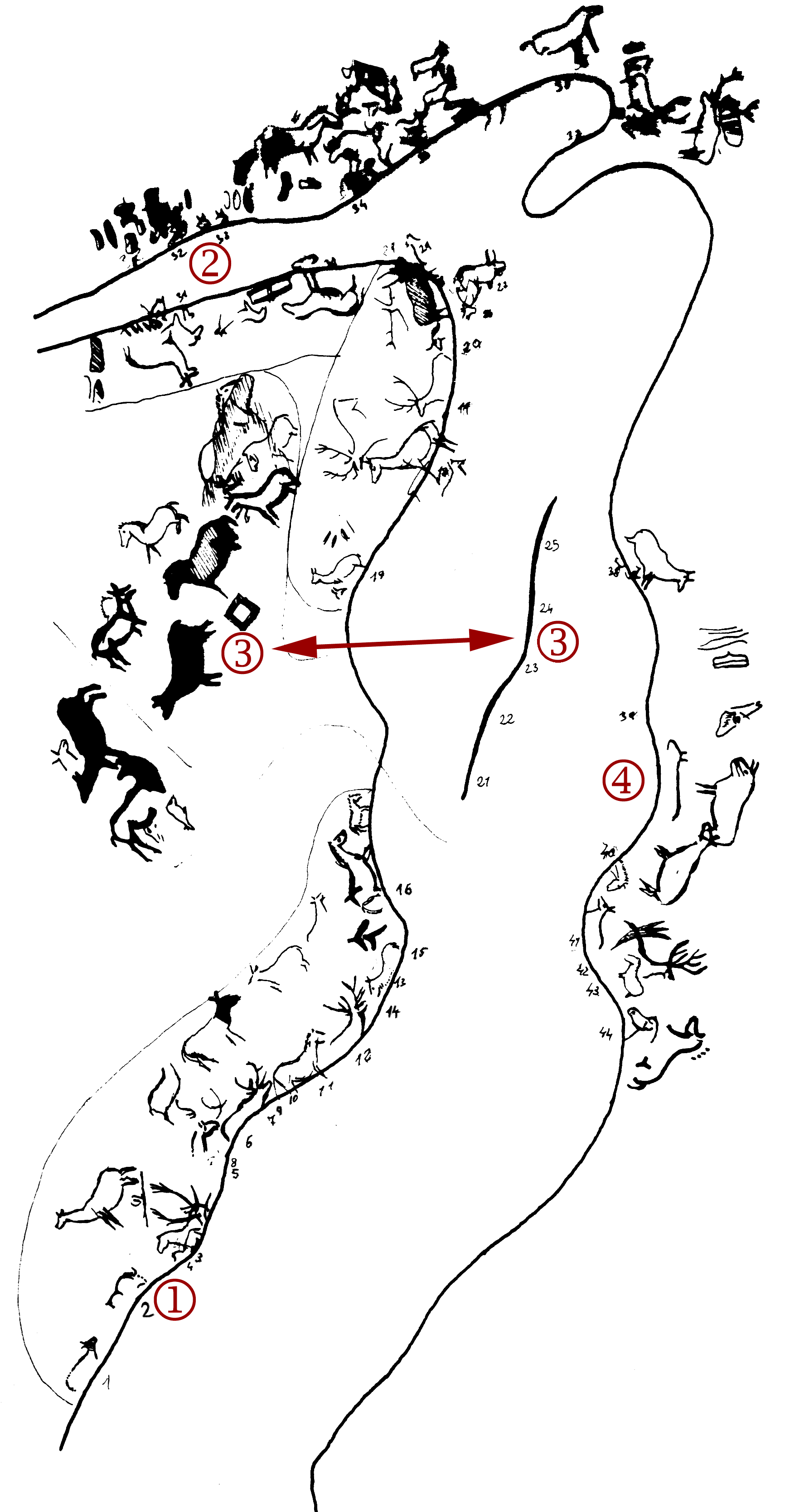
Cave of La Pasiega
