= Vega de Pas =

- Municipality
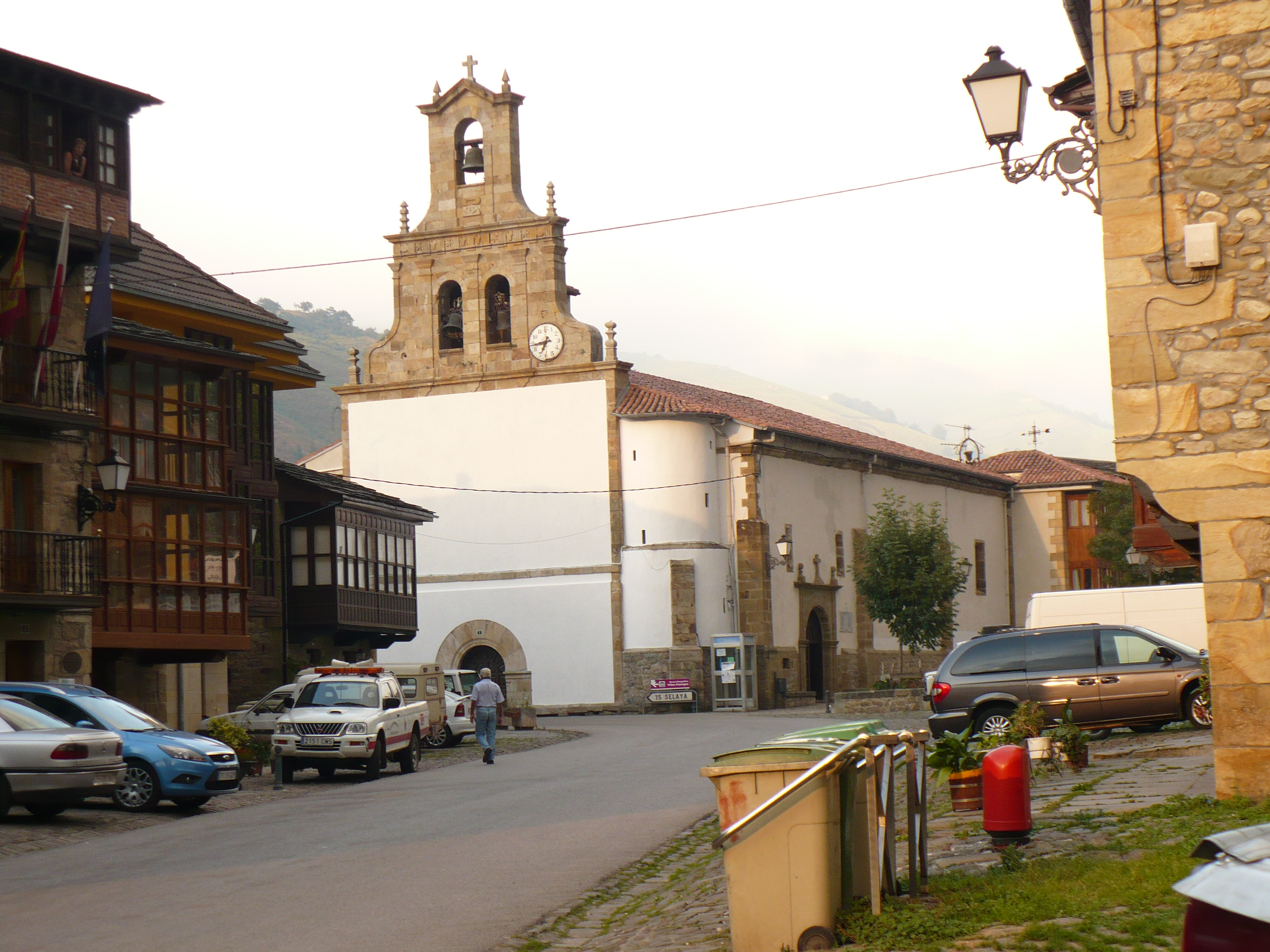

- Coat of arms

- Location in Spain
- Coordinates: 43°9′34″N 3°46′52″W
- Country: Spain
- Autonomous community: Cantabria
- Province: Cantabria
- Comarca: Valles Pasiegos

Government
  - Mayor: Víctor Manuel Gómez Arroyo

Area
  - Total: 87.53 km^{2} (33.80 sq mi)
- Elevation: 358 m (1,175 ft)

Population (2025-01-01)
  - Total: 776
  - Density: 8.87/km^{2} (23.0/sq mi)
- Demonym: Pasiegos
- Time zone: UTC+1 (CET)
  - Summer (DST): UTC+2 (CEST)
- Website: Official website

Vega de Pas is a municipality located in the autonomous community of Cantabria, Spain.
