= Urdiales =

Urdiales is a surname. Notable people with the surname include:

- Alberto Urdiales (born 1968), Spanish handball player
- Andrew Urdiales (1964–2018), American serial killer
- José Raúl Baena Urdiales (born 1989), Spanish footballer

== See also ==
- Castro Urdiales, is a seaport of northern Spain
- Urdiales del Páramo, is a municipality located in the province of León, Spain
