= Castañeda, Spain =

Castañeda
- Municipality
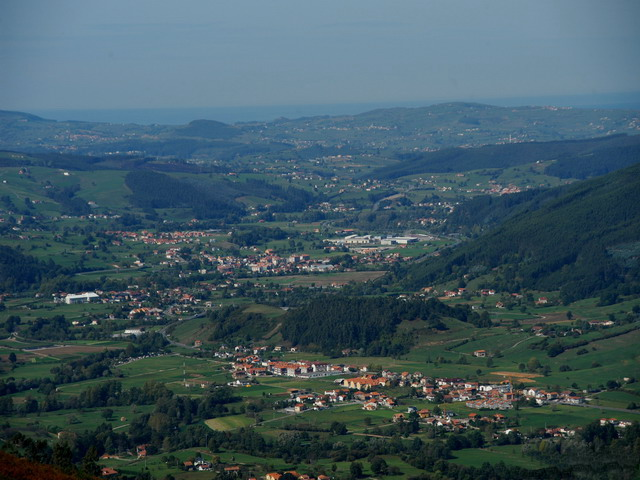
- Aerial view of Castañeda

- Flag Coat of arms

- Location of Castañeda

- Location within Cantabria Castañeda (Spain)
- Coordinates: 43°18′41″N 3°55′41″W
- Country: Spain
- Autonomous community: Cantabria
- Province: Cantabria
- Comarca: Pas and Miera valleys
- Judicial district: Medio Cudeyo
- Capital: Pomaluengo

Government
  - Alcalde: Santiago Mantecón Laso (2011)) (Partido Popular de Castañeda)

Area
  - Total: 19.19 km^{2} (7.41 sq mi)
- Elevation: 66 m (217 ft)

Population (2025-01-01)
  - Total: 3,290
  - Density: 171/km^{2} (444/sq mi)
- Time zone: UTC+1 (CET)
  - Summer (DST): UTC+2 (CEST)
- Website: Official website

Castañeda is a municipality located in the autonomous community of Cantabria, Spain. According to the 2007 census, the city has a population of 1,621 inhabitants. Its capital is Pomaluengo.
