= San Roque de Riomiera =

- Municipality
- Location of San Roque de Riomiera

- Location in Spain
- Coordinates: 43°14′9″N 3°42′1″W
- Country: Spain
- Autonomous community: Cantabria
- Province: Cantabria
- Comarca: Valles Pasiegos
- Judicial district: Medio Cudeyo
- Capital: La Pedrosa

Government
  - Alcalde: Juan Antonio Fernández Abascal

Area
  - Total: 35.7 km^{2} (13.8 sq mi)
- Elevation: 426 m (1,398 ft)

Population (2025-01-01)
  - Total: 333
  - Density: 9.33/km^{2} (24.2/sq mi)
- Time zone: UTC+1 (CET)
  - Summer (DST): UTC+2 (CEST)

San Roque de Riomiera is a municipality located in the autonomous community of Cantabria, Spain.

== Localities ==
- La Concha.
- Merilla.
- La Pedrosa (Capital).
