= Villafufre =

Municipality in Spain

- Municipality
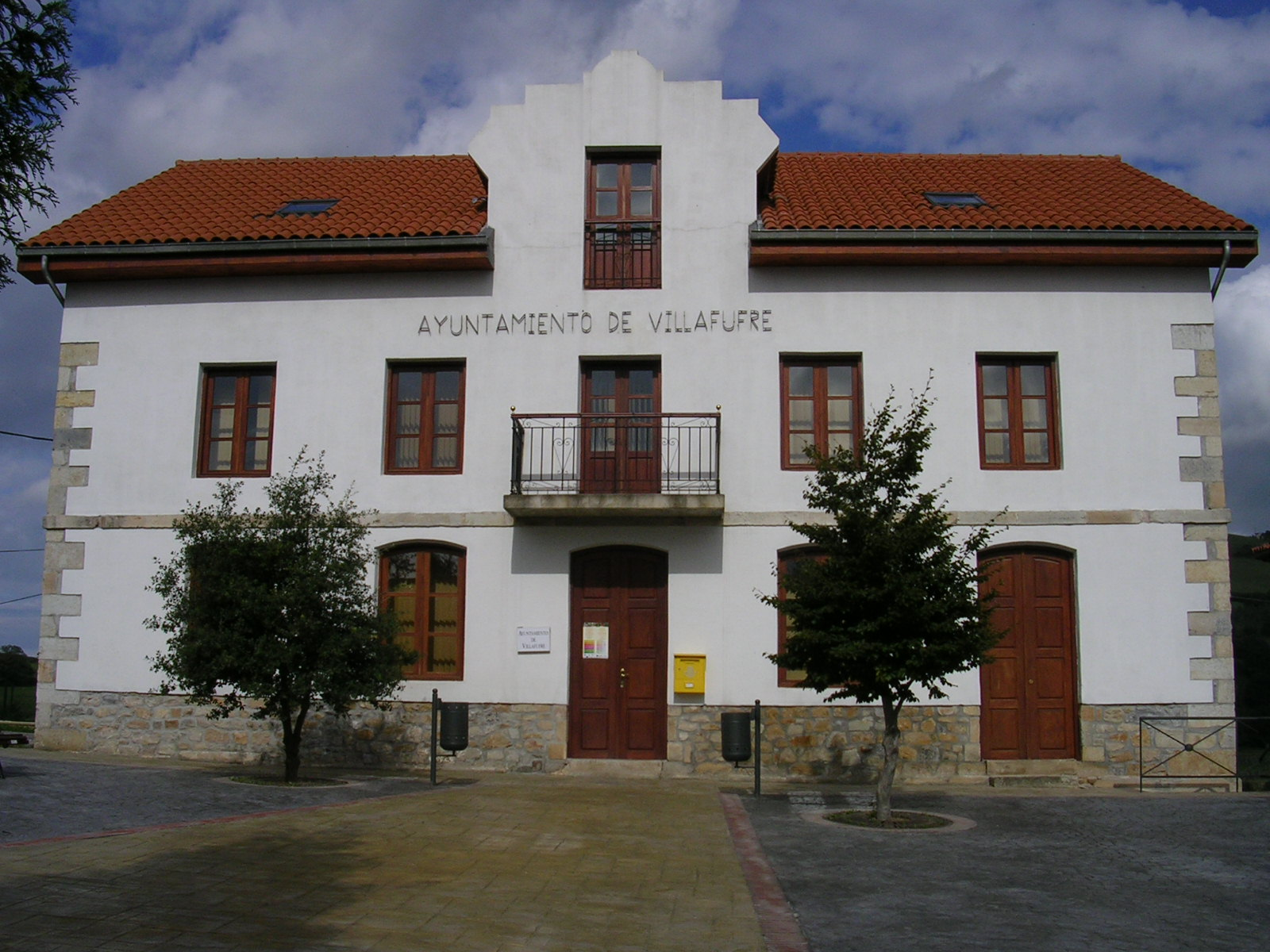
- Town hall

- Flag Coat of arms

- Location in Spain.
- Coordinates: 43°16′02″N 3°53′31″W
- Country: Spain
- Autonomous community: Cantabria

Area
  - Total: 30.1 km^{2} (11.6 sq mi)
- Elevation: 750 m (2,460 ft)

Population (2025-01-01)
  - Total: 1,022
  - Density: 34.0/km^{2} (87.9/sq mi)
- Time zone: UTC+1 (CET)
  - Summer (DST): UTC+2 (CEST)
- Website: villafufre.com

Villafufre is a municipality in Cantabria, Spain.
