= Villacarriedo =

- Municipality
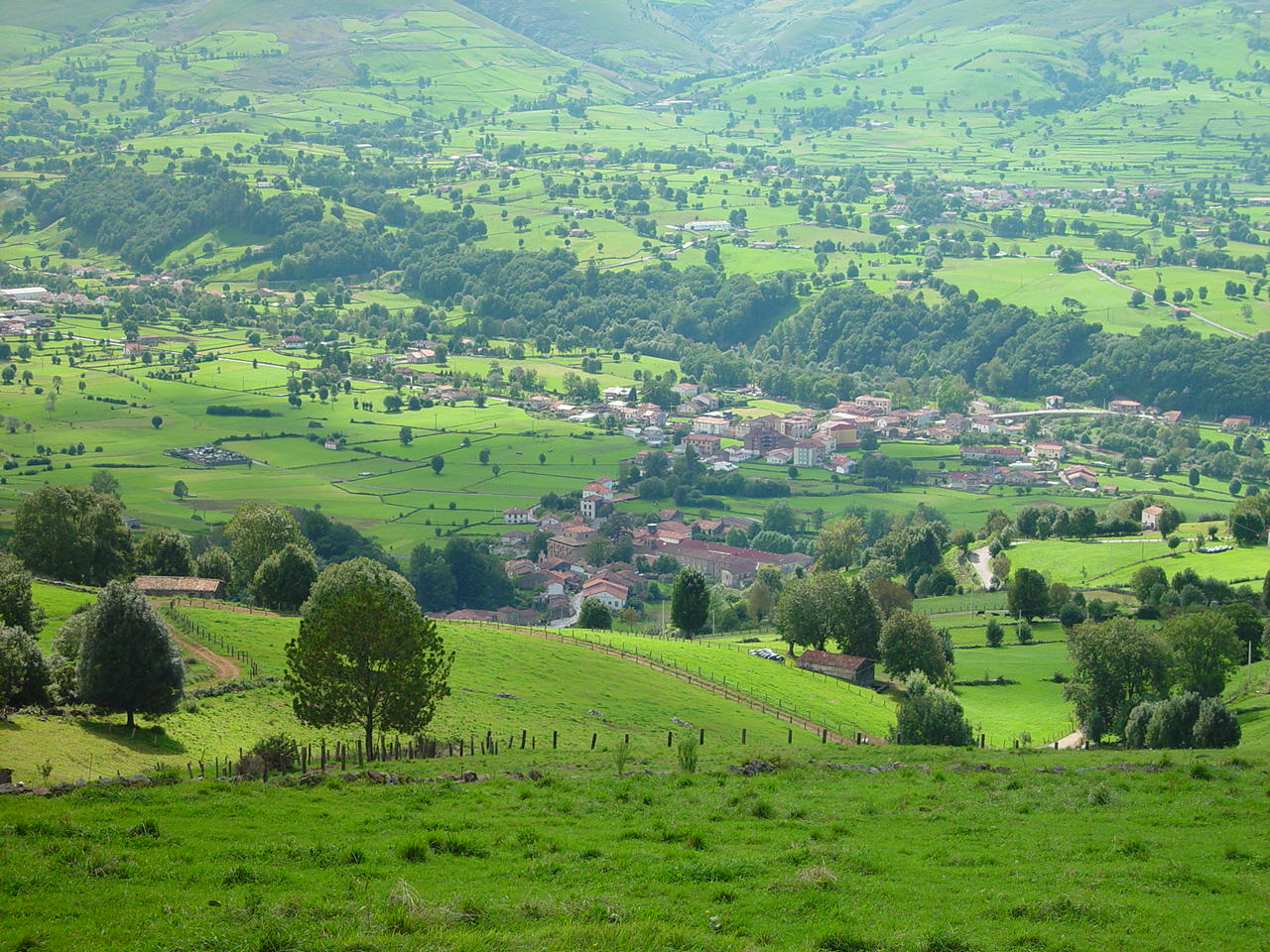

- Coat of arms

- Location in Spain Villacarriedo (Spain)
- Coordinates: 43°13′46″N 3°48′33″W
- Country: Spain
- Autonomous community: Cantabria
- Province: Cantabria
- Seat: Villacarriedo

Government
  - Alcalde: Ángel Sainz Ruiz (PRC)

Area
  - Total: 50.74 km^{2} (19.59 sq mi)
- Elevation: 211 m (692 ft)

Population (2025-01-01)
  - Total: 1,670
  - Density: 32.9/km^{2} (85.2/sq mi)
- Time zone: UTC+1 (CET)
  - Summer (DST): UTC+2 (CEST)
- Postal code: 39640
- Website: Ayunt. de Villacarriedo

Villacarriedo is a municipality in the Spanish "comunidad autónoma" of Cantabria.

== Sub-districts and demography ==
In 2009 the municipality contained 1,765 registered inhabitants divided between the various villages and hamlets as follows:

- Abionzo (174 people)
- Aloños (159 people)
- Bárcena de Carriedo (185 people)
- Pedroso (71 people)
- Santibáñez (254 people)
- Soto (29 people)
- Tezanos (385 people)
- Villacarriedo (capital) (508 people)

== Location ==
Villacarriedo, the administrative centre and the most populous village in the municipality, is positioned 211 meters above sea level and 36 km (22 miles) to the south of Santander, the Cantabrian capital.

== Economy ==
36.9% of the working population are recorded as working in the primary (agricultural) sector. 15.1% work in construction and 10.8% in industry while a further 37.2% work in the tertiary (service) sector.
