= Selaya =

Coordinates: 43°13′N 3°48′W

- Coat of arms

- Location in Spain.
- Country: Spain
- Autonomous community: Cantabria

Area
  - Total: 39.29 km^{2} (15.17 sq mi)
- Elevation: 228 m (748 ft)

Population (2025-01-01)
  - Total: 1,868
  - Density: 47.54/km^{2} (123.1/sq mi)
- Time zone: UTC+1 (CET)
  - Summer (DST): UTC+2 (CEST)
- Website: www.ayto-selaya.com

Selaya is a municipality located in the autonomous community of Cantabria, Spain.
