= Saro, Spain =

Saro
- Municipality
- Coat of arms

- Location of Saro

- Location in Spain
- Coordinates: 43°15′45″N 3°49′42″W
- Country: Spain
- Autonomous community: Cantabria
- Province: Cantabria
- Comarca: Valles Pasiegos
- Judicial district: Medio Cudeyo
- Capital: Saro

Government
  - Alcalde: Miguel Ángel Prieto Fernández

Area
  - Total: 17.82 km^{2} (6.88 sq mi)
- Elevation: 165 m (541 ft)

Population (2025-01-01)
  - Total: 480
  - Density: 27/km^{2} (70/sq mi)
- Time zone: UTC+1 (CET)
  - Summer (DST): UTC+2 (CEST)

Saro is a municipality located in the autonomous community of Cantabria, Spain.

== Localities ==
- Llerana.
- Saro (Capital).
