= San Pedro del Romeral =

Coordinates: 43.1167°N 3.8172°W

- Coat of arms

- Location in Spain.
- Country: Spain
- Autonomous community: Cantabria

Area
  - Total: 57.44 km^{2} (22.18 sq mi)
- Elevation: 756 m (2,480 ft)

Population (2025-01-01)
  - Total: 432
  - Density: 7.52/km^{2} (19.5/sq mi)
- Time zone: UTC+1 (CET)
  - Summer (DST): UTC+2 (CEST)
- Website: www.sanpedrodelromeral.com

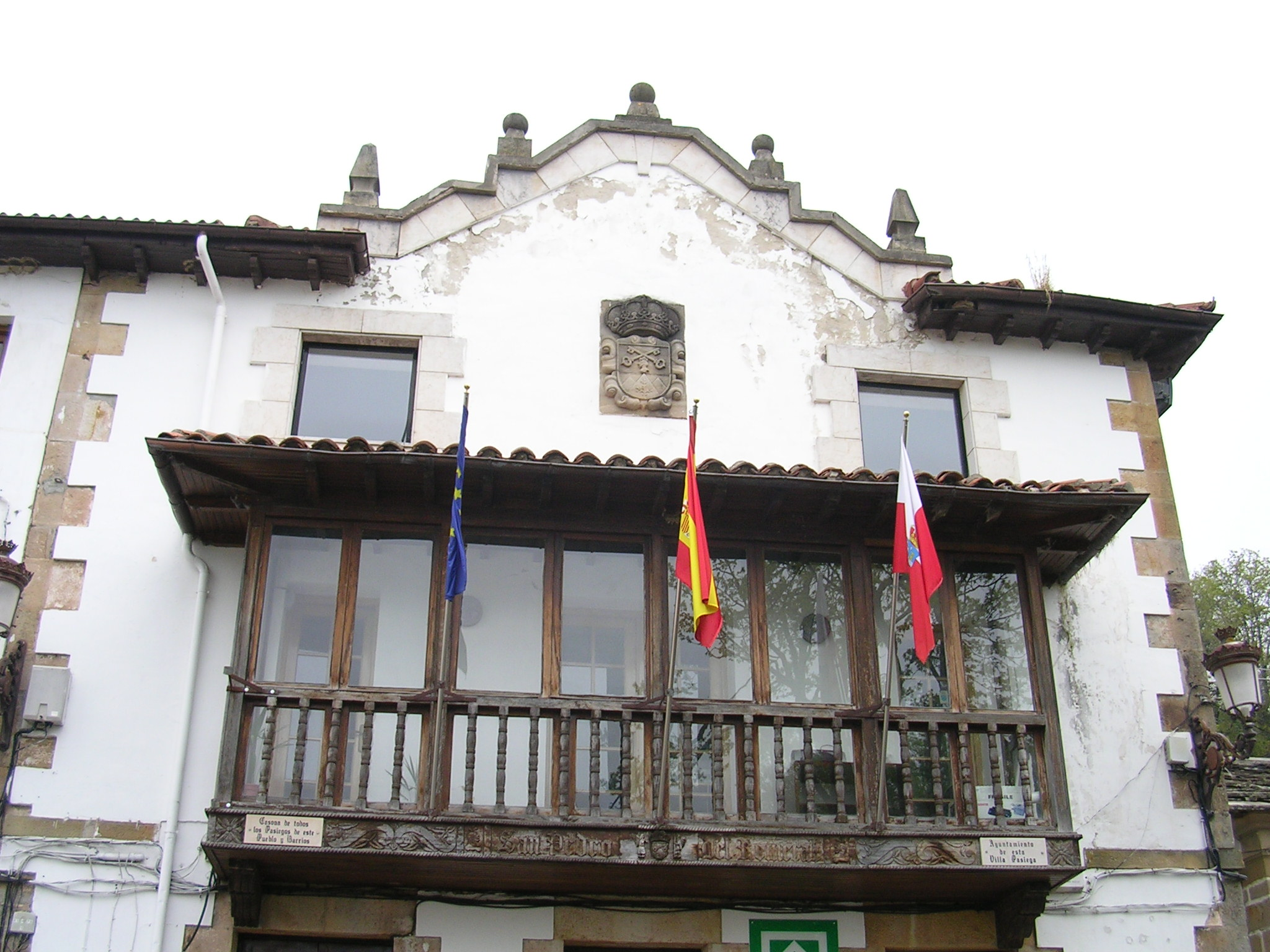

San Pedro del Romeral is a municipality in Cantabria, Spain.
