= Luena, Spain =

Luena
- Municipality
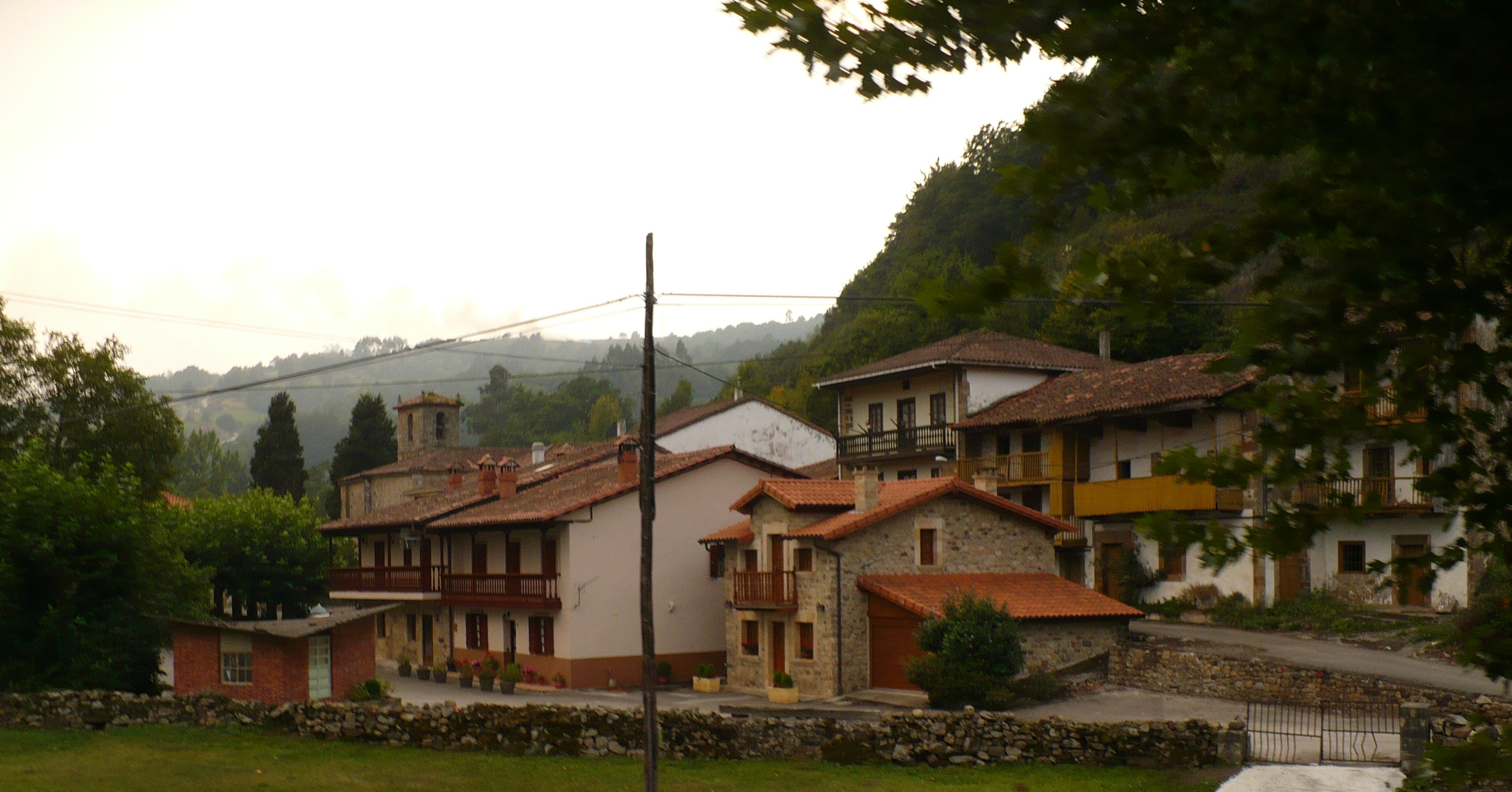
- Entrambasmestas village, Luena.

- Location of Luena

- Location in Spain
- Coordinates: 43°5′45″N 3°54′1″W
- Country: Spain
- Autonomous community: Cantabria
- Province: Cantabria
- Comarca: Pas and Miera valleys
- Judicial district: Medio Cudeyo
- Capital: San Miguel de Luena

Government
  - Alcalde: José Ángel Ruiz Gómez (2007) (PRC)

Area
  - Total: 90.54 km^{2} (34.96 sq mi)
- Elevation: 457 m (1,499 ft)

Population (2025-01-01)
  - Total: 600
  - Density: 6.6/km^{2} (17/sq mi)
- Time zone: UTC+1 (CET)
  - Summer (DST): UTC+2 (CEST)

Luena is a municipality located in the autonomous community of Cantabria, Spain. According to the 2007 census, the municipality has a population of 831 inhabitants. Its capital is San Miguel de Luena. The municipality consists of a valley which runs from the Cantabrian Mountains to the North, until it reaches the valley of the river Pas. It is a markedly rural area, where the traditional economic activity evolves around the cow.

== Towns ==
- Bollacín
- Bustasur
- Carrascal de Cocejón
- Carrascal de San Miguel
- Cazpurrión
- El Cocejón
- Entrambasmestas
- La Garma
- Llano
- Los Pandos
- Pandoto
- La Parada
- Penilla
- La Puente
- Resconorio
- Retuerta
- San Andrés de Luena
- San Miguel de Luena (capital)
- Sel de la Carrera
- Sel de la Peña
- Sel del Hoyo
- Sel del Manzano
- Selviejo
- Tablado
- Urdiales
- Vega Escobosa
- La Ventona
- Vozpornoche
