= Pas (river) =

River in Spain

Coordinates: 43°26′30″N 3°58′52″W

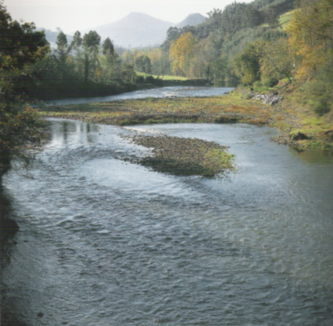

Location
- Country: Spain
- State: Cantabria
- Region: Pas valley, Santander bay

Physical characteristics
- Source
  - location: Castro Valnera
  - elevation: 1,200 m (3,900 ft)
- Mouth: Ría de Mogro
  - location: Santander bay, Bay of Biscay
  - elevation: 0 m (0 ft)
- Length: 57 km (35 mi)
- Basin size: 649 km^{2} (251 sq mi)
- Discharge
  - location: mouth
  - average: 18.1 m^{3}/s (640 cu ft/s)

Basin features
- Tributaries
  - left: Yera, Viaña, Magdalena, Jaral, Barcelada
  - right: Pandillo, Pisueña

The Pas River is located in the region of Cantabria in the northern part of Spain. The river flows through the autonomous community of Cantabria and empties into the Cantabrian Sea.

== See also ==
- List of rivers of Spain
