= Buelna (disambiguation) =

Buelna refers to:

== People ==
- Lorenzo Buelna (born 1980), former Mexican baseball player
- Rafael Buelna (1890–1924), Mexican general

== Places ==
- Buelna, a lugar in Llanes, Asturias
- Los Corrales de Buelna, a municipality in Cantabria
- San Felices de Buelna, a municipality in Cantabria

== Other uses ==
- SD Buelna, football club in Los Corrales de Buelna
- Buelna (surname)
