= Viveda =

- Locality
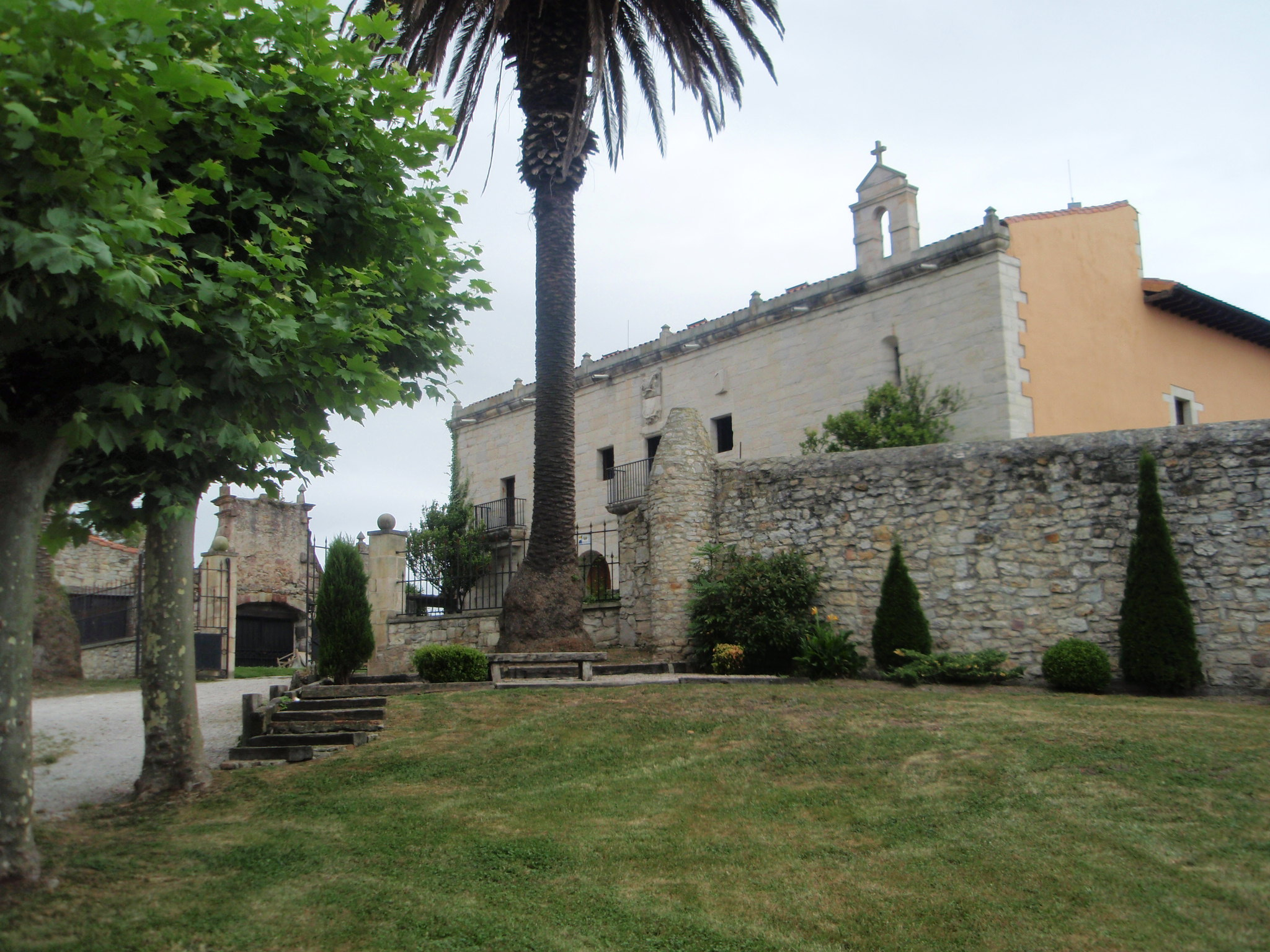

- Location within Viveda Viveda (Spain)
- Coordinates: 43°22′41″N 4°3′35″W
- Country: Spain
- Autonomous community: Cantabria
- Province: Cantabria
- Municipality: Santillana del Mar

Dimensions
  - Width: 36 km (22 mi)
- Elevation: 46 m (151 ft)

Population (2015)
  - Total: 1,176
- Demonym: vivedense
- Time zone: UTC+1 (CET)
  - Summer (DST): UTC+2 (CEST)
- Postal code: 39314

Viveda is a Lugar of the municipality of Santillana del Mar (Cantabria, Spain). It borders the towns of Barreda (municipality of Torrelavega), Queveda and Camplengo (municipality of Santillana del Mar), and Hinojedo (municipality of Suances). It is located 4 km from the municipal capital, Santillana del Mar, 3 km from the nearest city, Torrelavega, and about 22 km from Santander, Spain.

It's located 46 meters above sea level. In 2008, it had a population of 1,080 inhabitants (INE), being the most populated in the municipality. In the Middle Ages there was a monastery here, dedicated to the Divine Savior of the World, created by repopulation in the 19th century. c. 8th century or c. 9th century. The Camino de Santiago del Norte crosses the town through the neighbourhood of La Barca.

The town is easily accessible, as it is less than 3 kilometres from the junction between the Cantabrian Highway and the Plateau Highway.

Until the last years of the c. 20th century, There was a palpable tendency to group together in certain areas of the town, creating two small urban centres (in La Barca and Las Escuelas), the rest being fields for cattle and scattered houses. During the period 1998–2003 the proliferation of individual dwellings reduced this appreciation, while since 2003 the construction of numerous housing estates has usurped the town's eminently rural character, turning it into a dormitory town for the most part and linking the small groups of dwellings together.

== History ==
Although the exact origin of the village is unknown, it is known that the area was repopulated during the reign of Alfonso I of Asturias, the last Duke of Cantabria, who renounced the title. Viveda (finding the historical writings Bibeda and ViuedaGonzález) It was founded on a royal road that according to some authors was a fossil of the Roman via Agrippa, in turn part of the oldest known form of the Camino de Santiago, active since the c. 9th century. This branch was very frequented, even preferred to other northern variants. Juan Uría

The first reliable evidence of an early construction is provided by the foundation stone of the church of Viveda, later successively rebuilt, which dates its first construction in 878; that is, older than the Collegiate church and cloister of St Juliana itself, of whose existence we did not know until the year 987.

Viveda belonged to Santillana del Mar since ancient times, and the Duke of the Infantado appointed its mayor, as was also the case in other towns. It is necessary to distinguish here the lands of the Calderón de la Barca, which did not depend on the abbey. Among them was the Calderón family's own tower-house, well documented in the 1695 Calatrava file, as well as another tower from c. 17th century, now rehabilitated as an inn.

In 1787, it had 223 inhabitants. In 1840, the judicial district of Santillana was transferred to Torrelavega, the industrial centre of the region. Between the eighteenth and nineteenth centuries, in order to improve the traffic of goods, new roads were opened and Viveda remained as a crossroads between the one that linked Santander with Suances and Santillana, and all these towns with Torrelavega and Reinosa, the gateway to Castile. In 1850, Pascual Madoz says of Viveda that he has 48 houses, parish church and primary school, a figure slightly higher than the 6 plots (2 with behetry) existing in 1352, among which the houses of farmers dependent on the abbey of Santillana are not counted.

Today Viveda is a village within the Santander-Torrelavega Metropolitan Area, which is undergoing rapid construction and urbanization, putting an end to its landscape of fields at the service of livestock and small orchards.

== Monuments and places of interest ==
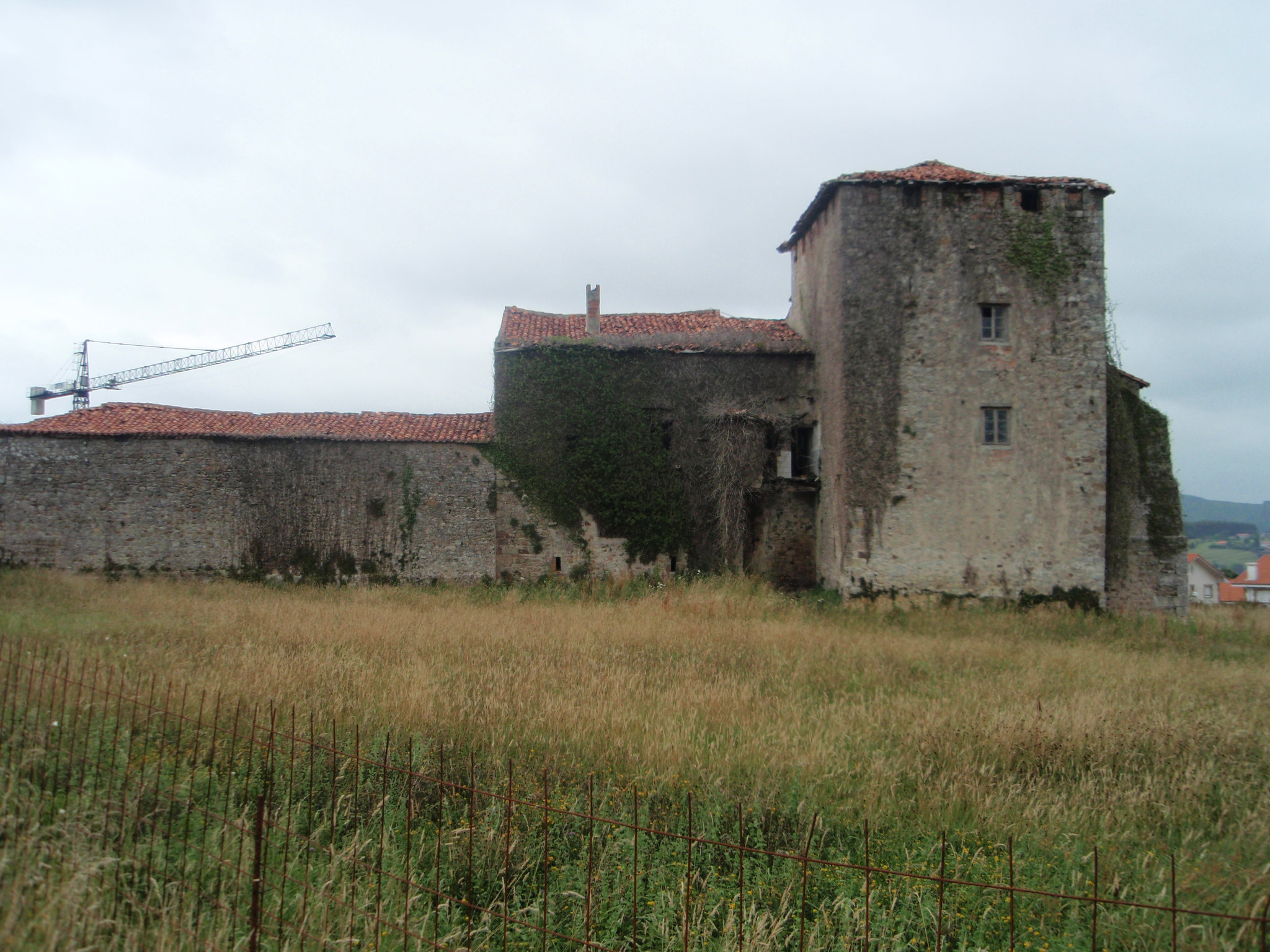
Torre de los Calderón de la Barca, the oldest civil building in Cantabria. The primitive battlements can be seen under the hipped roof of the tower.

Of the architecture of this town, the following stand out:

- Palace of Viveda (or from Peredo). Mountain house from the 17th-18th centuries, declared an Asset of Cultural Interest on February 26, 1982. It is situated on top of a hill. The south façade is Dimension stone. Inside, it has a square courtyard of two levels. On the doorway you can see the coat of arms of Peredo y Velarde. It is surrounded by a wall about 5 meters high, which houses a medieval portal with a coat of arms as well as the palace itself. Until 2004, there were a series of houses on a Gothic plot within the enclosure. It has recently been refurbished as an exhibition hall and other cultural uses, by the municipality of Santillana del Mar. It was built by Jorge de Peredo, governor of Ponferrada, and his wife María de Velarde.
  It is traditionally known as the Palace of the Golden Chin, as it is said that one of its lords owned everything that could be seen, but he was so focused on money that he did not even consider laundering.
- Medieval Tower of the Calderón de la Barca. The tower very old (it is estimated to have been built between the c. 13th century and the 15th century CE), with additions from the c. 16th century, of 1417 square meters built. It was declared a historic-artistic monument in 1982 and an Asset of Local Interest by resolution of March 30, 2002. Already mentioned in the Calatrava file (CE 1695), it is the oldest civil building in Cantabria.
  From this family descended Pedro Calderón de la Barca.
  The surname derives from the fact that they owned the boat that crossed the already united course of the rivers Saja-Besaya in Barreda (from that of Calderón, a native of the Cantabrian town of Oreña. Fray Joseph del Río says in 1661: Half a league distant from the town of Santillana, the metropolis of Asturias, in the mountains of Burgos, is the house of Calderón on the plain of showy eminence. And from the tower of Viveda: "It is bounded by the peaceful banks of the river, which there takes its name La Barca, composed of the rivers called Saja and Besaya, navigable, plentiful and very abundant in salmon.
  It is built with masonry stone and ashlar in corners and openings. It is topped by battlements and a hipped roof. It contains a chapel in a wing adjacent to the tower. Its state of conservation is deplorable.
  It has been used as early as the c. 21sr century, as a warehouse and stable, and the rooms and façades have been allowed to deteriorate. It is currently undergoing a rehabilitation project.
- Parish Church El Salvador de Viveda. There is a medieval consecration tombstone, which places the foundation of the church (later rehabilitated several times) on May 25, 878, under the direction of the Diocese of Oviedo.
  A beautiful façade Romanesque is preserved, prior to the rest of the temple, dated to the c. 16th century and largely rebuilt in 1730 after crumbling. It is located on one side of the Suances-Santillana highway.
- Chapel in the Pereo district, with a low floor and relative height.
- Chapel old, from the 15th or 16th centuries, whose whereabouts are unknown today.

=== Other equipment ===
- Parque La Alianza, developed jointly with Hinojedo. It contains barbecue facilities.
- Parque en la Pelía. It includes a traditional bowling alley and a children's play area.
- Basketball court and paddle tennis court.
- Primary school.
- Statue of Saint Francis of Assisi in the roundabout of Viveda, who according to tradition spent the night in the House-Tower of the Calderón de la Barca on his pilgrimage to Santiago de Compostela, on his way through Cantabria in 1214; this oral tradition was collected by Emilia Pardo Bazán. The statue is 2.50 meters high, made of bronze and weighs 500 kilos. It is the work of the sculptor torrelaveguense Mercedes Rodríguez Elvira.
- Aventura Viveda, organized by the Altamira Paintball.

== Demographics ==
Historical population

Year	Pop.	±%
2000	1,020	—
2001	1,007	−1.3%
2002	1,009	+0.2%
2003	1,025	+1.6%

Year	Pop.	±%
2004	1,060	+3.4%
2005	1,077	+1.6%
2006	1,069	−0.7%
2007	1,058	−1.0%

Year	Pop.	±%
2008	1,080	+2.1%
2009	1,083	+0.3%
2010	1,097	+1.3%

Source: INE "INE: Viveda". Archived from the original on 20 September 2011.

== Notable people ==
- Miguel Ángel Palacio, President of the Parliament of Cantabria in the legislatures 2003–2007 and 2007–2011.
- Family of the Pedro Calderón de la Barca, natives of Oreña, who in Viveda changed their surname from Calderón to Calderón de la Barca. From this family descends the famous Spanish playwright Pedro Calderón de la Barca.
- Iván Crespo, footballer who currently plays for Racing de Santander.
