= Saja-Besaya Natural Park =

Natural park in Cantabria, Spain

- IUCN category V (protected landscape/seascape)
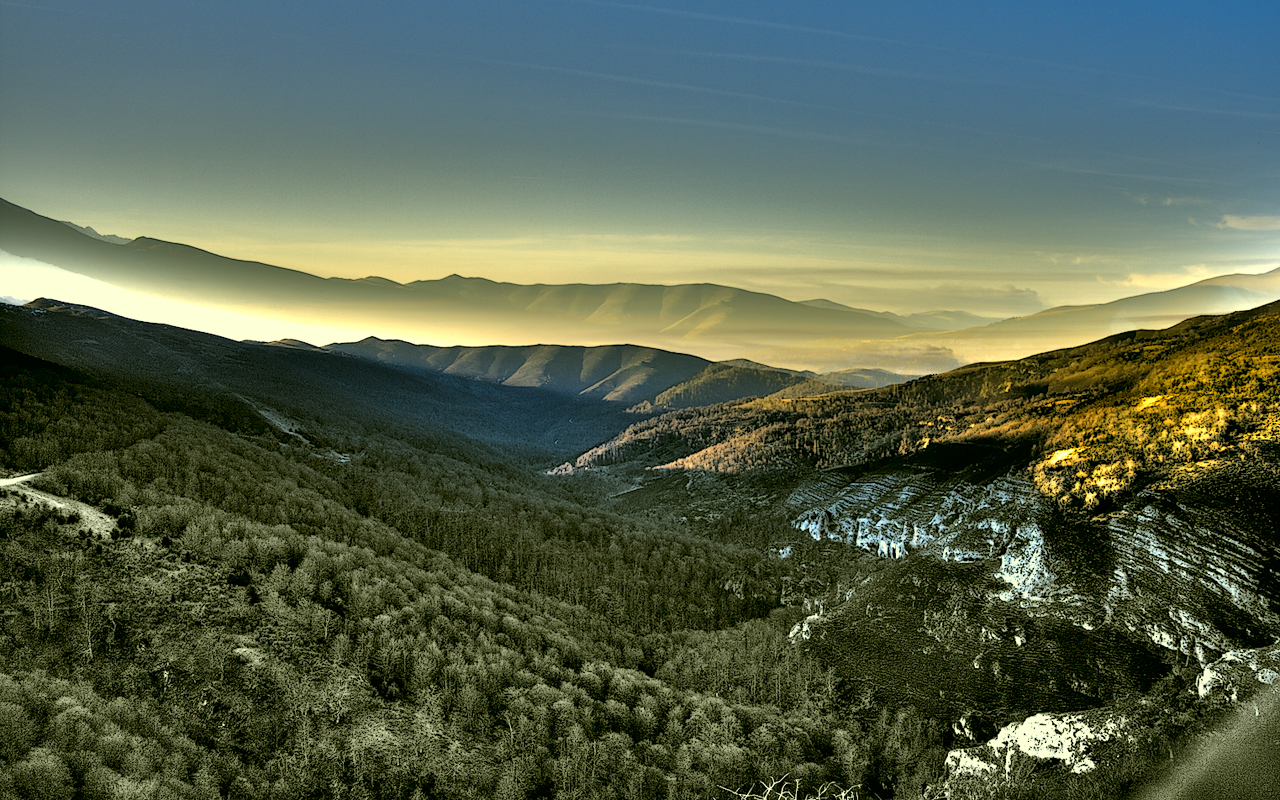
- Partial view of the Valley of Cabuérniga

- Location within Spain
- Location: Cantabria, Spain
- Nearest city: Villasuso (Anievas)
- Coordinates: 43°09′14″N 4°11′28″W
- Area: 245 km^{2} (95 sq mi)
- Established: 1988

Saja-Besaya Natural Park is Cantabria's largest natural park on the northern slope of the Cantabrian Mountains in West Central Cantabria, Spain. Its hunting reserve is approximately 1800km², the largest and most important in Spain.

== Geography ==
The Saja-Besaya Natural Park is located in the Western-central area of Cantabria, and is its largest park, covering an area of 24,500 hectares. It consists almost entirely of public land, with large amounts of native forest and about 568 hectares of private property. The park occupies six municipalities: Ruente, Cieza, Arenas de Iguñ, Cabuérniga, Los Tojos and Campoo de Suso.

There are two mountainous chains and their adjoining valleys: the watershed of the Saja and Besaya rivers in a south–north direction and coming from the Cantabrian Mountain Range and the northern slope of the Cordillera and with the maximum elevations of the Natural Park in its southwest end, Pico Iján (2087 m) and the Cueto del Cordel (2040 m). At the foot of these mountains are the pastures of the Puertos de Sejos. The dividing line between the Saja and the Besaya is formed by mountains with rounded shapes of medium altitude which are gaining height upon approach of the Cordillera at its southern end with Campoo. The axis of the mountain range that limits the South of the park increases in altitude traveling in east–west direction.

In terms of geology the conglomerates of "acastilladas" and reddish formations, called the "Molinucos del diablo" along Canal de Cureñas are some of the most visited points of interest. Morphological features include the fluvial with remains of glacial formations south of the Sierra del Cordel of the Cantabrian Mountains.

== Climate ==
The Atlantic climate is humid or oceanic temperate. There is regular rainfall, with an annual average of 1,500 mm, with less rainfall in the lowlands and in the Besaya mountains. The temperature is cool without seasonal abrupt changes, with a difference between winter and summer of about 10 or 12 degrees.

== Flora ==
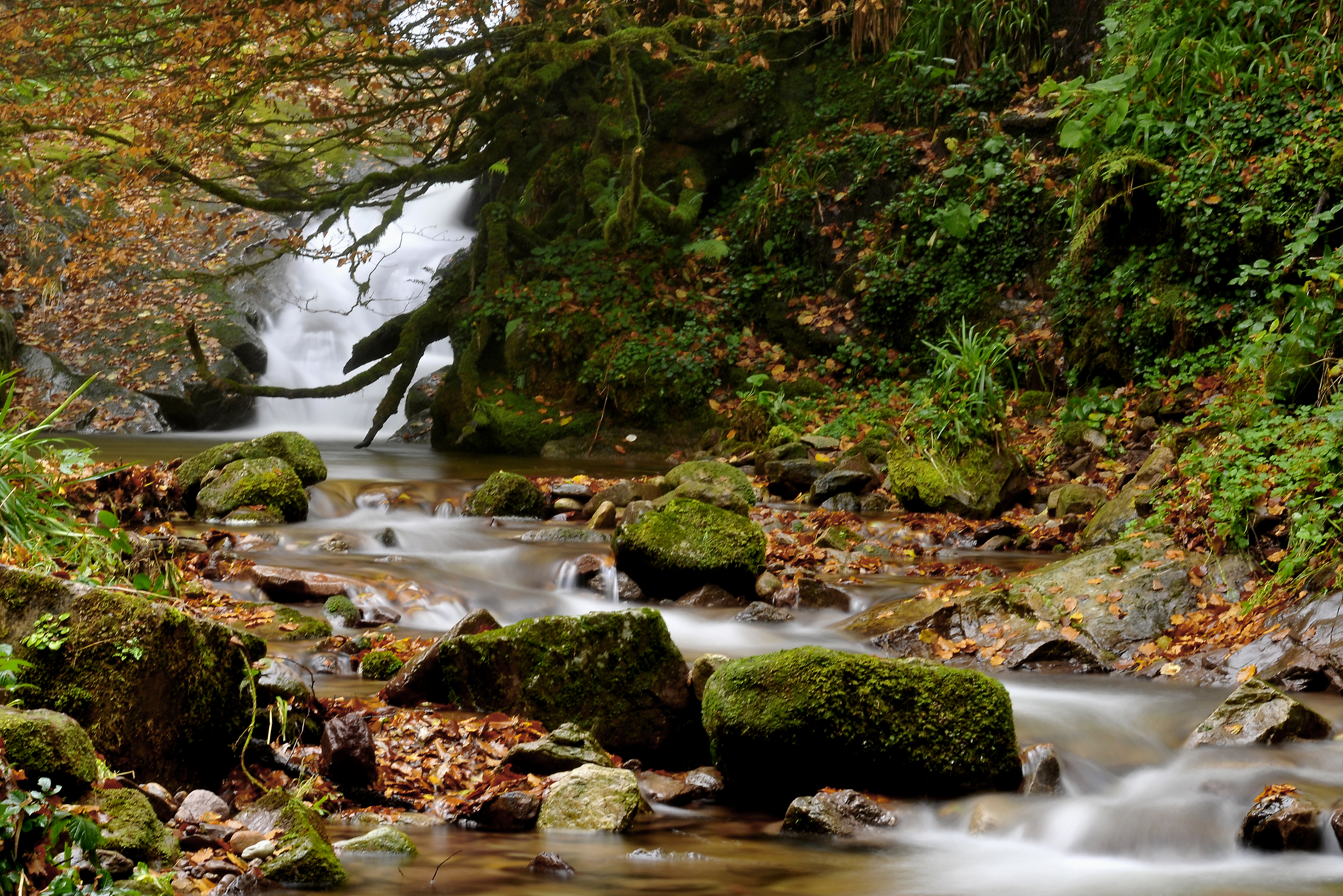
A section of the River Saja flowing through Los Tojos

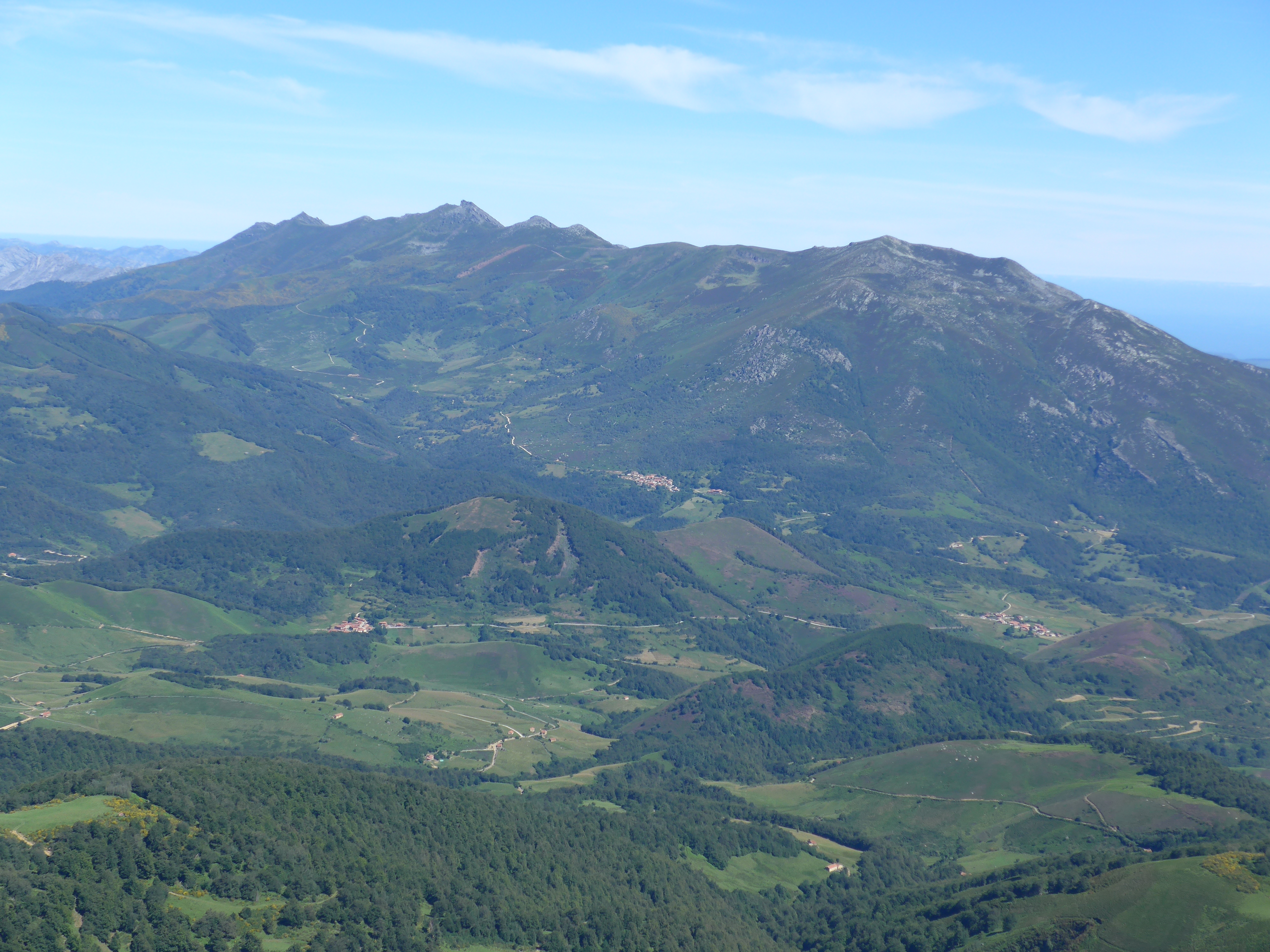
View of Polaciones and Peña Sagra

The main attraction of Saja-Besaya is its deciduous forest, the largest contiguous forest of the entire Cantabrian mountain range. A quarter of the park is covered by beech Fagus sylvatica and oak groves. The oak area of more than 6,000 ha. harbors three types, the most abundant is the common oak, Quercus robur, but also Quercus pyrenaica and Quercus petraea. The forest is characterized by a diversity of trees and associated shrubs such as chestnuts, ash, maples, hazelnuts, honeysuckle, and varied flowering and herbaceous plants. With increasing altitude between 700 and 1,500 m the beech appears under which few species are able to thrive, including eye-catching anemone, Erythronium or orchid species. Above 1,300 m. of altitude the holly trees (Ilex aquifolium) and birches (Betula pendula) take over. There are also some peat swamp areas of special ecological interest.

== Fauna ==
Mammals include deer, roe deer, fox, wild boar, otter, wolf and sporadic brown bear. Among the native vertebrates of the oak and beech forests, the red-fronted dormouse, the ermine and the wildcat are common.

The nature reserve is abundant with birds of more than 120 species, 100 of which are nesting. Migratory birds include the becada, the heron or the kingfisher. The royal owl inhabits the ravines the largest of the Iberian nocturnal raptors. The golden eagle can be observed in the high areas of the southern half. There are griffon vultures and peregrine falcons. Among fish, the common trout is the dominant species

The Iberian wolf is not very rare, and brown bears have been sighted, thus considering this zone as an important nexus of communication between isolated populations of this plantigrade. Other interesting species of animals that populate the area are: martens, badgers, stoats and desmans.

== Amenities ==
The park has a visitor center and six recreational areas named "La casa del Monte" in Ucieda, "Llano Castrillo" in Bárcena Mayor, "Cambillas" in Saja, "Cieza" in Cieza, "El Prauco" and "El Vaho" in Los Llares and the view point "La Cardosa", located on the CA-280 in direction of the port of Palombera, 4 km from the top at an altitude of 1000 meters. Ten hiking trails have been described.
