= Besaya Valley =

Coordinates: 43°15′57″N 4°02′50″W

Besaya
- Comarca
- Flag Coat of arms
- Country: Spain
- Autonomous community: Cantabria
- Province: Cantabria
- Capital: Torrelavega
- Municipalities: List: Suances, Polanco, Torrelavega, Cartes, Los Corrales de Buelna, San Felices de Buelna, Cieza, Arenas de Iguña, Anievas, Bárcena de Pie de Concha, Molledo

Area
  - Total: 432.1 km^{2} (166.8 sq mi)

Population (2018)
  - Total: 90,041
  - Density: 208.4/km^{2} (539.7/sq mi)
- Demonym: besayense
- Time zone: UTC+1 (CET)
  - Summer (DST): UTC+2 (CEST)

The Besaya valley (Spanish: Valle del Besaya) is both a comarca located in the center of Cantabria, along the course of the Besaya River, and the natural valley of said river. Its capital is Torrelavega.

== The Besaya River Basin ==
The Besaya River Basin is the largest in the region of Cantabria, covering about 396 square miles (1,030 km^{2}). The region annually receives 0.3 cubic miles (1.3 km^{3}) of precipitation. The Besaya River flows north into the Bay of Biscay. In some stretches of the river, the V-shaped valley and steep slopes lend themselves to dams that generate electricity. The lower sections of the river are prone to flooding.

== The Besaya Valley comarca ==
The comarca comprises eleven municipalities:

Name	Area (km^{2})	Population (2001)	Population (2011)	Population (2018)
Anievas	20.9	378	351	279
Arenas de Iguña	86.8	1,961	1,796	1,676
Bárcena de Pie de Concha	30.5	841	767	680
Cartes	19.0	3,645	5,534	5,778
Cieza	44.1	687	602	539
Los Corrales de Buelna	45.4	10,798	11,521	10,910
Molledo	71.1	1,848	1,616	1,544
Polanco	18.0	3,762	5,477	5,845
San Felices de Buelna	36.2	2,205	2,355	2,387
Suances	24.6	6,573	8,403	8,716
Torrelavega	35.5	55,477	55,125	51,687
