= Buelna (surname) =

Family name

- Pronunciation: /ˈbwɛlnə/

Origin
- Meaning: One from Buelna
- Region of origin: Spain

Other names
- Variant form: Buelnas

Buelna is a Spanish surname of Asturian or Cantabrian origin.

== Notable people with the surname ==
- Lorenzo Buelna (born 1980), former Mexican baseball player
- Rafael Buelna (1890–1924), Mexican general

== See also ==
- Buelna
- Los Corrales de Buelna
- San Felices de Buelna
