= Buelna =

- Locality
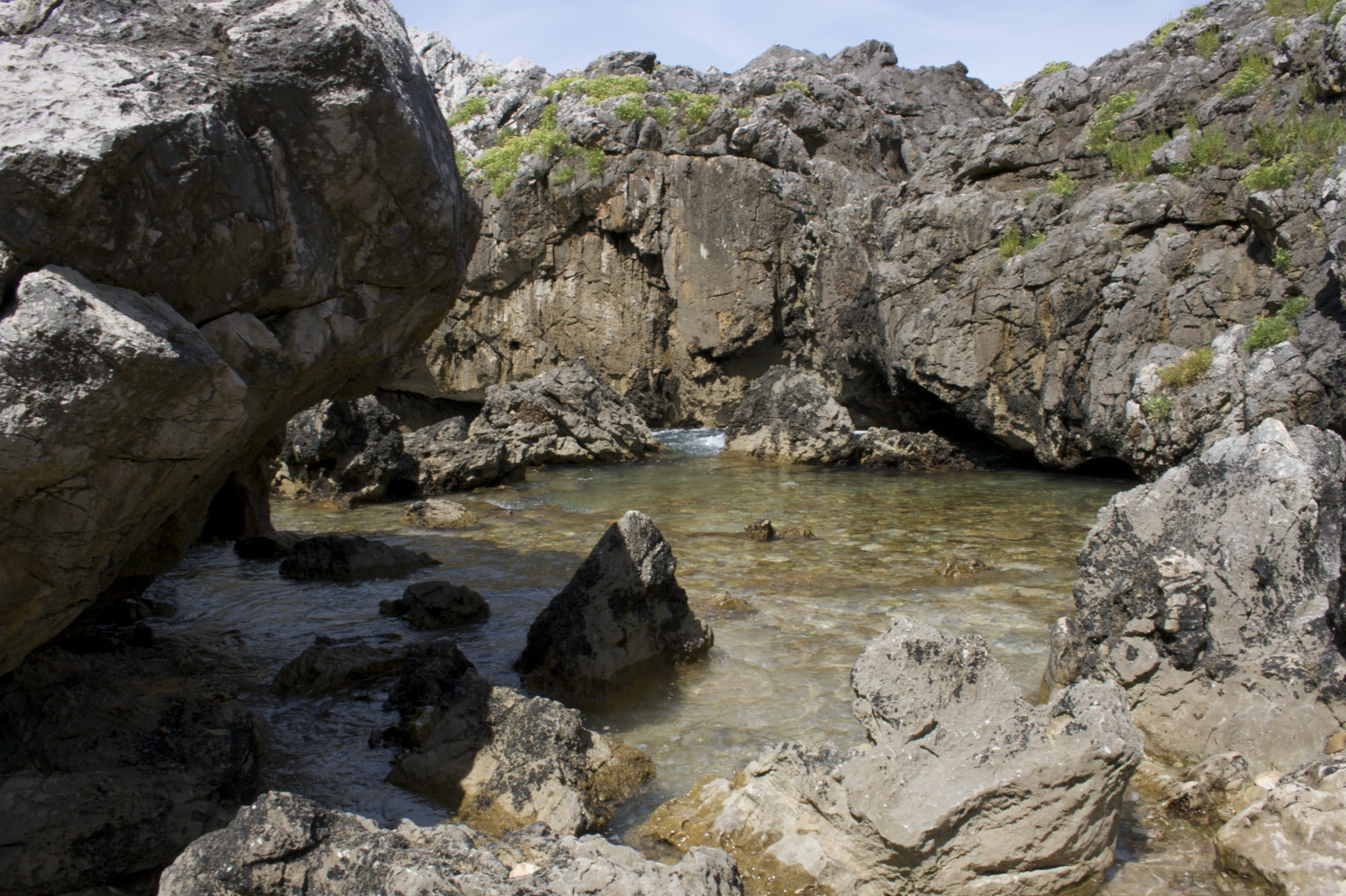

- Location within Pendueles Buelna (Spain)
- Coordinates: 43°23′37″N 4°36′57″W
- Country: Spain
- Autonomous community: Asturias
- Province: Asturias
- Municipality: Llanes

Dimensions
  - Width: 20 km (12 mi)
- Elevation: 217 m (712 ft)

Population (2023)
  - Total: 47
- Demonym: Buelnan
- Time zone: UTC+1 (CET)
  - Summer (DST): UTC+2 (CEST)
- Postal code: 33598

Buelna is one of two lugares in Pendueles, the other one also named Pendueles. It has suffered a population decrease, coming from 79 people in 2010 to 47 people in 2023. It is known for its beach, 600 m. away from the town and its traditional Asturian houses.

== History ==
The Church of Santa María de Buelna was home to the Count of Valle de Pendueles.

== Etymology ==
The term Buelna can date back to 978, first found as Ŏlna, which then evolved to Ulna, then entered diphthongisation as Huelna or Uelna, and after became Buelna. The terms may be from the Proto-Indo European root *orn-a (water that shakes).

== See also ==
- Buelna (surname)
- Los Corrales de Buelna
