= San Cristóbal, Cantabria =

Coordinates: 43°11′34″N 4°04′36″W

San Cristóbal is a town in the Arenas de Iguña municipality of the Spanish region of Cantabria. The town is also known as Valdeiguña. In the year 2004 its population was 181. San Cristóbal borders Cohiño to the north and is 2.6 kilometers (1.6 mi) from the capital of the municipality, Arenas de Iguña, and 210 meters (689 feet) above sea level. The town used to belong to the historical municipality of Valdeiguña, and San Cristóbal has been documented since the Middle Ages when it was included in the Cartulary of Santillana.
