= Masters M55 10000 metres world record progression =

Progression of world record improvements

This is the progression of world record improvements of the 10000 metres M55 division of Masters athletics.

Key

Incomplete information Pending

Hand	Auto	Athlete	Nationality	Birthdate	Location	Date
	31:51.86	Keith Bateman	Australia	29.06.1955	Sydney	26.03.2011
32:15.2		Sergio Fernández Infestas	Spain	30.07.1955	Los Corrales de Buelna	19.03.2011
32:27.7		Michael Hager	United Kingdom	06.09.1950	Gloucester	23.08.2006
	32:38.92	Rolf Conzelmann	Germany	19.08.1932	Stuttgart	02.10.1988
32:48.8		Günther Hesselmann	Germany	03.08.1925	Essen	09.09.1980
33:36.2		Jack Ryan	Australia	30.04.1922	Melbourne	1979
33:40.0		John Gilmour	Australia	03.05.1919	Perth	05.08.1974
