= Cieza =

Cieza can refer to:

- Pedro Cieza de León, primary source historian of Incan Peru at the time of the Spanish conquest.
- Cieza, Murcia, a municipality of autonomous community of Murcia, Spain
- Cieza, Cantabria, a municipality of autonomous community of Cantabria, Spain
