= Pedredo =

Town in Spain

Coordinates: 43°11′47″N 04°38′36″W

Pedredo is a town in the Arenas de Iguña municipality of the Spanish region of Cantabria. In the year 2004 its population was 239. Pedredo is located 1.8 kilometers (1.1 mi) from the capital of the municipality, Arenas de Iguña, and 200 meters (656 feet) above sea level. There has been a parish church located in the center of Pedredo since the 17th century. The town is also the birthplace of the bell founder Pedro Buenaga Pernía (1917-2001).
