= Anievas =

- Municipality
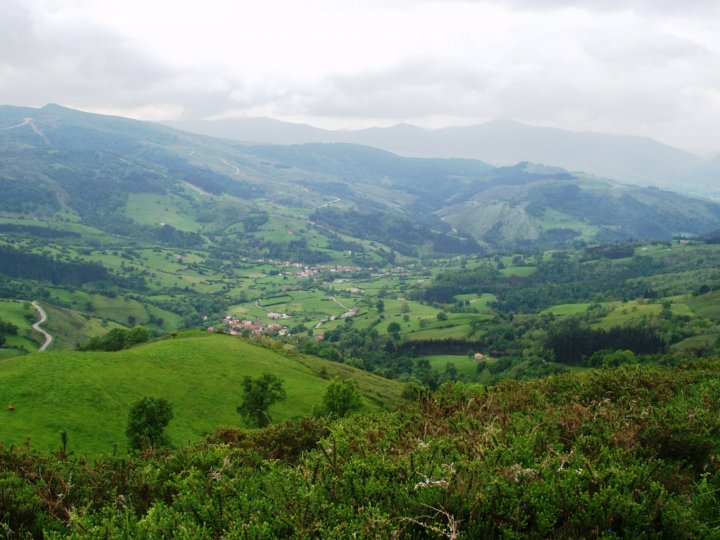

- Flag Coat of arms

- Location within Cantabria Anievas (Spain)
- Coordinates: 43°12′11″N 4°0′2″W
- Country: Spain
- Autonomous community: Cantabria
- Province: Cantabria
- Comarca: Besaya valley
- Judicial district: Torrelavega
- Capital: Cotillo

Government
  - Alcalde: José Díaz Gómez (2007) (PP)

Area
  - Total: 20.90 km^{2} (8.07 sq mi)
- Elevation: 268 m (879 ft)

Population (2025-01-01)
  - Total: 274
  - Density: 13.1/km^{2} (34.0/sq mi)
- Time zone: UTC+1 (CET)
  - Summer (DST): UTC+2 (CEST)
- Postal code: 39451
- Website: Official website

Anievas is a municipality located in the autonomous community of Cantabria, Spain. According to the 2007 census, the city has a population of 12.919 inhabitants. Its capital is Cotillo.

== Towns ==
- Barriopalacio
- Cotillo (Capital)
- Calga
- Villasuso
