= Los Tojos =

- Municipality
- Location of Los Tojos

- Location in Spain
- Coordinates: 43°9′22″N 4°15′6″W
- Country: Spain
- Autonomous community: Cantabria
- Province: Cantabria
- Comarca: Saja-Nansa
- Judicial district: Torrelavega
- Capital: Los Tojos

Government
  - Alcalde: María Belén Ceballos de la Herrán

Area
  - Total: 89.5 km^{2} (34.6 sq mi)
- Elevation: 640 m (2,100 ft)

Population (2025-01-01)
  - Total: 369
  - Density: 4.12/km^{2} (10.7/sq mi)
- Time zone: UTC+1 (CET)
  - Summer (DST): UTC+2 (CEST)

Los Tojos is a municipality located in the autonomous community of Cantabria, Spain.

== Localities ==
Its 449 inhabitants (INE, 2010) live in:

- Bárcena Mayor, 86 hab.
- Correpoco, 51 hab.
- Saja, 104 hab.
- El Tojo, 88 hab.
- Los Tojos (Capital), 120 hab.
