= Bárcena Mayor =

Coordinates: 43°09′N 4°11′W

- Village
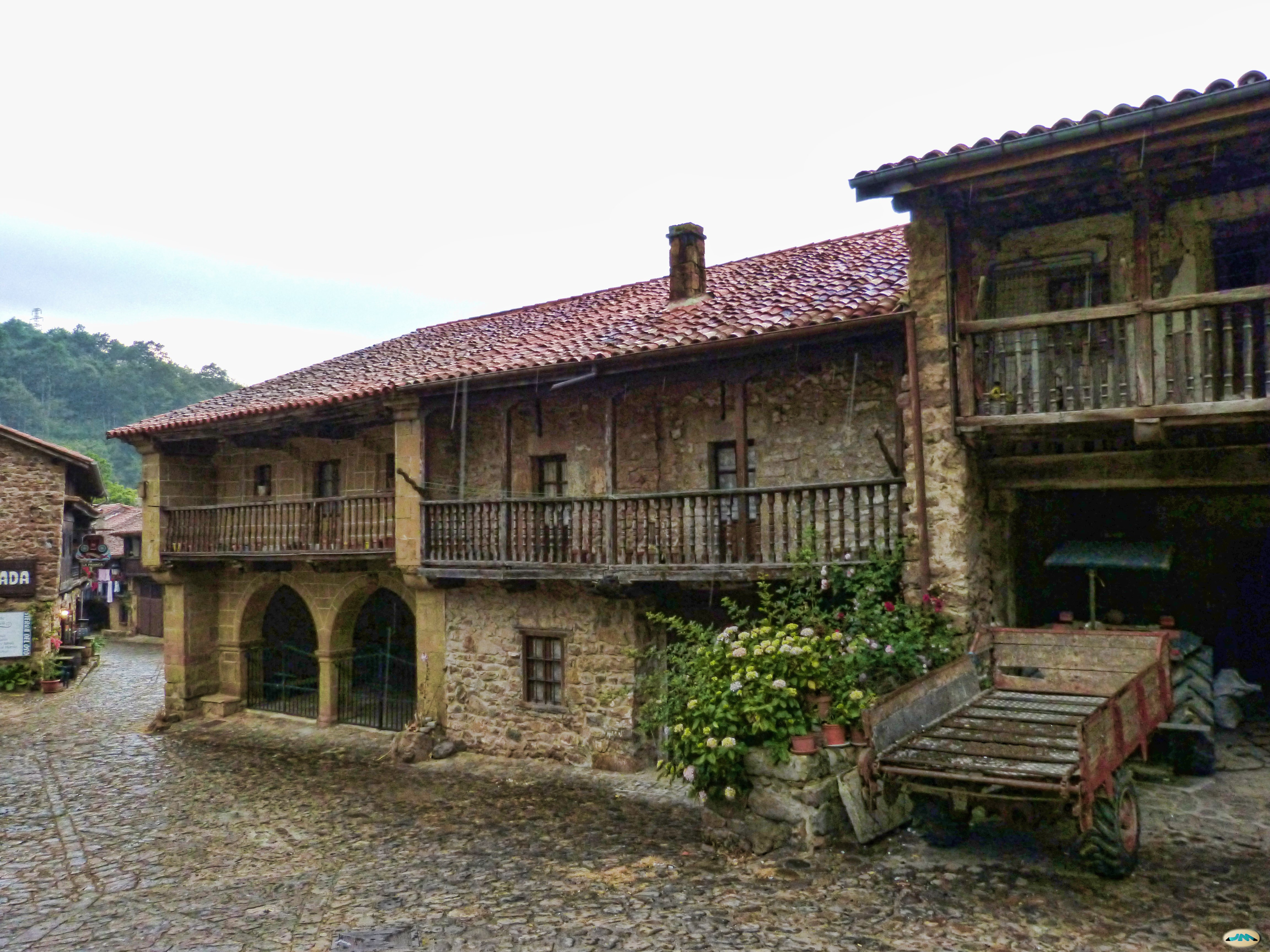
- Interactive map of Bárcena Mayor
- Country: Spain
- Autonomous community: Cantabria
- Municipality: Los Tojos

Spanish Cultural Heritage
- Type: Non-movable
- Criteria: Historic ensemble
- Designated: 7 December 1979
- Reference no.: RI-53-0000228

Bárcena Mayor is a village nestled in the mountains of Cantabria, Spain in the municipality of Los Tojos, and is the only residential village within Saja Reservation within the Saja and Nansa valleys community.

== Overview ==
The Argoza River cuts through this complex, an example of the medieval, rural Cantabrian villages. Said by the Cantabrian tourist bureaus to be the oldest town in Cantabria, it was declared a historic-artistic site in 1979 because of its state of preservation. With the declaration, funds were made available to repair the access road leading to it to make it easier for tourists to get to making it the end of the road (the road being CA-817, or Cantabria Provincial route 817). The road is in good condition, but the height of the surrounding mountains brings an early onset to dusk and a late dawn. It is known not only for its rustic architecture but also for its rural cuisine, such as, cocido montañés or game meat. Only residents may drive motor vehicles through the village, so most tour guides and advisers recommend walking through its streets to see its medieval character and look up at the surrounding mountains. It is now one of the most visited towns in the Cantabrian interior.

In the town, one can find an ancient Roman Road that has been in continual use for almost two millennia. The houses and buildings are examples of the rural medieval stone mountain construction with wooden balconies and windows.

To maximize the heating effect of the sun, most of the buildings face the south. The village contains historic laundries in the public square, bakeries, barns, stables, carpentry shops, gift shops, and restaurants. Local cattle can be heard in their pastures ringing the bells draped from their necks as they graze. The architecture shows early forms of the woodworking that became a distinguishing facet of Cantabrian architecture, the wooden balcony. As well as the balconies, local woodworkers produce cattle yokes, sandals, canes, and cutlery that are distinctive to rural Cantabria.

During the 1920s through the 1970s, it was a favorite hunting site for wealthy sportsmen who liked the seclusion and the abundance of wild game. It was also a popular spot for the hunting of Iberian bears and wolves before they became endangered. The lack of opportunity for local youth and its remoteness was leading to a population decline heading toward its abandonment until the government's injection of funds to make it a tourist destination in 1979. Many hiking trails lead out of the village up into the mountains. The terrain is quite steep but verdant with much local fauna passing through.

== Gallery ==
Bárcena Mayor, Cantabria, Spain

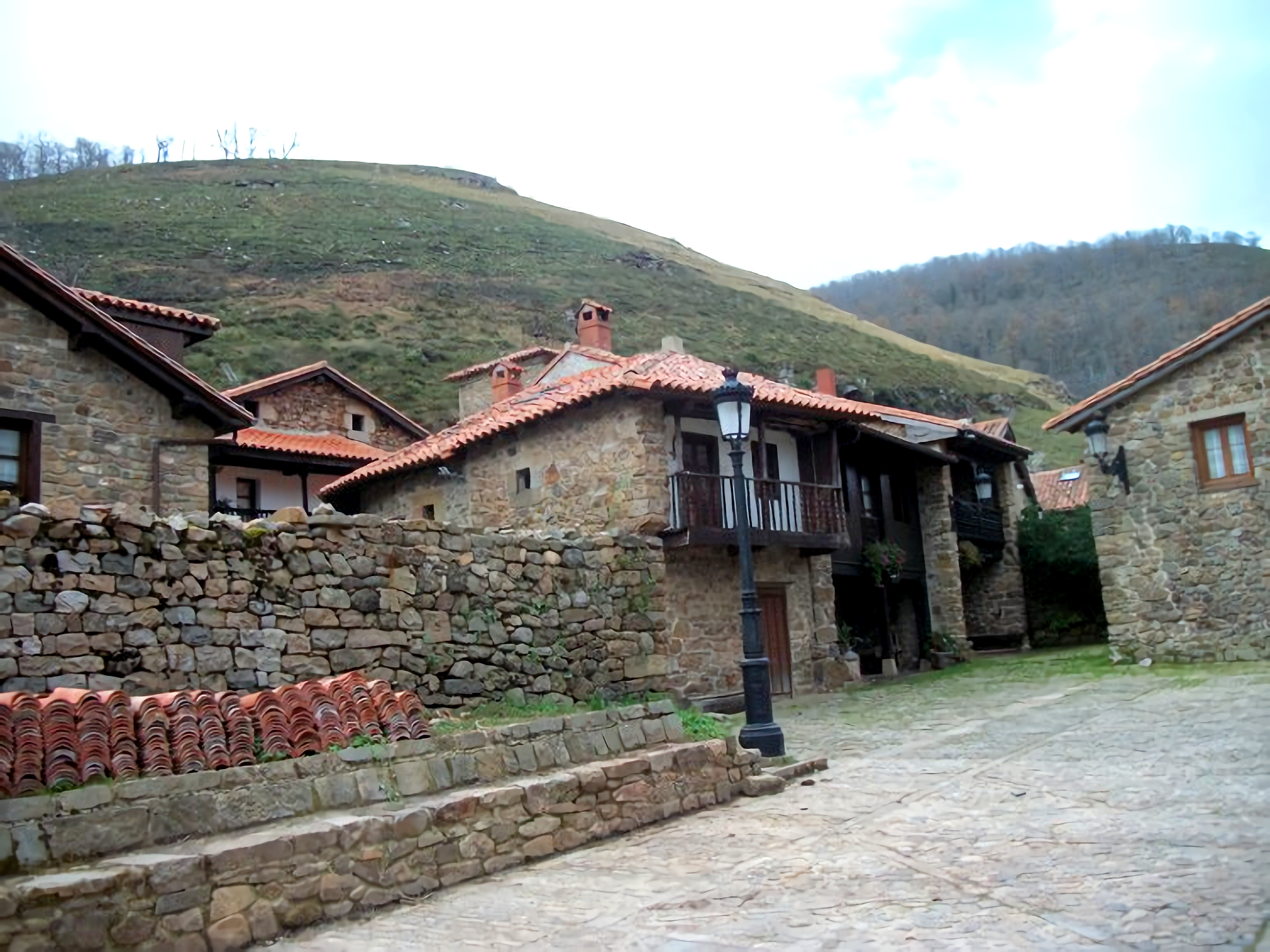
Bárcena Mayor, 39518, Cantabria, Spain

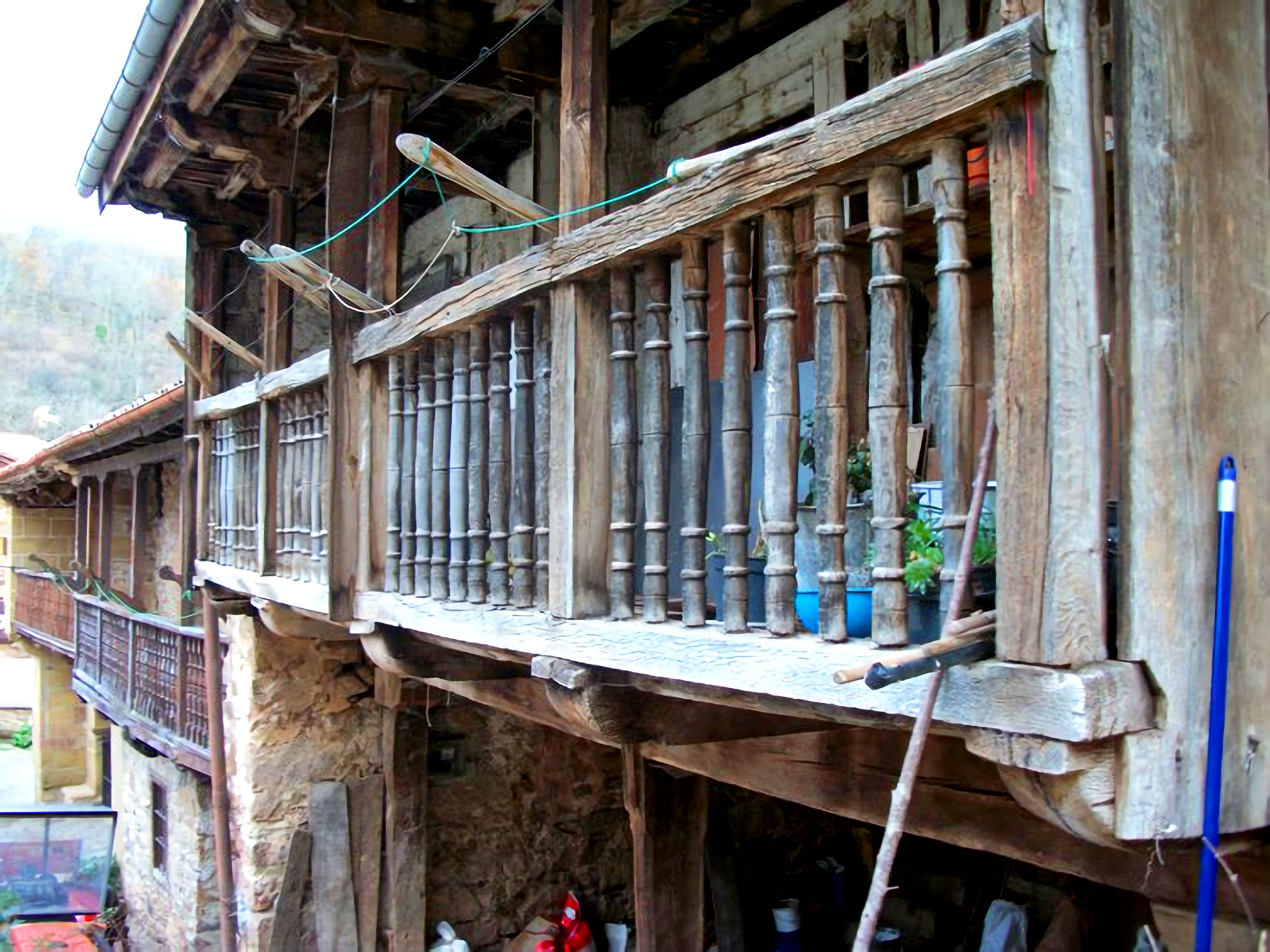
Bárcena Mayor, 39518, Cantabria, Spain

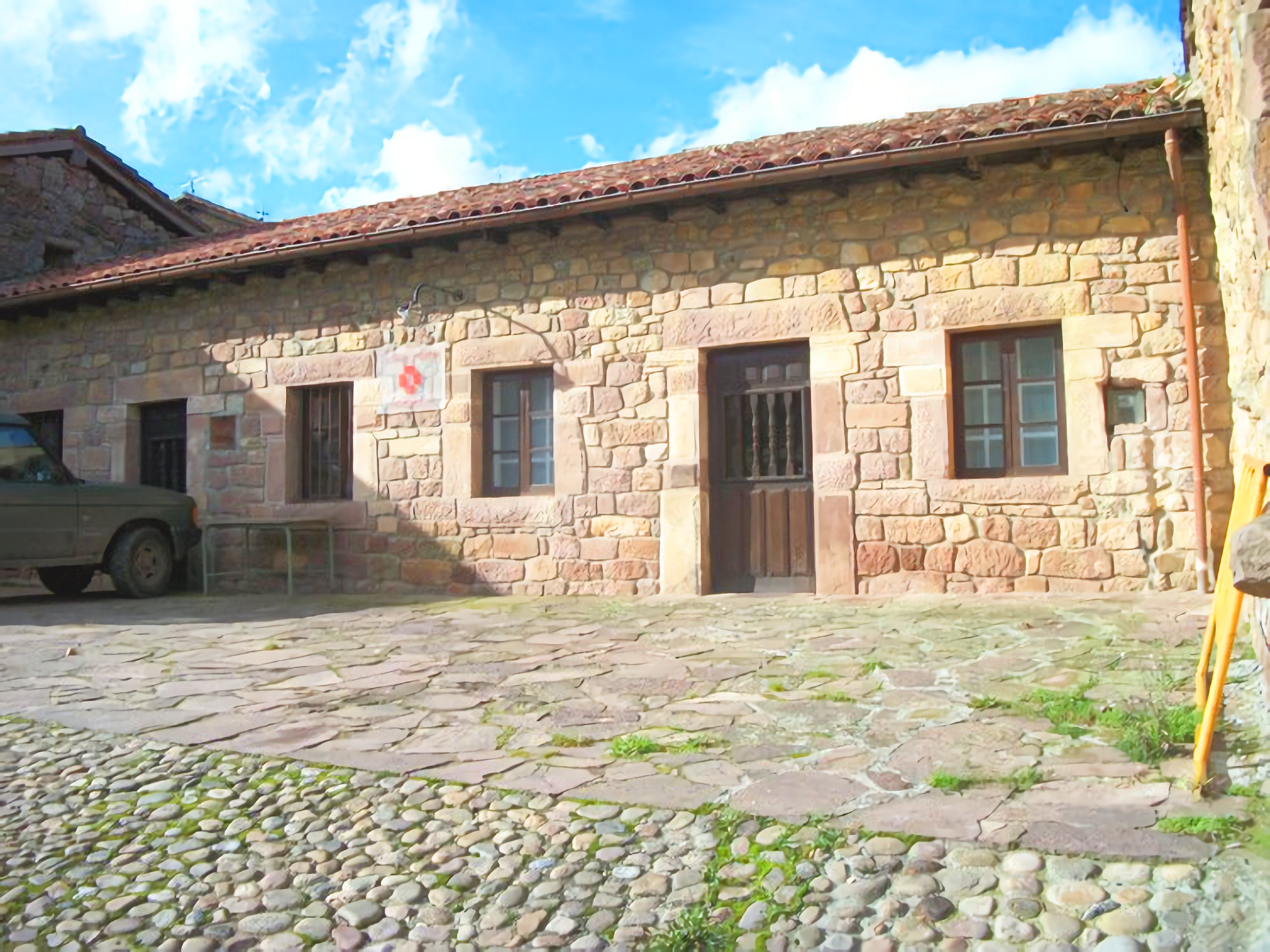
Bárcena Mayor, 39518, Cantabria, Spain

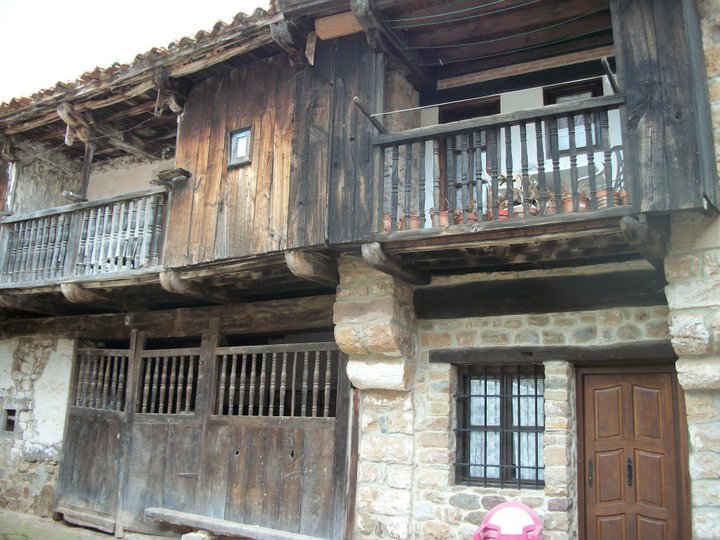
Bárcena Mayor, 39518, Cantabria, Spain

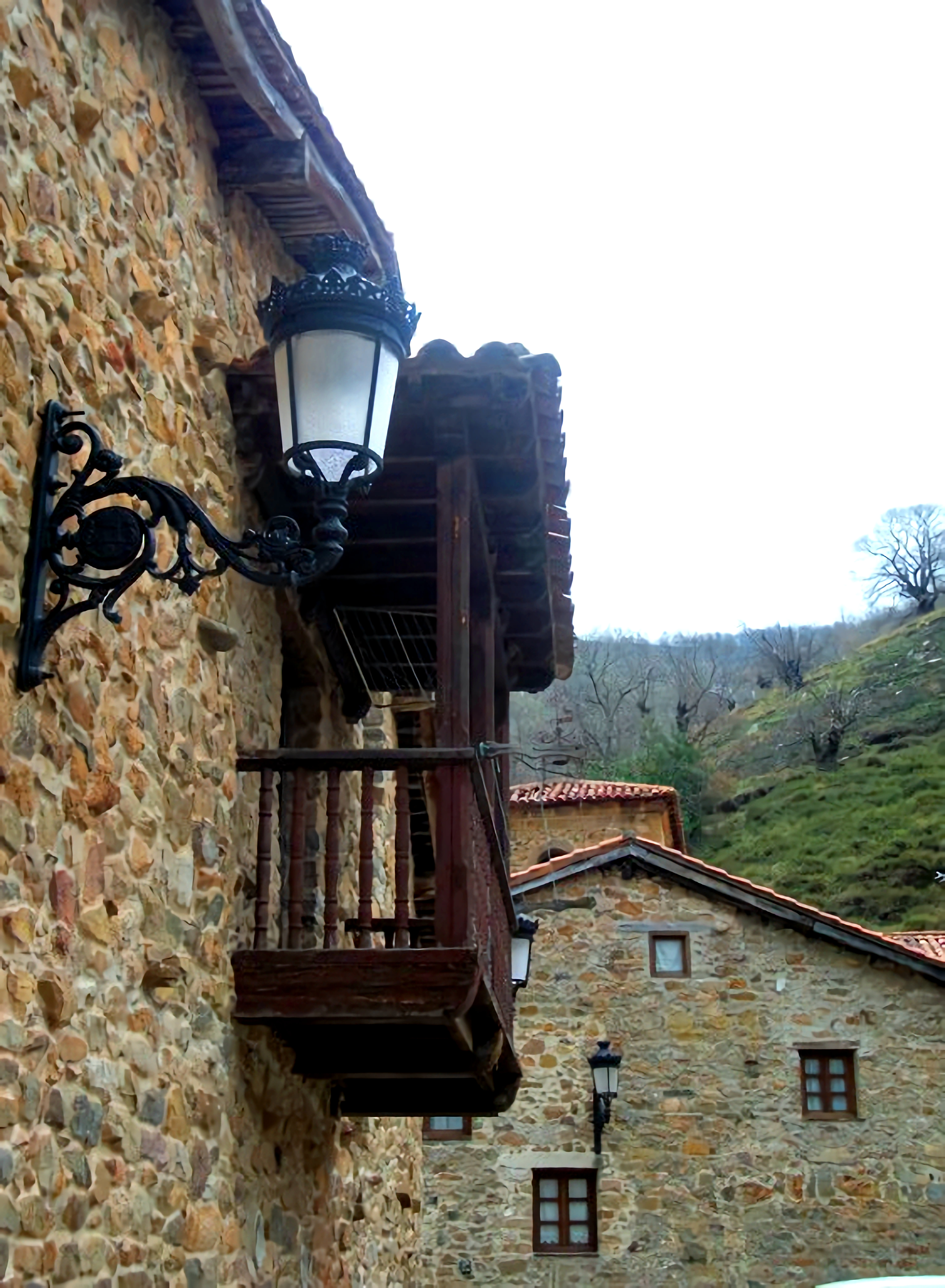
Bárcena Mayor, 39518, Cantabria, Spain

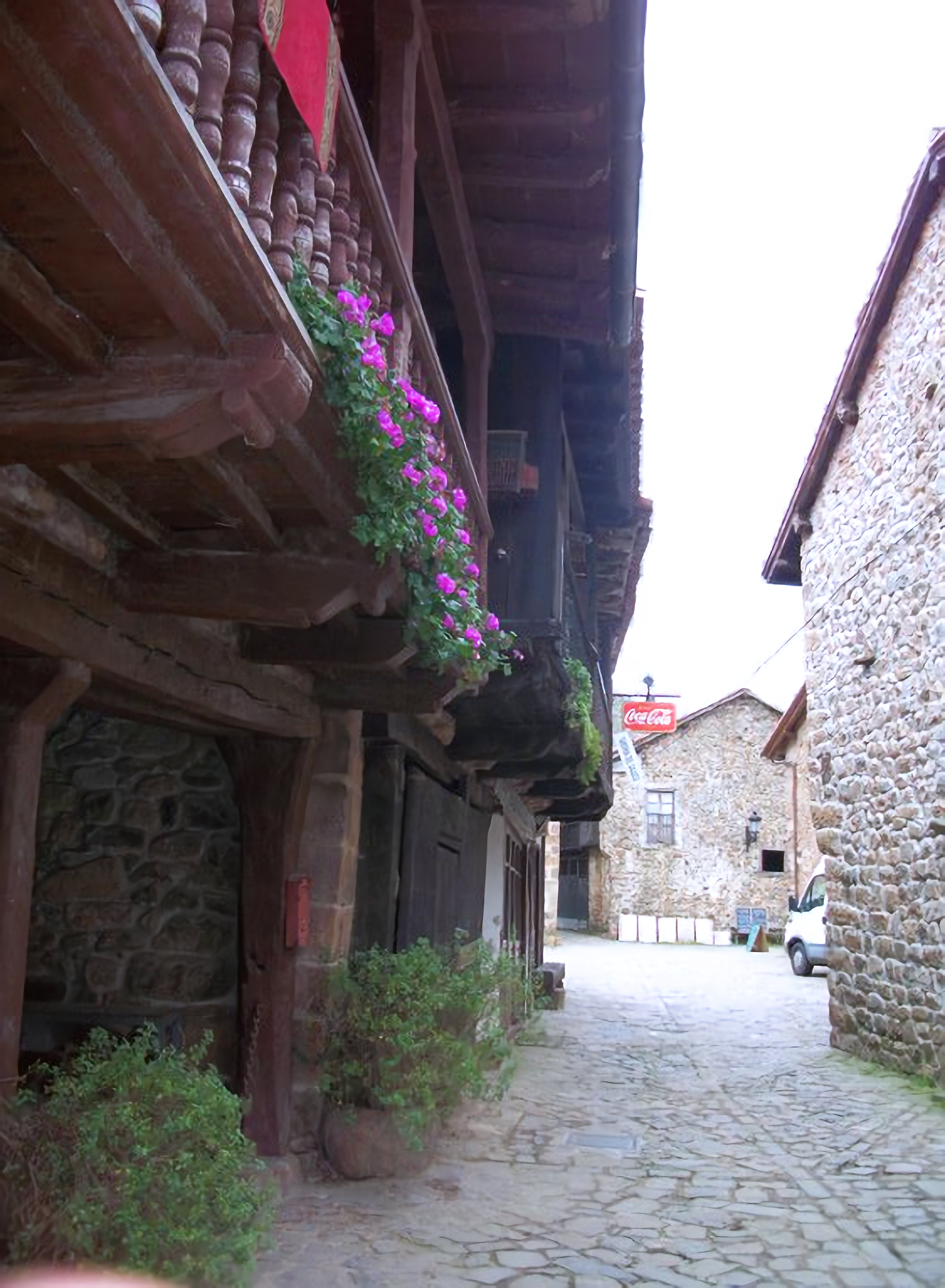
Bárcena Mayor, 39518, Cantabria, Spain
