= Palacio, Cantabria =

Coordinates: 43°11′22″N 4°40′04″W

Palacio is a town in the Arenas de Iguña municipality of the Spanish region of Cantabria. In the year 2004 its population was 45. Palacio is located just north of the los Llares river and is 1.5 kilometers (0.93 mi) from the capital of the municipality, Arenas de Iguña, and 205 meters (673 feet) above sea level.
