= Las Fraguas =

Coordinates: 43°11′35″N 4°33′56″W

Las Fraguas is a town in the Arenas de Iguña municipality of the Spanish region of Cantabria. The population of Las Fraguas was 166 as of the year 2004. The town is located 0.6 kilometers (0.37 mi) from the municipality capital, Arenas de Iguña, and 180 meters (591 feet) above sea level. The Palace of Las Fraguas (El Palacio de los Hornillos), where The Others was filmed, can be found here. Within the palace are the Praying Sculptures of the Acebedos, which were declared to be of special cultural significance in 2003. The sculptures have been dated to the 17th century, when they belonged to the now ruined Palace of the Acebedos in the municipality of Entrambasaguas.
