= Bárcena de Pie de Concha =

- Town and Municipality
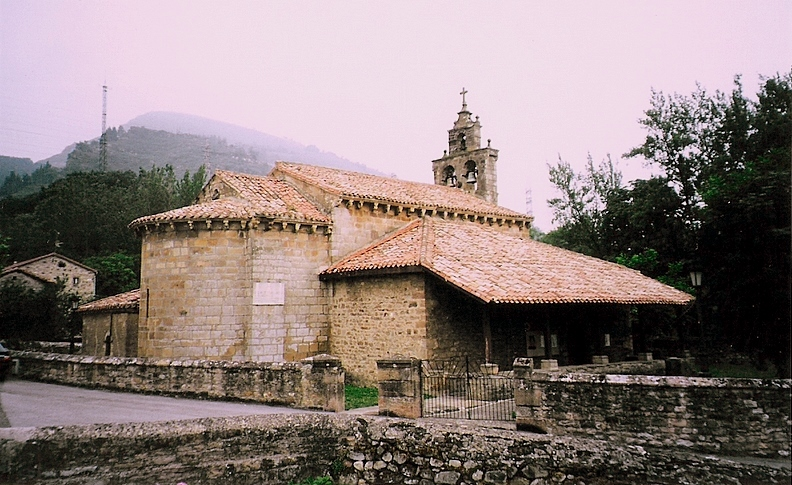
- Church of San Cosme y Damián (12th century)

- Flag Coat of arms

- Location within Cantabria Bárcena de Pie de Concha (Spain)
- Coordinates: 43°07′36″N 4°03′17″W
- Country: Spain
- Autonomous community: Cantabria
- Province: Cantabria
- Comarca: Besaya valley
- Judicial district: Torrelavega
- Seat: Bárcena de Pie de Concha

Government
  - Alcalde: Agustín Mantecón González(2015) (PRC)

Area
  - Total: 30.53 km^{2} (11.79 sq mi)
- Elevation: 288 m (945 ft)

Population (2025-01-01)
  - Total: 675
  - Density: 22.1/km^{2} (57.3/sq mi)
- Time zone: UTC+1 (CET)
  - Summer (DST): UTC+2 (CEST)
- Website: www.aytobarcenapc.com

Bárcena de Pie de Concha is a municipality that is located in the autonomous community of Cantabria, Spain. According to the 2024 census, there were 674 inhabitants as compared to the 2007 census where the city recorded a population of 825 inhabitants.

== Towns ==
- Bárcena de Pie de Concha (Seat)
- Pie de Concha
- Pujayo
- Montabliz (abandoned)

== Notable people ==
- Luis Araquistáin (1886 – Geneva, Switzerland, 1959) was a Spanish politician and writer.

== Gallery ==
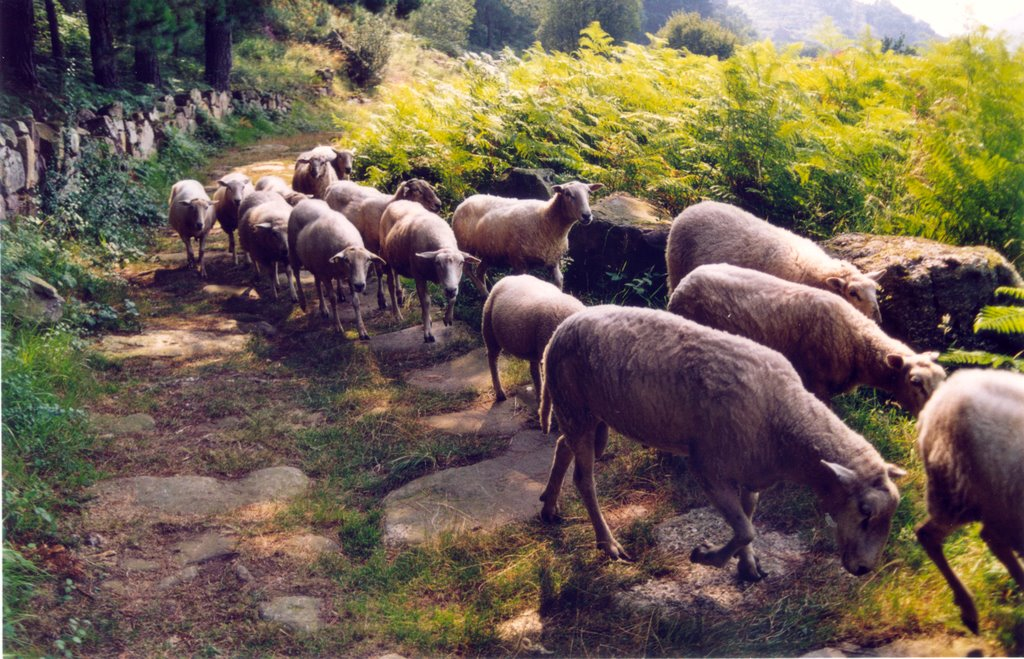
Herd of sheep on the Roman road
