= La Serna de Iguña =

Town in Arenas de Iguña, Spain

Coordinates: 43°10′22″N 4°25′30″W

La Serna is a town in the Arenas de Iguña municipality of the Spanish region of Cantabria. In 2004, La Serna had a population of 238. The town is located 2.4 kilometers (1.5 mi) from the municipality capital, Arenas de Iguña, and 210 m (689 feet) above sea level. The church of the Assumption, from the 11th century, and the house of Quevedo Bustamante, from the 17th century, can be found in La Serna.
