= Bostronizo =

Town in Arenas de Iguña, Spain

Coordinates: 43°12′N 4°02′W

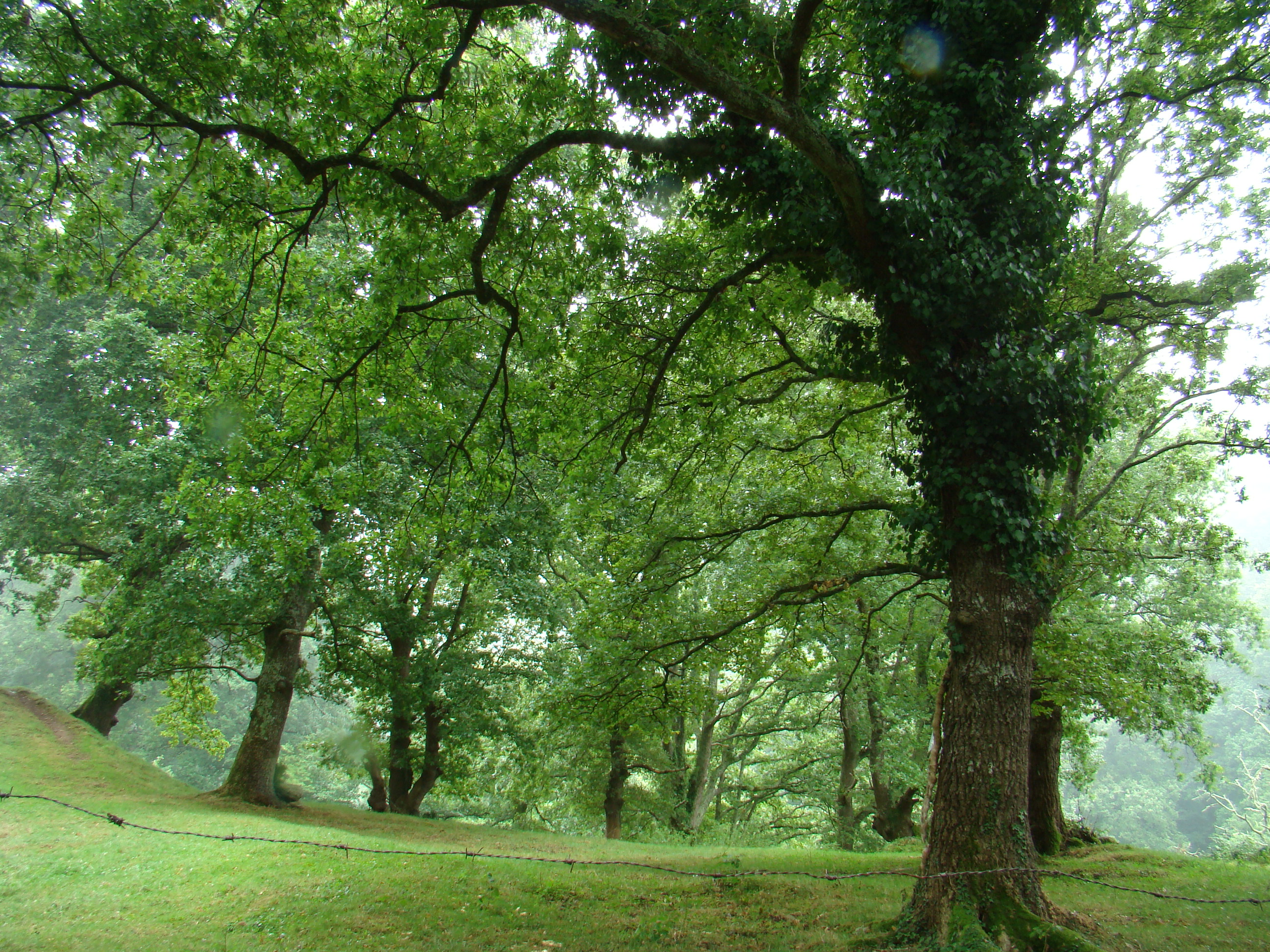
Photo of the area surrounding the Romanesque hermitage of San Román de Moroso in Bostronizo.

Bostronizo is a town in the Arenas de Iguña municipality of the Spanish region of Cantabria. In the year 2004 its population was 137. Bostronizo is located 2.8 kilometers (1.7 mi) from the capital of the municipality, Arenas de Iguña, and 425 meters (1,394 feet) above sea level. The church of San Román de Moroso, registered as a cultural heritage site and protected since 1931, can be found here. The church is one of the few remaining examples of Mozarabic architecture in the Cantabria region and is believed to have been constructed in the 10th century.
