= San Vicente de León =

Coordinates: 43°11′N 4°05′W

San Vicente de León is a town in the Arenas de Iguña municipality of the Spanish region of Cantabria. The town, which included 51 residences as of 2004, is located on a hilltop 4.5 kilometers (2.8 mi) west of the capital of the municipality, Arenas de Iguña, and 449 meters (1,473 feet) above sea level.
