= Arenas de Iguña =

- Municipality
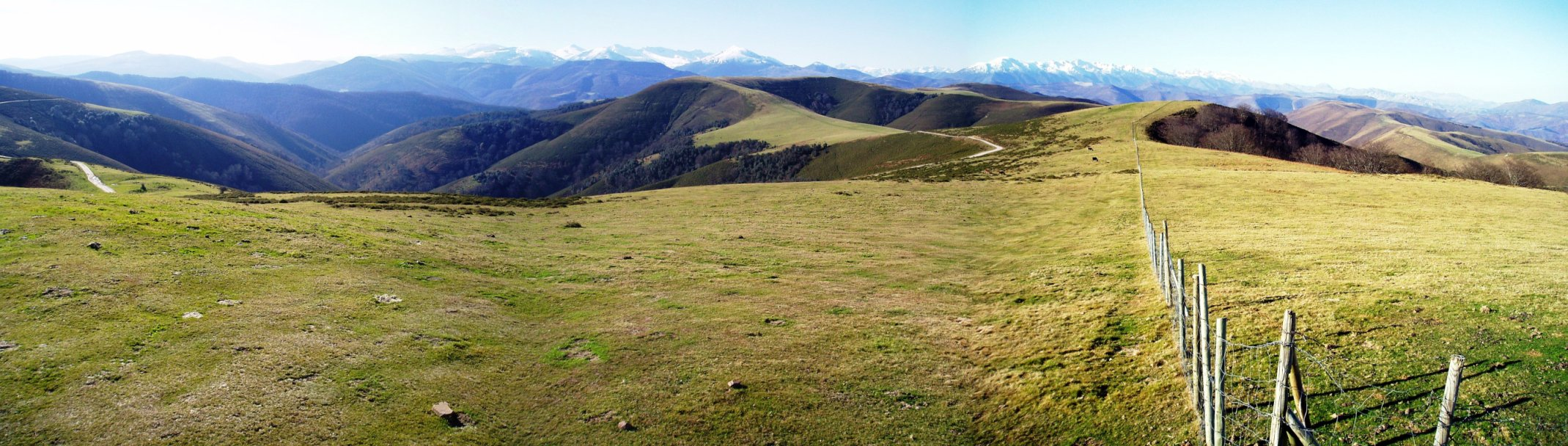
- Tordías Peak, Arenas de Iguña

- Flag Coat of arms

- Location within Cantabria Arenas de Iguña (Spain)
- Coordinates: 43°11′17″N 4°2′54″W
- Country: Spain
- Autonomous community: Cantabria
- Province: Cantabria
- Comarca: Besaya valley
- Judicial district: Torrelavega

Government
  - Mayor: Ramón Morais Vallés (2007) (PP)

Area
  - Total: 86.82 km^{2} (33.52 sq mi)
- Elevation: 177 m (581 ft)

Population (2025-01-01)
  - Total: 1,735
  - Density: 19.98/km^{2} (51.76/sq mi)
- Time zone: UTC+1 (CET)
  - Summer (DST): UTC+2 (CEST)
- Postal code: 39450
- Website: Official website

Arenas de Iguña is a municipality located in the autonomous community of Cantabria, Spain. According to the 2007 census, the city has a population of 1,927 inhabitants.

== Towns ==
- Arenas de Iguña (Capital)
- Bostronizo
- Cohiño
- Las Fraguas
- Los Llares
- Palacio
- Pedredo
- San Cristóbal
- San Juan de Raicedo
- San Vicente de León
- Santa Águeda
- La Serna de Iguña
