= Polanco, Spain =

Polanco
- Municipality
- Flag Coat of arms

- Location of Polanco

- Location in Spain
- Coordinates: 43°23′9″N 4°0′54″W
- Country: Spain
- Autonomous community: Cantabria
- Province: Cantabria
- Comarca: Besaya Valley
- Judicial district: Torrelavega
- Capital: Polanco

Government
  - Alcalde: Julio Cabrero Carral

Area
  - Total: 17.55 km^{2} (6.78 sq mi)
- Elevation: 50 m (160 ft)

Population (2025-01-01)
  - Total: 6,304
  - Density: 359.2/km^{2} (930.3/sq mi)
- Time zone: UTC+1 (CET)
  - Summer (DST): UTC+2 (CEST)

Polanco is a municipality located in the autonomous community of Cantabria, Spain. It has a population of 5,585 inhabitants (2013).
