= San Juan de Raicedo =

Coordinates: 43°11′28″N 4°26′11″W

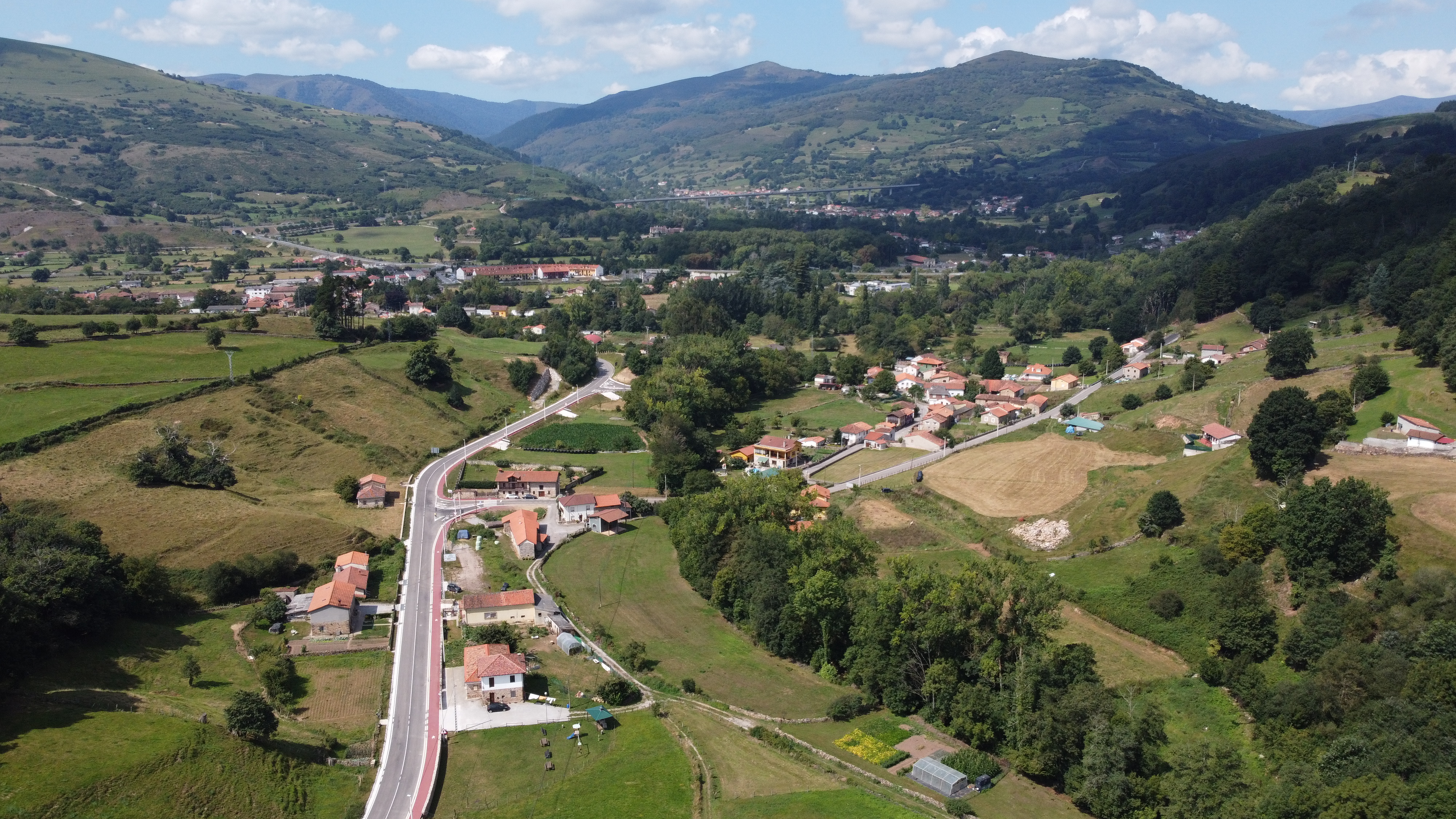
San Juan de Raicedo

San Juan de Raicedo is a town in the Arenas de Iguña municipality of the Spanish region of Cantabria. The town's population was 138 as of 2004. San Juan de Raicedo is located 0.6 kilometers (0.37 mi) from the capital of the municipality, Arenas de Iguña, and 180 meters (591 feet) above sea level. A Roman church, built during the first half of the 12th century upon older foundations, can be found in this village. The church was registered as a cultural heritage site and has been protected since 2002.
