= Cartes =

- Municipality
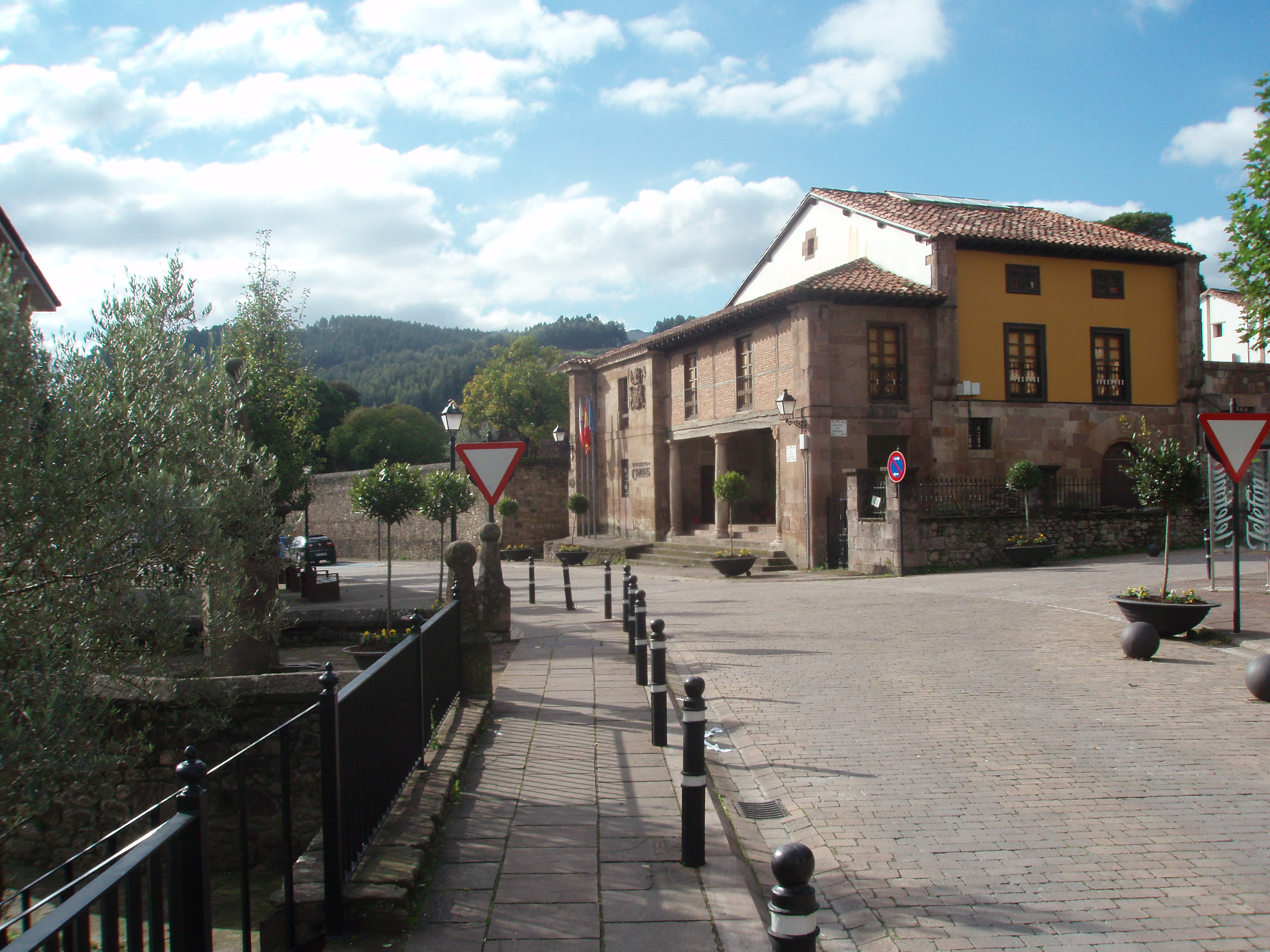
- Cartes' Consistorial House

- Coat of arms

- Location of Cartes

- Location within Cantabria Cartes (Spain)
- Coordinates: 43°19′32″N 4°4′5″W
- Country: Spain
- Autonomous community: Cantabria
- Province: Cantabria
- Comarca: Besaya valley
- Judicial district: Torrelavega
- Capital: Cartes

Government
  - Alcalde: Saturnino Castanedo Saiz (2007) (PSC-PSOE)

Area
  - Total: 19.02 km^{2} (7.34 sq mi)
- Elevation: 40 m (130 ft)

Population (2025-01-01)
  - Total: 5,874
  - Density: 308.8/km^{2} (799.9/sq mi)
- Time zone: UTC+1 (CET)
  - Summer (DST): UTC+2 (CEST)
- Postal code: 39311
- Website: Official website

Cartes is a municipality located in the autonomous community of Cantabria, Spain. According to the 2009 census, the city has a population of 5.118 inhabitants.
