= Santillana del Mar =

- Municipality
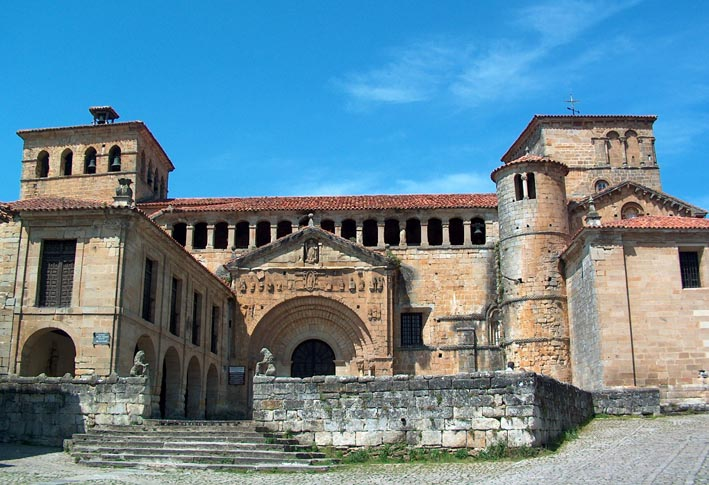
- Church of the Colegiata in Santillana

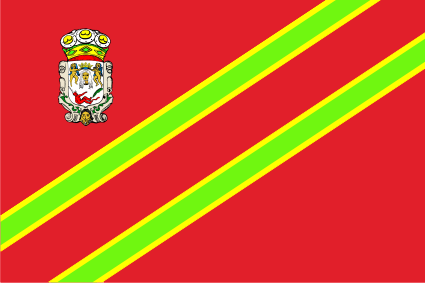
- Flag Coat of arms

- Location of Santillana del Mar

- Location in Spain
- Coordinates: 43°23′36″N 4°6′17″W
- Country: Spain
- Autonomous community: Cantabria
- Province: Cantabria
- Comarca: Western coast
- Judicial district: Torrelavega
- Capital: Santillana del Mar

Government
  - Alcalde: Isidro Rábago León (2007) (PSC-PSOE)

Area
  - Total: 28.46 km^{2} (10.99 sq mi)
- Elevation: 82 m (269 ft)
- Highest elevation: 275 m (902 ft)
- Lowest elevation: 0 m (0 ft)

Population (2025-01-01)
  - Total: 4,189
  - Density: 147.2/km^{2} (381.2/sq mi)
- Time zone: UTC+1 (CET)
  - Summer (DST): UTC+2 (CEST)
- Postal code: 39330
- Official language(s): Spanish

Spanish Cultural Heritage
- Type: Non-movable
- Criteria: Historic ensemble
- Designated: 27 July 1943
- Reference no.: RI-53-0000008

Santillana del Mar (Spanish pronunciation: [santiˈʎana ðel maɾ]) is a historic town situated in Cantabria, Spain. Its many historic buildings attract thousands of visitors every year.

There is an old saying that Santillana del Mar is The Town of Three Lies, since it is neither a Saint (Santa), nor flat (llana), nor is it by the sea (Mar) as implied by its name. However, the name actually derives from Santa Juliana (or Santa Illana) whose remains are kept in the Colegiata, a Romanesque church and former Benedictine monastery. The UNESCO World Heritage Site Cave of Altamira is nearby.

== Localities ==
The 3,983 inhabitants (INE, 2006) are distributed as follows:

- Arroyo, 43 pop.
- Camplengo, 201 pop.
- Herrán, 204 pop.
- Mijares, 124 pop.
- Queveda, 586 pop.
- Santillana del Mar (capital), 1.108 pop.
- Ubiarco, 246 pop.
- Vispieres, 337 hab.
- Viveda, 1.069 pop.
- Yuso, 65 pop.

== Utilities ==
=== Wi-Fi hotspot ===
The municipality of Santillana del Mar has launched the creation of free internet access in the village for both residents and tourists, and has promised broadband connection for the entire municipality.

== Notable people ==
Santillana (born 1952), footballer

== Gallery ==
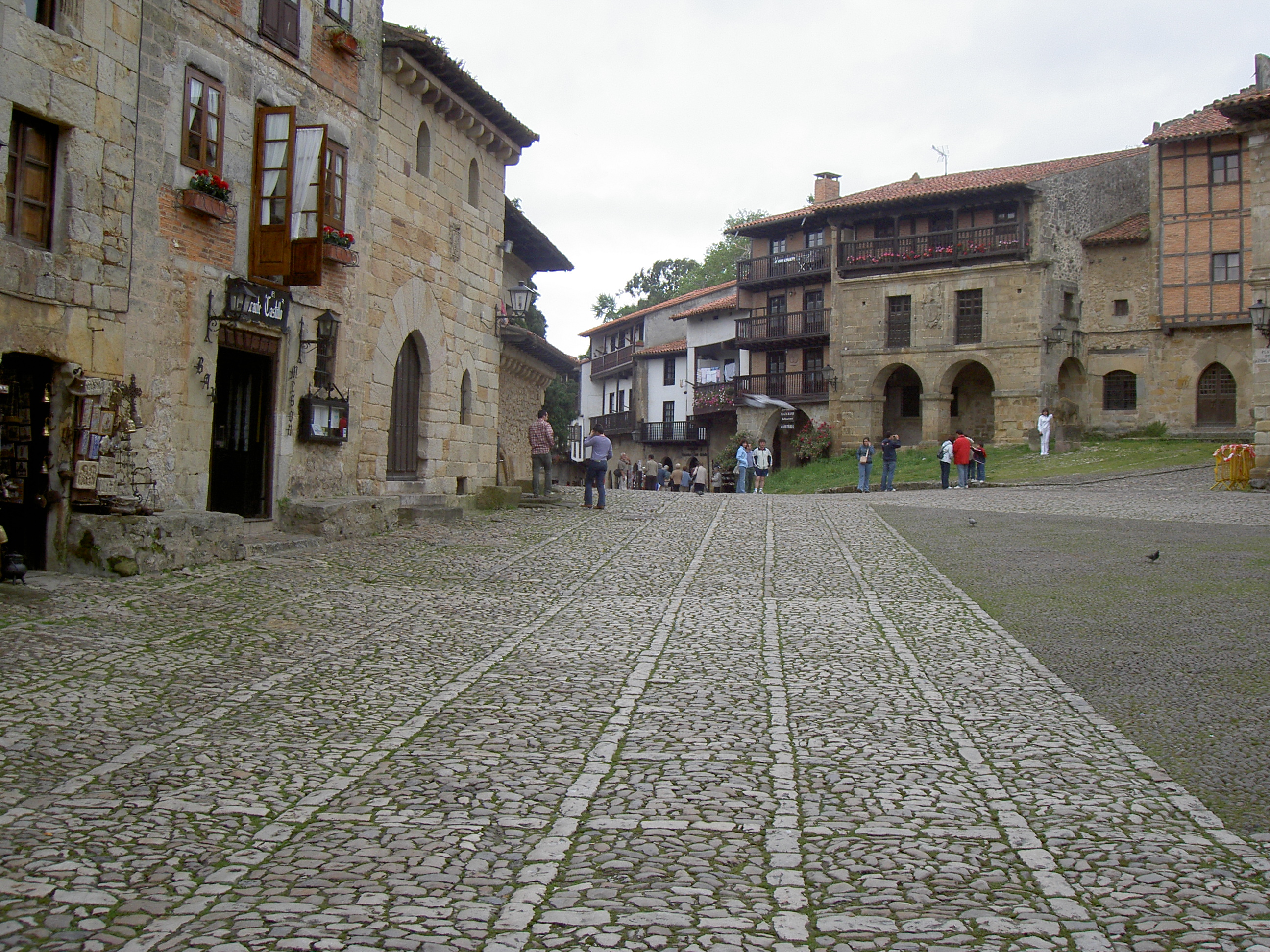

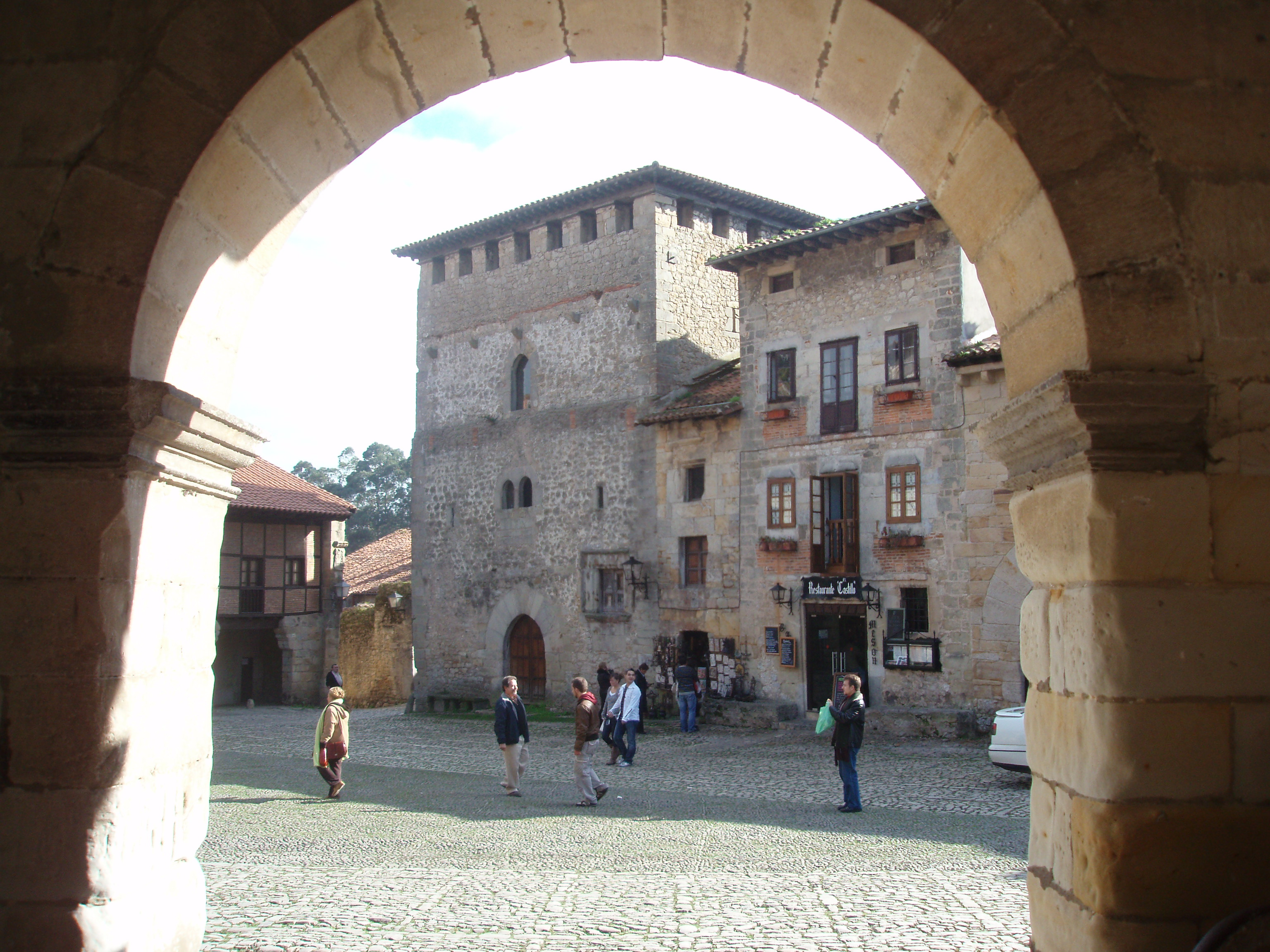

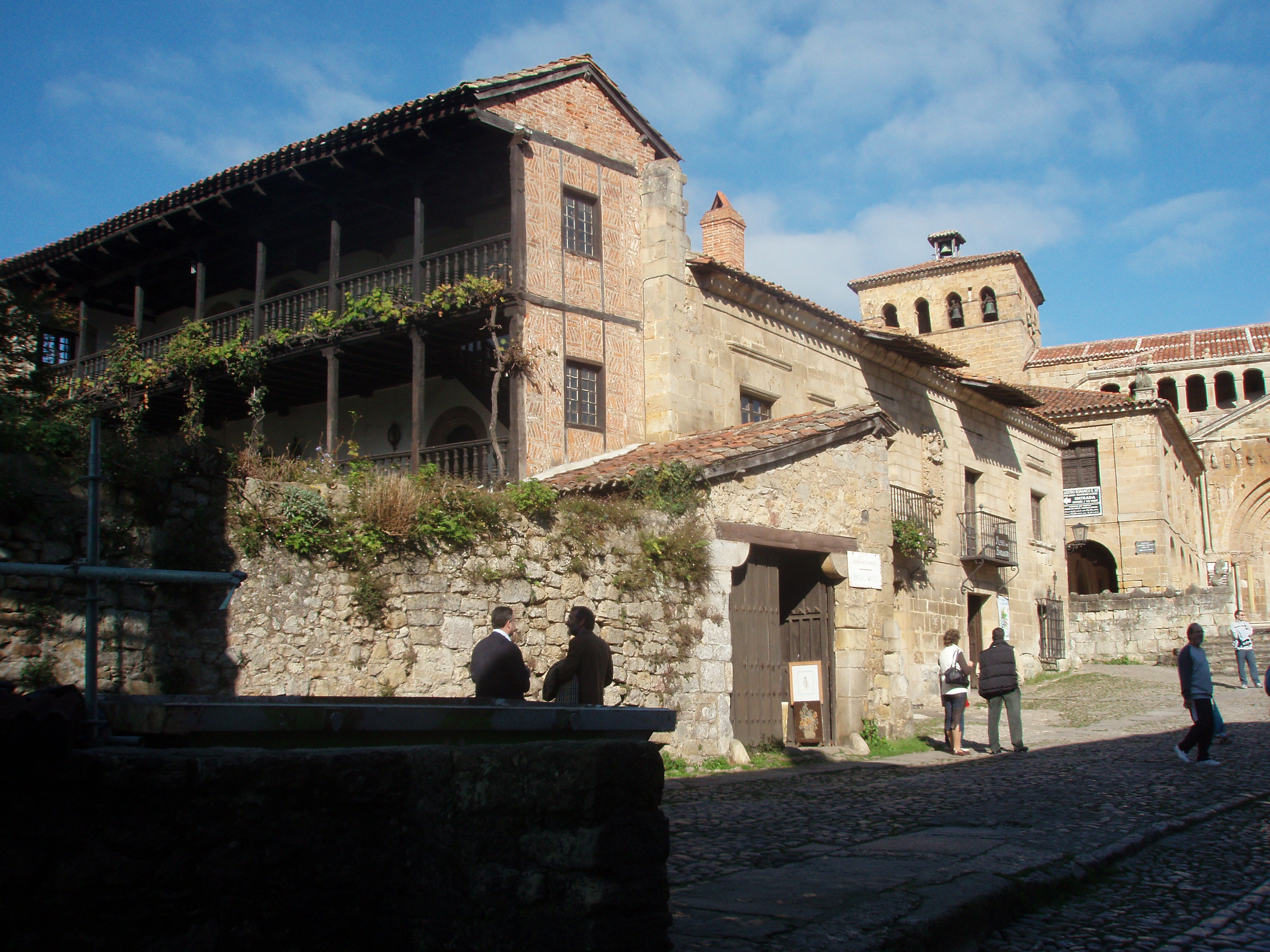
View of the typical architecture of this town.

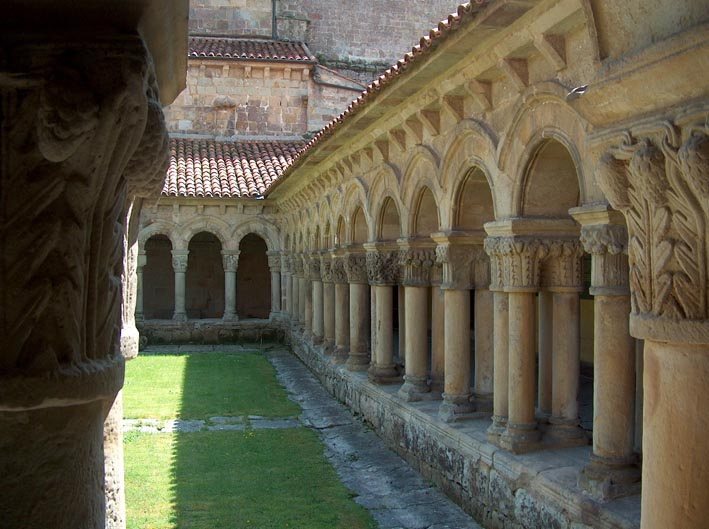
Colegiata de Santillana del Mar.

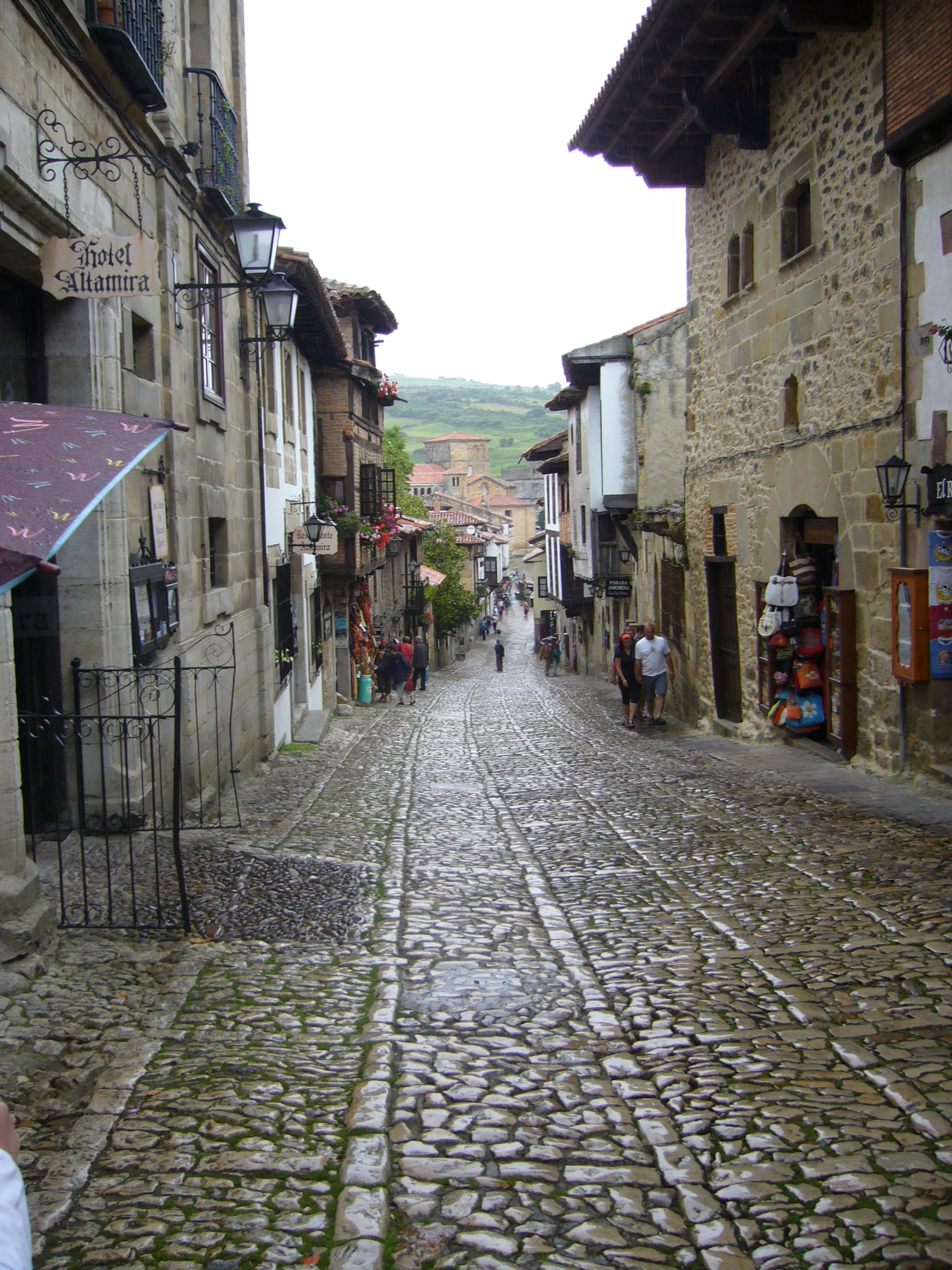
One of the streets in Santillana del Mar.

== In literature ==
The protagonist of the novel Gil Blas was born in Santillana.

In his philosophical novel La Nausée, Jean-Paul Sartre described Santillana as the prettiest village in Spain ("le plus joli village d'Espagne").
