= Cohiño =

Town in Cantabria, Spain

Coordinates: 43°11′29″N 4°04′33″W

Cohiño is a town in the Arenas de Iguña municipality of the Spanish region of Cantabria. Locally the town is also known as Palazuelos. In the year 2004 the population of Cohiño was 71. The village is located 0.6 kilometers (0.37 mi) from the capital of the municipality, Arenas de Iguña, and 180 meters (591 feet) above sea level. Several historical sites can be found in Cohiño, notably the parish church of Santa Marina, built during the 15th or 16th century, and the hermitage of the Remedies.
