= Los Llares =

Town in Arenas de Iguña, Cantabria, Spain

Coordinates: 43°11′N 4°06′W

Los Llares is a town in the Arenas de Iguña municipality of the Spanish region of Cantabria. In the year 2004 the population of los Llares was 45. The town is located 5.1 kilometers (3.2 mi) from the capital of the municipality, Arenas de Iguña, and 245 meters (804 feet) above sea level. The hermitage of the Virgin of the Moral can be found where the valleys of Iguña and Cabuérniga meet in los Llares.
