= Suances =

Coordinates: 43°26′N 4°03′W

- Suances
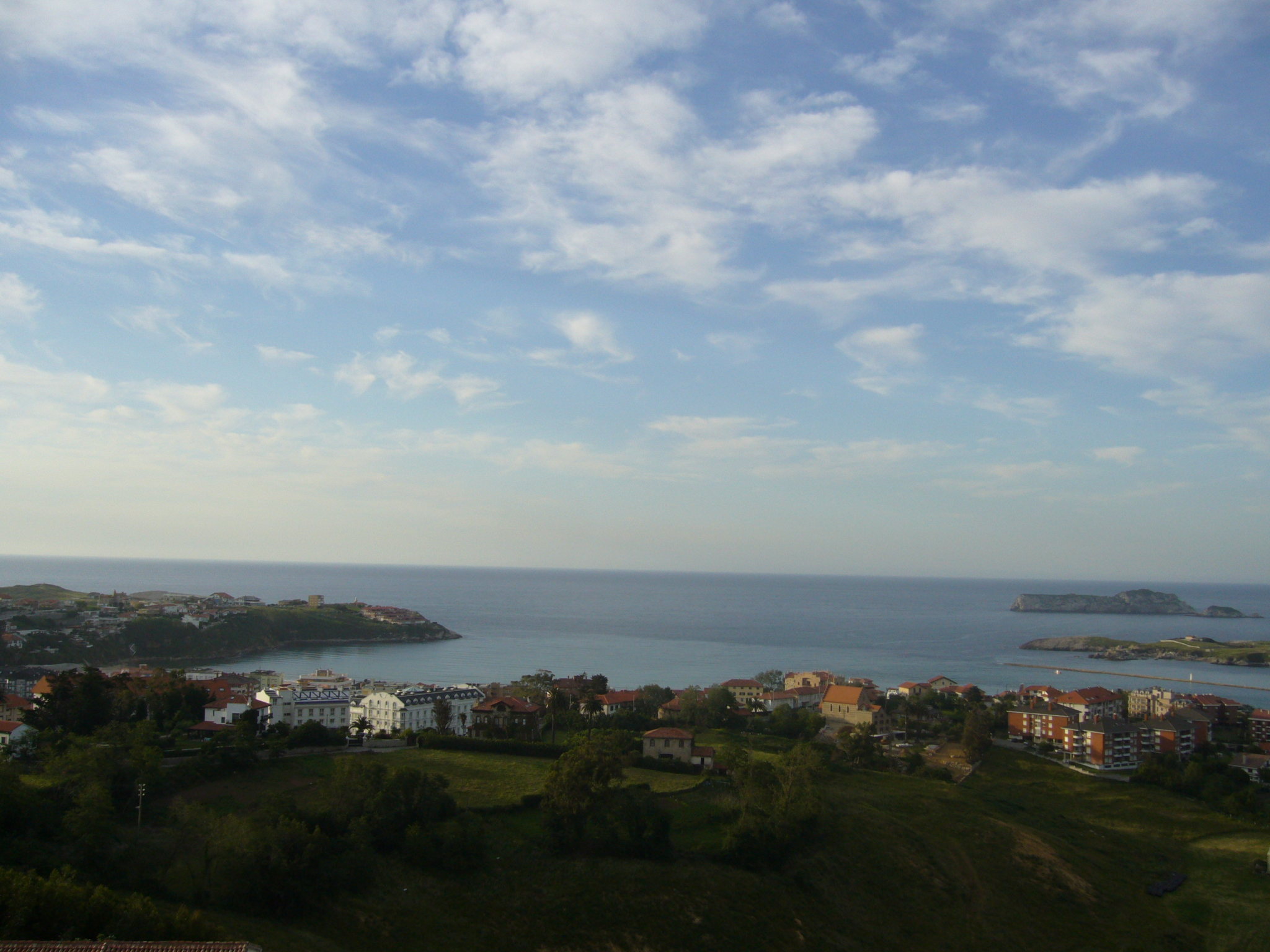
- View of the town of Suances, in Cantabria (Spain)

- Flag Coat of arms
- Interactive map of Suances
- Country: Spain

Population (2025-01-01)
  - Total: 9,034

Suances is a municipality in Cantabria Province, Spain.

== Geography ==
Suances is located in the central coast of Cantabria, in the Ría de San Martín de la Arena, where the rivers Saja and Besaya flow to the Cantabric sea. Suances has five beaches: La Tablía, Los Locos, La Concha, La Ribera and La Riberuca; and five islands (Los Conejos, La Pasiega, Casilda, Segunda and Solita), despite the location of these islands (in front of Miengo) they are part of Suances.

== Population ==
Suances has 8.552 inhabitants (INE, 2013) in six villages: Suances (5.034), Hinojedo (1.811), Cortiguera (817), Tagle (516), Ongayo (202) and Puente Avíos (172).

== Transport ==
=== Roads ===
Suances is connected to the rest of Cantabria by two main autonomical roads (CA-132 to Viveda and CA-136 to Santillana del Mar), and four minor roads: CA-340, CA-341, CA-342 and CA-351.

=== Bus ===
Suances is connected to Torrelavega by the line Ubiarco-Torrelavega of Autobuses Casanova, and to Santander by the line Ubiarco-Santander of Autobuses La Cantábrica.

== Administration ==
Andrés Ruiz Moya (PSOE) has been the mayor of Suances since 2007.

== Economy ==
Due to the beaches and the hotels, Suances is the most important centre of tourism in the central coast of Cantabria. The touristic season starts in June and ends in October.

== Sports ==
Suances and specially Los Locos beach are very popular surfing destinations for both local and international surf riders.

== Monuments ==
A very important monument is the cave of "Las Brujas", an archeological site of paintings made with the hands, from the Palaeolithic era.

The municipality has two listed properties: La Mota de Tres Palacios, a medieval fortification in Hinojedo; and the wall that surrounds the former convent of Trinitarias.
