= Torrelavega =

Torrelavega Torlavega (Asturian)
- Municipality
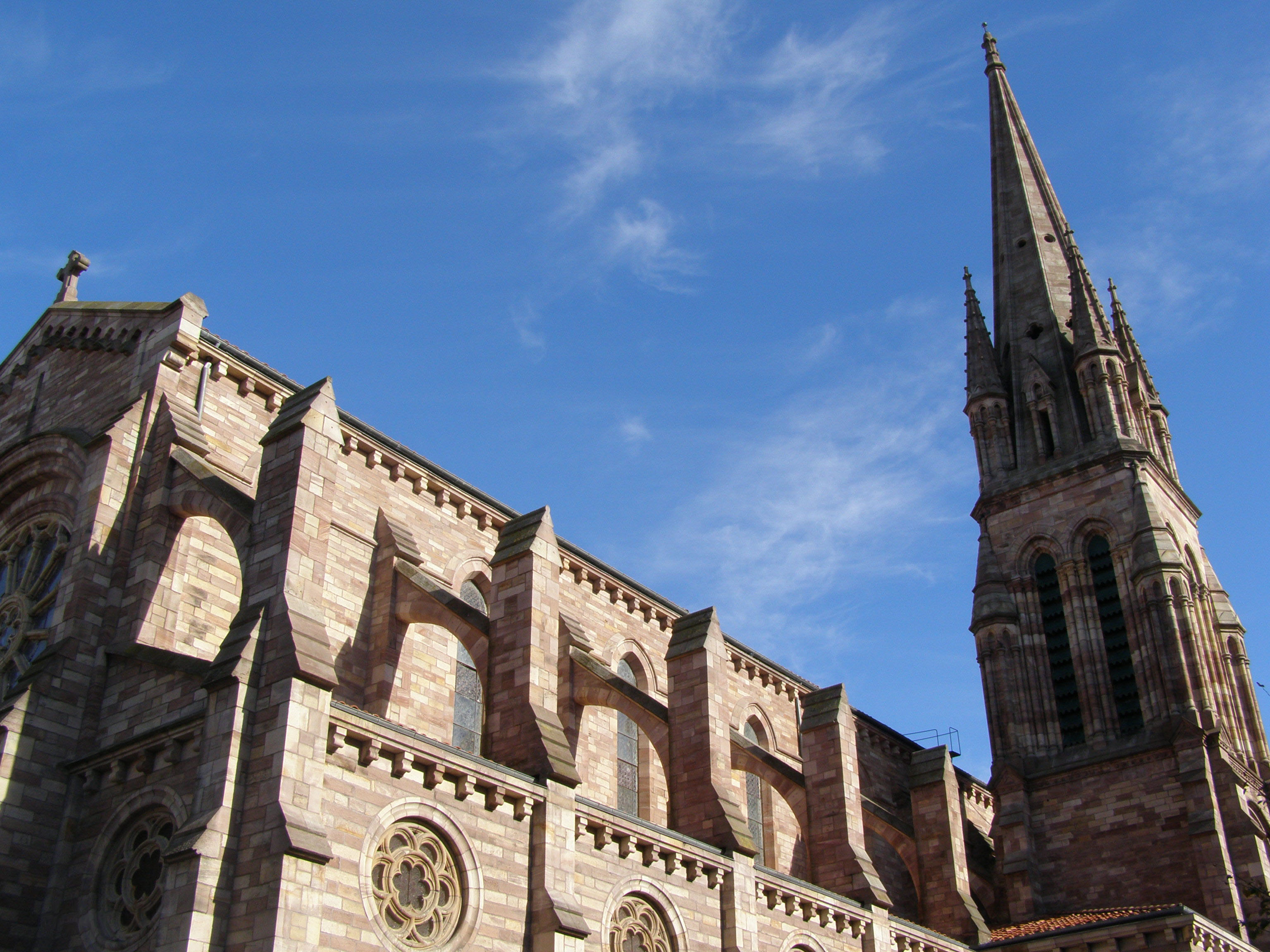
- Church of Nuestra Señora de la Asunción.

- Flag Coat of arms
- Motto: Ave Maria (Hail Mary)
- Location of the Municipality of Torrelavega in Cantabria.
- Interactive map of Torrelavega
- Location in Spain
- Coordinates: 43°21′02″N 4°02′57″W
- Country: Spain
- Autonomous community: Cantabria
- Province: Cantabria
- Comarca: Valle del Besaya
- Founded: 14th century as Torre de la Vega

Government
  - Alcalde: Javier López Estrada (2019) (PRC)

Area
  - Total: 35.54 km^{2} (13.72 sq mi)
- Elevation: 25 m (82 ft)
- Highest elevation: 606 m (1,988 ft)
- Lowest elevation: 12 m (39 ft)

Population (2025-01-01)
  - Total: 51,796
  - Density: 1,457/km^{2} (3,775/sq mi)
- Demonym: Torrelaveguenses
- Time zone: UTC+1 (CET)
  - Summer (DST): UTC+2 (CEST)
- Postal code: 39300
- Official language(s): Spanish
- Website: Official website

Torrelavega (Asturian: Torlavega) is a municipality and important industrial and commercial hub in the single province Autonomous Community of Cantabria, northern Spain.

It is situated roughly 8 kilometres from the Cantabrian Coast and 27.5 kilometres from the capital of the Autonomous Community, Santander, halfway between the Principality of Asturias and the Basque Country. The rivers Saja and Besaya flow through the city.

It is the capital of the comarca (county, but with no administrative role) of Valle del Besaya which includes also composed of the municipalities of Suances, Polanco, Cartes, Los Corrales de Buelna, Cieza, Arenas de Iguña, Bárcena de Pie de Concha, Molledo, Anievas and San Felices de Buelna.

Torrelavega is a regional centre for industry and transport, and its weekly livestock fair is famous in Spain. Its stadium is known as El Malecon. The Cave of Altamira, which contains prehistoric paintings, is about 10 kilometres northwest of the city.

== History ==
Torrelavega was founded at the end of the thirteenth century by Garci Lasso de la Vega I (the elder), Adelantado Mayor of the Kingdom of Castile in the name of King Alfonso XI of Castile.

Its current name is due to the contraction of the original eponym of "Torre de la Vega". The Castle or Tower of the Vega's was built by Leonor Lasso de la Vega, daughter of Garci Lasso de la Vega II, the younger, and mother of the Íñigo López de Mendoza, marqués de Santillana in order to administer the tax and privilege due in the family's territory.

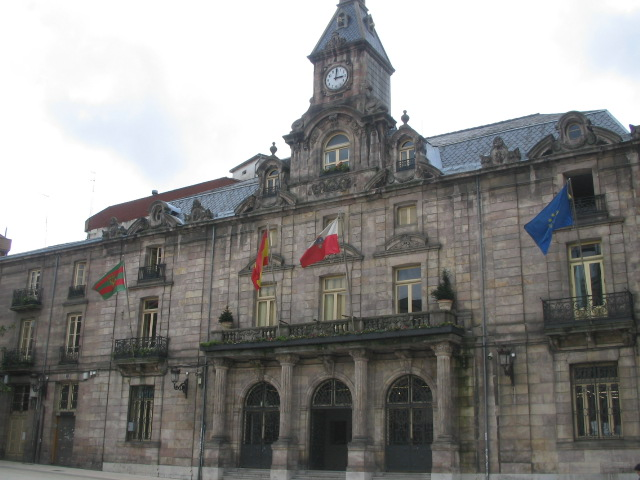
Town Hall.

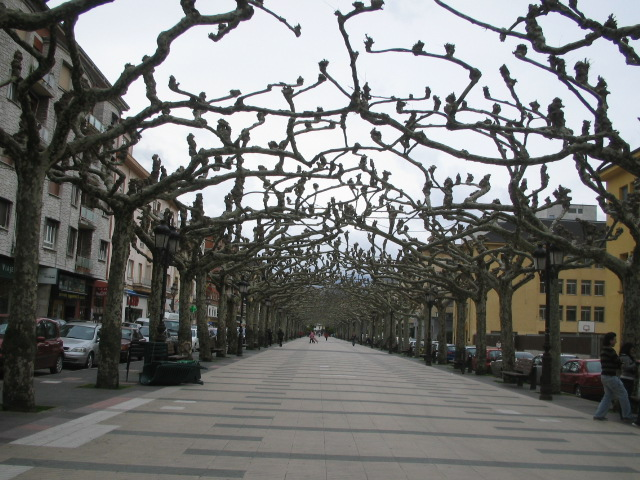
Avenida de España (Avenue of Spain).

The name of the comarca, Valle del Besaya is derived from the Astur-Leonese Bisalia, which in turn derives from the Celtic, Bis-salia (the second Salia or Saja) from the two rivers that flow through the city.

Torrelavega was an important agricultural hub in the Kingdom of Castile since medieval times. Continuous population growth and industrial development enabled Torrelavega to attain city status in 1895 from the Queen Regent Maria Christina of Bourbon, Princess of the Two Sicilies.

The city is home to the main seat of the Spanish anarcho-syndicalist labour union the Confederación Nacional del Trabajo.

== Notable people ==
- Óscar Freire, cyclist.
- Juanjo Cobo, cyclist.
- Dani Sordo, Rally Driver.
- Antonio Resines, Actor.
- Cristina Bucsa, tennis player.
- Alfonso de Galarreta, FSSPX bishop.

== Twin towns – sister cities ==
Torrelavega is twinned with:

- Louga, Senegal
- Old Havana, Cuba
- Rochefort, France
- Zug, Western Sahara
