= Saja (river) =

River in Spain

Coordinates: 43.435°N 4.035°W

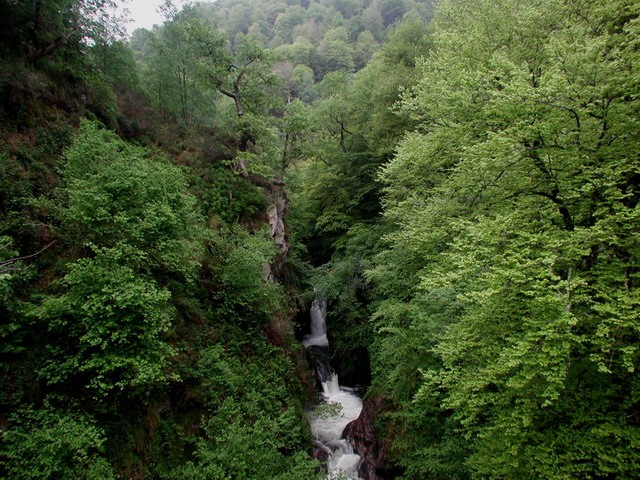
- Pozo del Amo reserve

Location
- Country: Spain
- State: Cantabria
- Region: Saja-Nansa
- City: Torrelavega

Physical characteristics
- Source: Northern Sierra del Cordel
  - location: Mancomunidad Campoo-Cabuérniga, Cantabria, Spain
  - elevation: 1,700 m (5,600 ft)
- Mouth: Ría San Martín de la Arena
  - location: Suances and Miengo, Cantabria, Spain
  - elevation: 0 m (0 ft)
- Length: 67 km (42 mi)
- Basin size: 442 km^{2} (171 sq mi)
- Discharge
  - location: mouth
  - average: 12.1 m^{3}/s (430 cu ft/s)

Basin features
- Tributaries
  - left: Diablo (river), Navas del Rey
  - right: Argoza, Bayones, Besaya

The Saja is a river in the autonomous community of Cantabria, northern Spain. It flows into the Cantabric sea. Part of its course is inside the Saja-Besaya Natural Park

The Saja's source is at 1,700 meters above sea level and it flows rapidly through a steep V-shaped basin during the first kilometers. Past the village of Fresneda the valley starts to open up and it develops a wide alluvial plain in the Cabuerniga valley.

Regarding the ecologic conservation of the river, it is good from the source to the Santa Lucía bridge, from when it begins to show important alterations, and being catalogued as moderately conserved. Down the confluence with the Besaya the alterations are already serious or very serious, being catalogued as badly conserved.

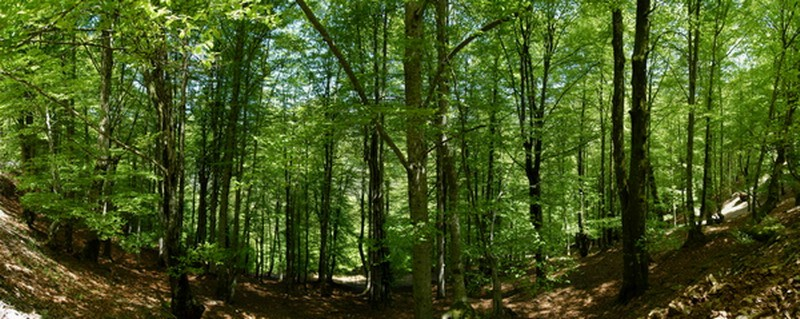
The Saja-Besaya Natural Park, abundant in beech trees

== See also ==
- List of rivers of Spain
