= Lorenzo Buelna =

Mexican baseball player (born 1980)

- Outfielder / Coach
- Born: January 24, 1980 (age 46); Ciudad Obregón, Sonora, Mexico
- Bats: Right Throws: Right

Career statistics
- Batting average: .300
- Home runs: 53
- Runs batted in: 500

Teams
- DSL Angels (1999); Butte Copper Kings (2000); Puebla Pericos (2001–2004); Pericos de Puebla (2005–2008); Rojos del Águila de Veracruz (2008); Pericos de Puebla (2009); Sultanes de Monterrey (2009–2011); Olmecas de Tabasco (2010); Leones de Yucatán (2011); Olmecas de Tabasco (2013)

Medal record

Men's baseball

Representing Mexico

Pan American Games
| Bronze medal – third place | 2003 Santo Domingo | Team competition |

Central American and Caribbean Games
| Silver medal – second place | 2010 Mayagüez | Team |

Lorenzo Guillermo Buelna Lara (born January 24, 1980) is a Mexican former professional baseball outfielder who most recently served as a coach for El Águila de Veracruz of the Mexican League.

== Early life ==
Buelna Lara was born in Ciudad Obregón, Mexico.

== Playing career ==
He was signed by the Anaheim Angels as an undrafted free agent on January 12, 1999, and played for the DSL Angels that year, hitting .270 with 2 HR and 36 RBI. He played for the Butte Copper Kings in 2000 and hit .262, while stealing 17 bases in 23 tries.

He has not played professional baseball in the United States since, instead playing in the Mexican League. In 2001 Buelna batted .246 with 0 HR and 21 RBI his first season with the Pericos de Puebla, with whom he would remain until 2009. In 2002, he hit .290 with 1 HR and 33 RBI. In 2003, he hit .346 and was sixth in the Mexican League in batting average. He made the league All-Star team in the outfield along with Roberto Mendez and Luis García. He hit .303 in 2004. Buelna hit .332 with a .527 slugging percentage in 2005, usually batting second or sixth in the lineup while playing left field.

In 2006, he hit .300 for Puebla then batted .278 in limited action for the Yaquis de Obregón of the Liga Mexicana del Pacífico, a winter league. Buelna batted .330 in 2007. He played for Mexico in the 2007 Baseball World Cup, hitting .229 with 10 runs in 10 games for the 7th-place team.

In 2007, he hit .330, in 2008 his mark was .280 (as he played for Puebla and the Rojos del Águila de Veracruz), in 2009 he batted .303 (for Puebla and the Sultanes de Monterrey), in 2010 his mark was .294 for Monterrey and the Olmecas de Tabasco and in 2011 it slumped to .251 as he played for Monterrey and the Leones de Yucatán. He did not play in 2012, but returned for 2013 to hit .237 in 61 games for Tabasco.

== Coaching career ==
On April 10, 2026, Buelna was hired to serve as a coach for El Águila de Veracruz of the Mexican League. On May 6, Buelna was fired by the team.
