= Cieza, Cantabria =

Cieza
- Municipality
- Flag Coat of arms

- Location of Cieza

- Location in Spain
- Coordinates: 43°13′20″N 4°5′15″W
- Country: Spain
- Autonomous community: Cantabria
- Province: Cantabria
- Comarca: Besaya valley
- Judicial district: Torrelavega
- Capital: Villayuso de Cieza

Government
  - MAyor: Agustín Sáiz Pérez (2007) (PP)

Area
  - Total: 44.07 km^{2} (17.02 sq mi)
- Elevation: 166 m (545 ft)

Population (2025-01-01)
  - Total: 528
  - Density: 12.0/km^{2} (31.0/sq mi)
- Time zone: UTC+1 (CET)
  - Summer (DST): UTC+2 (CEST)
- Postal code: 39407

Cieza is a municipality located in the autonomous community of Cantabria, Spain. According to the 2007 census, the city has a population of 664 inhabitants. Its capital is Villayuso de Cieza.

== Twin towns ==
- Cieza, Spain
