= Lugar (country subdivision) =

Lugar is a name for a type of country subdivision in Portugal and Spain.

== Spain ==
In Spain, the Lugar is one of the categories in the official gazetteer of population entities. In the Royal Order and Instruction of the 8 of March 1930, issued for the elaboration of the Annual gazetteer, the Lugar is defined as the population entity designated with that title, and also having their dwellings distributed in streets and plazas. As a general rule, the term Lugar indicates the related population entity that has or has had a jurisdictional term.
