= San Felices de Buelna =

San Falices de Buelna
- Municipality
- Coat of arms

- Location in Spain
- Coordinates: 43°16′31″N 4°2′55″W
- Country: Spain
- Autonomous community: Cantabria
- Province: Cantabria
- Comarca: Besaya

Government
  - Mayor: José González-Linares Gutiérrez

Area
  - Total: 36.24 km^{2} (13.99 sq mi)
- Elevation: 78 m (256 ft)

Population (2025-01-01)
  - Total: 2,379
  - Density: 65.65/km^{2} (170.0/sq mi)
- Time zone: UTC+1 (CET)
  - Summer (DST): UTC+2 (CEST)

San Felices de Buelna is a municipality located in the autonomous community of Cantabria, Spain.
