= Los Corrales de Buelna =

- Municipality
- Flag Coat of arms

- Location of Los Corrales de Buelna

- Location in Spain
- Coordinates: 43°15′42″N 4°3′55″W
- Country: Spain
- Autonomous community: Cantabria
- Province: Cantabria
- Comarca: Besaya valley
- Judicial district: Torrelavega
- Capital: Los Corrales de Buelna

Government
  - Alcaldesa: Josefina González (2007) (PSOE)

Area
  - Total: 45.38 km^{2} (17.52 sq mi)
- Elevation: 98 m (322 ft)

Population (2025-01-01)
  - Total: 10,958
  - Density: 241.5/km^{2} (625.4/sq mi)
- Demonym: corraliego/a
- Time zone: UTC+1 (CET)
  - Summer (DST): UTC+2 (CEST)
- Website: Official website

Los Corales de Buelna is a municipality in Cantabria, Spain.

== Politics ==
The current mayor of the municipality is Ignacio Argumosa, from [PRC].

== Demographic development ==
1900	1910	1920	1930	1940	1950	1960	1970	1981	1991	2005
2.752	2.926	3.501	4.871	5.292	6.185	8.111	9.307	10.045	9.820	10.958

Source: INE
