= Yeísmo =

Delateralization feature of Spanish dialects

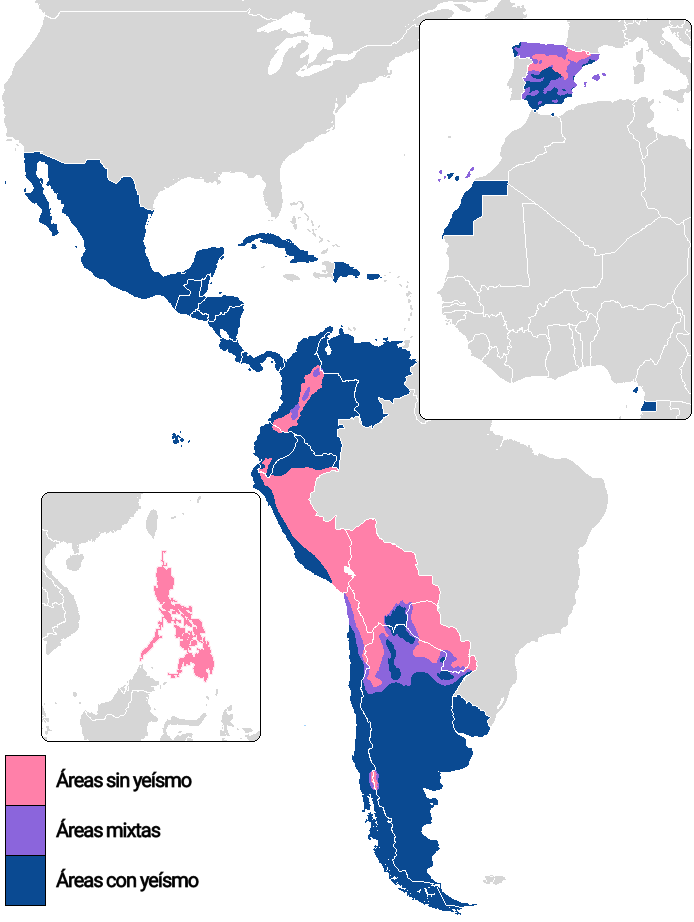
Regions with the merger (yeísmo) in blue, regions with distinction in pink, mixed regions in purple

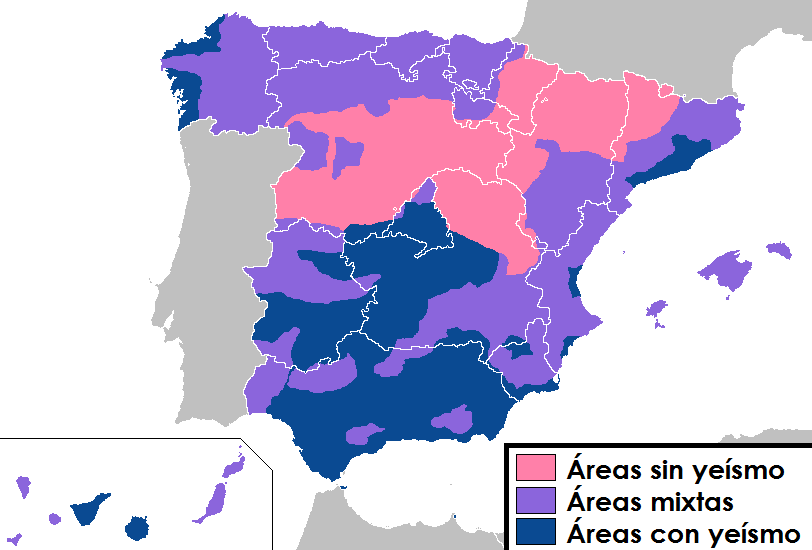
Regions with the merger (yeísmo) in blue, regions with distinction in pink, mixed regions in purple

Yeísmo (Spanish pronunciation: [ɟʝeˈismo]; literally "Y-ism") is a distinctive feature of many dialects of the Spanish language, characterized by the loss of the traditional palatal lateral approximant phoneme /ʎ/ (written ⟨ll⟩) and its merger into the voiced palatal fricative phoneme /ʝ/ (written ⟨y⟩). It is an example of delateralization.

In other words, ⟨ll⟩ and ⟨y⟩ represent the same sound, [ʝ], when yeísmo is present. The term yeísmo comes from one of the Spanish names for the letter ⟨y⟩ (ye). Over 90% of Spanish speakers exhibit this phonemic merger. Similar mergers exist in other languages, such as French, Italian, Hungarian, Catalan, Basque, Portuguese or Galician, with different social considerations.

Occasionally, the term lleísmo (pronounced [ʎeˈismo]) has been used to refer to the maintenance of the phonemic distinction (lack of a merger) between /ʝ/ and /ʎ/. In some varieties of Murcian Spanish, where the sounds merge to [ʎ] rather than typical [ʝ], this feature has been called ultralleísmo.

== Overview of types ==
The following mergers or distinctions are discussed in this article:

Term	Merger of /ʎ/ and /ʝ/ to...
yeísmo	vcd. palatal fricative [ʝ] or affricate [ɟʝ]
lleísmo	none; distinction maintained
ultralleísmo	vcd. palatal lateral approximant [ʎ]
zheísmo	vcd. palato-alveolar fricative [ʒ]
sheísmo	vls. palato-alveolar fricative [ʃ]

== Pronunciation ==
Most dialects that merge the two sounds represented by ⟨ll⟩ and ⟨y⟩ realize the remaining sound as a voiced palatal fricative [ʝ], which is much like ⟨y⟩ in English your. However, ⟨ll⟩ sometimes becomes a voiced palatal affricate [ɟʝ], sounding somewhat like ⟨j⟩ in English jar (a voiced palato-alveolar affricate [dʒ]), especially when appearing after /n/ or /l/ or at the beginning of an utterance. For example, relleno is pronounced [reˈʝeno] and conllevar is pronounced [koɲɟʝeˈβaɾ] or [kondʒeˈβaɾ].

In dialects where /ʎ/ is maintained, its pronunciation involves constriction in both the alveolar or post-alveolar area and in the palatal area. Its duration when between vowels is 20% longer than that of a simple /l/, and the formant transitions to the following vowel are nearly twice as long. Replacing /ʎ/ with /ʝ/ can thus be considered a type of lenition since it results in a lower degree of closure.

=== Zheísmo and sheísmo ===
In most of Argentina and Uruguay, the merged sound is pronounced as a voiced postalveolar fricative [ʒ]; this is referred to as zheísmo.

The [ʒ] sound itself may have originated in Argentina and Uruguay as an influence from the local Amerindian languages on the colonial Spanish spoken by the area's inhabitants of that time; the pronunciation then persisted after the mass immigration of post-colonial Italians, Germans, Spaniards and more into the region, which effectively transformed the region's demographics and affected various aspects of the Spanish language there, including (most noticeably) intonation. Prior to this post-colonial mass immigration wave, like most other South American countries, the populations of Argentina and Uruguay were similarly composed of a mestizo majority (those of mixed Spaniard and Amerindian ancestry); in Buenos Aires, the [ʒ] sound has recently been devoiced to [ʃ] (sheísmo) among younger speakers.

Both zheísmo and sheísmo are types of yeísmo, which refers only to the lack of a phonemic distinction between /ʎ/ and /ʝ/, not to any particular phonetic realization of the merged phoneme.

Comparatively, within the Ecuadorian Sierra region (spanning from the Imbabura to the Chimborazo Provinces, where the pronunciation of /ʎ/ as [ʒ] survives among the majority population of colonial-descended mestizos), the sibilant has not merged, as in Argentina and Uruguay; a distinction is also maintained, but with ⟨ll⟩ representing [ʒ], rather than the original Spanish [ʎ] sound, and ⟨y⟩ representing [ʝ]. The shift from /ʎ/ to [ʒ] in this region of Ecuador is theorized to have occurred long before the 20th century, and affected both Ecuadorian Spanish and Quechua; historically (through the early 17th century), Spanish speakers in this area had maintained distinctions between /ʒ/, /ʎ/, /ʝ/. This three-way distinction is still present in the Quechua of more southerly regions, such as the Azuay province, which uses the graphemes ⟨zh⟩, ⟨ll⟩, and ⟨y⟩ to distinguish between these phonemes. In the orthography of several Ecuadorian dialects of Quechua, under the influence of the orthography of Ecuadorian-Andean Spanish, the grapheme ⟨ll⟩ is also used to represent the [ʒ] sound.

Parts of Colombia, similarly to the Andean regions of Ecuador, maintain a distinction between ⟨ll⟩ representing [ʒ] and ⟨y⟩ representing [ʝ]. This type of distinction is found in southern Antioquia Department and the southeast end of Norte de Santander Department. A greater portion of Andean Colombia maintains the distinction between [ʎ] and [ʝ]. Overall, Colombia presents great variety with regards to yeísmo.

The same shift from [ʎ] to [ʒ] to [ʃ] (to modern [x]) historically occurred in the development of Old Spanish; this accounts for such pairings as Spanish mujer vs Portuguese mulher, ojo vs olho, hija vs filha and so on.

== Geographic extent ==
The distinction between /ʝ/ and /ʎ/ remains in the Philippines, Andean Ecuador and Peru, Paraguay, both highland and lowland Bolivia, and the northeastern portions of Argentina that border Paraguay. Parts of Chile that neighbour Bolivia are traditionally non-yeísta.

The retention of a distinction between /ʎ/ and /ʝ/ is more common in areas where Spanish coexists with other languages, either with Amerindian languages, such as Aymara, Quechua, and Guaraní, which, except for Guaraní, themselves possess the phoneme /ʎ/, or in Spain itself in areas with linguistic contact with Catalan and Basque. The presence of non-yeísta areas in parts of south-central Chile may likewise be associated with the geographical overlap of the Mapuche.

By 1989, several traditionally non-yeísta areas, such as Bogotá and much of Spain and the Canaries, had begun rapidly adopting yeísmo, in the span of little more than a single generation. In areas where yeísmo is variable, [ʎ] is lost more often in rapid and casual speech. There is also an idiolectal correlation between yeísmo and speech rate, with fast-speaking individuals being more likely to be yeísta.

By 2009 there was evidence that yeísmo had begun appearing in the speech of Ecuador's middle and upper classes. In south-central Chile yeísmo was already dominant in the first half of the 20th century but grew further at the expense of non-yeísta areas over the course of the century.

In Spain, most of the northern half of the country and several areas in the south, particularly in rural Huelva, Seville, Cádiz, and part of the Canaries used to retain the distinction, but yeísmo has spread throughout the country, and the distinction is now lost in most of Spain, particularly outside areas in linguistic contact with Catalan and Basque. In monolingual, urban northern Spain, a distinction between /ʝ/ and /ʎ/ only exists among the oldest age groups in the upper classes.

Although northern, rural areas of Spain are typically associated with lack of yeísmo, and yeísmo is typically thought of as a southern phenomenon, there are several isolated, rural, Asturleonese-speaking areas where yeísmo is found even among elderly speakers. These include the valley of Nansa, Tudanca, and Cabuérniga, all in Cantabria. This is evidence that the existence of yeísmo in the southern half of the Peninsula and beyond may be due to the arrival of Asturleonese settlers, who already had yeísmo, and subsequent dialect levelling in newly reconquered southern communities.

== Minimal pairs ==
Yeísmo produces homophony in a number of cases. For example, the following word pairs sound the same when pronounced by speakers of dialects with yeísmo, but they are minimal pairs in regions with the distinction:

- aya 'governess' and haya 'beech tree' or 'that there be' ~ halla 'he/she/it finds'
- cayó 'he/she/it fell' ~ calló 'he/she/it became silent'
- hoya 'pit, hole' ~ olla 'pot'
- baya 'berry' and vaya 'that he/she/it go' ~ valla 'fence'

The relatively low frequency of both /ʝ/ and /ʎ/ makes confusion unlikely. However, orthographic mistakes are common (for example, writing *llendo instead of yendo). A notable case is the name of the island of Mallorca: since Mallorcans tend to pronounce intervocalic /ʎ/ as /ʝ/, central Catalan scribes assumed the authentic (and correct) name Maiorca was another case of this and hypercorrected it to Mallorca. This new form ended up becoming the usual pronunciation, even for native Mallorcans.

== Similar phenomena in other languages ==
=== Romance languages ===
- Standard Portuguese distinguishes /ʎ/, /j/ and /lj/. Many Brazilian Portuguese speakers merge /ʎ/ and /lj/, making olho (verb) and óleo both /ˈɔʎu/. Some speakers, mainly of the Caipira dialect of Brazil, merge /ʎ/ and /j/, making telha and teia both /ˈtejɐ/. Some Caipira speakers distinguish etymological /ʎ/ and /lj/, pronouncing olho /ˈɔju/ and óleo /ˈɔʎu/.
- In standard French, historical /ʎ/ turned into /j/, but the spelling ⟨ill⟩ was preserved, hence briller (bʁije/, originally /briʎe/), Versailles (/vɛʁsɑj/, originally /vɛrsɑʎə/).
- Romanesco and a number of Southern and Central dialects of Italian have /j/ or /jj/ corresponding to standard Italian /ʎʎ/; the merger also occurred in many Northern Italian languages, though it is uncommon in regional Italian spoken in the North of the country, where /ʎʎ/ more usually merges with the sequence /lj/.

=== Other ===
- In Hungarian, /ʎ/ in most dialects turned into /j/, but the spelling ⟨ly⟩ was preserved, hence lyuk [juk].
- In Swedish, /lj/ turned into /j/ in word-initial positions, but the spelling ⟨lj⟩ was preserved, hence ljus [ˈjʉːs].
- In Cypriot Greek, /lj/ is often pronounced as [ʝː], especially by younger speakers. In Standard Modern Greek, it always surfaces as [ʎ].

== See also ==
- History of the Spanish language
- List of phonetics topics
- Phonological history of Spanish coronal fricatives (distinción, seseo and ceceo)
- Rhoticity in English

== Bibliography ==
- Álvarez Menéndez, Alfredo I (2005), Hablar en español: la cortesía verbal, la pronunciación estándar del español, las formas de expresión oral, Universidad de Oviedo
- Coloma, German (2011), "Valoración socioeconómica de los rasgos fonéticos dialectales de la lengua española.", Lexis, 35 (1): 91–118, doi:10.18800/lexis.201101.003, S2CID 170911379
- Klee, Carol; Lynch, Andrew (2009). El español en contacto con otras lenguas. Washington, D.C.: Georgetown University Press. ISBN 9781589012653.
- Lipski, John (1994), Latin American Spanish, New York: Longman Publishing
- Martínez-Celdrán, Eugenio; Fernández-Planas, Ana Ma.; Carrera-Sabaté, Josefina (2003), "Castilian Spanish" (PDF), Journal of the International Phonetic Association, 33 (2): 255–259, doi:10.1017/S0025100303001373
- Navarro, Tomás (1964), "Nuevos datos sobre el yeísmo en España" (PDF), Thesavrvs: Boletín del Instituto Caro y Cuervo, 19 (1): 1–117
- Penny, Ralph J. (2000). Variation and change in Spanish. Cambridge: Cambridge University Press. doi:10.1017/CBO9781139164566. ISBN 0521780454.
- Pountain, Christopher J. (2012). "Spanish Among the Ibero-Romance Languages". In Hualde, José Ignacio; Olarrea, Antxon; O'Rourke, Erin (eds.). The Handbook of Hispanic Linguistics. Hoboken: Blackwell Publishing. pp. 47–64. doi:10.1002/9781118228098.ch3. ISBN 9781405198820.
- Torreblanca, Máximo (1974), "Estado actual del lleísmo y de la h aspirada en el noroeste de la provincia de Toledo", Revista de dialectología y tradiciones populares, 30 (1–2): 77–90
- Schwegler, Armin; Kempff, Juergen; Ameal-Guerra, Ana (2009), Fonética y fonología españolas, John Wiley & Sons, ISBN 978-0470421925
- Travis, Catherine E. (2009), Introducción a la lingüística hispánica, Cambridge University Press
