= San Emeterio =

San Emeterio is a surname. Notable people with the surname include:

- Borja San Emeterio (born 1997), Spanish footballer
- Fede San Emeterio (born 1997), Spanish footballer
- Fernando San Emeterio (born 1984), Spanish baskerball coach and player
- Julio San Emeterio (1930-2010), Spanish racing cyclist
