= San Sebastián de Garabandal =

Garabandal San Sebastián de Garabandal
- Village
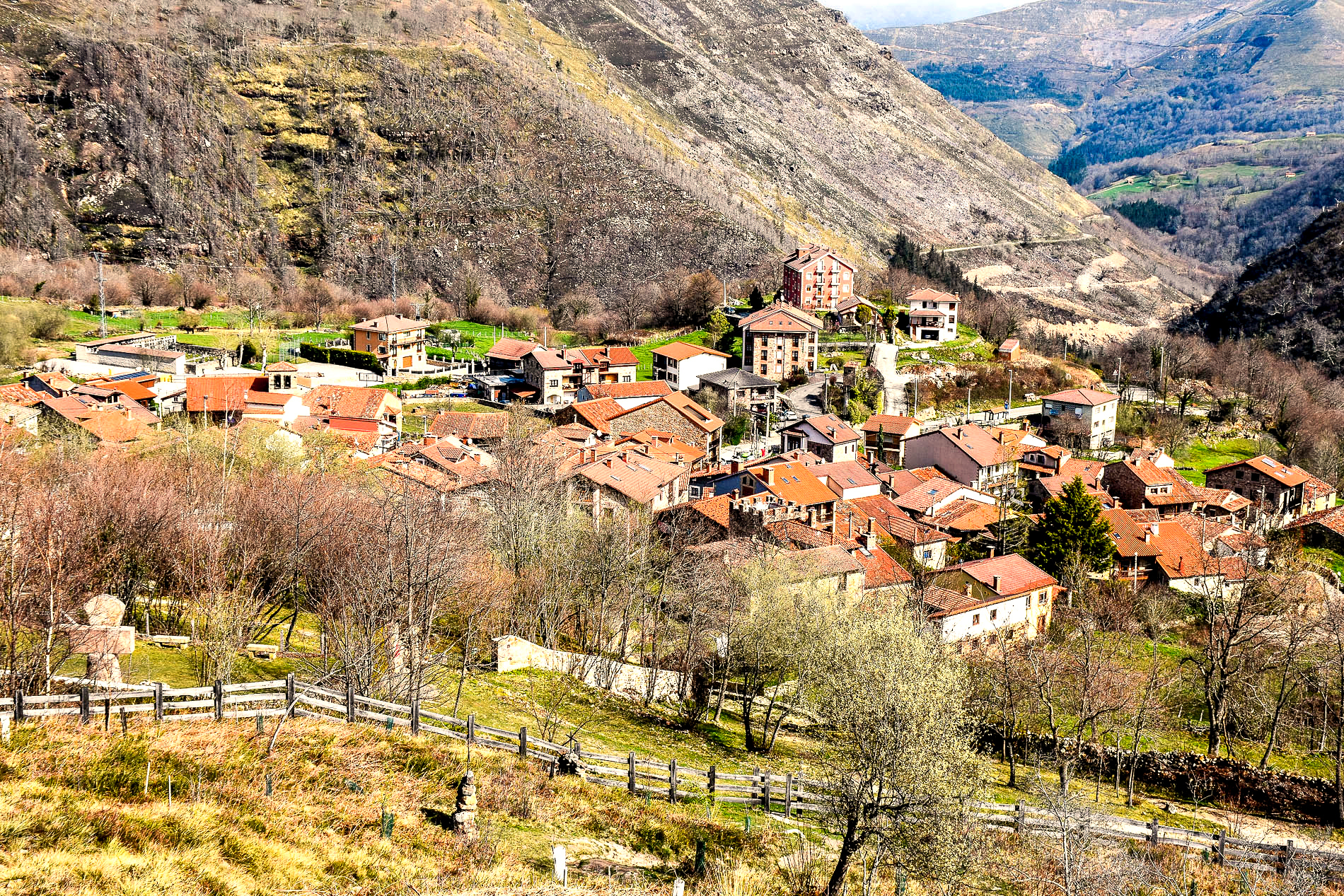
- The rural village of San Sebastián de Garabandal
- Interactive map of Garabandal
- Coordinates: 43°12′3″N 4°25′25″W
- Country: Spain
- Autonomous community: Cantabria
- County: Sanja-Nansa
- Municipality: Rionansa
- Elevation: 697 m (2,287 ft)

Population (2008)
  - Total: 107
- Postal code: 39554

San Sebastián de Garabandal, commonly called just Garabandal, is a rural village in the Peña Sagra mountain range of Northern Spain. Located in the autonomous community of Cantabria, about 600 meters above sea level, Garabandal is about 35 miles (55 km) from the Cantabrian capital, Santander, and roughly 250 miles (400 km) from the Spanish capital, Madrid. It has a population of about 300.

== Garabandal Events ==
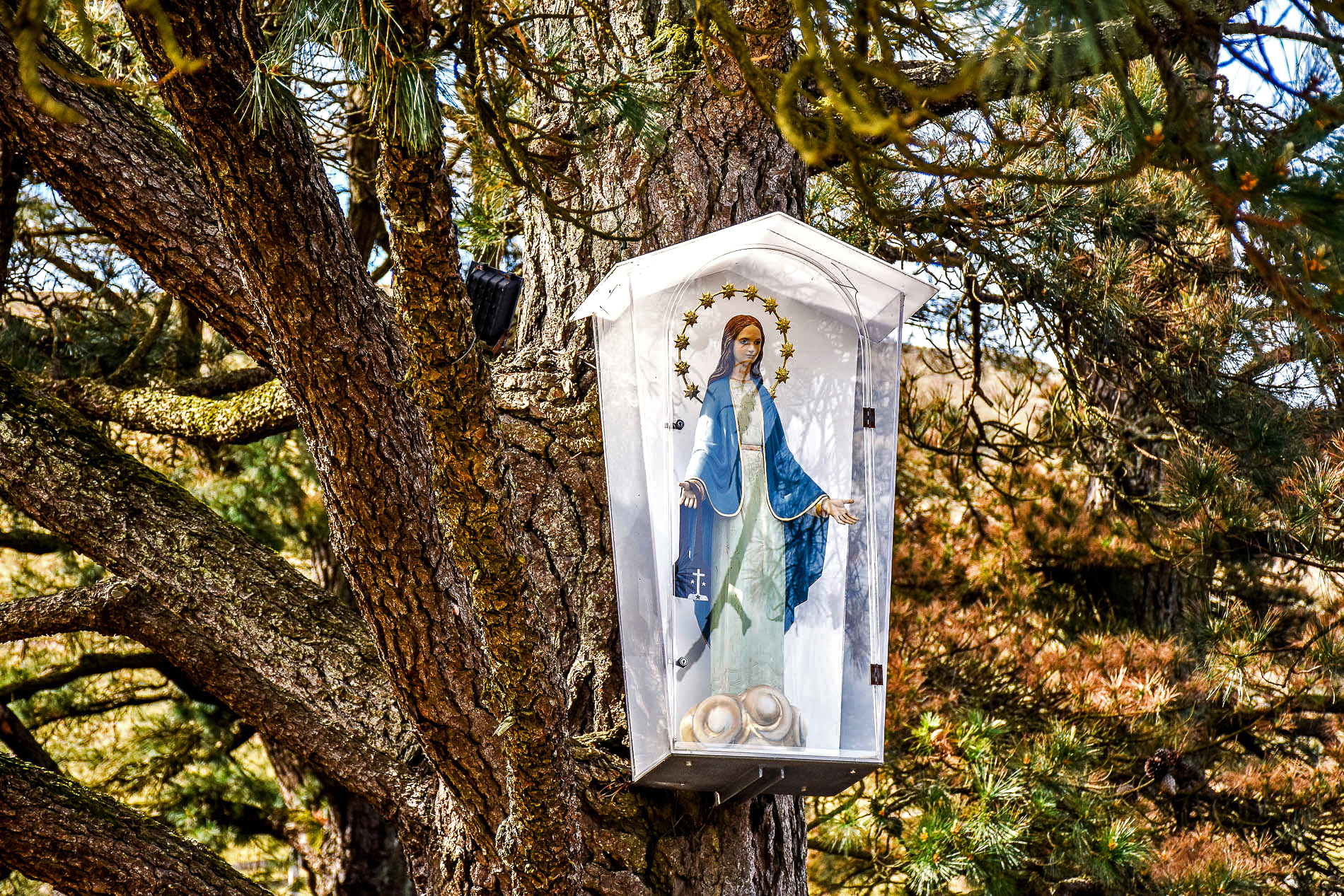
Statue of the Blessed Virgin Mary at the famous «Pines of Garabandal».

From 1961 to 1965, four young schoolgirls – Mari Loli Mazón, Jacinta González, Mari Cruz González and Conchita González – said they had received several apparitions and messages from Saint Michael the Archangel and the Blessed Virgin Mary under the title of Our Lady of Mount Carmel. The apparitions numbered in the thousands, drew huge crowds, and featured supposed paranormal phenomena, much of it filmed or photographed, with thousands of witnesses.

Today, the town is a place of pilgrimage for Roman Catholics and members of other faiths. Catholics have since been reminded by the Roman Hierarchy that the Garabandal apparitions are in no way sanctioned or approved by the Church. However, the pilgrimages are now allowed by the local bishop.

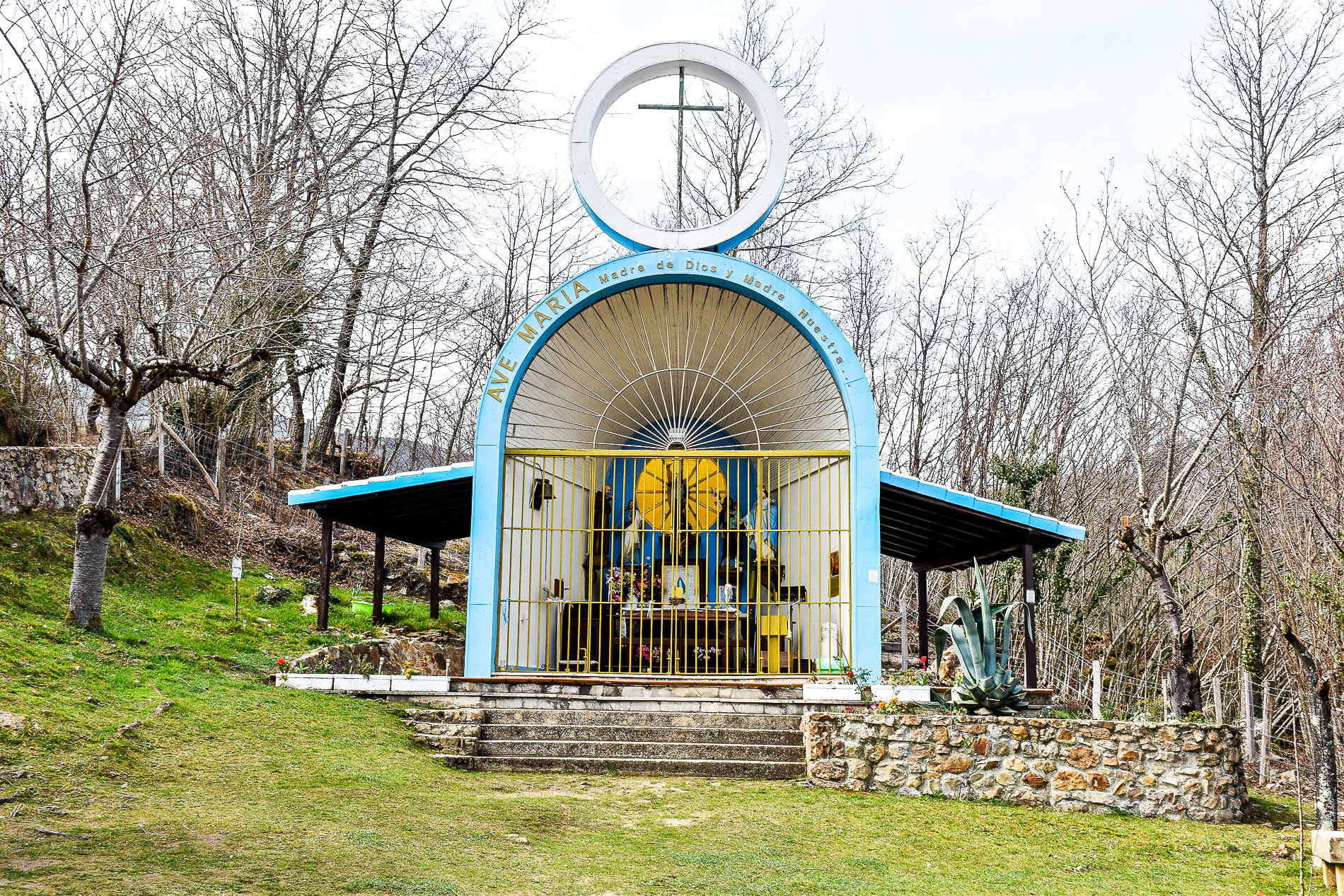
Chapel dedicated to Saint Michael the Archangel in Garabandal.

Because of the town's remote location and lack of easy accessibility, it has remained largely the same as it was in 1961.

== See also ==
- Garabandal apparitions

== Sources ==
- EWTN on Garabandal
- Workers of Our Lady of Garabandal
