= Sobrelapeña =

Village in Lamasón, Cantabria, Spain

Coordinates: 43°15′N 4°29′W

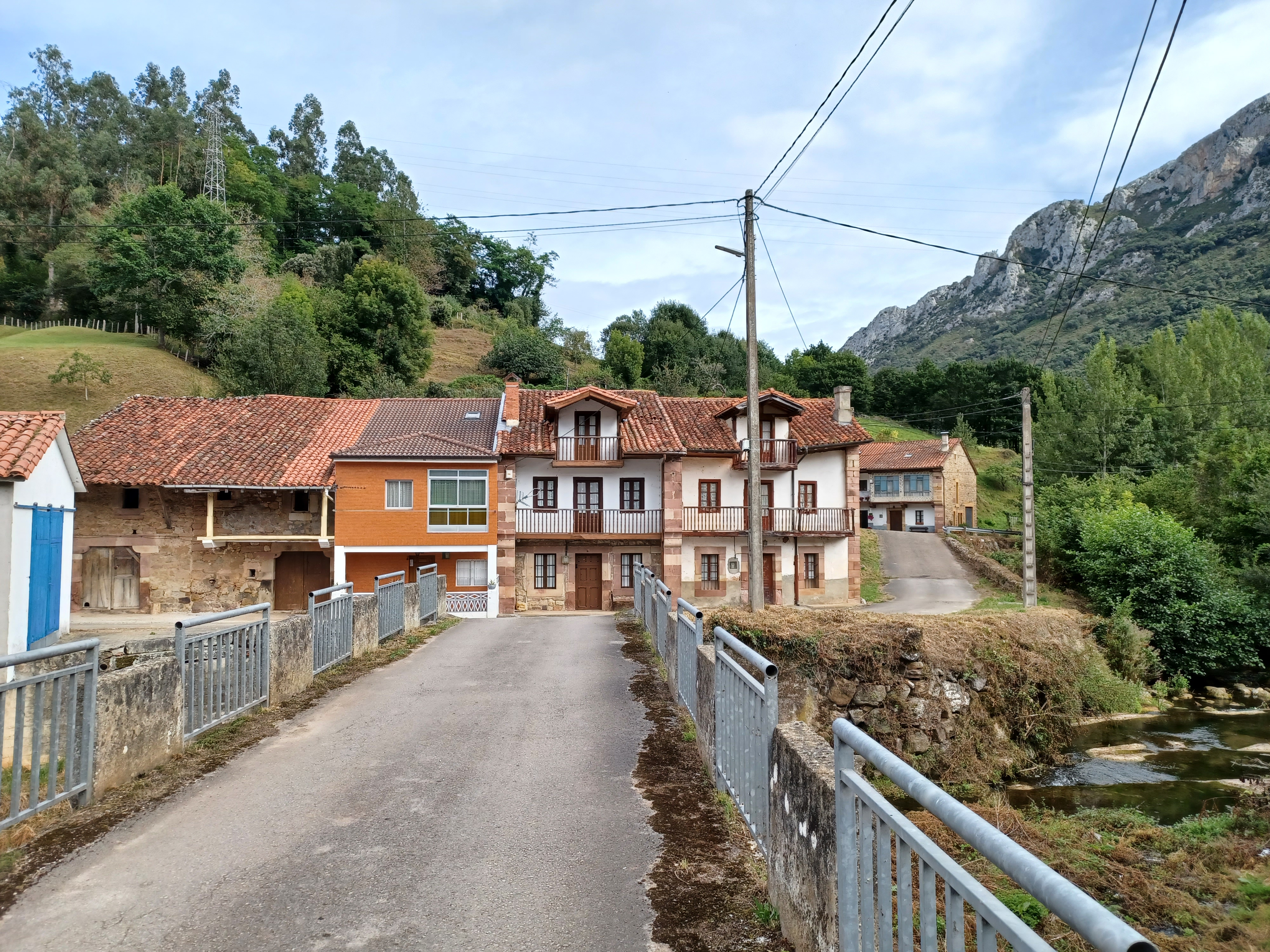
Sobrelapeña, a village on the Lebaniego Way

Sobrelapeña is a small village in the far north of Spain in the province of Cantabria. It is located in the municipality of Lamasón, and has a population of 53.
