= Borja San Emeterio =

Spanish footballer

Personal information
- Full name: Borja San Emeterio Díaz
- Date of birth: 16 March 1997 (age 29)
- Place of birth: Sierra de Ibio, Spain
- Height: 1.75 m (5 ft 9 in)
- Position: Right-back

Team information
- Current team: Intercity
- Number: 2

Youth career
- Textil Escudo
- 2007–2015: Racing Santander

Senior career*
Years	Team	Apps	(Gls)
2014–2015	Racing B	10	(1)
2014–2016	Racing Santander	32	(0)
2016–2018	Sevilla B	33	(0)
2018–2020	Lugo	1	(0)
2019	→ Cultural Leonesa (loan)	5	(0)
2019–2020	→ Atlético Baleares (loan)	21	(1)
2020–2023	Numancia	60	(0)
2023–2024	Tarazona	34	(4)
2024–	Intercity	53	(4)

International career
2015	Spain U19	8	(0)
- * Club domestic league appearances and goals as of 16 May 2026

Borja San Emeterio Díaz (born 16 March 1997) is a Spanish footballer who plays as a right-back for Intercity.

== Club career ==
=== Racing ===
Born in Sierra de Ibio, Mazcuerras, Cantabria, San Emeterio joined Racing de Santander's youth system in 2007, aged 10. He made his senior debut with the reserves in the 2014–15 season, in the Tercera División.

San Emeterio played his first match as a professional on 16 November, starting in a 0–0 Segunda División away draw against CD Lugo.

=== Sevilla ===
On 16 August 2016, San Emeterio and his brother moved to another reserve team, signing a three-year contract with Sevilla Atlético in the second division. After being rarely used in his first year he featured more regularly in the second, with the latter season ending in relegation.

=== Lugo ===
San Emeterio joined Lugo on a three-year deal on 1 August 2018. The following 23 January, he was loaned to Cultural y Deportiva Leonesa of the third tier until June.

On 12 July 2019, San Emeterio moved to CD Atlético Baleares in the same league and also in a temporary deal. Upon returning, he terminated his contract on 7 September 2020.

=== Numancia ===
On 7 September 2020, just hours after leaving Lugo, San Emeterio signed a two-year deal with recently relegated side CD Numancia. He achieved promotion to Primera Federación in 2021–22, being immediately relegated the following campaign.

== Personal life ==
San Emeterio's twin brother, Federico, is also a footballer. A midfielder, he too was developed at Racing.

== Career statistics ==
As of match played 21 March 2021

Appearances and goals by club, season and competition
Club	Season	League			National Cup		Other		Total	
Club	Season	Division	Apps	Goals	Apps	Goals	Apps	Goals	Apps	Goals
Racing Santander	2014–15	Segunda División	19	0	0	0	—		19	0
Racing Santander	2015–16	Segunda División B	13	0	1	0	4 (Note: Appearances in Segunda División B promotion playoffs)	0	18	0
Racing Santander	Total		32	0	1	0	4	0	37	0
Sevilla B	2016–17	Segunda División	10	0	—		—		10	0
Sevilla B	2017–18	Segunda División	23	0	—		—		23	0
Sevilla B	Total		33	0	0	0	0	0	33	0
Lugo	2018–19	Segunda División	1	0	1	0	—		2	0
Cultural Leonesa (loan)	2018–19	Segunda División B	5	0	0	0	—		5	0
Atlético Baleares (loan)	2019–20	Segunda División B	21	1	1	0	1	0	23	1
Numancia	2020–21	Segunda División B	15	0	0	0	—		15	0
Career total			107	1	3	0	5	0	115	1

== Honours ==
Spain U19

- UEFA European Under-19 Championship: 2015
