= Rionansa =

- Municipality
- Coat of arms

- Location of Rionansa

- Location in Spain
- Coordinates: 43°15′17″N 4°24′09″W
- Country: Spain
- Autonomous community: Cantabria
- Province: Cantabria
- Comarca: Saja-Nansa
- Judicial district: San Vicente de la Barquera
- Capital: Puentenansa

Government
  - Alcalde: José Carlos Lavín Cuesta

Area
  - Total: 118.02 km^{2} (45.57 sq mi)
- Elevation: 200 m (660 ft)

Population (2025-01-01)
  - Total: 1,022
  - Density: 8.660/km^{2} (22.43/sq mi)
- Time zone: UTC+1 (CET)
  - Summer (DST): UTC+2 (CEST)

Rionansa is a municipality located in the autonomous community of Cantabria, Spain.

== Geography ==
This municipality is located in the Nansa River Valley, from which it takes its name, in western Cantabria. The territory is close to one hundred and twenty square miles, all of them belonging to the National Game Reserve Saja.

=== Localities ===
- Arenas
- Las Bárcenas
- Cabrojo
- Celis
- Celucos
- Cosío
- La Cotera
- La Herrería
- Obeso
- Pedreo
- Los Picayos
- Puentenansa (Capital)
- Riclones
- Rioseco
- Rozadío
- San Sebastián de Garabandal
