= Garabandal apparitions =

Apparition of Christian figures in northern Spain

Our Lady of Garabandal
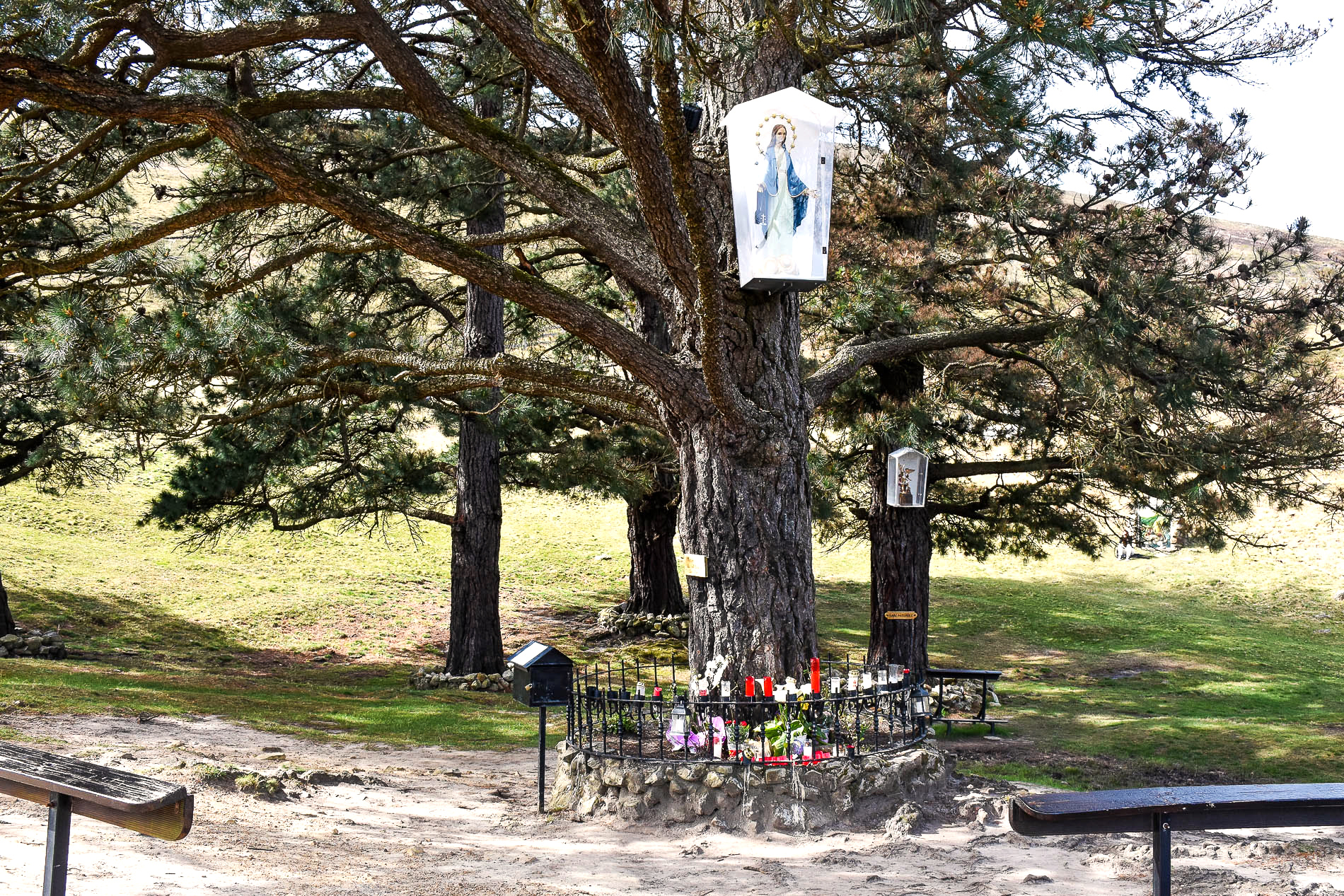
- Date: 1961-1965
- Witness: Conchita González, Mari Cruz González, Jacinta González, and Mari Loli Mazón

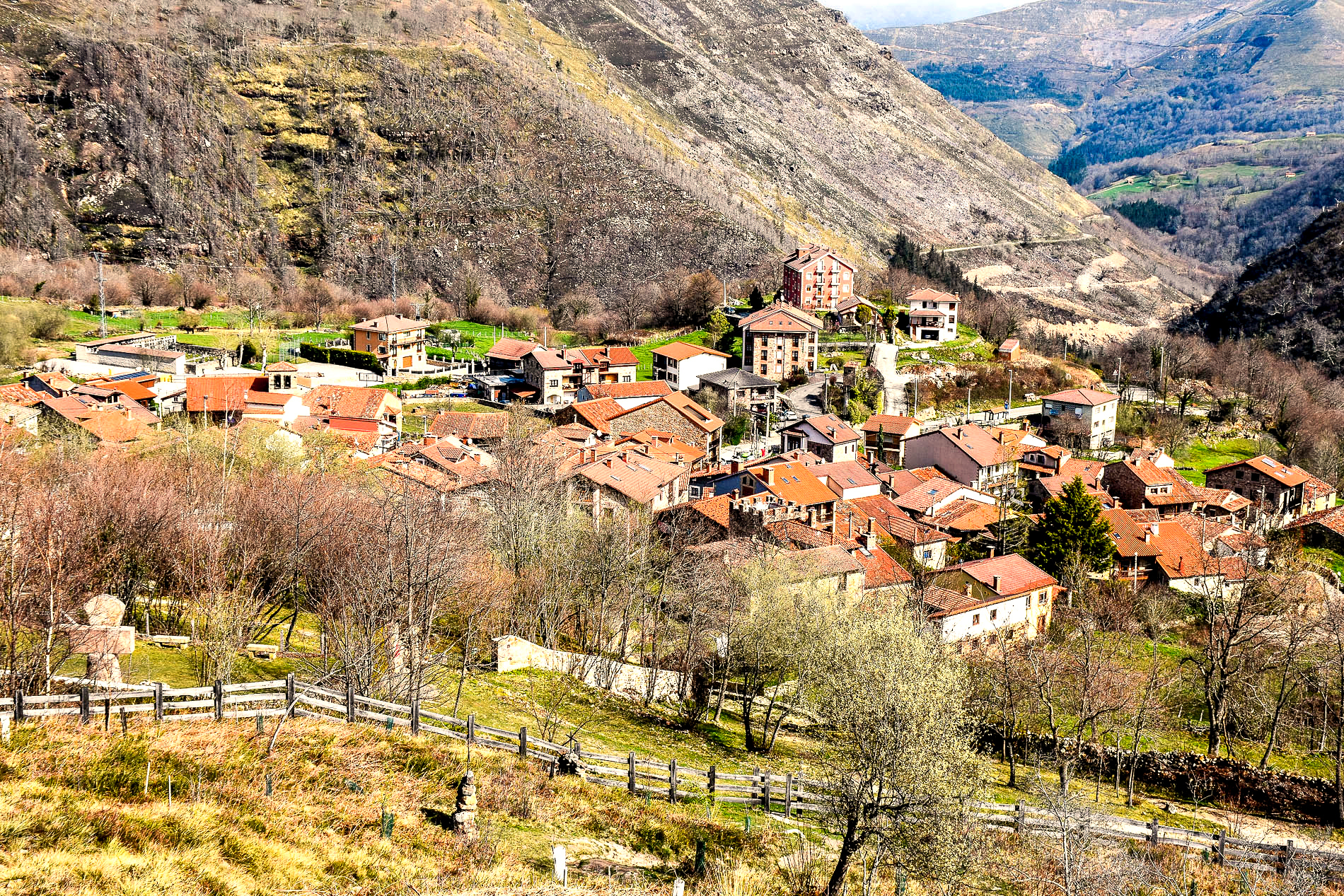
The village of Garabandal, Spain

The Garabandal apparitions, known also as Our Lady of Garabandal (Spanish: Nuestra Señora de Garabandal) are apparitions of Saint Michael the Archangel and the Blessed Virgin Mary that are reported to have occurred from 1961 to '65 to four young schoolgirls in the rural village of San Sebastián de Garabandal in the Peña Sagra mountain range in the autonomous community of Cantabria in Northern Spain.

== History ==
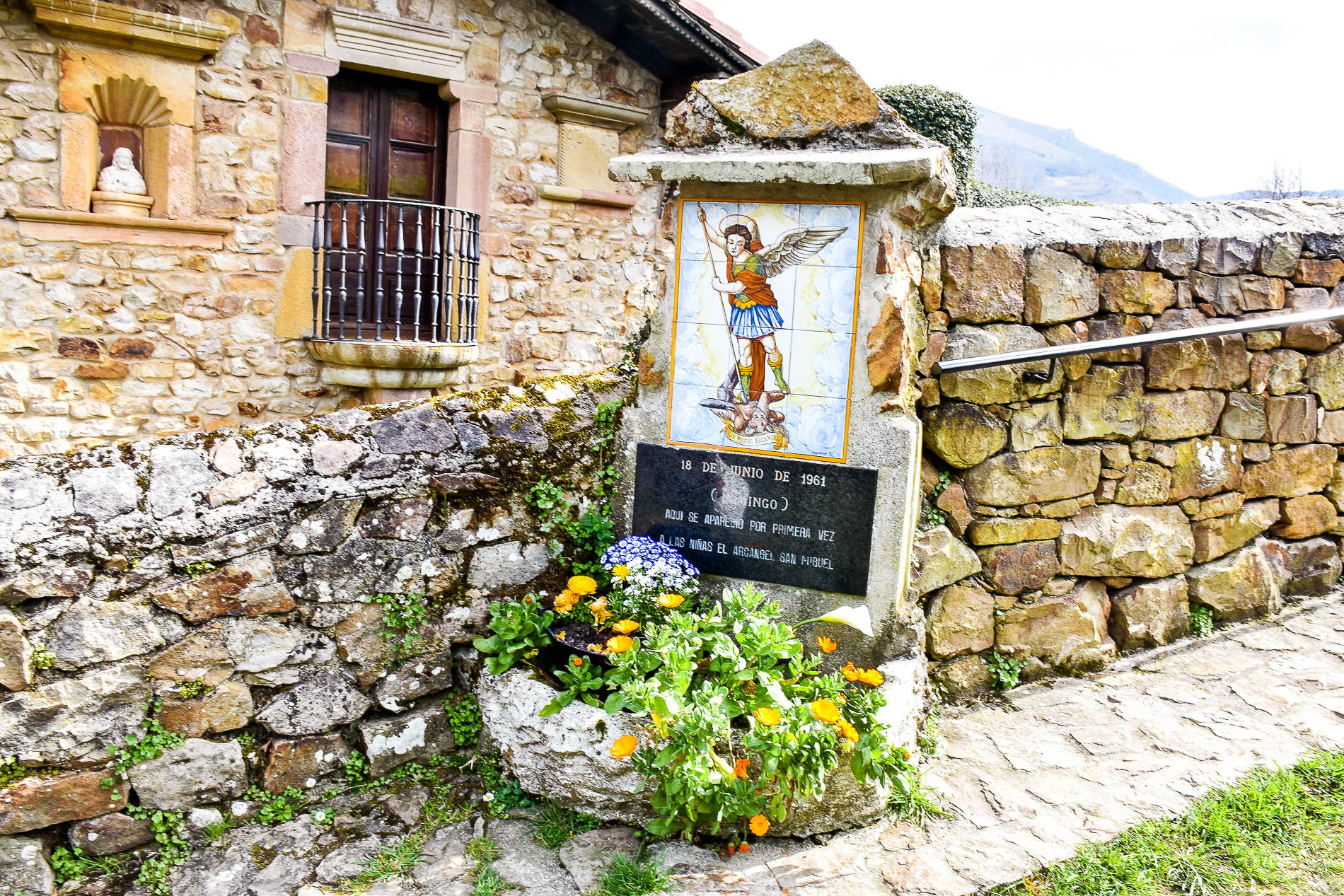
Site of the first apparition of Saint Michael the Archangel in Garabandal

The events at Garabandal began on June 18, 1961, with an apparition of Saint Michael the Archangel to four girls aged eleven and twelve years old:

- Mari Loli Mazón (May 1, 1949 – April 20, 2009)
- Jacinta González (b. April 27, 1949)
- Mari Cruz González (b. June 21, 1950)
- Maria "Conchita" Concepción González (b. February 7, 1949)

According to testimony from Conchita, as affirmed by the other three, they were playing with marbles, when an Angel appeared. In the translated words of Conchita: "I lifted my head and let out a scream, and then the others, seeing me in ecstasy, looked up and said, "The Angel is there!" The Angel is described as wearing a blue robe and having pink wings.

The angel is then said to have made five subsequent apparitions on the 26th, 28th, 29th and 30th of June as well as the 1st and 2nd of July.

The first apparition of the Virgin Mary was on July 2nd and many apparitions from both the Virgin Mary and the Angel occurred subsequently.

== Analysis ==
In December 1974, Dr. Ricardo Puncernau, President of the Spanish Association for Parapsychological Research, stated: "I have weighed, considered, and observed the matter thoroughly, and I have reached the following conclusion: There has never been, nor is there now, any other agent acting there - or in connection with the events there - than the Blessed Virgin."

In his book Person and God in a Spanish Valley, W. A. Christian, Jr., who spent some time in Garabandal, suggests that the alleged apparitions arose from a perceived threat to traditional local beliefs and practices due to some changes resulting from the Second Vatican Council.

The Garabandal apparitions had the support of members of the family of Prince Xavier of Bourbon-Parma, pretender to the Spanish and French thrones. Conchita González attended a public papal audience with some of the Bourbon-Parmas. There was, however, no private audience or special blessing as claimed.

== Content ==
According to the visionaries, the purpose of the visitations was to call for a "conversion of heart". The visionaries reported receiving two 'messages', one directly from the Blessed Virgin Mary and the other from the Virgin Mary by way of Saint Michael the Archangel.

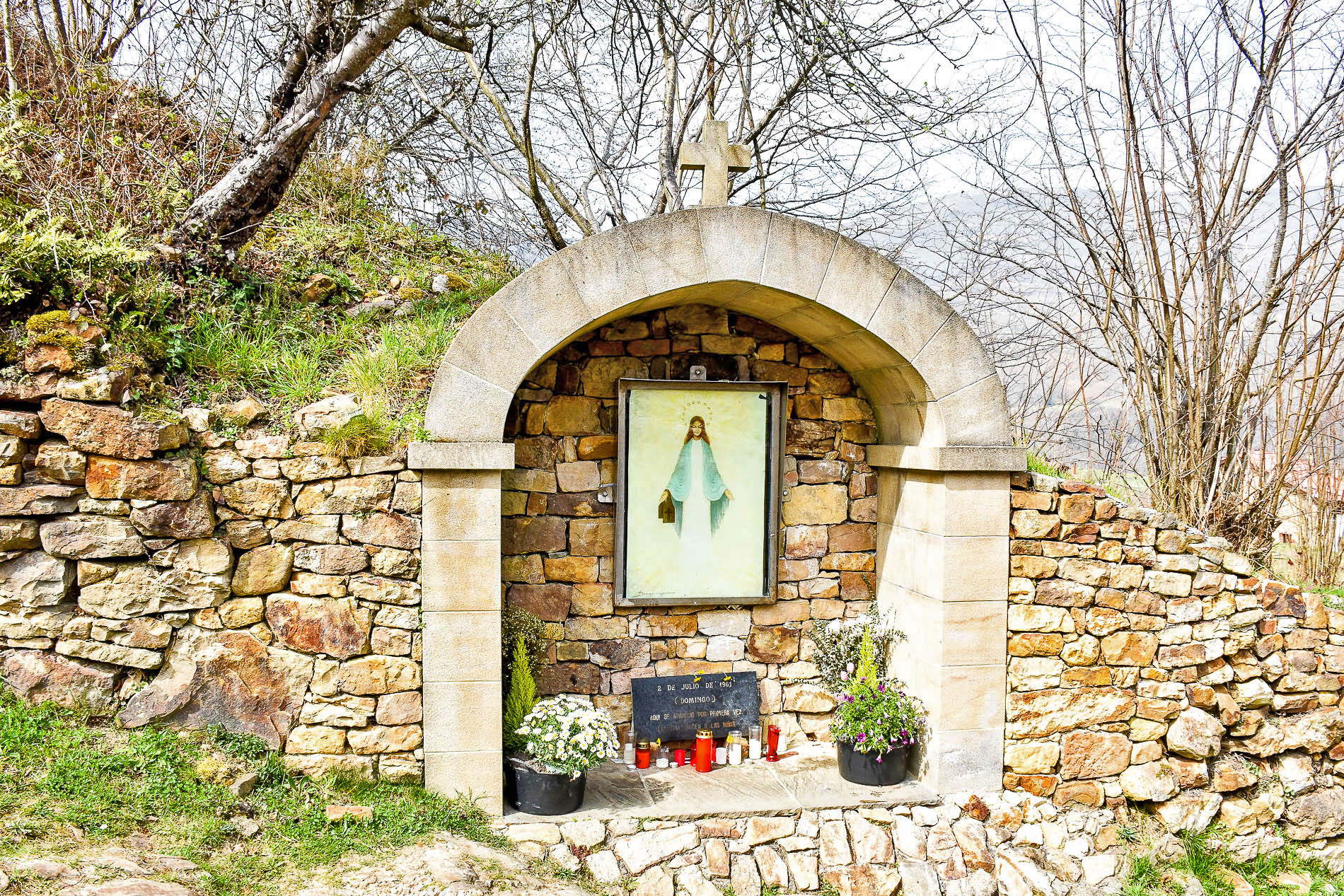
Site of the first apparition of the Blessed Virgin Mary in Garabandal

The first, revealed on October 18, 1961, states: "We must make many sacrifices, perform much penance, and visit the Blessed Sacrament frequently. But first, we must lead good lives. If we do not, a chastisement will befall us. The cup is already filling up, and if we do not change, a very great chastisement will come upon us."

The June 18, 1965, apparition, in which Conchita heard the second message, was televised live by Spanish television. Only Conchita González, regarded by most devotees of Garabandal as the "principal visionary", reported receiving the second message:

As my Message of the 18th of October has not been complied with, and as it has not been made known to the world, I am telling you that this is the last one. Previously, the Cup was filling; now, it is brimming over. Many Cardinals, Bishops and priests are following the road to perdition, and with them they are taking many more souls. Ever less importance is being given to the Holy Eucharist. We should turn the wrath of God away from us by our own efforts. If you ask His forgiveness with a sincere heart. He will pardon you. I, your Mother, through the intercession of St. Michael the Archangel, wish to tell you that you should make amends. You are now being given the last warnings. I love you very much, and I do not want your condemnation. Ask Us sincerely and We shall grant your plea...Reflect on the Passion of Jesus.

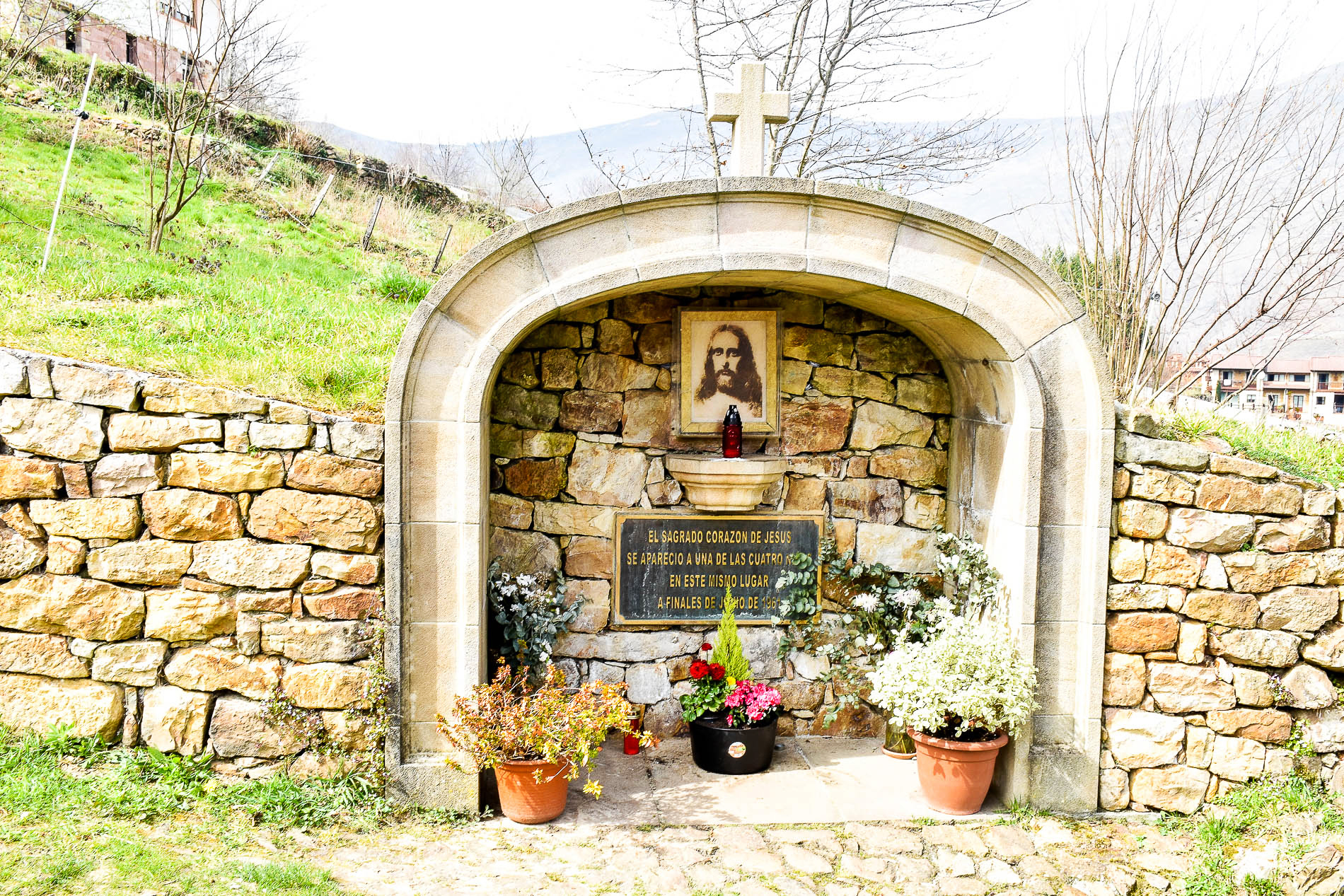
Site of an exceptional apparition of the Sacred Heart of Jesus in Garabandal in Garabandal

The second message caused particular controversy when it was revealed that Conchita had actually written "many cardinals, many bishops and many priests are following the road to perdition." She was asked many times to verify this information. The young woman stated many times that Mary stressed the importance of the priesthood, and focused attention on priests above others.

Besides the two "messages", the visionaries forecast a "warning", a "miracle" and a "punishment" (if people do not correct their ways). The warning is described as a momentary stopping of time around the world, with all people then seeing the spiritual condition of their souls, and how they should amend their ways. Within a year of the warning, a miracle will take place. The miracle will leave a permanent sign in Garabandal, which can be seen and photographed, but not touched. The "miracle" will occur between March and May. The "punishment", or "chastisement", is conditional upon how humankind reacts to the preceding "warning" and "miracle".

According to the Garabandal apparitions, after John XXIII there would be only three popes, or four including the brief reign of John Paul I, before the end of times.

In addition to the predicted events, devotees believe a "small" miracle took place in the early morning hours of July 19, 1961. A photo, reproduced in all books and websites on Garabandal, is said to be taken from a film in which a Holy Communion wafer materialized in Conchita's open mouth, supposedly put there by an angel. The girls often claimed that an angel gave them Communion, and were frequently seen going through the motions of receiving the Eucharist.

== Position of the Catholic Church ==
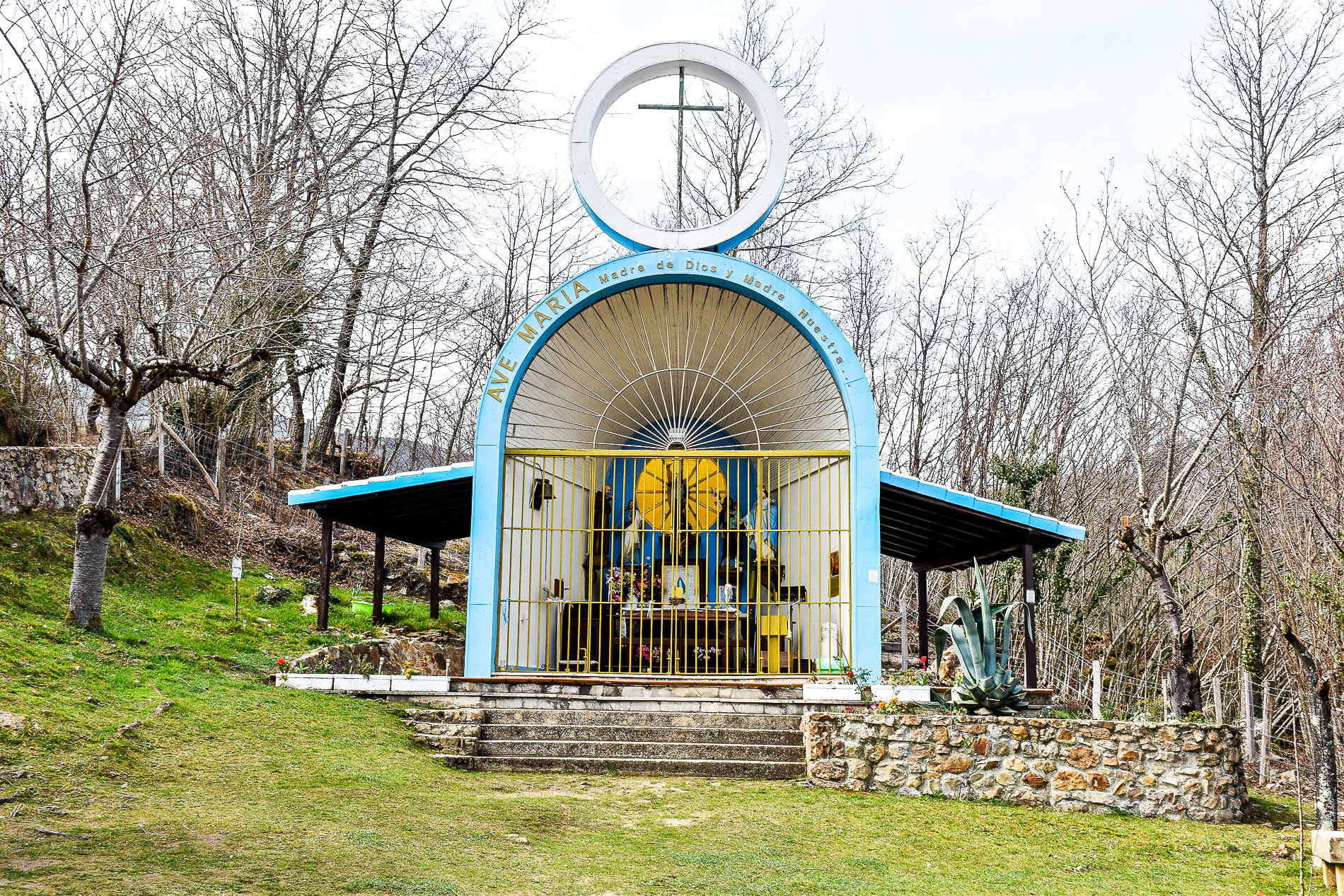
Small chapel placed in the mountain of Garabandal village dedicated to Saint Michael the Archangel

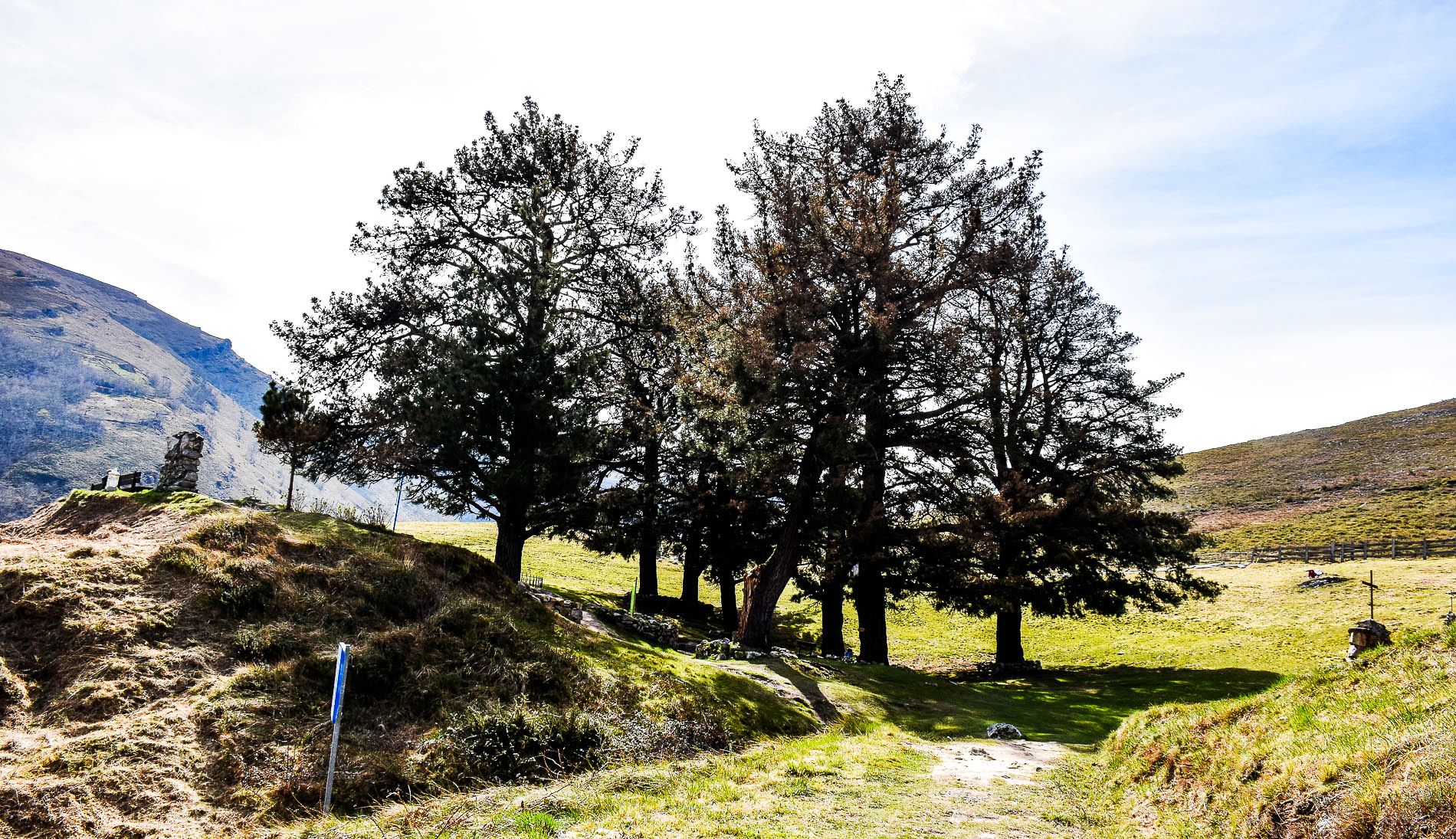
The famous «Pines of Garabandal» where many apparitions have been reported

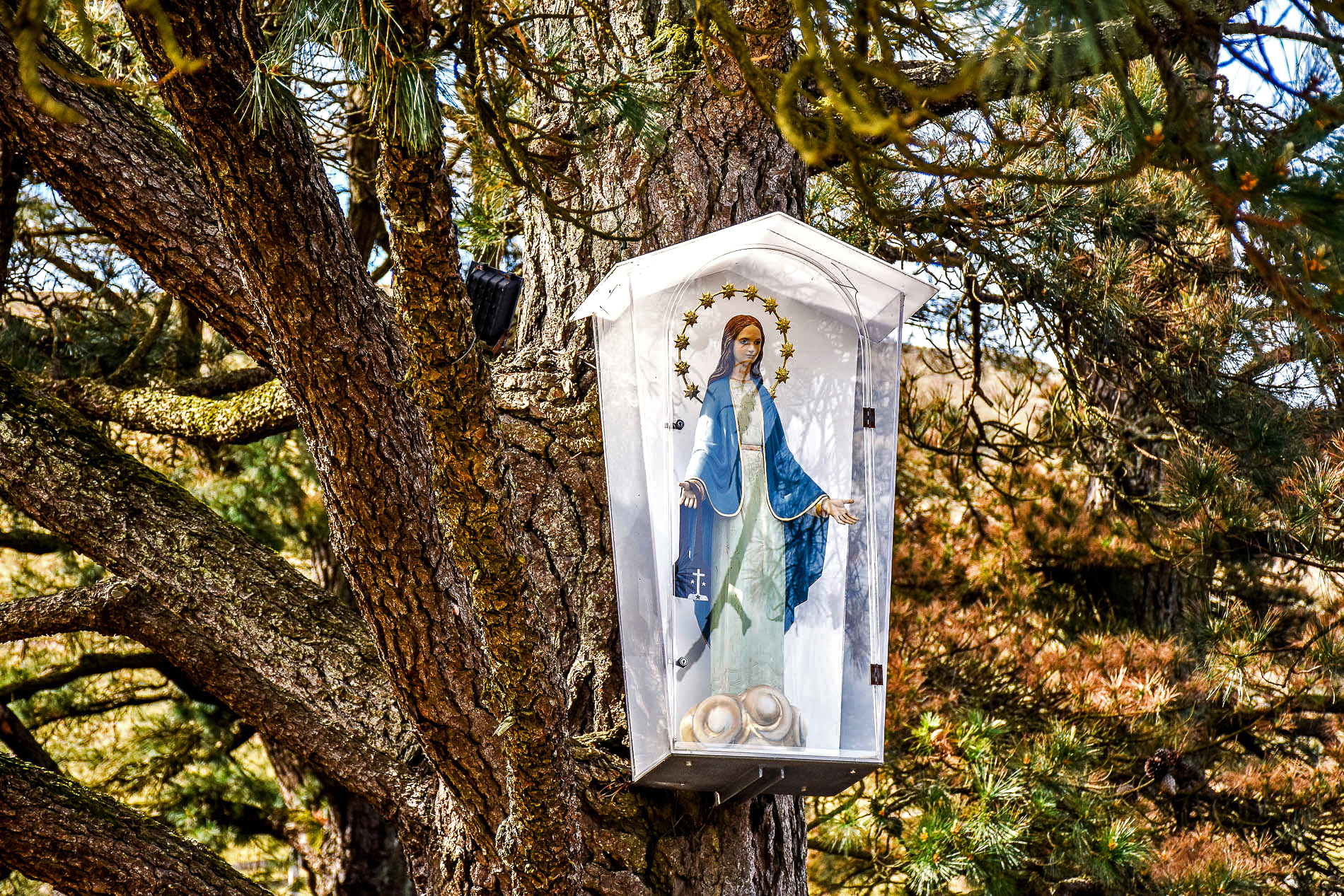
Venerated statue of Our Lady of Mount Carmel at the famous «Pines of Garabandal»

Past practice regarding approved apparitions indicates that in the absence of clear supernatural proof, neither the local bishop nor the Holy See is likely to approve an apparition. Authorities maintain a conservative attitude toward the apparitions. In accordance with usual procedure concerning claimed visitations, the Bishop of Santander has primary jurisdiction. Four successive bishops of Santander have viewed the supernatural character of Garabandal as unfounded.

On July 8, 1965, Bishop Eugenio Beitia of Santander wrote,

We point out, however, that we have not found anything deserving of ecclesiastical censorship or condemnation either in the doctrine or in the spiritual recommendations that have been publicized as having been addressed to the faithful, for these ...contain an exhortation to prayer and sacrifice, to Eucharistic devotion, to veneration of Our Lady in traditional praiseworthy ways, and to holy fear of God offended by our sins. They simply repeat the common doctrine of the Church in these matters.

In 1967 Bishop Vicente Puchol Montiz of Santander issued an "official note" declaring: "There was no apparition either of the Blessed Virgin or of St. Michael the Archangel or of any other celestial personage. There was no message. All the phenomena which occurred have a natural explanation." Despite claims from Garabandal devotees that jurisdiction lies with the Holy See, on May 10, 1969, the Congregation for the Doctrine of the Faith issued a declaration giving "full support to Bishop Montiz, saying he 'acted correctly in this matter, and in full accord with his authority.'"

Regarding the alleged Marian apparitions at Garabandal, Bishop Jose Vilaplana in 1993 stated that: "All the bishops of the diocese from 1961 through 1970 asserted that the supernatural character of the said apparitions, that took place around that time, could not be confirmed. [no constaba]. He further expressed the opinion that he did not find it necessary to reiterate this in a new declaration and give undue publicity to something which happened so long ago.

In a letter to Archbishop Philip M. Hannan of New Orleans, Louisiana, dated April 21, 1970, Cardinal Seper, Prefect of the Congregation for the Sacred Doctrine of the Faith, stated:

The Holy See has always held that the conclusions and dispositions of the Bishop of Santander were sufficiently secure guidelines for the Christian people and indications for the Bishops to order to dissuade people from participating in pilgrimages and other acts of devotion that are based on claims connected with or founded on the presumed apparitions and messages of Garabandal. In order to reply to certain doubts that you expressed in your letter this Sacred Congregation wishes to assert: that the Holy See has never approved even indirectly the Garabandal movement, that it has never encouraged or blessed Garabandal promoters or centers. Rather the Holy See deplores the fact that certain persons and Institutions persist in formatting the movement in obvious contradiction with the dispositions of ecclesiastical authority and thus disseminate confusion among the people especially among the simple and defenseless.

== Seers ==
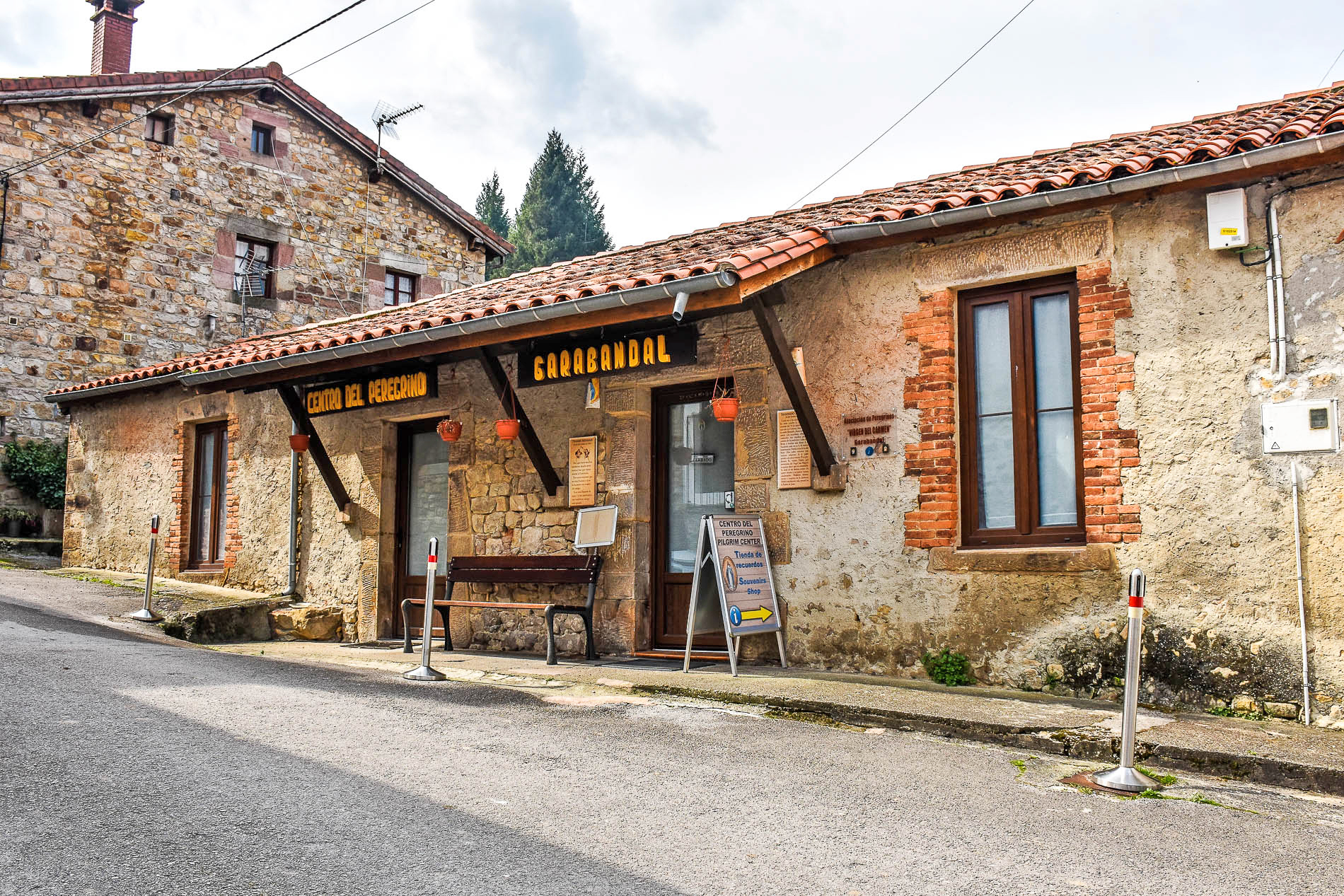
The Garabandal Pilgrim Center

In 1972, Mari Loli Mazón moved to the United States, where she would live for the next 37 years until her death in Plaistow, New Hampshire in 2009. Jacinta González became Jacinta Moynihan and is living in Oxnard, California, just north of Los Angeles with her husband, Jeffrey Moynihan and daughter Maria. Mari Cruz González lives in Aviles, Spain and is married with four children (Gabriel was born in 1975, Juan Carlos — in 1978, Lourdes — in 1981 and Ignacio — in 1985). Conchita González later went to the United States and married Patrick Keena in 1973; they live in New York City with their four children but they also maintain a house in Fátima, Portugal.

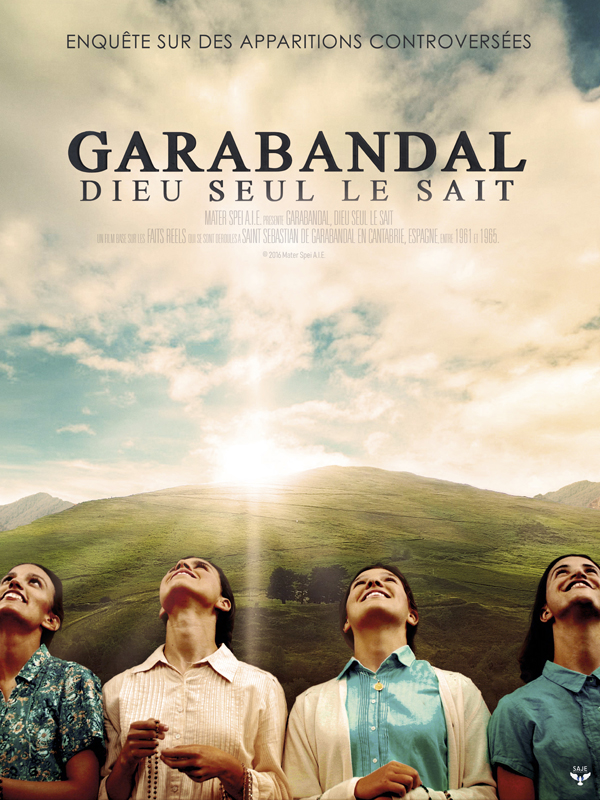
Garabandal: Only God Knows it is a historical film about the Marian apparitions that were reported in Garabandal, Spain

== Skepticism ==
Skeptical investigator Joe Nickell has written that the alleged Garabandal miracles came from anecdotal reports, never performed under conditions controlled by competent experts in deception. According to Nickell they have "the earmarks of childish stunts and simple tricks." Nickell also noted that on three occasions the "Garabandal visionaries retracted some statements they had made about their experiences."

== See also ==
- Marian apparitions
- San Sebastián de Garabandal
- Saint Michael the Archangel
- Our Lady of Mount Carmel
- Catholic Church in Spain
- List of Christian pilgrimage sites

== Bibliography ==
- Conchita González, 1965, Diario de Conchita de Garabandal
- Conchita González, 1983, Miracle at Garabandal, ISBN 0-385-18890-0
- Judith Albright, 1997, Our Lady at Garabandal, ISBN 1-880033-04-6
- Francisco Sanchez-Ventura y Pascual, 1965, The Apparitions of Garabandal, ISBN 978-0578512891
- José Luis Saavedra, 2017, Garabandal – Message of Hope: Recent Marian Apparitions, ISBN 978-8460655046
- Ted Flynn, 2024, Garabandal – the Warning and the Great Miracle: The Divine Reset That Will Correct the Conscience of the World, ISBN 978-0966805680
