= Fede San Emeterio =

Spanish footballer

Personal information
- Full name: Federico San Emeterio Díaz
- Date of birth: 16 March 1997 (age 29)
- Place of birth: Sierra de Ibio, Spain
- Height: 1.74 m (5 ft 9 in)
- Position: Central midfielder

Team information
- Current team: Ponferradina
- Number: 6

Youth career
- Textil Escudo
- 2007–2014: Racing Santander

Senior career*
Years	Team	Apps	(Gls)
2014–2016	Racing Santander	69	(1)
2016–2018	Sevilla B	77	(5)
2018–2022	Valladolid	65	(1)
2018–2019	→ Granada (loan)	36	(2)
2022	→ Cádiz (loan)	12	(0)
2022–2025	Cádiz	59	(1)
2025–	Ponferradina	23	(0)

International career
2015	Spain U19	3	(0)
- * Club domestic league appearances and goals as of 25 May 2026

Federico "Fede" San Emeterio Díaz (born 16 March 1997) is a Spanish professional footballer who plays as a central midfielder for Primera Federación club Ponferradina.

== Club career ==
=== Racing ===
Born in Sierra de Ibio, Mazcuerras, Cantabria, San Emeterio joined Racing de Santander's youth academy in 2007, aged 10. On 14 January 2014, before even having appeared with the reserves, he made his senior debut, coming on as a late substitute in a 2–0 away win against UD Almería for that season's Copa del Rey.

San Emeterio first appeared in the Segunda División B on 10 May, again from the bench in a 1–1 away draw with Coruxo FC. On 24 August he played his first match as a professional, replacing Javi Soria in the 64th minute of a 1–0 loss at Girona FC in the Segunda División.

San Emeterio contributed 35 appearances during the campaign, as his team suffered relegation. He scored his first senior goal on 4 October 2015, in a 2–0 victory at Sporting de Gijón B.

=== Sevilla ===
On 16 August 2016, both San Emeterio and his brother moved to another reserve team, signing a three-year contract with Sevilla Atlético in the second division. He netted three times from 39 games (all starts) in his second year, which ended in relegation after the last-place finish.

=== Valladolid ===
On 16 August 2018, San Emeterio joined Real Valladolid on a three-year deal, being immediately loaned to Granada CF in the second tier. He made his La Liga debut while at the service of the former club, starting the 1–1 away draw against Real Madrid on 24 August 2019.

=== Cádiz ===
On 6 January 2022, San Emeterio was loaned to top-flight side Cádiz CF until June, with a buyout clause. On 7 August, he agreed to a permanent four-year contract at the Nuevo Mirandilla.

San Emeterio all but missed the 2023–24 season, due to recurrent knee injuries. On 6 August 2025, he left by mutual consent.

== Personal life ==
San Emeterio's twin brother, Borja, is also a footballer. A defender, he too came through the ranks at Racing.

== Career statistics ==
As of match played 4 June 2023

Appearances and goals by club, season and competition
Club	Season	League			National cup		Total	
Club	Season	Division	Apps	Goals	Apps	Goals	Apps	Goals
Racing Santander	2013–14	Segunda División B	2	0	1	0	3	0
Racing Santander	2014–15	Segunda División	35	0	0	0	35	0
Racing Santander	2015–16	Segunda División B	32	1	0	0	32	1
Racing Santander	Total		69	1	0	0	70	1
Sevilla B	2016–17	Segunda División	38	2	—		38	2
Sevilla B	2017–18	Segunda División	39	3	—		39	3
Sevilla B	Total		77	5	0	0	77	5
Granada	2018–19	Segunda División	36	2	0	0	36	2
Valladolid	2019–20	La Liga	25	0	2	0	27	0
Valladolid	2020–21	La Liga	24	0	2	0	26	0
Valladolid	2021–22	Segunda División	16	1	2	0	18	1
Valladolid	Total		65	1	6	0	71	1
Cádiz	2021–22	La Liga	12	0	1	0	13	0
Cádiz	2022–23	La Liga	33	0	0	0	33	0
Cádiz	Total		45	0	1	0	46	0
Career total			292	9	8	0	300	9
