= Cabezón de la Sal =

- Municipality
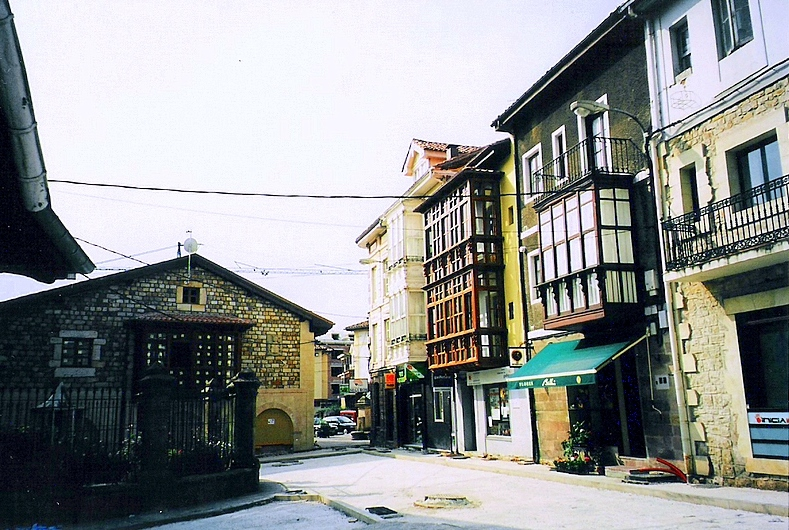
- Streets in Cabezón de la Sal

- Coat of arms

- Location of Cabezón de la Sal

- Location within Cantabria Cabezón de la Sal (Spain)
- Coordinates: 43°18′27″N 4°13′57″W
- Country: Spain
- Autonomous community: Cantabria
- Province: Cantabria
- Comarca: Saja and Nansa valleys
- Judicial district: Torrelavega
- Capital: Cabezón de la Sal

Government
  - Alcalde: Oscar López (PP)

Area
  - Total: 33.23 km^{2} (12.83 sq mi)
- Elevation: 128 m (420 ft)

Population (2023)
  - Total: 8,181
  - Density: 246.2/km^{2} (637.6/sq mi)
- Time zone: UTC+1 (CET)
  - Summer (DST): UTC+2 (CEST)
- Website: Official website

Cabezón de la Sal is a municipality located in the autonomous community of Cantabria, Spain. According to the 2023 census, the town has a population of 8,181 inhabitants.

== Festivals ==
The following are a list of festivals in Cabezón de la Sal:

- 2 February: Las Candelas in Casar de Periedo
- 9 March: La Castañera in Vernejo
- 29 June: Saint Peter in Carrejo
- Día de Cantabria or Día de la Montaña (Cantabrian day) celebrated on second Sunday of August.
- 16 August: San Roque in La Pesa district in Cabezón de la Sal, Bustablado and Duña.
- 12 October: El Pilar in Las Casucas (A famous district in the town of Cabezón de la Sal).
- 11 November: Saint Martin, patron saint of the town.

== Towns ==
The following are a list of towns within Cabezón de la Sal:

- Bustablado
- Cabezón de la Sal (Capital)
- Cabrojo
- Carrejo
- Casar
- Duña
- Ontoria
- Periedo
- Santibáñez
- Vernejo
- Virgen de la Peña
