= Lamasón =

- Municipality
- Flag

- Location of Lamasón

- Location in Spain
- Coordinates: 43°15′13″N 4°28′55″W
- Country: Spain
- Autonomous community: Cantabria
- Province: Cantabria
- Comarca: Saja-Nansa
- Judicial district: San Vicente de la Barquera
- Capital: Sobrelapeña

Government
  - Alcalde: Venancio Fernández Alonso (2007) (PRC)

Area
  - Total: 71.23 km^{2} (27.50 sq mi)
- Elevation: 240 m (790 ft)

Population (2025-01-01)
  - Total: 237
  - Density: 3.33/km^{2} (8.62/sq mi)
- Demonym: masoniegu/masoniego
- Time zone: UTC+1 (CET)
  - Summer (DST): UTC+2 (CEST)
- Website: Official website

Lamasón is a municipality located in the autonomous community of Cantabria, Spain. According to the 2007 census, the city has a population of 338 inhabitants. Its capital is Sobrelapeña.

== Towns ==
- Burió
- Cires
- Lafuente
- Los Pumares
- Quintanilla
- Río
- Sobrelapeña (capital)
- Venta Fresnedo
