= Puentenansa =

Coordinates: 43°15′12″N 4°24′21″W

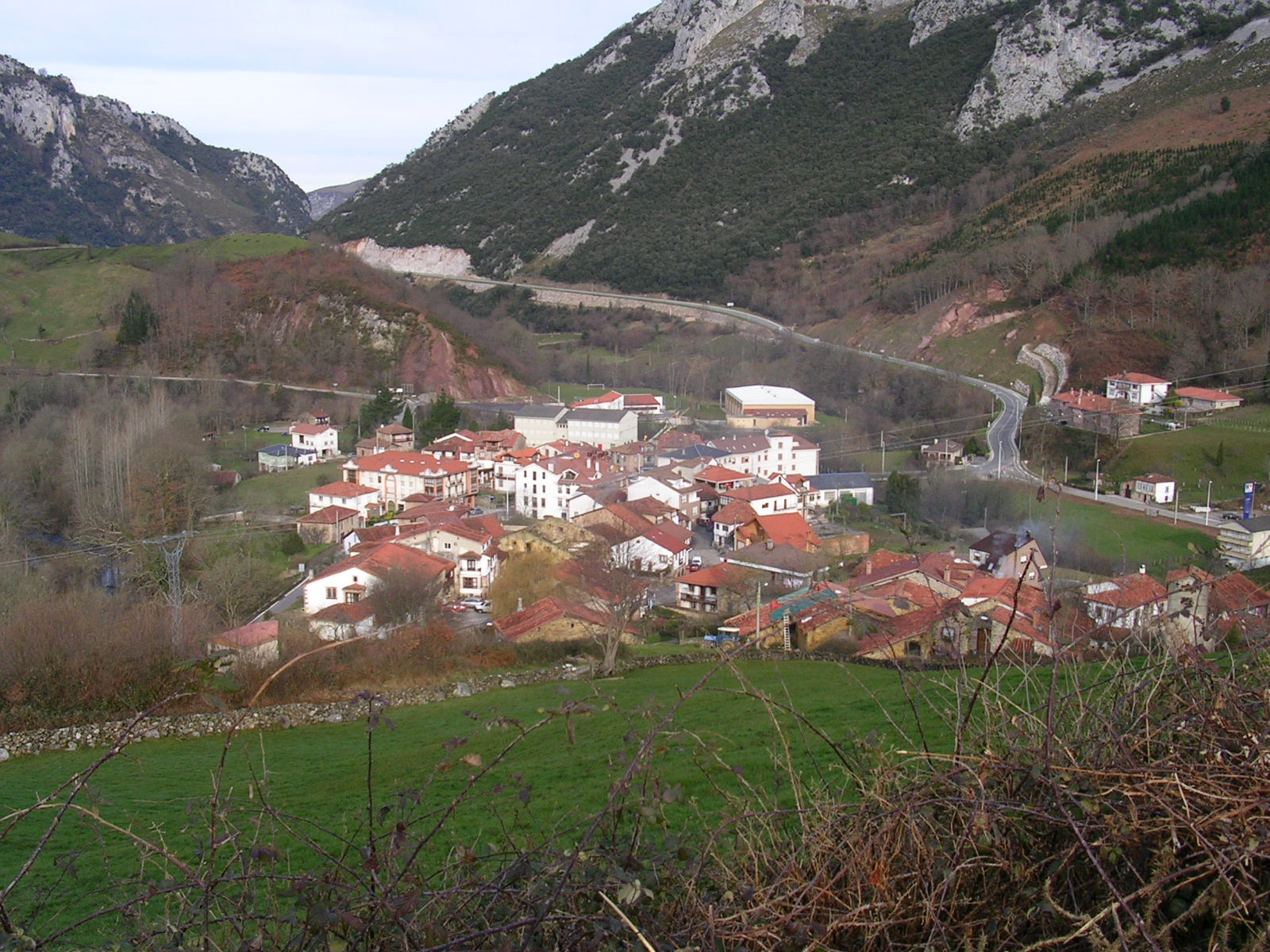
Bird's eye view of Puentenansa, Spain

Puentenansa is a village located in Cantabria in Spain. The town has estimates of 194 inhabitants. It is the capital of Rionansa municipality.
