= Tudanca =

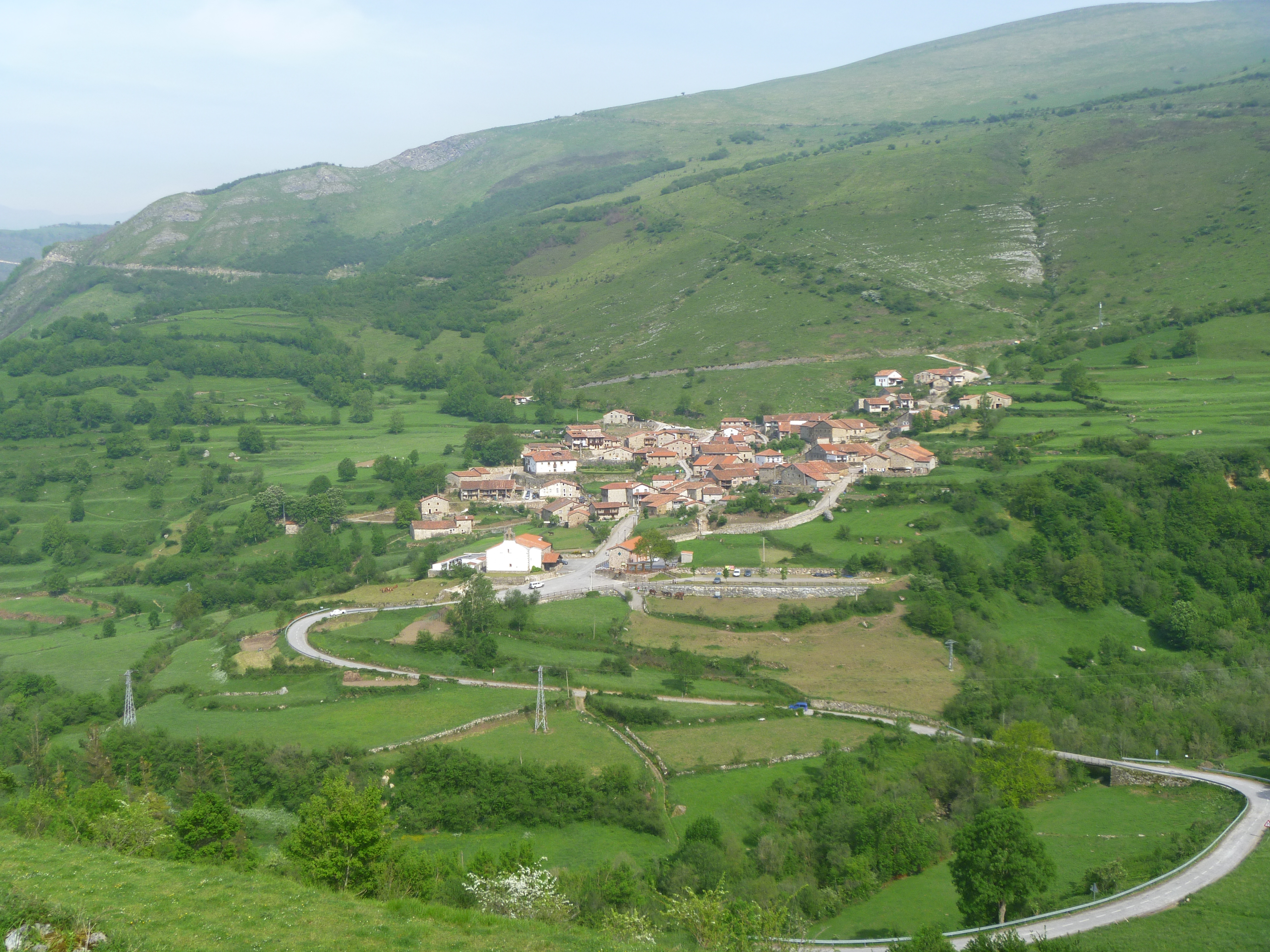
- View of Tudanca.

- Coat of arms

- Location in Spain. Tudanca (Spain)
- Coordinates: 43°9′46″N 4°22′8″W
- Country: Spain
- Autonomous community: Cantabria
- Province: Cantabria
- Comarca: Saja and Nansa valleys
- Judicial district: San Vicente de la Barquera

Area
  - Total: 52.44 km^{2} (20.25 sq mi)
- Elevation: 450 m (1,480 ft)

Population (2025-01-01)
  - Total: 154
  - Density: 2.94/km^{2} (7.61/sq mi)
- Time zone: UTC+1 (CET)
  - Summer (DST): UTC+2 (CEST)
- Website: www.aytotudanca.es

Tudanca is a municipality in Cantabria, Spain.
