= Cabuérniga =

- Municipality
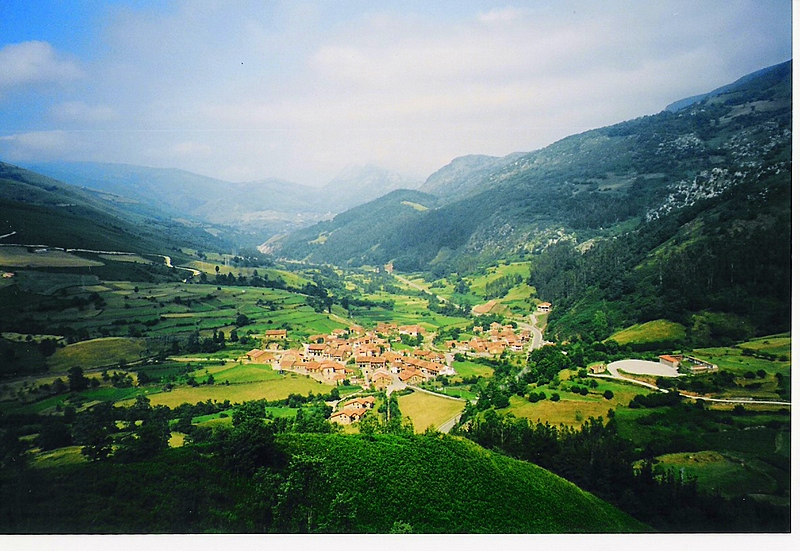

- Coat of arms

- Location of Cabuérniga

- Location of Cabuérniga in Cantabria and in Spain Cabuérniga (Spain)
- Coordinates: 43°13′40″N 4°18′1″W
- Country: Spain
- Autonomous community: Cantabria
- Province: Cantabria
- Comarca: Saja-Nansa
- Judicial district: Torrelavega
- Capital: Valle

Government
  - Alcalde: Nicolás Toral (2019) (PSOE)

Area
  - Total: 86.44 km^{2} (33.37 sq mi)
- Elevation: 260 m (850 ft)

Population (2025-01-01)
  - Total: 976
  - Density: 11.3/km^{2} (29.2/sq mi)
- Demonym(s): Cabuérnigu, ga
- Time zone: UTC+1 (CET)
  - Summer (DST): UTC+2 (CEST)
- Website: Official website

Cabuérniga (Spanish pronunciation: [kaˈβweɾniɣa]) is a municipality located in the autonomous community of Cantabria, Spain. According to the 2007 census, the city has a population of 999 inhabitants. Its capital is Valle.

One of its villages, Carmona, is listed as one of the most beautiful villages in Spain

== Notable people ==
- Manuel Llano (1898 - 1938). Writer and poet.
- Augusto González de Linares (1845 - 1904). Geologist.

== Gallery ==
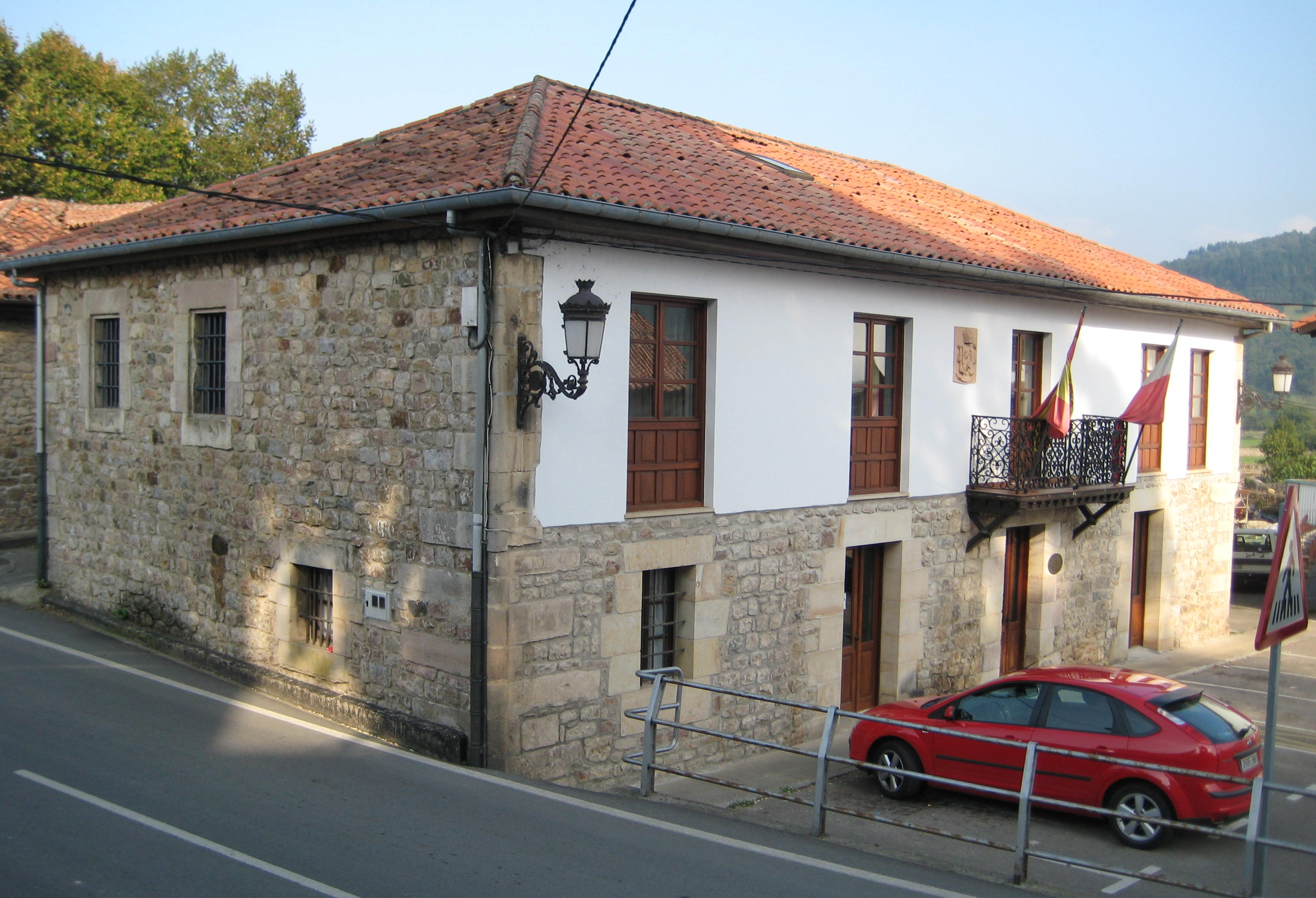
Cabuérniga's City Hall.

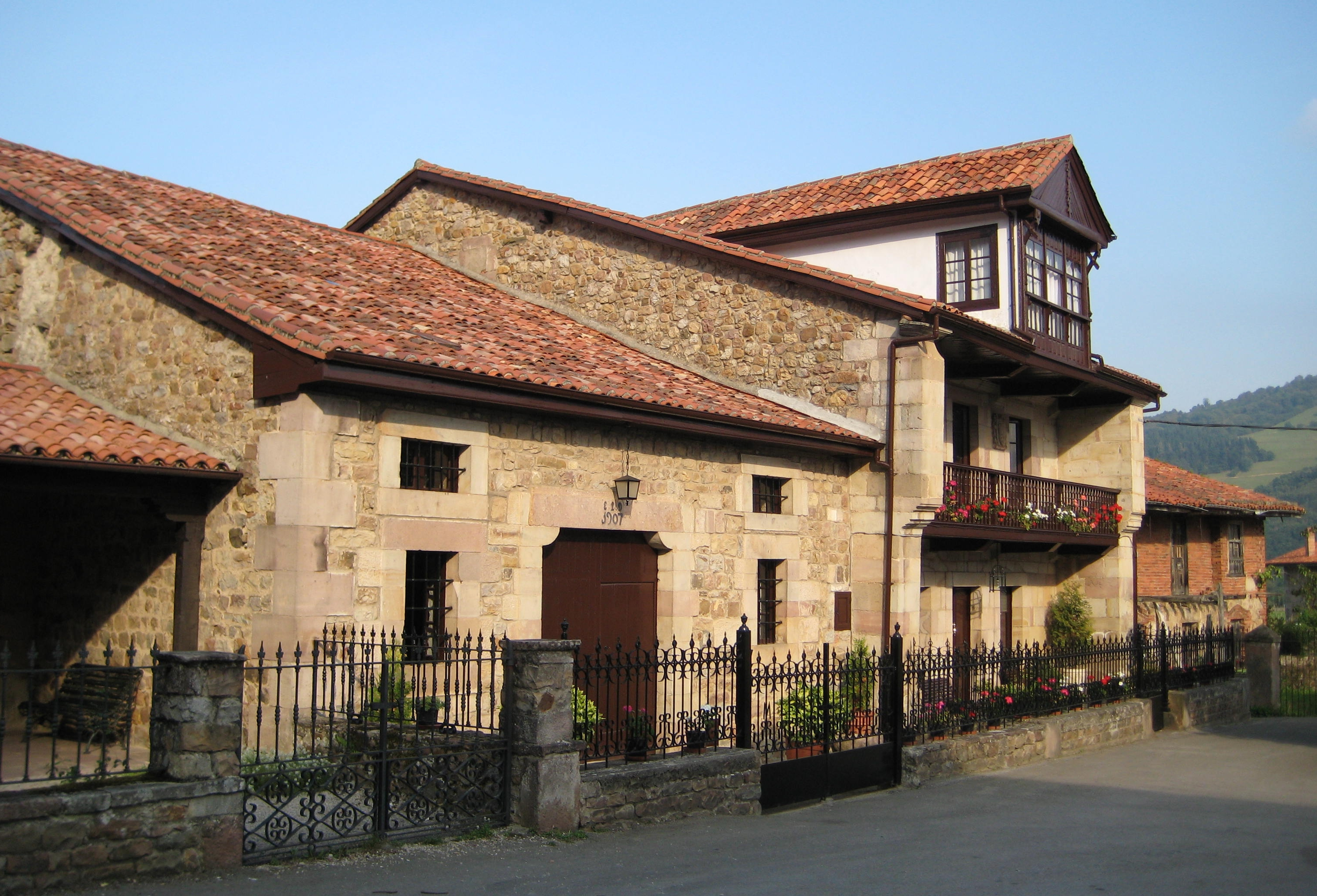
Typical house in Cabuérniga.
