= Mazcuerras =

- Municipality
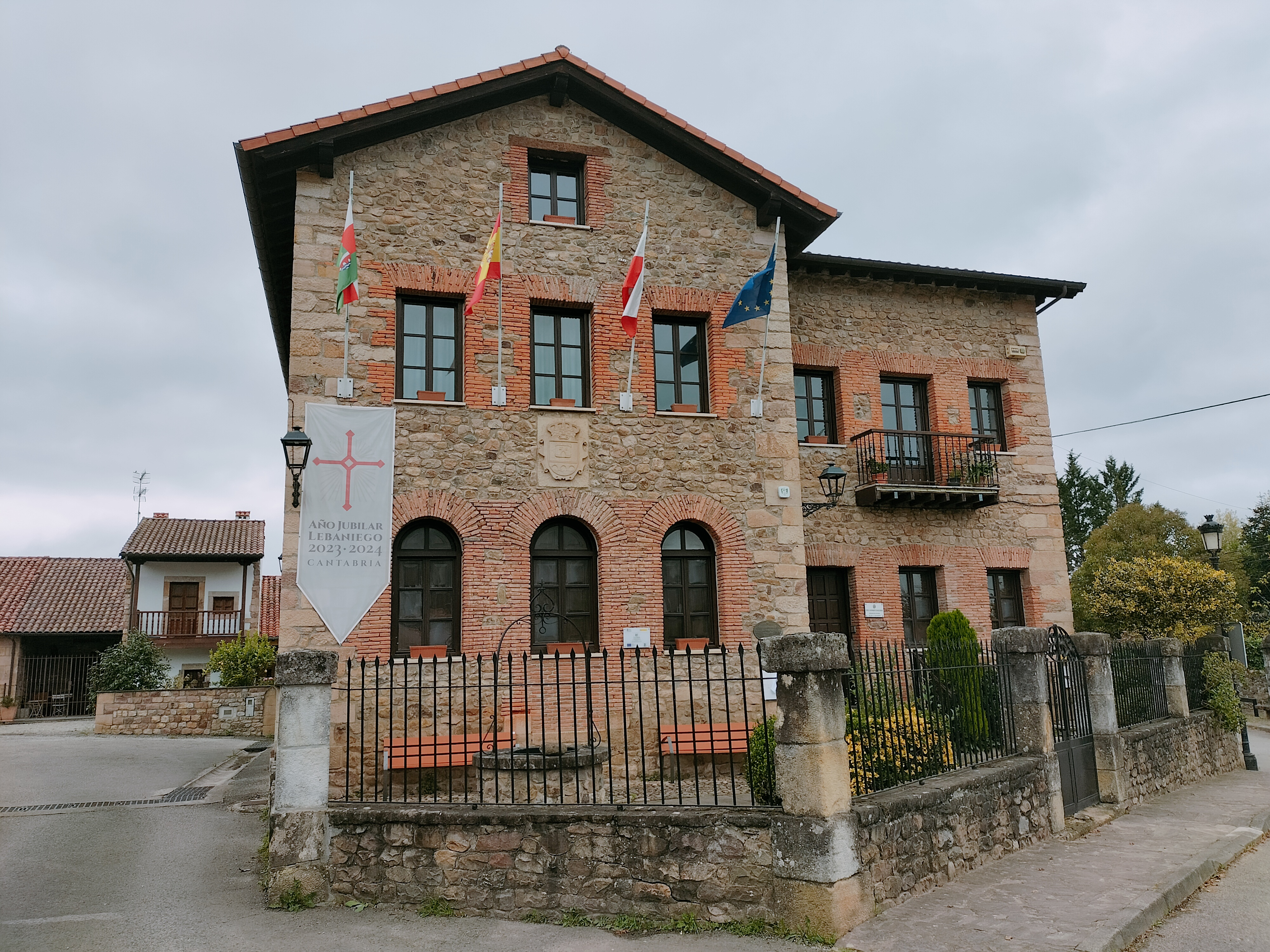
- Town hall

- Flag Coat of arms

- Location in Spain
- Coordinates: 43°17′55″N 4°12′24″W
- Country: Spain
- Autonomous community: Cantabria
- Province: Cantabria
- Comarca: Saja-Nansa
- Judicial district: Torrelavega

Government
  - Mayor: Celestino Fernández García

Area
  - Total: 55.65 km^{2} (21.49 sq mi)
- Elevation: 135 m (443 ft)

Population (2025-01-01)
  - Total: 2,068
  - Density: 37.16/km^{2} (96.25/sq mi)
- Time zone: UTC+1 (CET)
  - Summer (DST): UTC+2 (CEST)
- Website: Official website

Mazcuerras (Spanish pronunciation: [maθˈkweras]) is a municipality in the autonomous community of Cantabria, Spain.
