= Saja and Nansa valleys =

Coordinates: 43°14′47″N 4°20′16″W

Saja-Nansa
- Comarca
- Flag Coat of arms
- Country: Spain
- Autonomous community: Cantabria
- Province: Cantabria
- Capital: Cabezón de la Sal
- Municipalities: List: Cabezón de la Sal, Cabuérniga, Campoo-Cabuérniga, Herrerías, Lamasón, Mazcuerras, Peñarrubia, Polaciones, Reocín, Rionansa, Ruente, Los Tojos, Tudanca

Area
  - Total: 829.65 km^{2} (320.33 sq mi)

Population
  - Total: 23,334
  - Density: 28.125/km^{2} (72.844/sq mi)
- Demonym(s): cabuérnigo, -a
- Time zone: UTC+1 (CET)
  - Summer (DST): UTC+2 (CEST)

The Valleys of the Saja and Nansa Rivers comprise an administrative comarca in Cantabria, Spain. It is formed by the valleys of said rivers, each one being a natural comarca of its own.

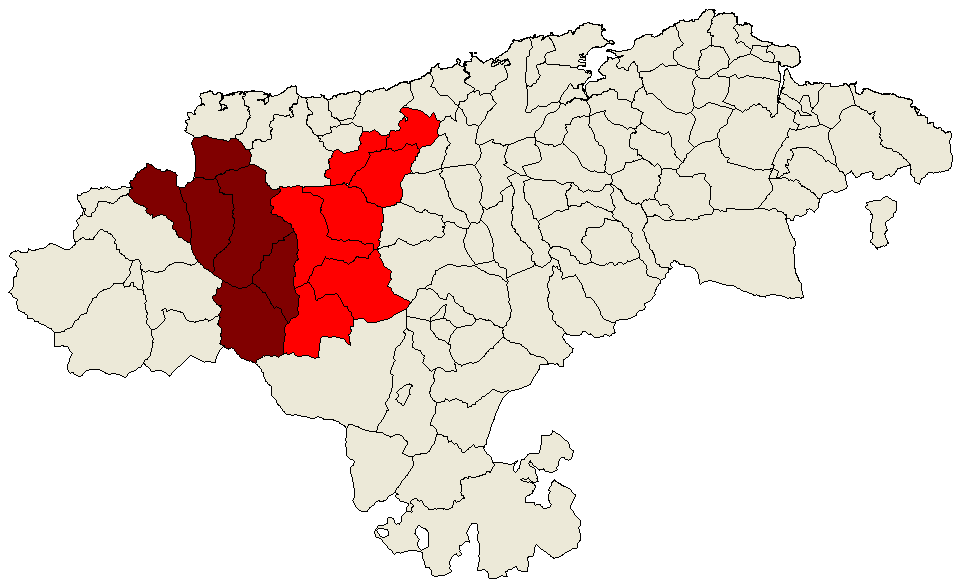
Comarca of Saja-Nansa in Cantabria. Saja valley in light red; Nansa valley in dark red.

== Saja valley ==
The valley of the Saja River, located in the autonomous community of Cantabria is formed by two natural comarcas.

- The mid-upper course, corresponding to the municipalities of Los Tojos, Cabuérniga, Ruente and the Mancomunidad Campoo-Cabuérniga, is called Cabuérniga Valley as a whole. It contains the rivers Argoza (which crosses the historic-artistic complex of Bárcena Mayor), Viaña, Lamiña and Bayones (which flows down the Uceda Mountains).
- From Hoz de Santa Lucía to San Pedro de Rudagüera it is called Cabezón Valley, containing the municipalities of Cabezón de la Sal, Mazcuerras and Reocín. Little past Rudagüera, in Torrelavega, the Besaya River flows into the valley until it reaches its mouth in the Ria of San Martín near Suances, flowing into the Bay of Biscay

This valleys share the varied relief of the Cantabrian Mountains. In the upper course can be found the Cordel mountains, the mountain ranges of Bárcena Mayor, the mounts of Cabuérniga and Ucieda and the Sierra del Escudo de Cabuérniga where the Hoz of Santa Lucía is formed. After that, the geography smooths, with larger lowlands, bordered by the Ibio Ranges and the small pre-coastal hills.

== Nansa valley ==
Valley and natural comarca of Cantabria; located between the valleys of Liébana and Saja. It is bordered by the Escudo Range on the north and the Peña Labra Range on the south. Through the Nansa valley flows the river of the same name, which forms remarkably steep slopes at its sides, due to its torrential and eroding nature, chiefly at the first part of its course. The municipalities comprehended by the Nansa valley are: Lamasón, Rionansa, Tudanca, Polaciones and the part of Cabuérniga corresponding to the village of Carmona.

The comarca has a great landscape quality, thanks to its high peaks characteristics, large native forests (mostly oaks and beeches), and low population density, mostly dedicated to cattle farming.
