= Western coast of Cantabria =

Coordinates: 43°22′17″N 4°17′14″W

Costa Occidental
- Comarca
- Flag Coat of arms
- Country: Spain
- Autonomous community: Cantabria
- Province: Cantabria
- Capital: San Vicente de la Barquera
- Municipalities: List: Val de San Vicente, San Vicente de la Barquera, Valdáliga, Comillas, Udías, Ruiloba, Alfoz de Lloredo, Santillana del Mar

Area
  - Total: 317.84 km^{2} (122.72 sq mi)

Population
  - Total: 20,192
  - Density: 63.529/km^{2} (164.54/sq mi)
- Demonym: costeroocidental
- Time zone: UTC+1 (CET)
  - Summer (DST): UTC+2 (CEST)

The Western Coast of Cantabria is a comarca of the Cantabria Spanish autonomous community which comprises the municipalities of Val de San Vicente, San Vicente de la Barquera, Valdáliga, Comillas, Udías, Ruiloba, Alfoz de Lloredo and Santillana del Mar.

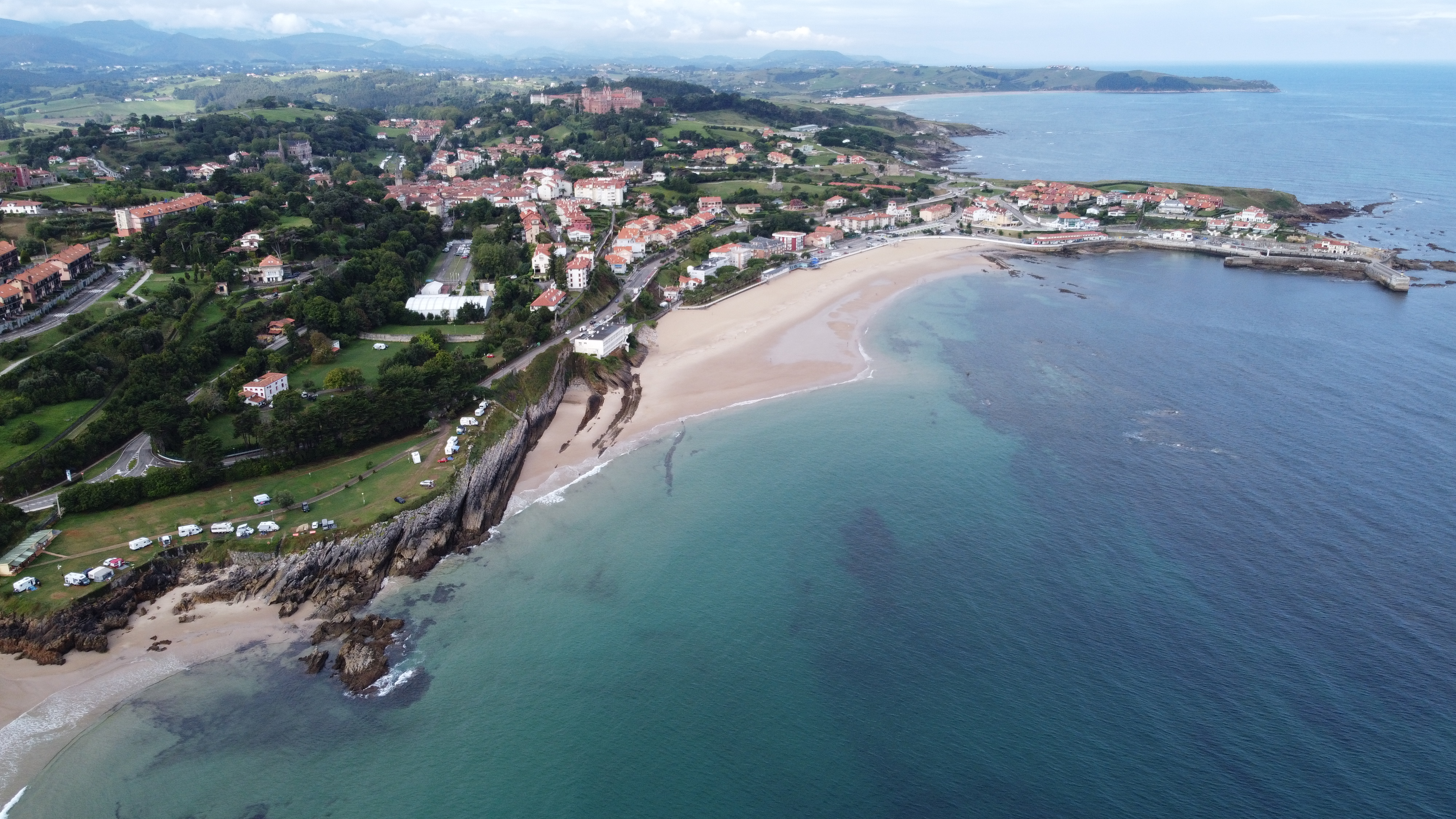
Beach of Comillas

As its own name indicates, this comarca extends over the western coast of the autonomous community, from its border with Asturias by the mouth of the Deva River, to the Saja-Besaya mouth in Suances, although these limits may vary depending on the source, since this comarca, as in the rest of Cantabria's, is not regulated, but there are common characteristic elements in the municipalities that belong to it.

This zone attracts tourists for its beaches, nature, gastronomy and culture. Santillana del Mar, Comillas, Suances and San Vicente de la Barquera are the municipalities that are the main destinations for tourists.

Three of the longest rivers of Cantabria flow into the Western coast: The Deva, the Nansa and the Saja-Besaya. In addition to the numerous beaches, the Oyambre Natural Park and Mount Corona stand out as natural attractions.

As has been mentioned, the culture of the zone is quite remarkable, since many cultural spots are concentrated within a few kilometers radius: the Altamira Cave and Museum, the Zoologic and Botanic Garden, the Collegiate Church in Santillana del Mar; and the Sobrellano Palace, the Comillas Pontifical University and the Gaudí Caprice in Comillas.

The Cantabrian West is a mainly touristic comarca, that opposed to the East, it had remained safe from the massive house buildings because of the lateness of the construction of the Cantabrian Motorway, completed in the early 2000s

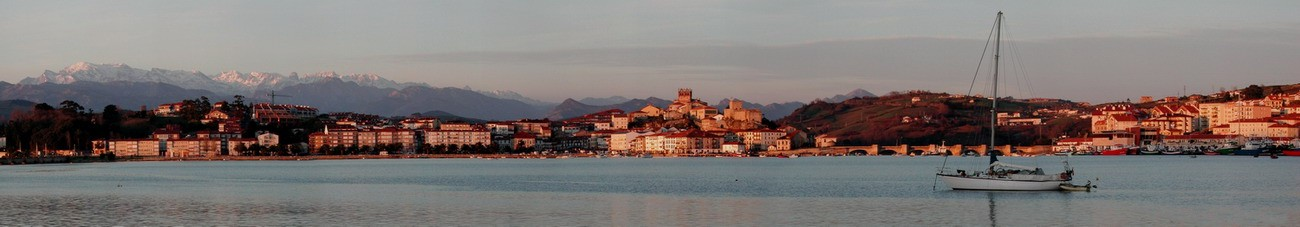
Panorama of San Vicente de la Barquera, with Picos de Europa on the background
