= Udías =

- Municipality
- Flag Coat of arms

- Location of Udías

- Location in Spain
- Coordinates: 43°20′18″N 4°14′49″W
- Country: Spain
- Autonomous community: Cantabria
- Province: Cantabria
- Comarca: Western Coast
- Judicial district: San Vicente de la Barquera
- Capital: Pumalverde

Government
  - Alcalde: Fernando Fernández Sampedro

Area
  - Total: 19.64 km^{2} (7.58 sq mi)
- Elevation: 181 m (594 ft)

Population (2025-01-01)
  - Total: 960
  - Density: 49/km^{2} (130/sq mi)
- Time zone: UTC+1 (CET)
  - Summer (DST): UTC+2 (CEST)

Udías is a municipality located in the autonomous community of Cantabria, Spain.

== Localities ==
- Canales.
- Cobijón.
- La Hayuela.
- El Llano.
- Pumalverde (Capital)
- Rodezas.
- Toporias.
- Valoria.
- La Virgen.
