= Colindres =

- Municipality
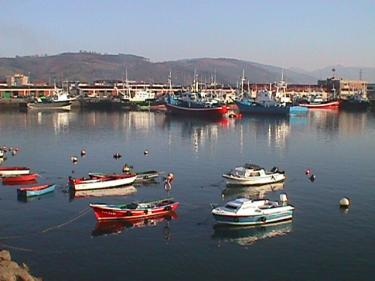
- Ships in Colindres.

- Flag Coat of arms

- Location of Colindres

- Location in Spain
- Coordinates: 43°23′48″N 3°26′54″W
- Country: Spain
- Autonomous community: Cantabria
- Province: Cantabria
- Comarca: Eastern coast of Cantabria
- Judicial district: Laredo
- Capital: Colindres

Government
  - Alcalde: Javier Incera Goyenechea (PSOE)

Area
  - Total: 5.94 km^{2} (2.29 sq mi)
- Elevation: 10 m (33 ft)
- Highest elevation: 281 m (922 ft)
- Lowest elevation: 0 m (0 ft)

Population (2025-01-01)
  - Total: 8,570
  - Density: 1,440/km^{2} (3,740/sq mi)
- Demonym(s): colindrés/esa, pejino/a
- Time zone: UTC+1 (CET)
  - Summer (DST): UTC+2 (CEST)
- Postal code: 39750
- Website: Official website

For people with the surname, see Colindres (surname).

Colindres is a town in the northern Spanish province and autonomous community of Cantabria. Located between the cities of Santander and Bilbao, Colindres has a population of 8,453 (INE 2018).

== Overview ==
In Colindres, the Asón River flows into the Cantabrian Sea, forming the Santoña estuary, which is the most important SPA in northern Spain, which is also known as the Santoña, Victoria and Joyel Marshes Natural Park, which Colindres is a part of. The town has the second fishing port in the region.

Its festivities during the summer are very popular in the region, and perhaps the most popular and the one which attracts the most people is the folk music festival SAUGA. Colindres' neighboring city, Laredo, has a long beach, La Salvé, with more than 5 km. this is the best place of cantabria .

== Sister cities ==
- Le Haillan (France)

== Notable people ==
- Antonio Laserna (1752–1823), bibliographer and writer
