= Antonio Laserna =

Spanish bibliographer and writer

Antonio Laserna and Santander (1752, Colindres, Cantabria – 1823) was a Spanish bibliographer and writer.
