= Liendo =

- Municipality
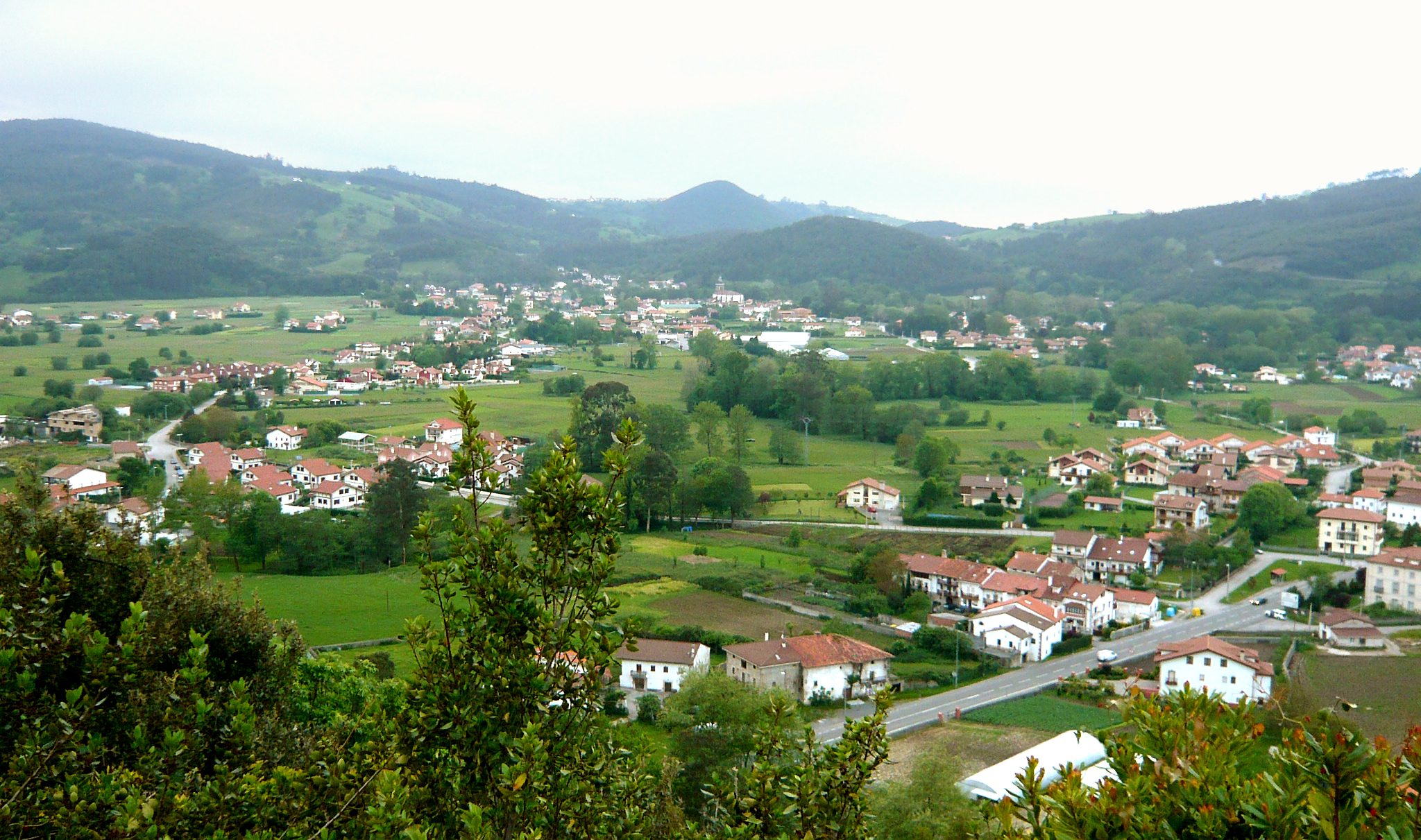

- Flag Coat of arms

- Location of Liendo

- Location in Spain
- Coordinates: 43°23′42″N 3°22′44″W
- Country: Spain
- Autonomous community: Cantabria
- Province: Cantabria
- Comarca: Eastern coast of Cantabria
- Judicial district: Laredo
- Capital: Hazas

Government
  - Alcalde: Juan Alberto Rozas Fernández (2011) (PP)

Area
  - Total: 25.96 km^{2} (10.02 sq mi)
- Elevation: 30 m (98 ft)

Population (2025-01-01)
  - Total: 1,218
  - Density: 46.92/km^{2} (121.5/sq mi)
- Time zone: UTC+1 (CET)
  - Summer (DST): UTC+2 (CEST)
- Website: Official website

Liendo is a municipality located in the autonomous community of Cantabria, Spain. According to the 2007 census, the city had a population of 995 inhabitants. Its capital is Hazas.

== Geography ==
Liendo is a municipality in the autonomous community of Cantabria, Spain, located in its east-coast region, 52 kilometers from Santander, bordering laredo and Castro Urdiales. Unlike other coastal towns it does not have extensive beaches, but a spectacular cliff coastline. It is seated in a green valley, especially suitable for agriculture, composed of thirteen districts.

The dead end valley is enclosed by mountains and contains a low altitude endorheic river network which drains into a single sinkhole or ponor, known as "Eye of Rucueva" in the neighborhood of Isequilla, a peculiarity characteristic of a polje.

The coastline is very rugged, offering the highest cliffs in the region. There are two small coves, sheltered from the majestic Mount Candina and Yesera, which contain the beach of San Julián and the beach of Valdearenas (or Sonabia). Access to the latter exists only from Oriñón in Castro Urdiales.

== Human geography ==
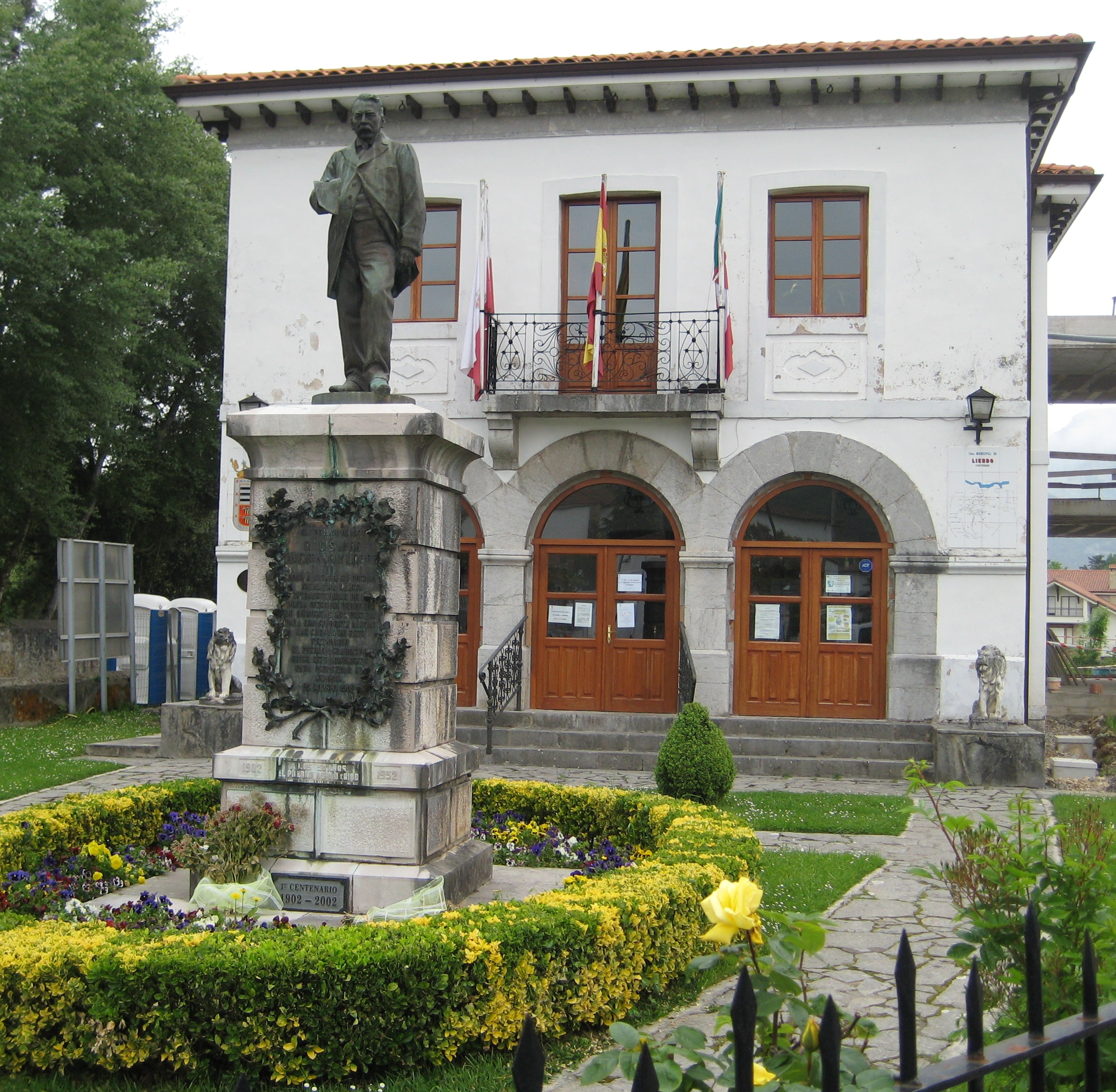
Liendo Town Hall.

Liendo has a long heritage and archaeological caves. The houses around Hazas, the capital city are grouped according to the remaining twelve districts. Highlights include civic buildings, stately homes with masonry facade on farms. Highlight is the mansion Albo, in Iseca Vieja neighborhood.

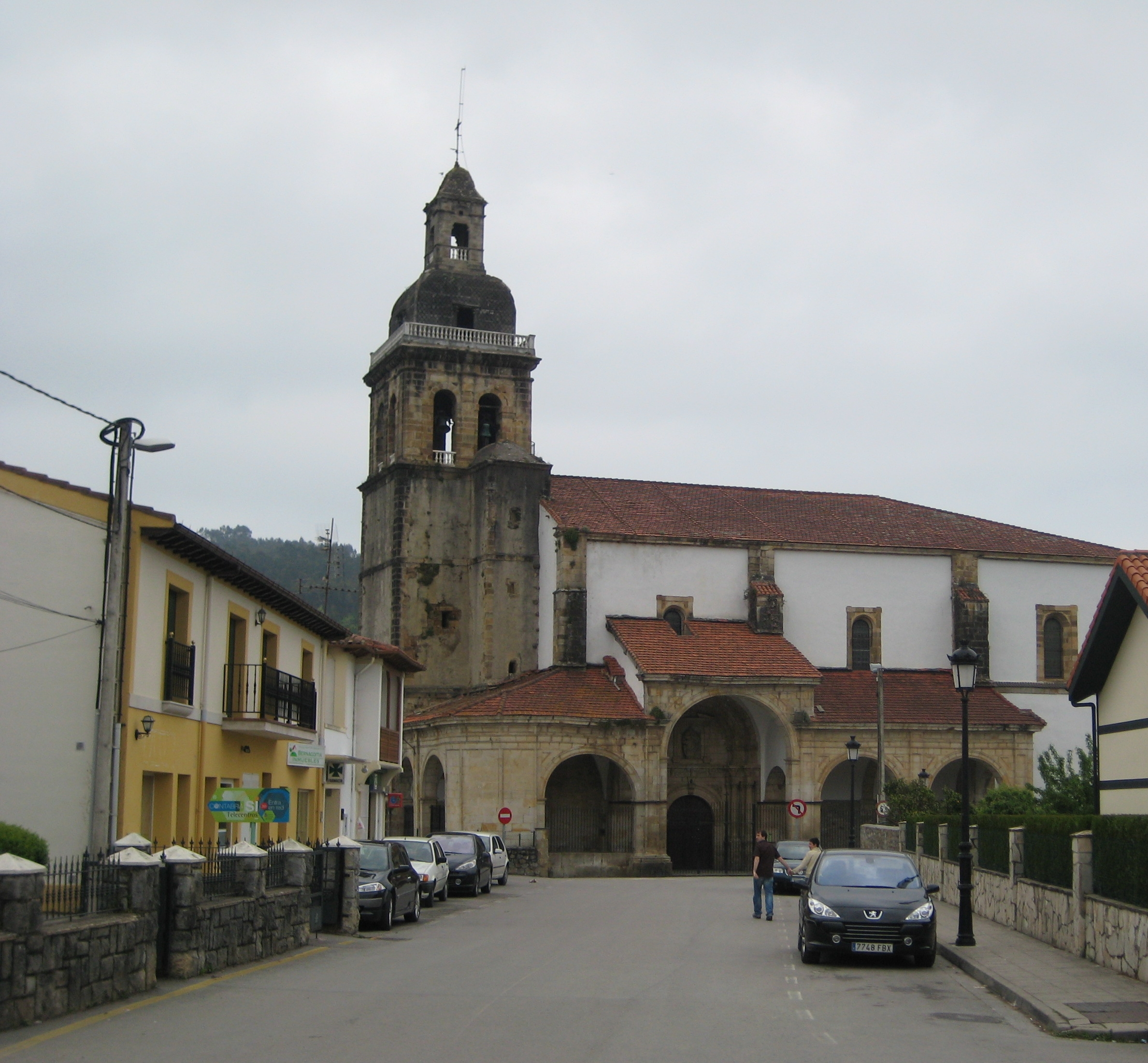
Church of the Assumption of Our Lady in Hazas, Liendo, Cantabria.

The Church dedicated to "Our Lady of the Assumption of Liendo", is a Site of Local Interest since 2002. Monumental church with a rich interior. The temple has a porch on the south and gateway half a point in double columns and niches at the top. Excellent is also the tower.

La Ermita de San Andrés and Roman bridge access to it, well inventoried since 2002. It is in the neighborhood of Villaviad. La Ermita de San Julian, now in ruins, is situated with beautiful views across the valley. It is the oldest building in the city, dated to the end of the 12th or the beginning of the 13th century.

Beaches include Playa San Julian and Vadelarenas beach. Starting from the Iseca Vieja neighborhood, one of the most emblematic is the beach of San Julian, with barely 180 meters in length it is frequented every summer. Immersed in a unique landscape among steep coastal cliffs, it is the only beach that is accessible from the valley itself. Just before reaching the beach, a path leads to the ruins of the hermitage of San Julian. The view of the green valley of Valle Liendo from here contrasts with the cliffs from the beach of San Julian. Vadelarenas beach (or Sonabia) 3.5 km from Oriñón is a sheltered beach of 154 meters in length, with sloping drop. There are several paths for pedestrian access, often erroneously considered property of the municipality of Castro Urdiales.
