= Eastern coast of Cantabria =

Coordinates: 43°24′07″N 3°24′45″W

Costa Oriental Costa Esmeralda
- Comarca
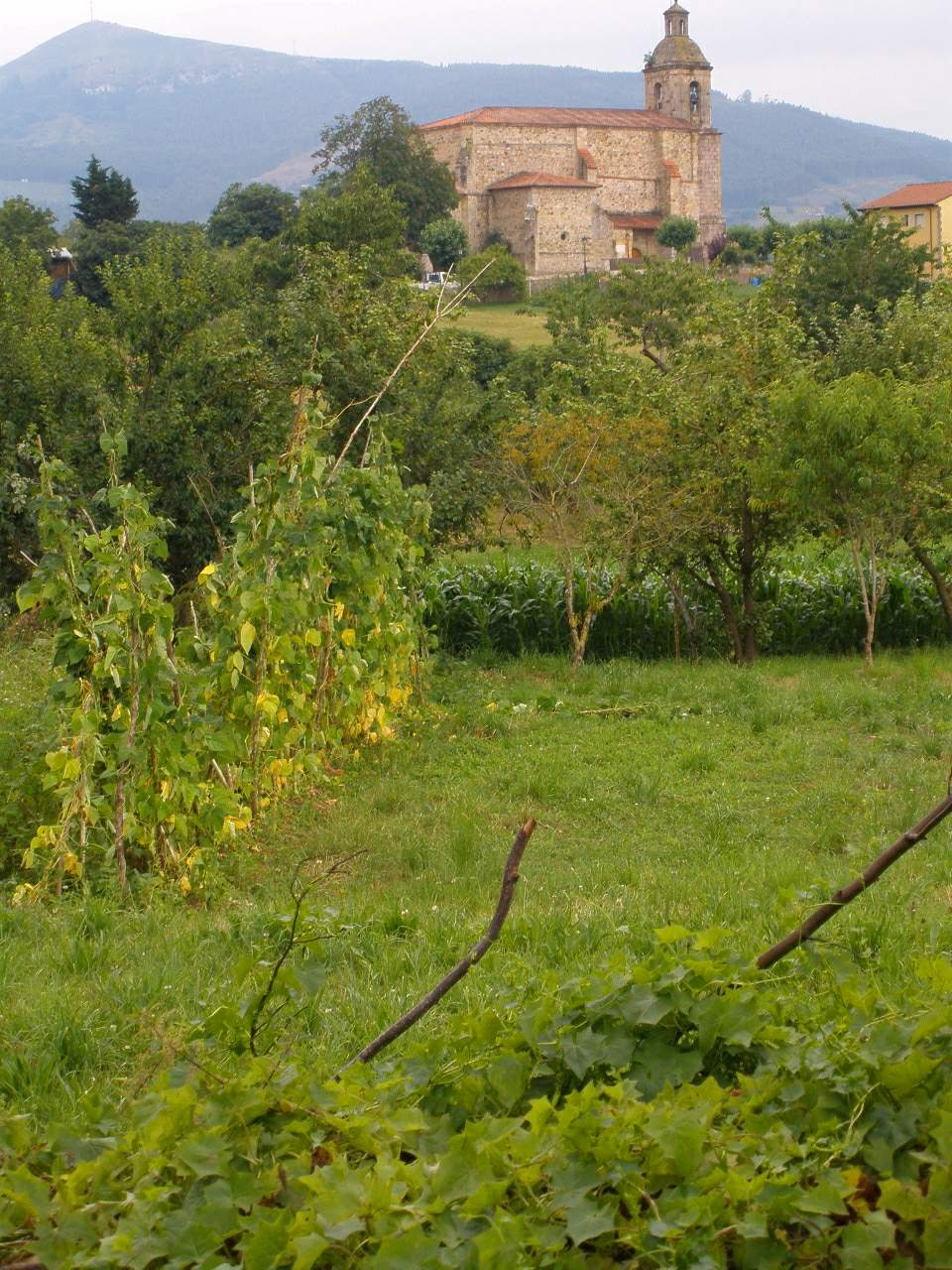
- Colindres

- Country: Spain
- Autonomous community: Cantabria
- Province: Cantabria
- Capital: Laredo
- Municipalities: List: Castro Urdiales, Colindres, Laredo, Liendo

Area
  - Total: 144.26 km^{2} (55.70 sq mi)

Population (2018)
  - Total: 52,772
  - Density: 365.81/km^{2} (947.45/sq mi)
- Time zone: UTC+1 (CET)
  - Summer (DST): UTC+2 (CEST)
- Largest municipality: Castro Urdiales

The Eastern Coast of Cantabria is a comarca (shire, but with no administrative role) in the autonomous community of Cantabria, northern Spain, that comprises the municipalities of Colindres, Laredo, Liendo and Castro Urdiales.

== Municipalities ==
There are 4 municipalities comprising the comarca, listed below with their areas and populations:

Name	Area (km^{2})	Population (2001)	Population (2011)	Population (2018)
Castro Urdiales	96.7	21,081	32,487	31,977
Colindres	5.9	6,924	8,109	8,453
Laredo	15.7	12,559	12,088	11,148
Liendo	26.0	889	1,284	1,194
