= Alfoz de Lloredo =

- Municipality
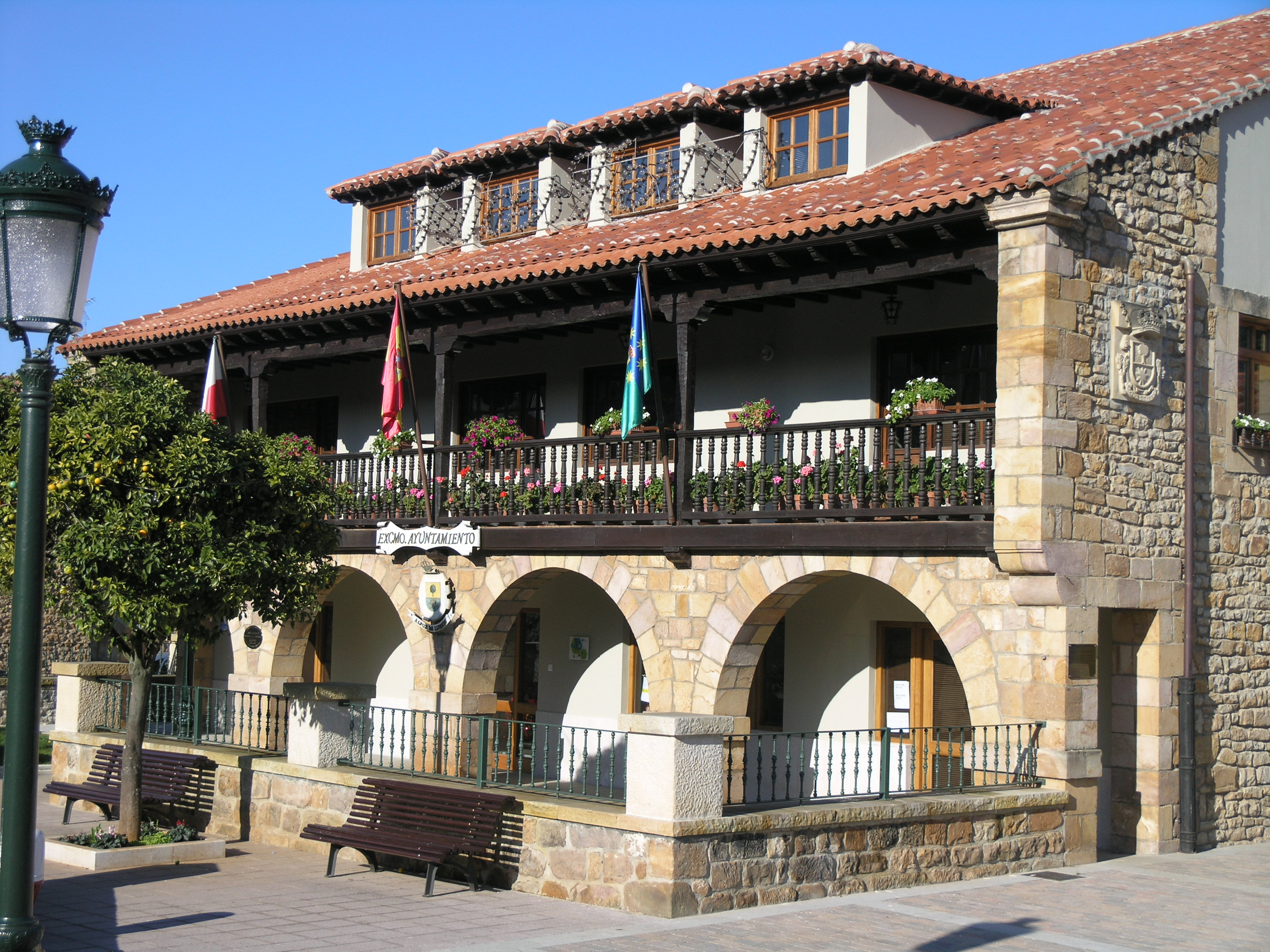
- Alfoz de Lloredo's City Hall

- Flag Coat of arms

- Location within Cantabria Alfoz de Lloredo (Spain)
- Coordinates: 43°22′45″N 4°10′32″W
- Country: Spain
- Autonomous community: Cantabria
- Province: Cantabria
- Comarca: Western coast of Cantabria
- Judicial district: Torrelavega
- Capital: Novales

Government
  - Alcalde: Enrique Bretones Palencia (2007) (PP)

Area
  - Total: 46.34 km^{2} (17.89 sq mi)
- Elevation: 55 m (180 ft)

Population (2025-01-01)
  - Total: 2,500
  - Density: 54/km^{2} (140/sq mi)
- Time zone: UTC+1 (CET)
  - Summer (DST): UTC+2 (CEST)
- Postal code: 39526
- Website: Official website

Alfoz de Lloredo is a municipality located in the autonomous community of Cantabria, Spain. According to the 2007 census, the city has a population of 2.538 inhabitants. Its capital is Novales.

== Towns ==
- La Busta
- Cóbreces
- Cigüenza
- Novales (capital)
- Oreña
- Rudagüera
- Toñanes
