= Colindres (surname) =

Colindres is a Spanish habitational surname. It originates from the town of Colindres in modern day Cantabria, Spain

Notable people with the surname include:

- Daniel Colindres (born 1985), Costa Rican professional footballer
- Denis Rolando Moncada Colindres, Nicaraguan Foreign Minister
- Verónica Colindres (born 1986), female Salvadoran race walker
- Vicente Mejía Colindres (1878–1966), President of Honduras between 16 September and 5 October 1919
