= Comarcas of Cantabria =

List of Cantabrian comarcas

Cantabria contains the following comarcas:

- Asón-Agüera
- Bay of Santander
- Besaya
- Campoo-Los Valles
- Western Coast
- Eastern Coast
- Liébana
- Valles Pasiegos
- Saja-Nansa
- Trasmiera

== See also ==
- Comarcas of Spain
