= San Vicente de la Barquera =

- Municipality
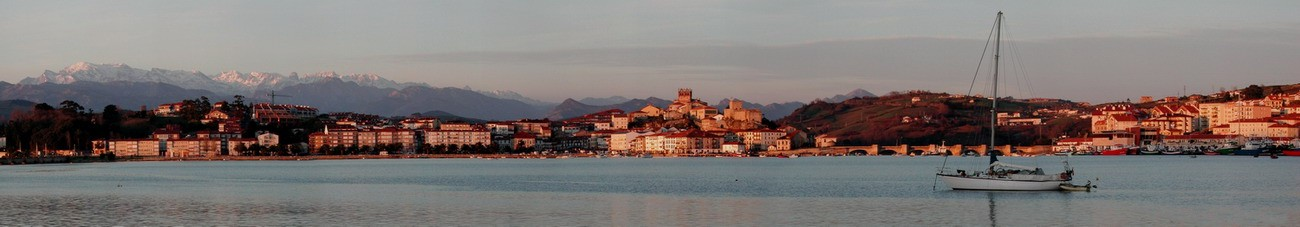

- Flag Coat of arms

- Location of San Vicente de la Barquera

- Location in Spain
- Coordinates: 43°23′6″N 4°23′55″W
- Country: Spain
- Autonomous community: Cantabria
- Province: Cantabria
- Comarca: Western coast
- Judicial district: San Vicente de la Barquera
- Capital: San Vicente de la Barquera

Government
  - Alcalde: Dionisio Luguera Santoveña (PSOE)

Area
  - Total: 41.5 km^{2} (16.0 sq mi)
- Elevation: 15 m (49 ft)

Population (2025-01-01)
  - Total: 3,995
  - Density: 96.3/km^{2} (249/sq mi)
- Demonym(s): Barquereño/a, evenciano/a, pejín/ina
- Time zone: UTC+1 (CET)
  - Summer (DST): UTC+2 (CEST)
- Official language(s): Spanish
- Website: Official website

San Vicente de la Barquera is a municipality of Cantabria in northern Spain. It had a population of 4,412 in 2002. Tourism is its main activity due to the area's natural environment and heritage. Approximately 80% of the municipal area belongs to the Oyambre Natural Park and enjoys a special protection regulated by the autonomous community of Cantabria as a result of its landscape and ecological value.

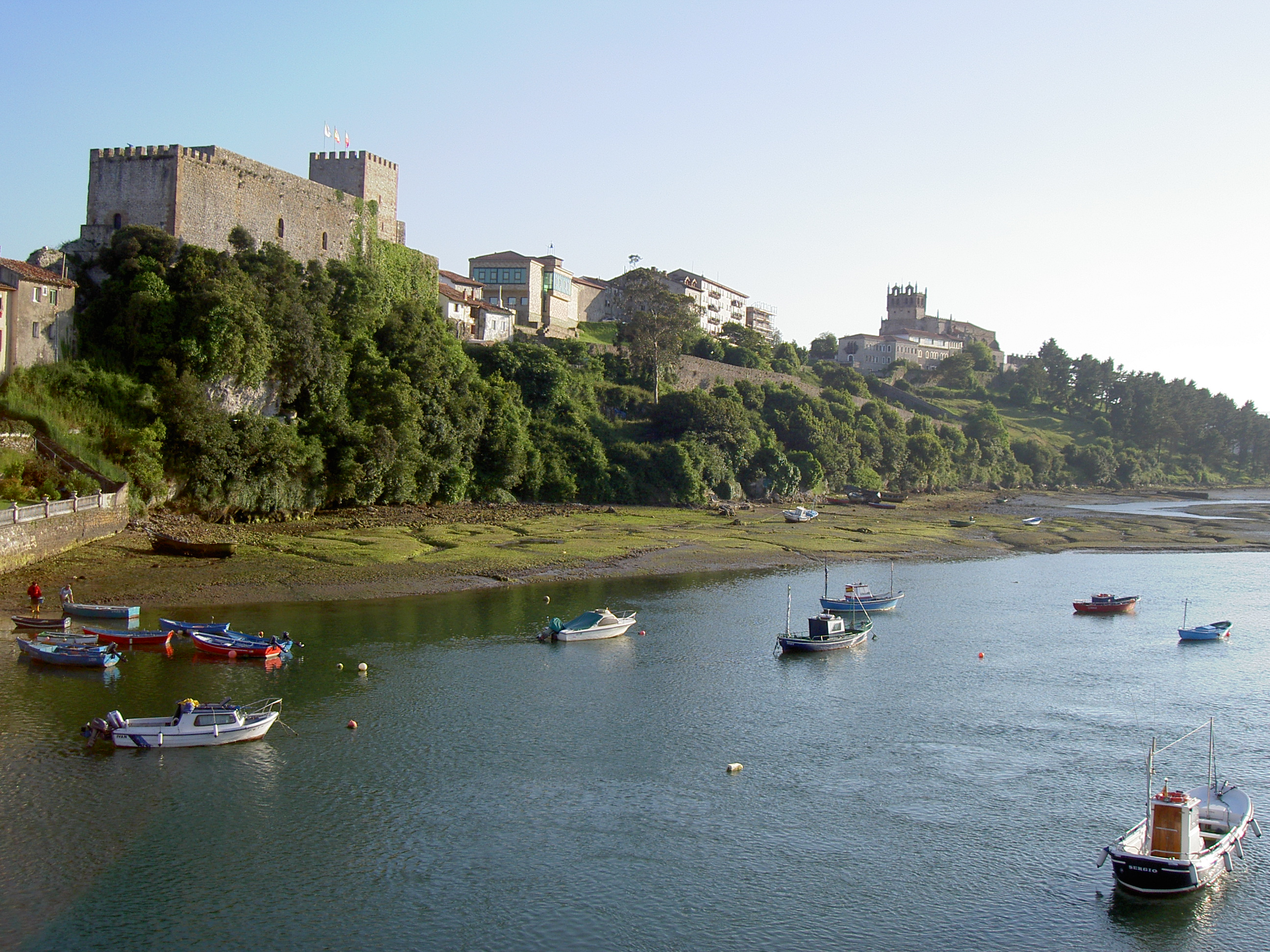
Castle of the King, built in the Early Middle Ages

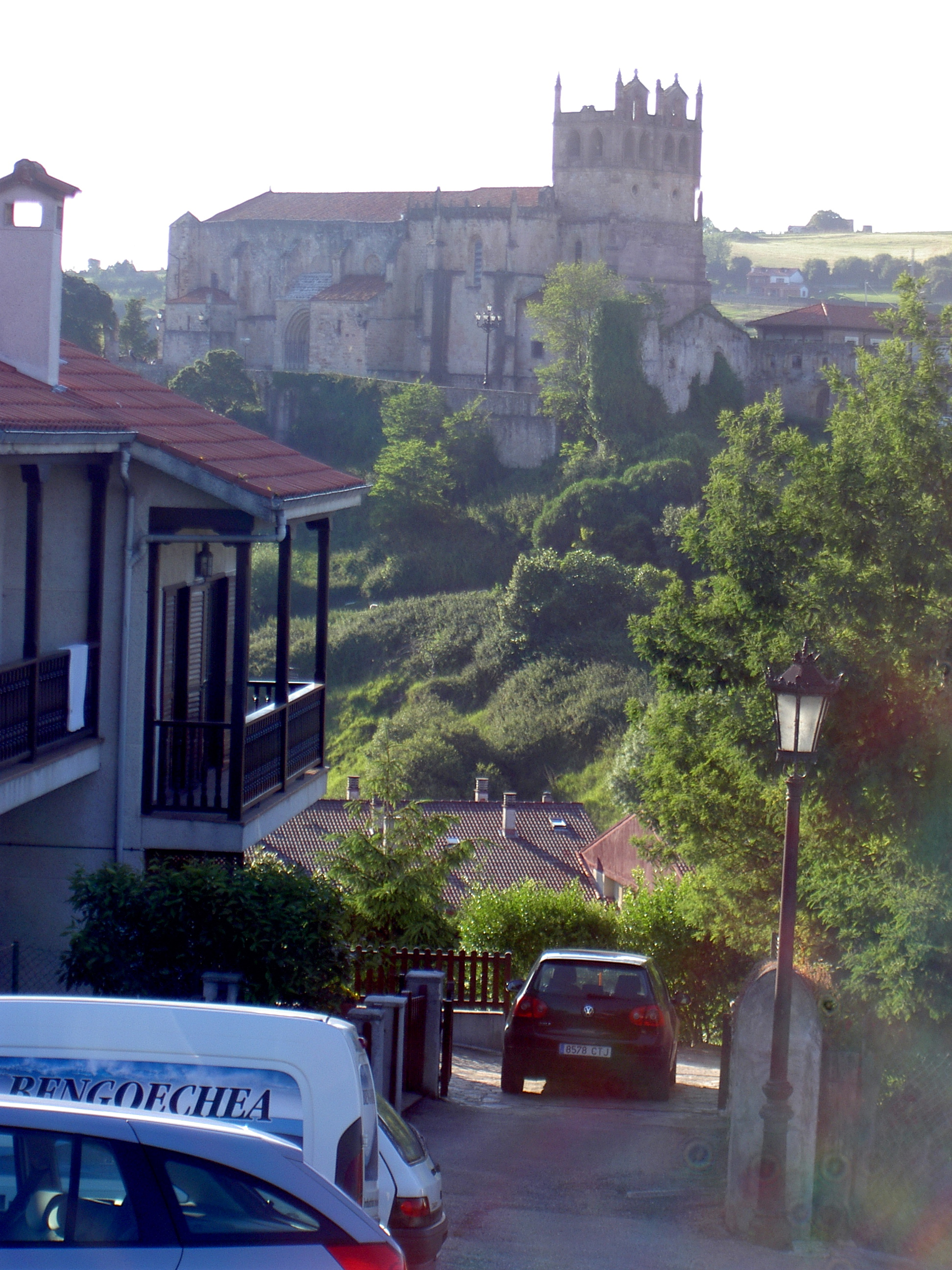
Church of Santa María de los Ángeles

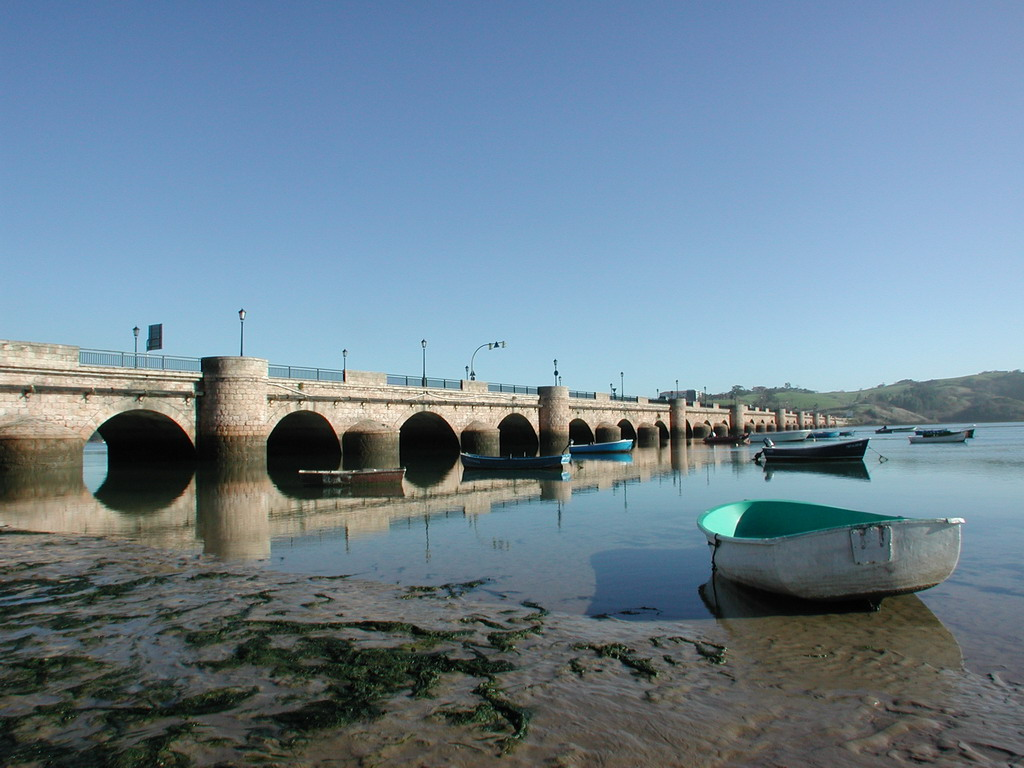
The Maza bridge at San Vicente de la Barquera

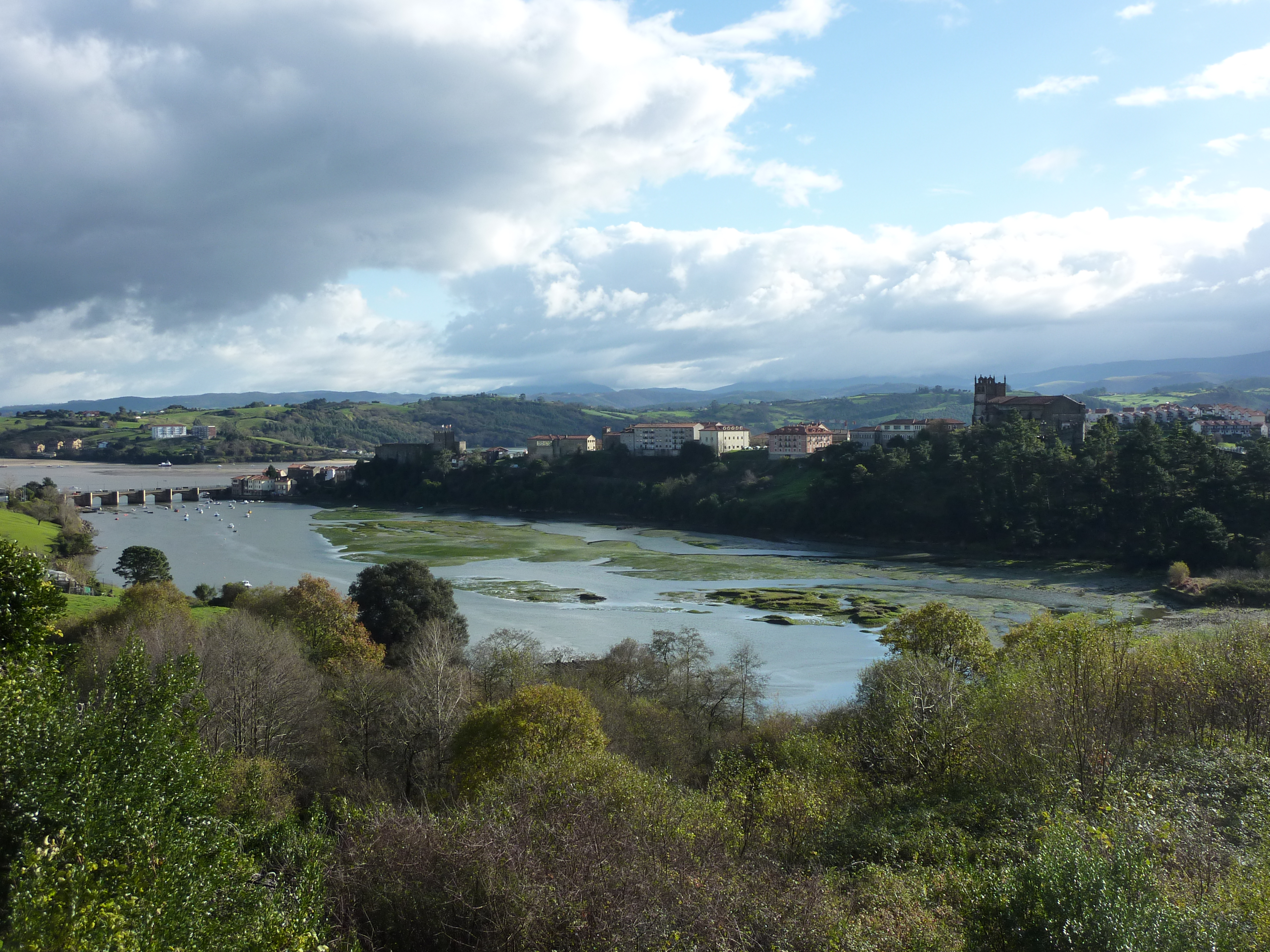
Rio Escudo and San Vicente de la Barquera
