= Ruiloba =

Coordinates: 43°22′54″N 4°15′03″W

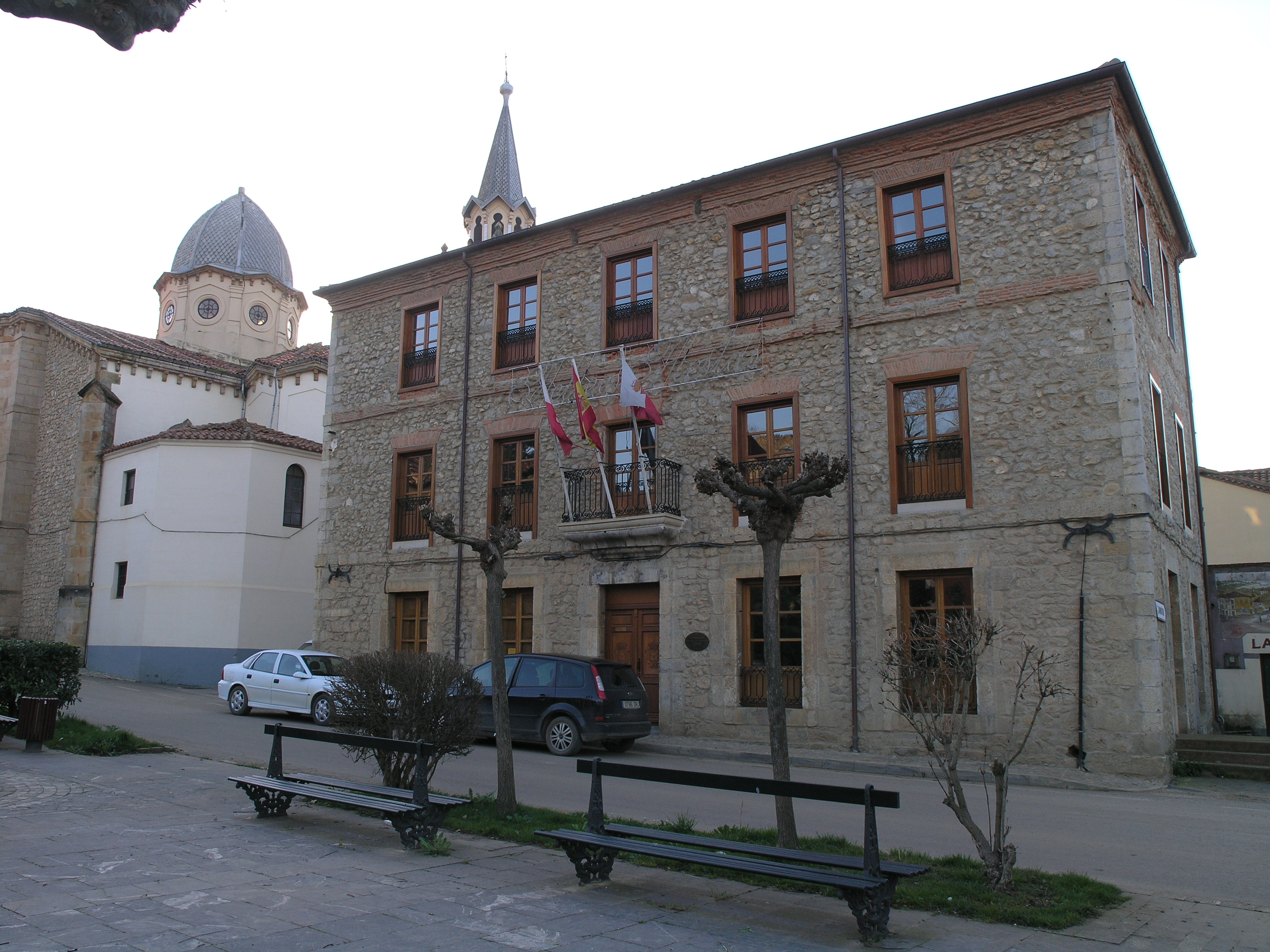
- Town hall

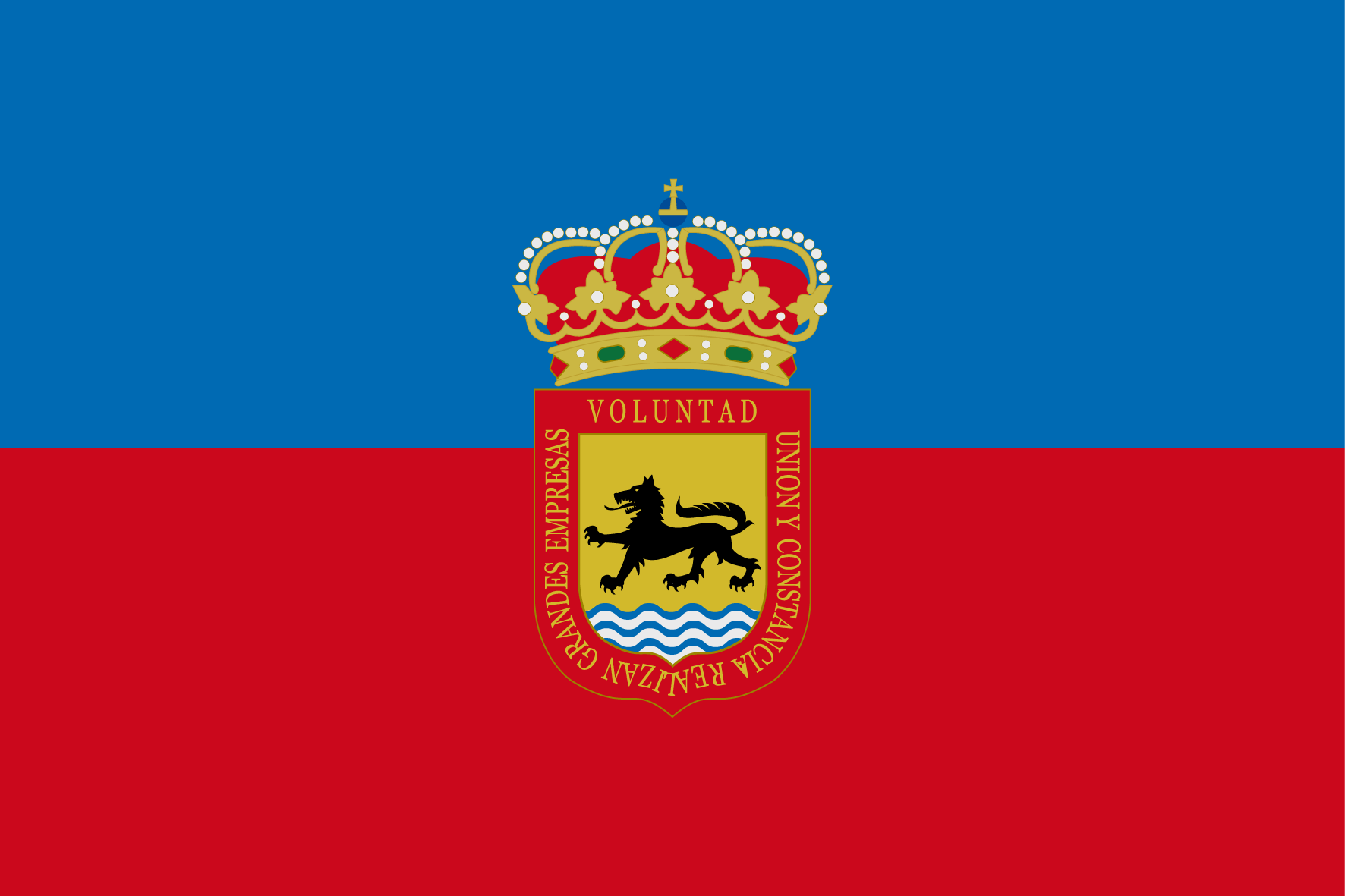
- Flag Coat of arms

- Location in Spain.
- Country: Spain
- Autonomous community: Cantabria

Area
  - Total: 15.13 km^{2} (5.84 sq mi)
- Elevation: 740 m (2,430 ft)

Population (2025-01-01)
  - Total: 769
  - Density: 50.8/km^{2} (132/sq mi)
- Time zone: UTC+1 (CET)
  - Summer (DST): UTC+2 (CEST)
- Website: www.ayuntamientoderuiloba.es

Ruiloba is a municipality in Cantabria Province, Spain.
