= Laredo, Spain =

Laredo
- Municipality and town
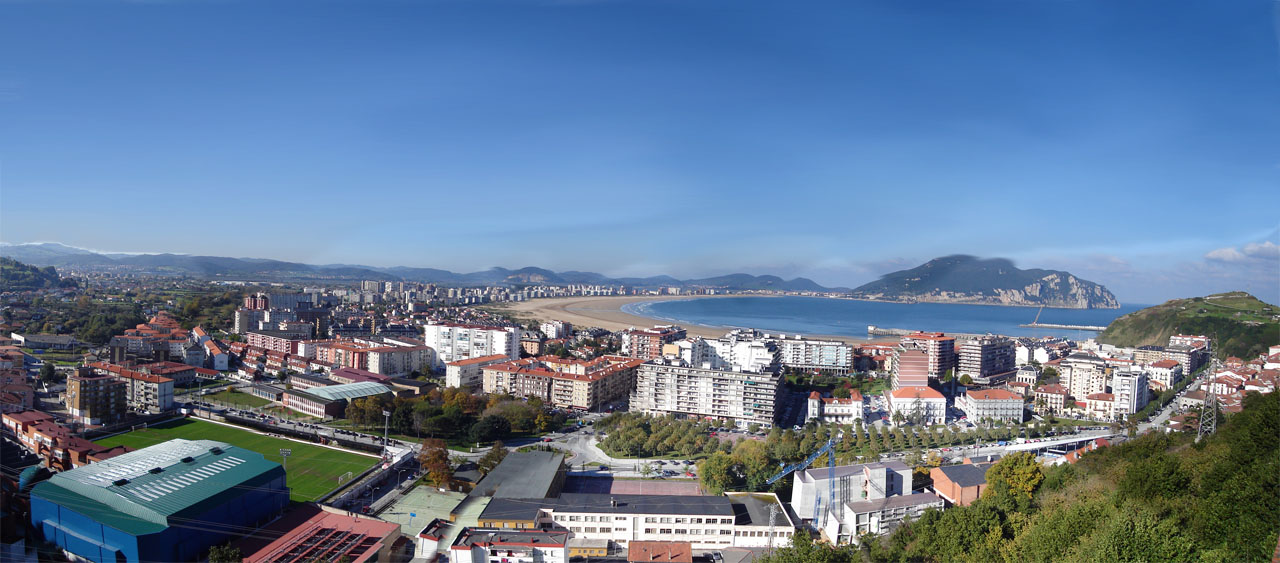
- Panoramic view of Laredo center

- Flag Coat of arms
- Interactive map of Laredo
- Location within Cantabria Location within Spain
- Coordinates: 43°24′52″N 3°24′36″W
- Country: Spain
- Autonomous community: Cantabria
- Province: Cantabria
- Comarca: Eastern coast of Cantabria
- Judicial district: Laredo
- Settled: 757

Government
  - Alcalde: Rosario Losa Martínez (2019) (PSOE)

Area
  - Total: 15.71 km^{2} (6.07 sq mi)
- Elevation: 5 m (16 ft)

Population (2025-01-01)
  - Total: 10,698
  - Density: 681.0/km^{2} (1,764/sq mi)
- Demonym(s): Laredano/a, pejino/a
- Time zone: UTC+1 (CET)
  - Summer (DST): UTC+2 (CEST)
- Postal code: 39770
- Dialing code: 942
- Website: Official website

Laredo (Spanish pronunciation: [laˈɾeðo]) is a town in the autonomous community of Cantabria, Spain. According to the 2008 census (INE), the municipality has a population of 12,648 inhabitants. In addition to Laredo, the municipality includes the villages of La Arenosa, El Callejo, Las Cárcobas, Las Casillas, La Pesquera, Tarrueza and Villante. Except from the last two, the other villages had been physically integrated into Laredo.

Located between the cities of Santander and Bilbao, Laredo is known in the region and nationally for "La Salvé", its 5 km long beach (7 km at high tide) and for the historic part of town dating back to Roman times. Its festivities in August are also well known due to the main event that occurs every year on the last Friday of August, known as la batalla de flores (the battle of the flowers), during which large floats entirely covered with flowers and petals are paraded along the central streets.

In Laredo (and many other cities in Spain) it is tradition for a group of men to parade a giant sardine through town at the end of carnival. At the end of this ritual, called Entierro de la Sardina ("burial of the sardine"), the sardine is burned on the beach after a fireworks display.

This town gave its name to the twin cities of Laredo and Nuevo Laredo on the U.S.-Mexico border.

== Economy ==
Economically, Laredo is based on fishing and the service sector and tourism. Laredo is considered one of the main resorts on the Cantabrian coast. The local industry is based on the processing of fishery products, especially anchovies, and family businesses.

In Laredo, whose average income level is amongst the fifteen highest in Cantabria, the service sector employs over half the population (51.2%). Laredo Regional Hospital in Laredo serves the surrounding region.

== History ==
Laredo is also mentioned in the Cartulary of the Monastery of Santa María del Puerto de Santoña, dated 1068, which records the transfer to the monastery of certain estates belonging to the Church of San Martín of Laredo and its cemetery.

In 1200 it was granted the privilege of becoming a royal town with its own jurisdiction. On 25 January of that year King Alfonso VIII signed in Belorado (Burgos) the charter that conferred its fuero. In 1492, Laredo was one of the ports from which Jews expelled under the Alhambra Decree departed Spain.

== Transport ==
Laredo is connected to Spanish transportation hubs Bilbao and Santander via Automoviles Luarca, S.A.. Bilbao is an hour to the east of Laredo, while Santander lies 40 minutes west. Madrid is a 5-hour bus journey away.

== People from Laredo ==
- Bernardino de Escalante (1537–c. 1605), writer
- José Emilio Amavisca (born 1971), retired footballer
- Ignacio Rodríguez Ortiz (born 1982), footballer

== Twin towns – Sister cities ==
- Cenon, France (since 1988)
- (Sahrawi Arab Democratic Republic) Dakhla, Sahrawi Republic (since 16 December 2011)
- Laredo, United States
- Nuevo Laredo, Mexico

== Gallery ==
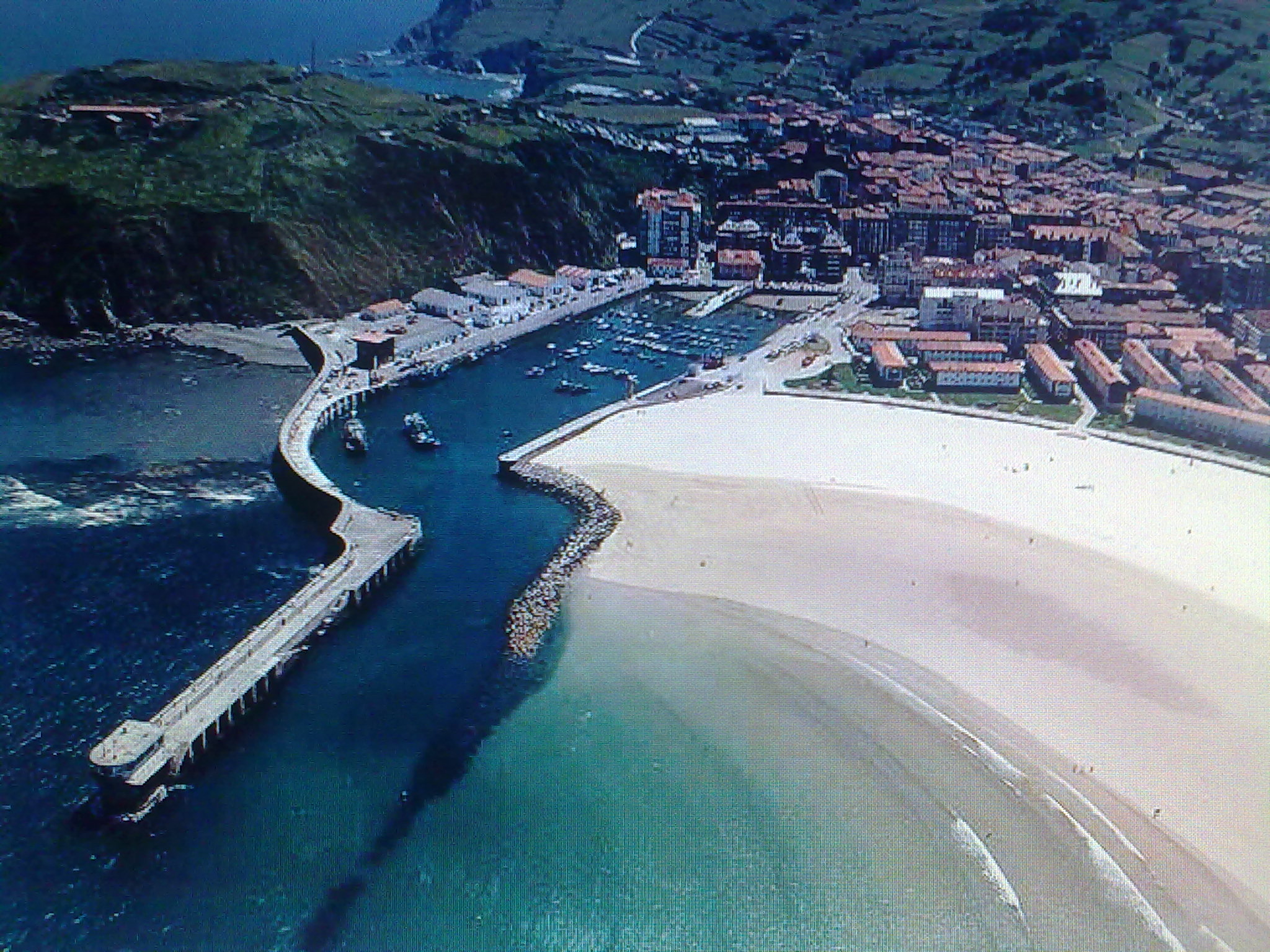
"El Canto", old port of Laredo (1883-2006)

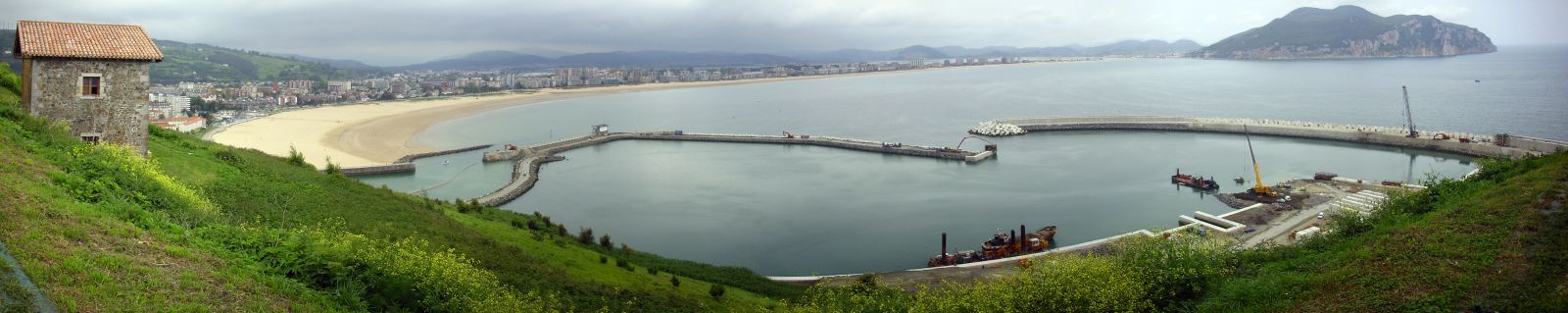
Works on the new port of Laredo, May 2009

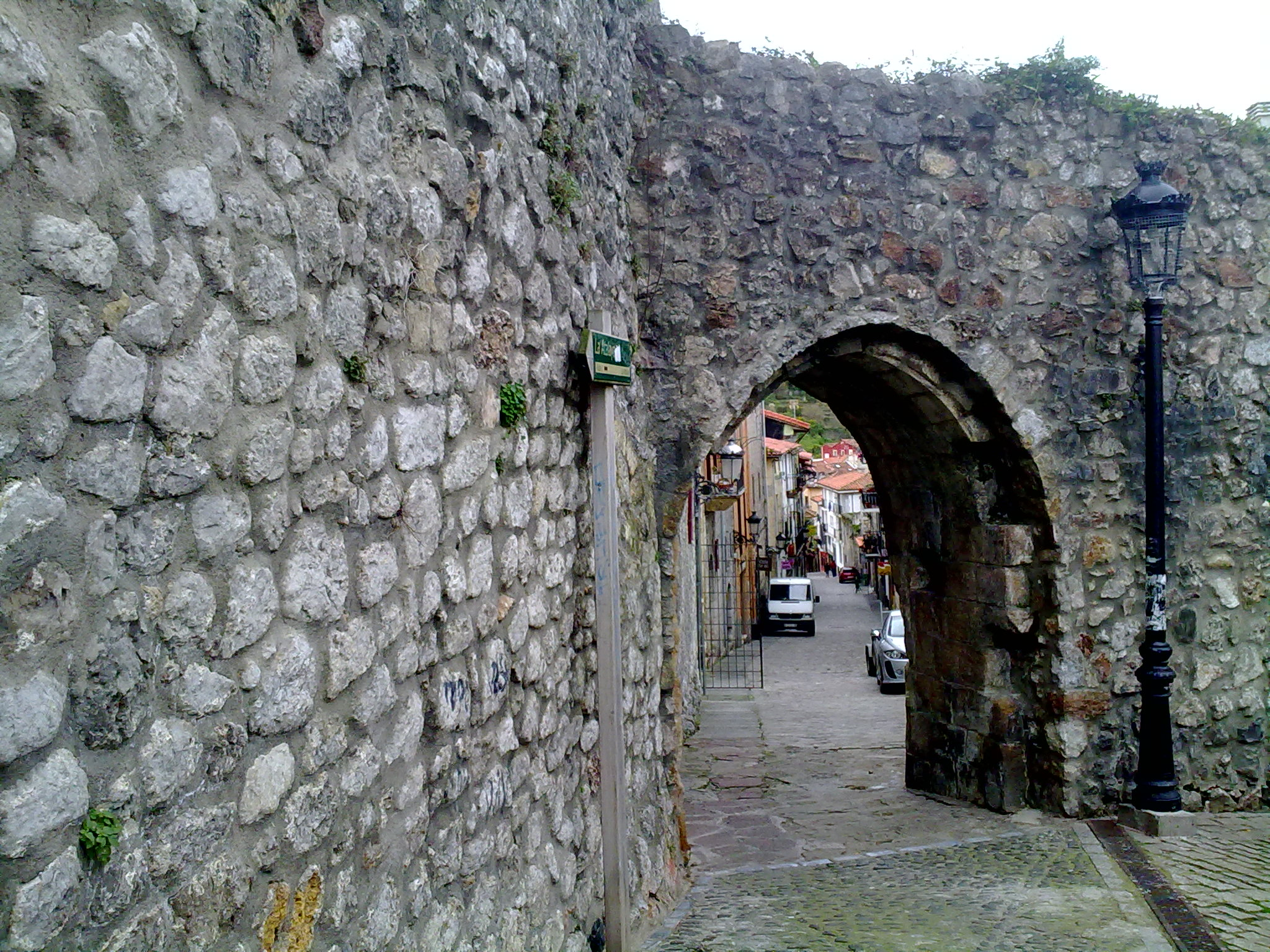
Medieval walls (13th century) at the "Puebla Vieja" of Laredo

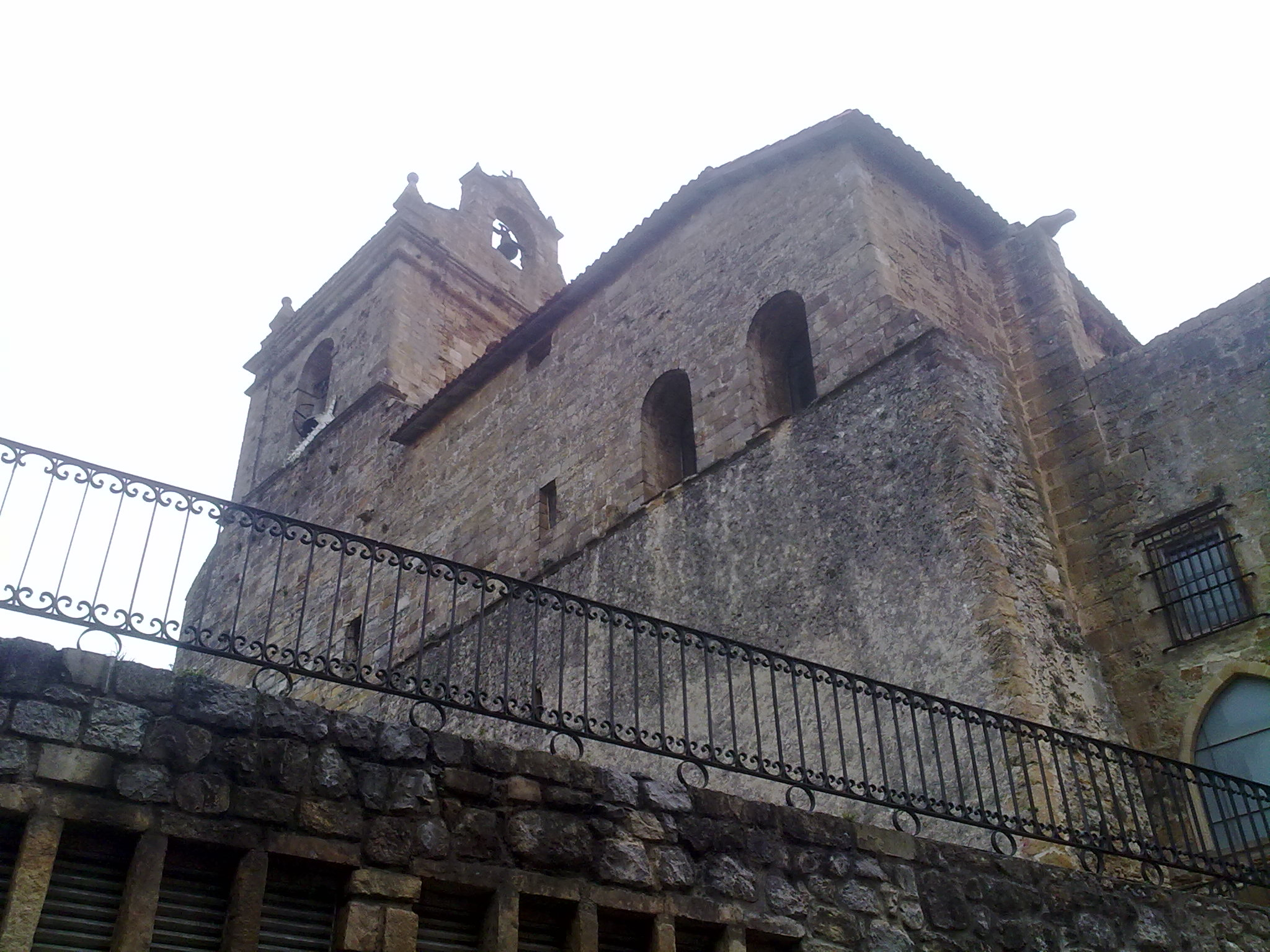
"Santa María de la Asunción" church (13th century-17th century) at the "Puebla Vieja" of Laredo

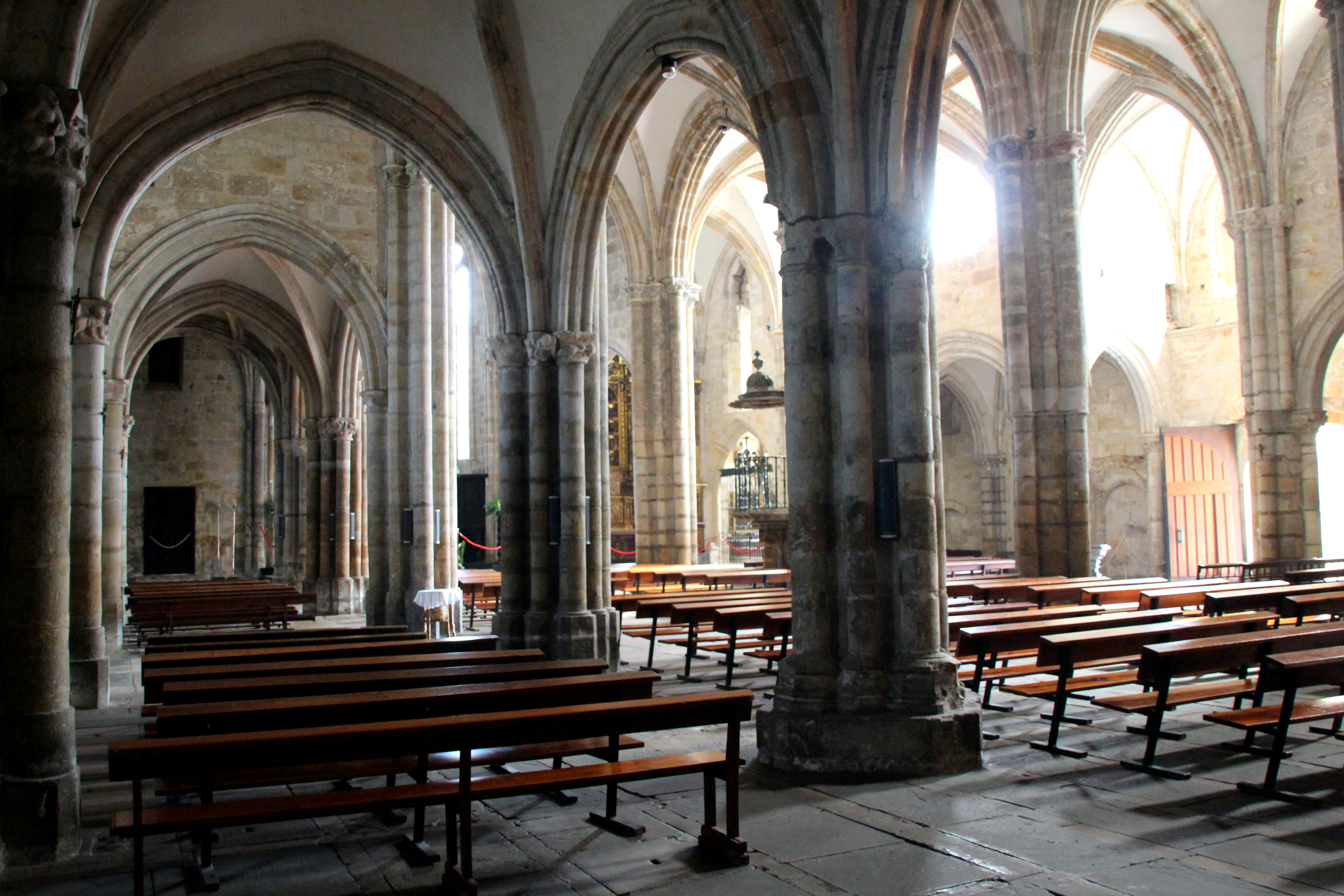
"Santa María de la Asunción" interior

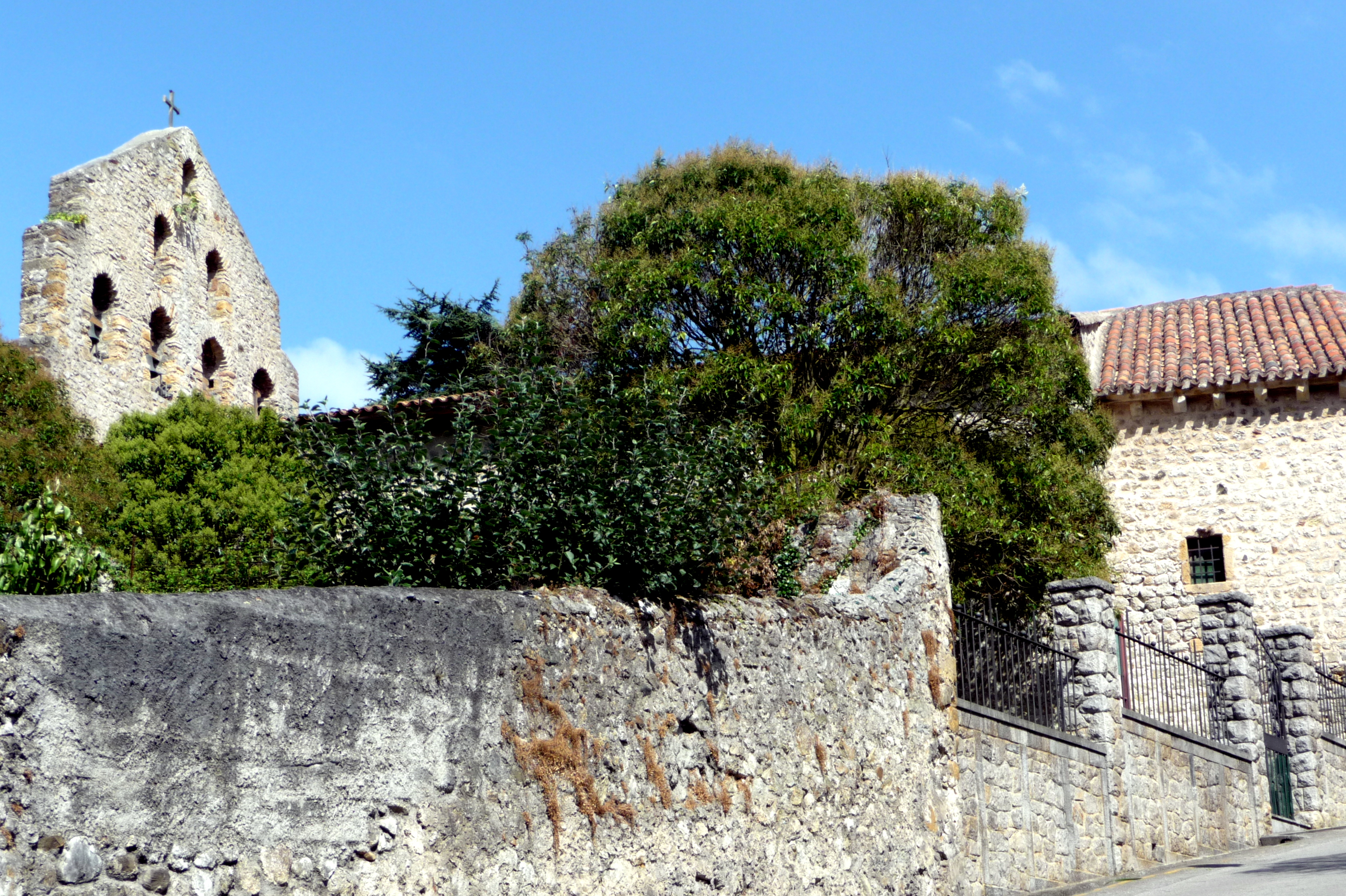
"San Martín y Santa Catalina" church (13th century)

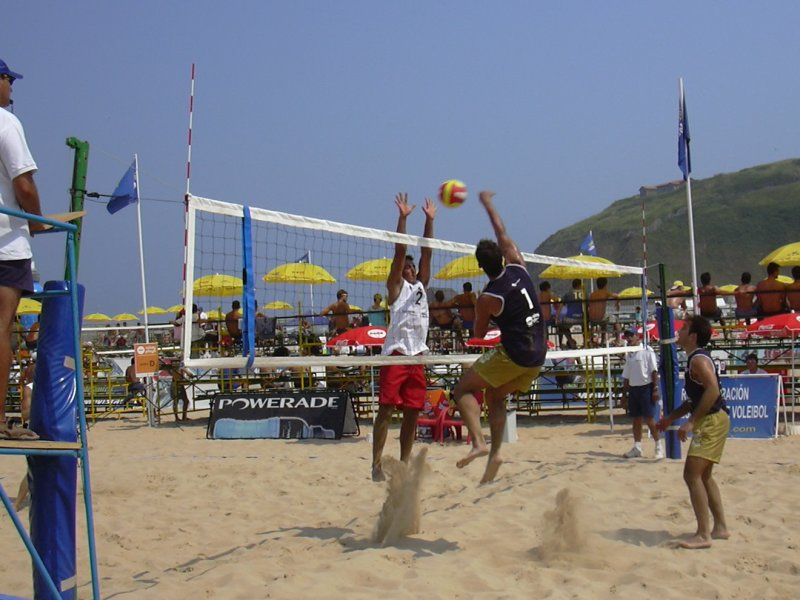
Beach Volleyball Spanish Championship 2004 in "La Salvé" beach, Laredo

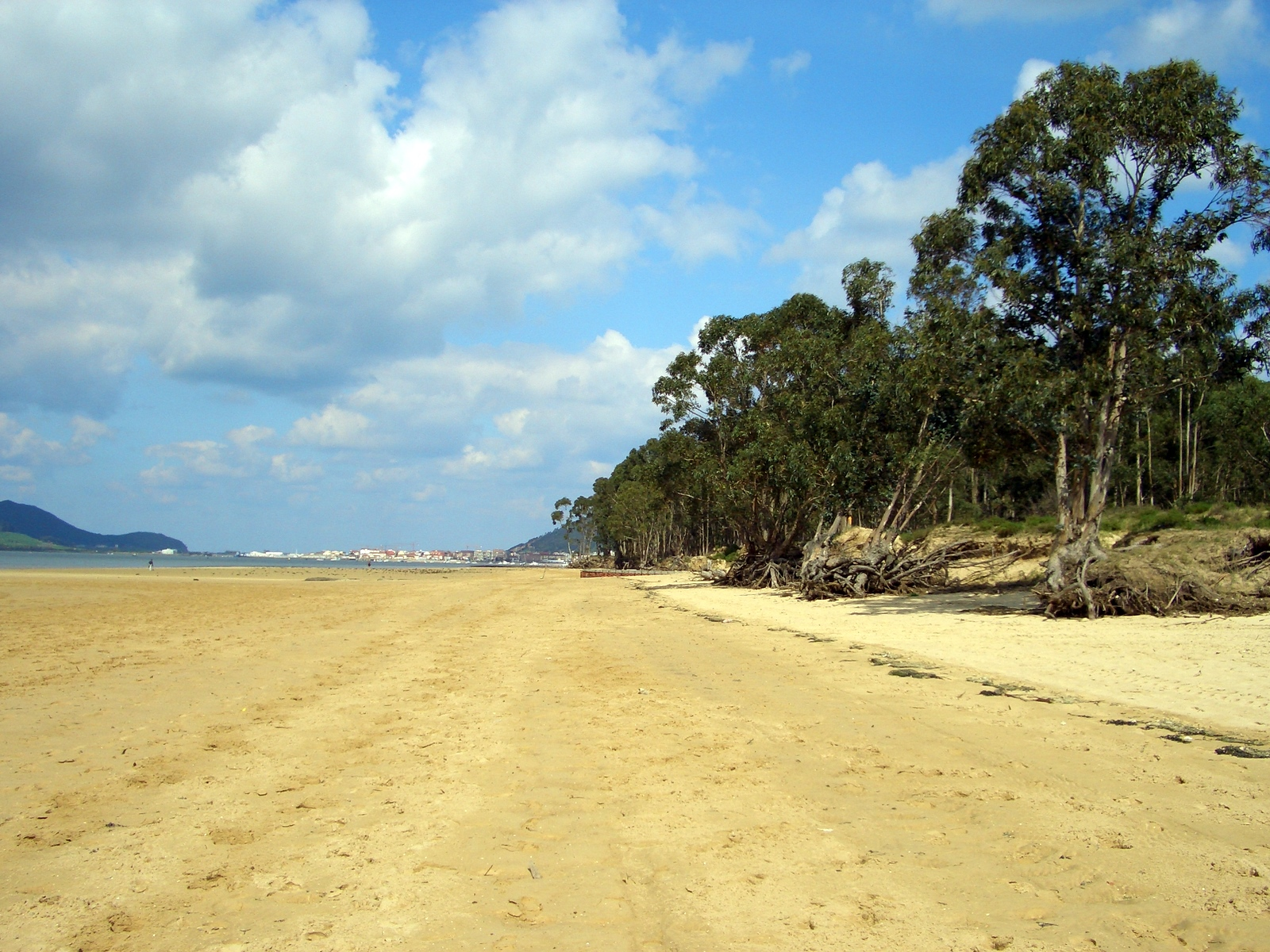
"El Regatón" beach

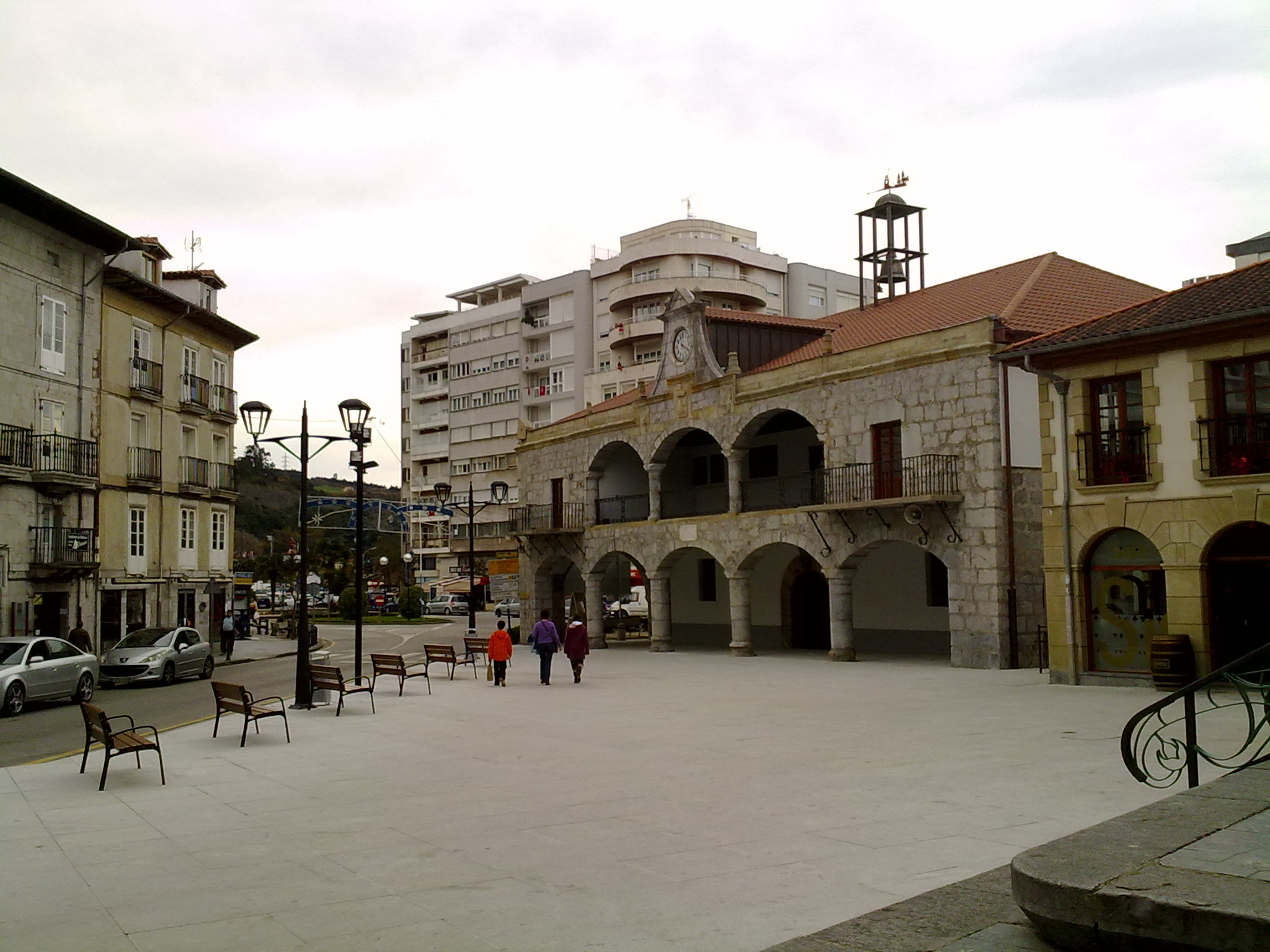
Old town hall (1561-2008)

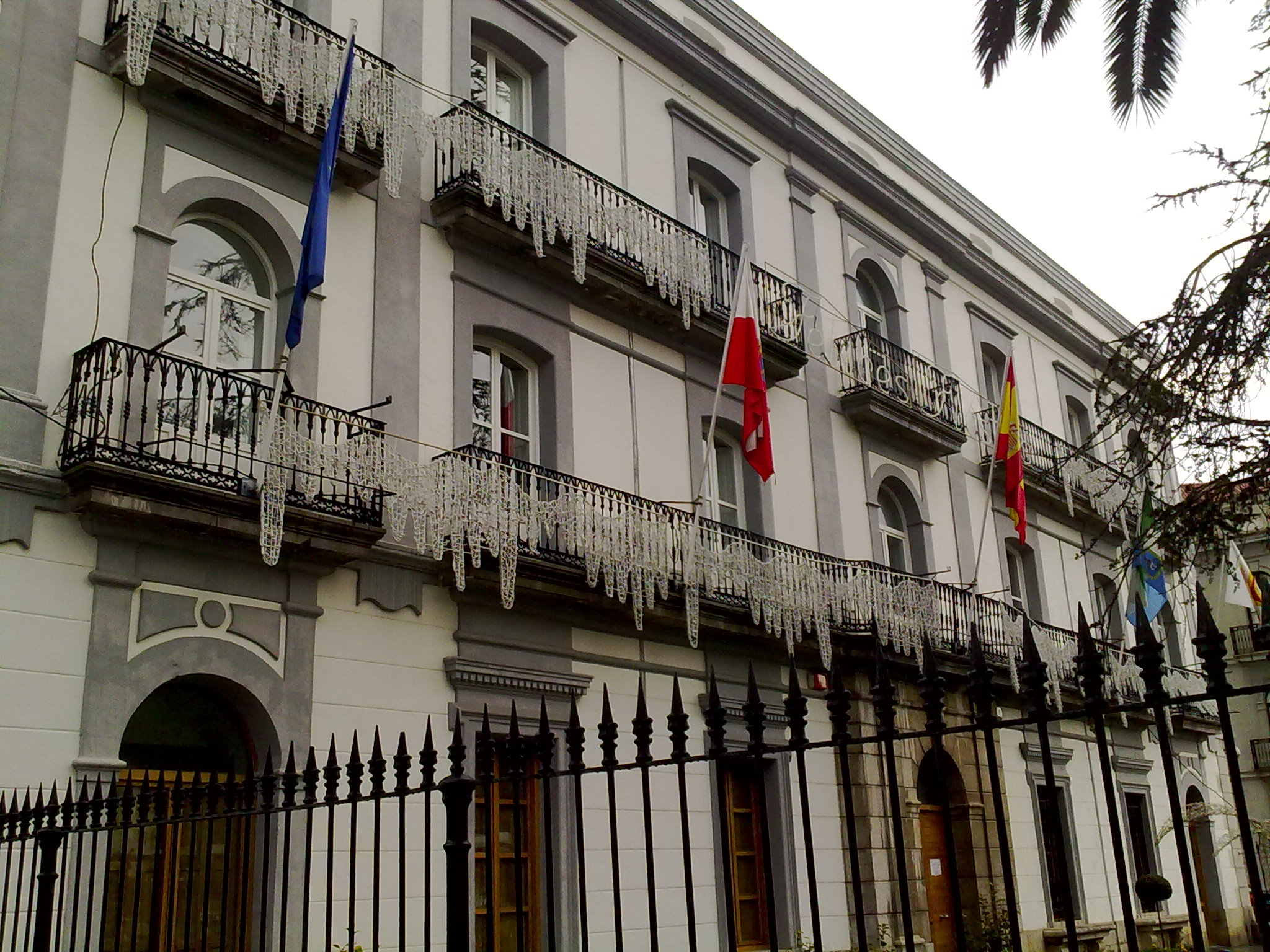
New town hall

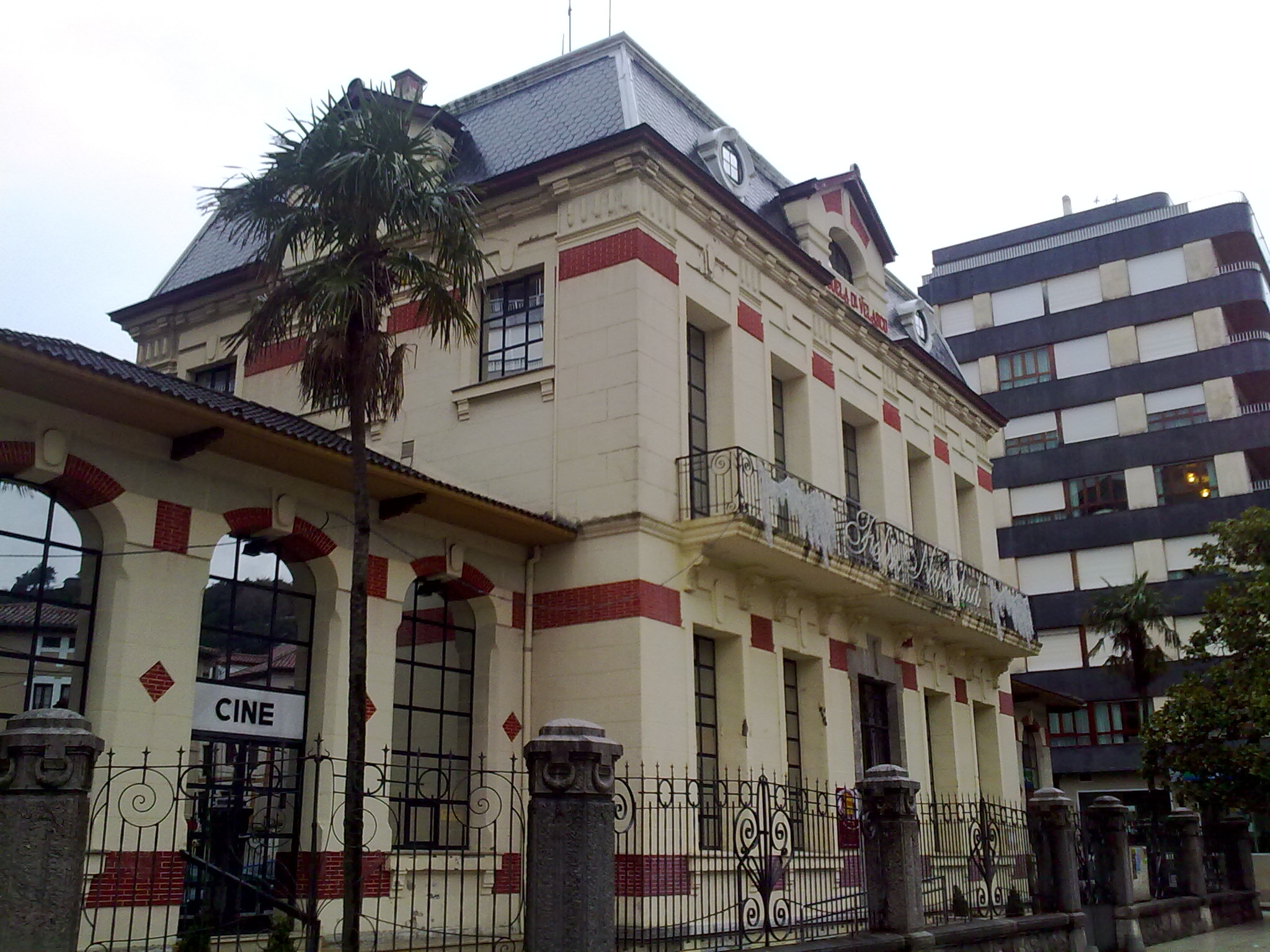
Former Dr. Velasco school, nowadays used as cultural center, and in summer as cinema and main location of the University of Cantabria summer courses

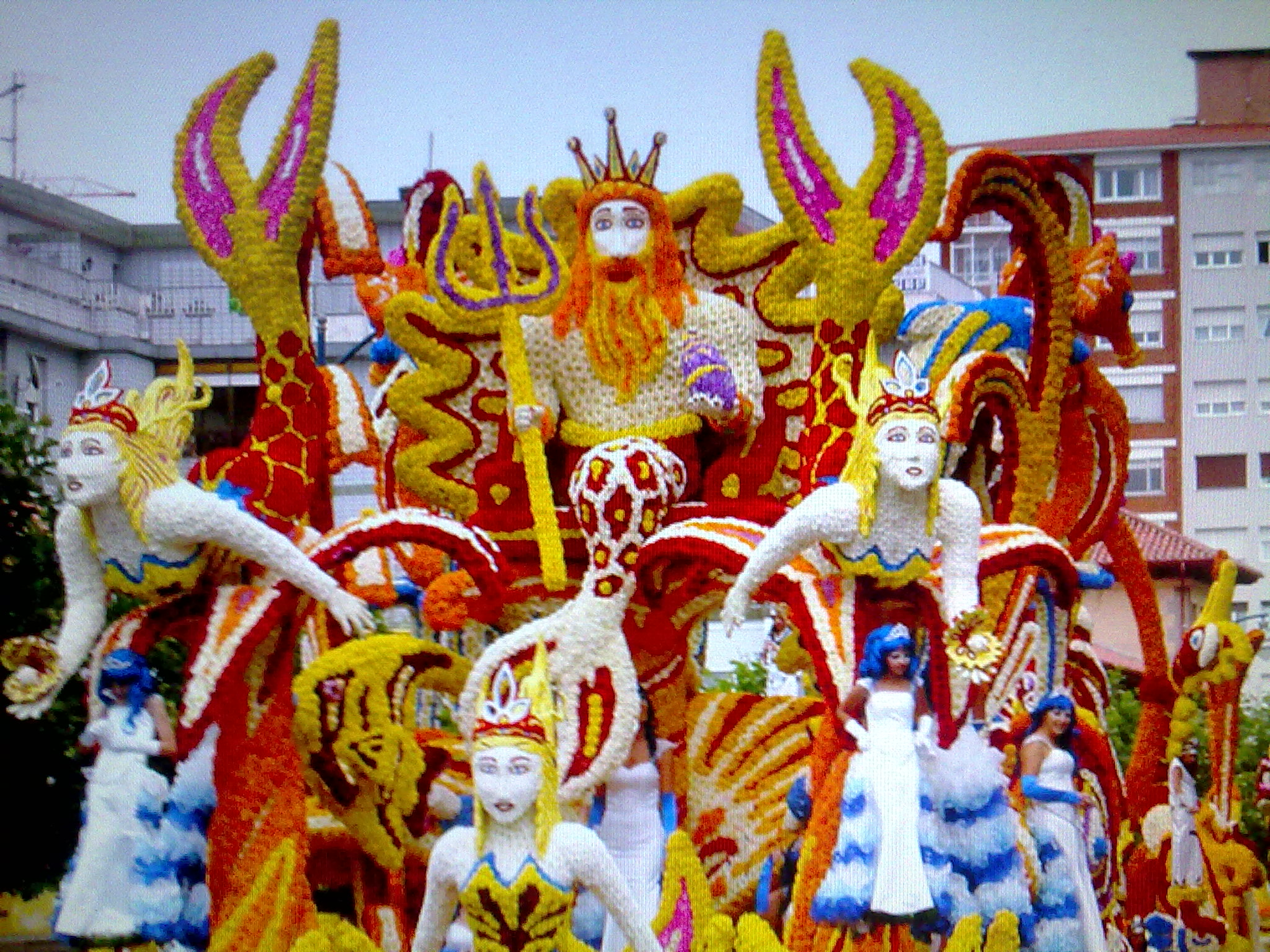
The Battle of Flowers festival

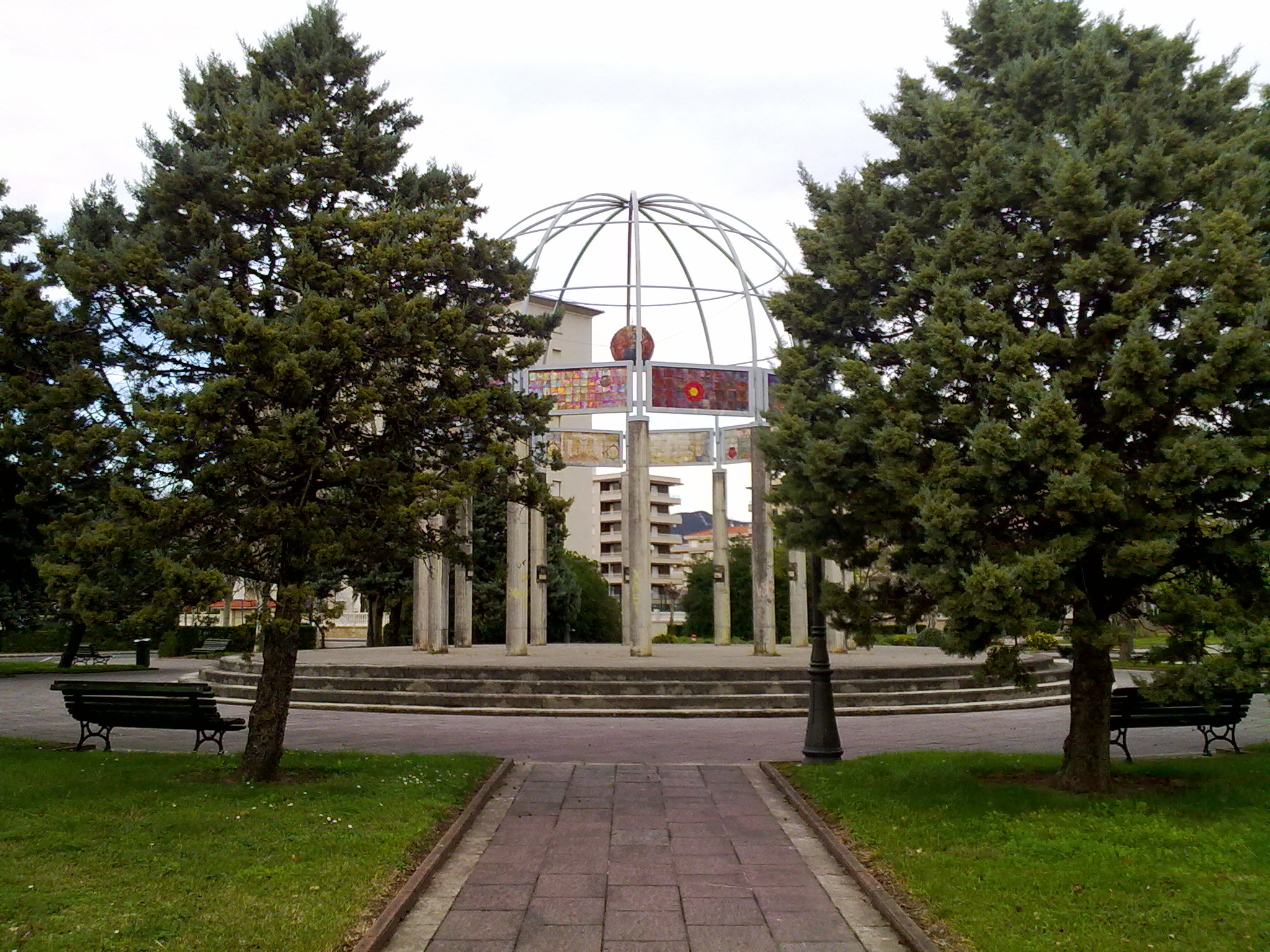
3 Laredos Park

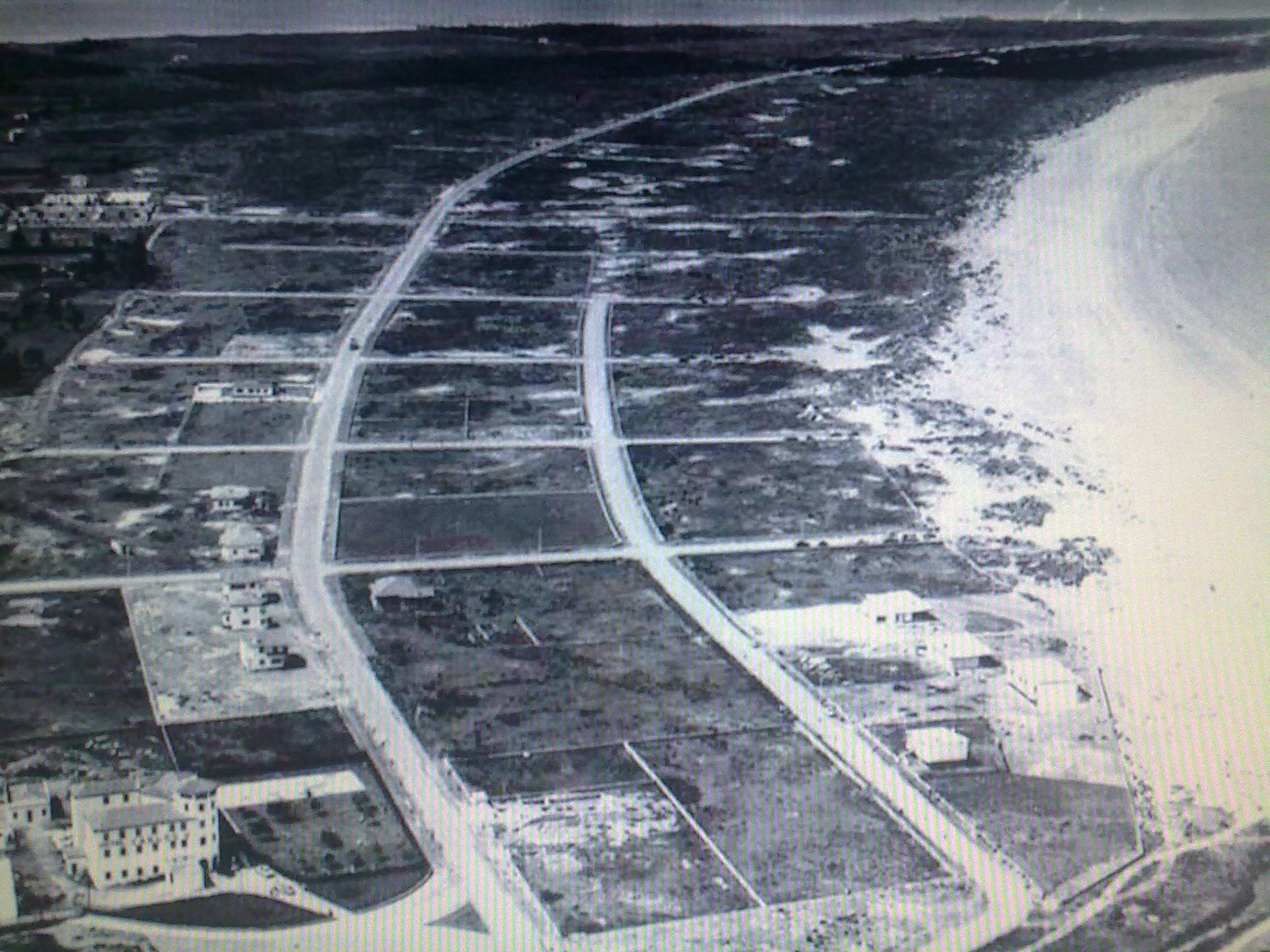
Laredo's "El Ensanche" and "La Salvé" beach in the 1950s
